= Balinsasayao =

Balinsasayao or Balinsasayaw may refer to:

- Swiftlets, family of birds
- Lake Balinsasayao in Negros Oriental, Philippines
- Balinsasayao Twin Lakes Natural Park in Negros Oriental, Philippines
- Kuapnit Balinsasayao National Park in Leyte, Philippines
