= Sibulan =

Municipality in Negros Oriental, Philippines

- Municipality
- Municipality of Sibulan
- Sibulan Municipal Hall Balinsasayao Twin Lakes Natural Park San Antonio de Padua Church

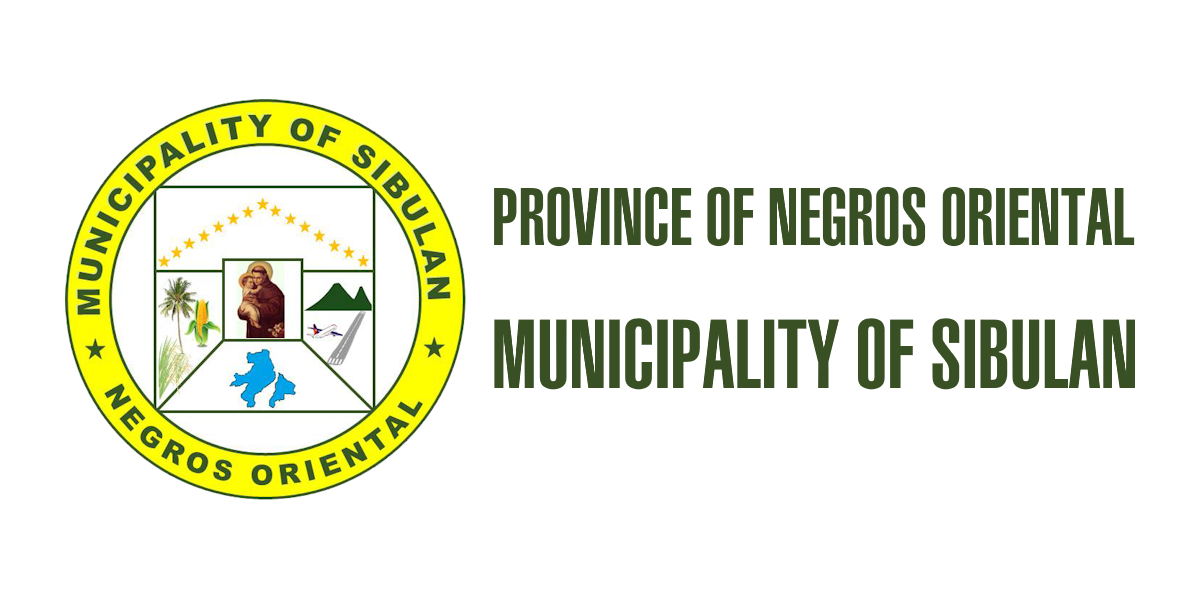
- Flag Seal

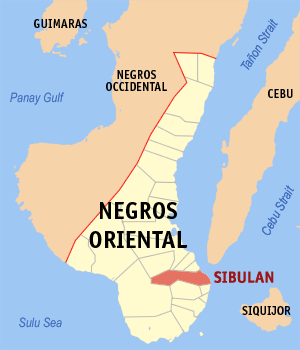
- Map of Negros Oriental with Sibulan highlighted
- Interactive map of Sibulan
- Location within the Philippines
- Coordinates: 9°21′N 123°17′E
- Country: Philippines
- Region: Negros Island Region
- Province: Negros Oriental
- District: 2nd district
- Barangays: 15 (see Barangays)

Government
  - Type: Sangguniang Bayan
  - Mayor: Jose A. Abiera
  - Vice Mayor: Antonio D. Renacia (Ind)
  - Representative: Maisa Sagarbarria (Lakas)
  - Municipal Council: Members: Jose Sandino B. Abiera; Rowtir John D. Banquerigo; Mark Christoffel D. Banquerigo; Dean David P. Ang; Marcela G. Bartoces; Oliver A. Rucas; Dennis R. Omoso; Felix P. Diputado; Emma Fe C. Bulagao ^{‡}; Kyle Aster A. Diongco ^{◌}; ‡ ex officio ABC president; ◌ ex officio SK chairman
  - Electorate: 37,535 voters (2025)

Area
  - Total: 163.00 km^{2} (62.93 sq mi)
- Elevation: 32 m (105 ft)
- Highest elevation: 285 m (935 ft)
- Lowest elevation: 0 m (0 ft)

Population (2024 census)
  - Total: 69,092
  - Density: 423.88/km^{2} (1,097.8/sq mi)
  - Households: 15,785

Economy
  - Income class: 1st municipal income class
  - Poverty incidence: 13.85% (2023)
  - Revenue: ₱ 325.5 million (2024)
  - Assets: ₱ 828.3 million (2024)
  - Expenditure: ₱ 273.1 million (2024)
  - Liabilities: ₱ 83.27 million (2024)

Service provider
  - Electricity: Negros Oriental 2 Electric Cooperative (NORECO 2)
- Time zone: UTC+8 (PST)
- ZIP code: 6201
- PSGC: 074620000
- IDD : area code: +63 (0)35
- Native languages: Cebuano; Tagalog
- Website: www.sibulan.gov.ph

Sibulan, officially the Municipality of Sibulan (Cebuano: Lungsod sa Sibulan; Tagalog: Bayan ng Sibulan), is a municipality in the province of Negros Oriental, Philippines. According to the 2024 census, it has a population of 69,092 people.

== Geography ==
Sibulan is 5 kilometres (3.1 mi) from Dumaguete and 210 kilometres (130 mi) from Bacolod. It is the location of Dumaguete Airport, the main airport for Negros Oriental.

Sibulan is also the location of the Balinsasayao Twin Lakes Natural Park, composed of Lake Balinsasayao and Lake Danao. The site, managed by the provincial government, is located 1,047 metres (3,435 ft) above sea level on Mount Talinis.

=== Barangays ===
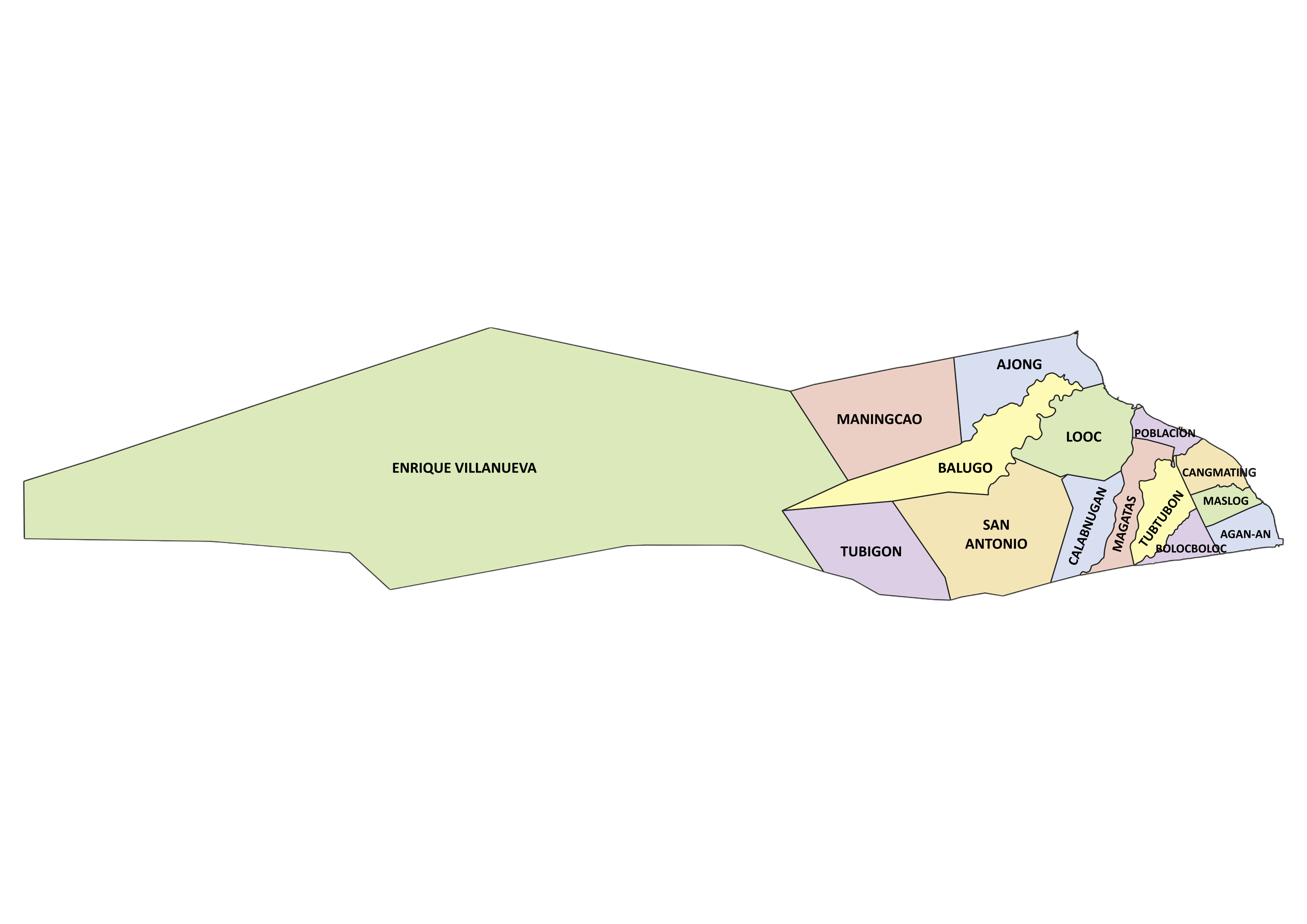
Political map of Sibulan

Sibulan is politically subdivided into 15 barangays. Each barangay consists of puroks and some have sitios.

PSGC	Barangay	Population			±% p.a.	
		2024		2010		
074620001	Agan-an	3.6%	2,472	3,010	▾	−1.35%
074620002	Ajong	5.1%	3,545	3,113	▴	0.90%
074620003	Balugo	3.6%	2,473	2,115	▴	1.09%
074620004	Bolocboloc	13.7%	9,495	7,539	▴	1.61%
074620005	Calabnugan	2.7%	1,891	1,339	▴	2.42%
074620006	Cangmating	10.7%	7,360	3,463	▴	5.35%
074620007	Enrique Villanueva	1.2%	856	1,285	▾	−2.77%
074620008	Looc	7.4%	5,138	4,066	▴	1.63%
074620009	Magatas	9.5%	6,597	4,820	▴	2.19%
074620010	Maningcao	3.9%	2,676	1,950	▴	2.21%
074620011	Maslog	7.5%	5,194	5,300	▾	−0.14%
074620012	Poblacion	8.0%	5,517	5,145	▴	0.48%
074620013	San Antonio	4.4%	3,068	2,641	▴	1.04%
074620014	Tubigon	1.5%	1,033	999	▴	0.23%
074620015	Tubtubon	10.2%	7,028	4,734	▴	2.77%
	Total		69,092	51,519	▴	2.05%

=== Climate ===
Climate data for Sibulan, Negros Oriental
Month	Jan	Feb	Mar	Apr	May	Jun	Jul	Aug	Sep	Oct	Nov	Dec	Year
Mean daily maximum °C (°F)	30 (86)	30 (86)	31 (88)	33 (91)	32 (90)	31 (88)	30 (86)	30 (86)	30 (86)	29 (84)	30 (86)	30 (86)	31 (87)
Mean daily minimum °C (°F)	22 (72)	22 (72)	22 (72)	23 (73)	24 (75)	25 (77)	24 (75)	24 (75)	24 (75)	24 (75)	23 (73)	23 (73)	23 (74)
Average precipitation mm (inches)	26 (1.0)	22 (0.9)	28 (1.1)	41 (1.6)	95 (3.7)	136 (5.4)	147 (5.8)	126 (5.0)	132 (5.2)	150 (5.9)	98 (3.9)	46 (1.8)	1,047 (41.3)
Average rainy days	7.5	6.7	8.9	10.4	21.6	25.6	26.3	25.0	24.1	26.2	19.2	12.1	213.6
Source: Meteoblue

== Demographics ==
Population census of Sibulan

Year	Pop.	±% p.a.
1903	8,413	—
1918	9,833	+1.05%
1939	9,884	+0.02%
1948	8,096	−2.19%
1960	12,026	+3.35%
1970	16,861	+3.43%

Year	Pop.	±% p.a.
1975	20,108	+3.60%
1980	23,123	+2.83%
1990	27,172	+1.63%
1995	31,206	+2.63%
2000	37,523	+4.03%
2007	47,162	+3.20%

Year	Pop.	±% p.a.
2010	51,519	+3.27%
2015	59,455	+2.77%
2020	64,343	+1.68%
2024	69,092	+1.72%

Source: Philippine Statistics Authority

== Economy ==
Poverty incidence of Sibulan (%)

Source: Philippine Statistics Authority

Dumaguete Airport, the major airport in the province, is actually in Agan-an. There is a growing number of guest houses and beach resorts from Cangmating southward to Dumaguete and the coral reefs of Ajong are attracting more dive boats.

The municipal seat is in Poblacion, approximately midway along the coast of the town. The main port facility is located in the same barangay, where there are trips every hour to Liloan, Santander on the southern tip of Cebu island. There is also a fishing and freight port in Looc.

Sibulan has two small Marine Protected Areas (MPAs), which are coral reef areas that prohibit fishing, swimming and diving. One is in Agan-an, just north of the airport, the other in Cangmating. These were established to improve the sustainability of the local fishery.

The inland barangays are primarily agricultural and residential with minimal business and public facilities. Most commercial development is along the national highway, which runs the length of the town from Dumaguete in the south to San Jose at the north. Most business and light industry is also located along the highway in Bolocboloc, Maslog, Agan-an and Poblacion including the newly opened 100-bed Negros Polymedic Hospital. This is largely urban sprawl from Dumaguete seeking the advantageous tax rates in Sibulan.

Sibulan also boasts a golf course resort, perched on the foothills in barangay San Antonio, just north of the town center.

== Education ==
Colleges:

- Metro Dumaguete College Campus 2 — Magatas
- Negros Maritime College Foundation Inc. — Magatas
- St. Joseph Seminary College — Agan-an

The public schools in the town of Sibulan are administered by two school districts under the Schools Division of Negros Oriental.

Elementary schools:

- Agan-an Elementary School — Agan-an
- Bagtic Elementary School — Sitio Tubod, Enrique Villanueva
- Balugo Elementary School — Balugo
- Bolocboloc Elementary School — Bolocboloc
- Calabnugan Elementary School — Calabnugan
- Cambajao Elementary School — Sitio Cambajao, Balugo
- Cangmating Elementary School — Cangmating
- Cantalawan Elementary School — Sitio Cantalawan, Maningcao
- Escaguit Elementary School — Sitio Escaguit, Enrique Villanueva
- Libertad Ong Calderon Memorial Elementary School — Ajong
- Lo-oc Elementary School — Looc
- Magatas Elementary School — Magatas
- Magsaysay Memorial Elementary School — Campaclan, Poblacion
- Maningcao Elementary School — Maningcao
- Maslog Elementary School — Maslog
- San Antonio Elementary School — San Antonio
- Sibulan Central Elementary School — Yapsutco Street, Poblacion
- Tubigon Elementary School — Tubigon
- Tubtubon Elementary School — Tubtubon

High schools:

- Ajong National High School — Ajong
- Bolocboloc High School — Bolocboloc
- Dr. Benjamin T. Locsin High School — Maslog
- Enrique Villanueva High School — Sitio Tubod, Enrique Villanueva
- Maningcao National High School — Maningcao
- San Antonio National High School — San Antonio
- Sibulan National High School — Osmeña Street, Poblacion
- Sibulan NHS - Balugo Extension — Balugo
- Sibulan Night High School — Diputado Street, Poblacion
- Sibulan Science High School — Campaclan, Poblacion
- Tubigon High School — Tubigon

== Gallery ==
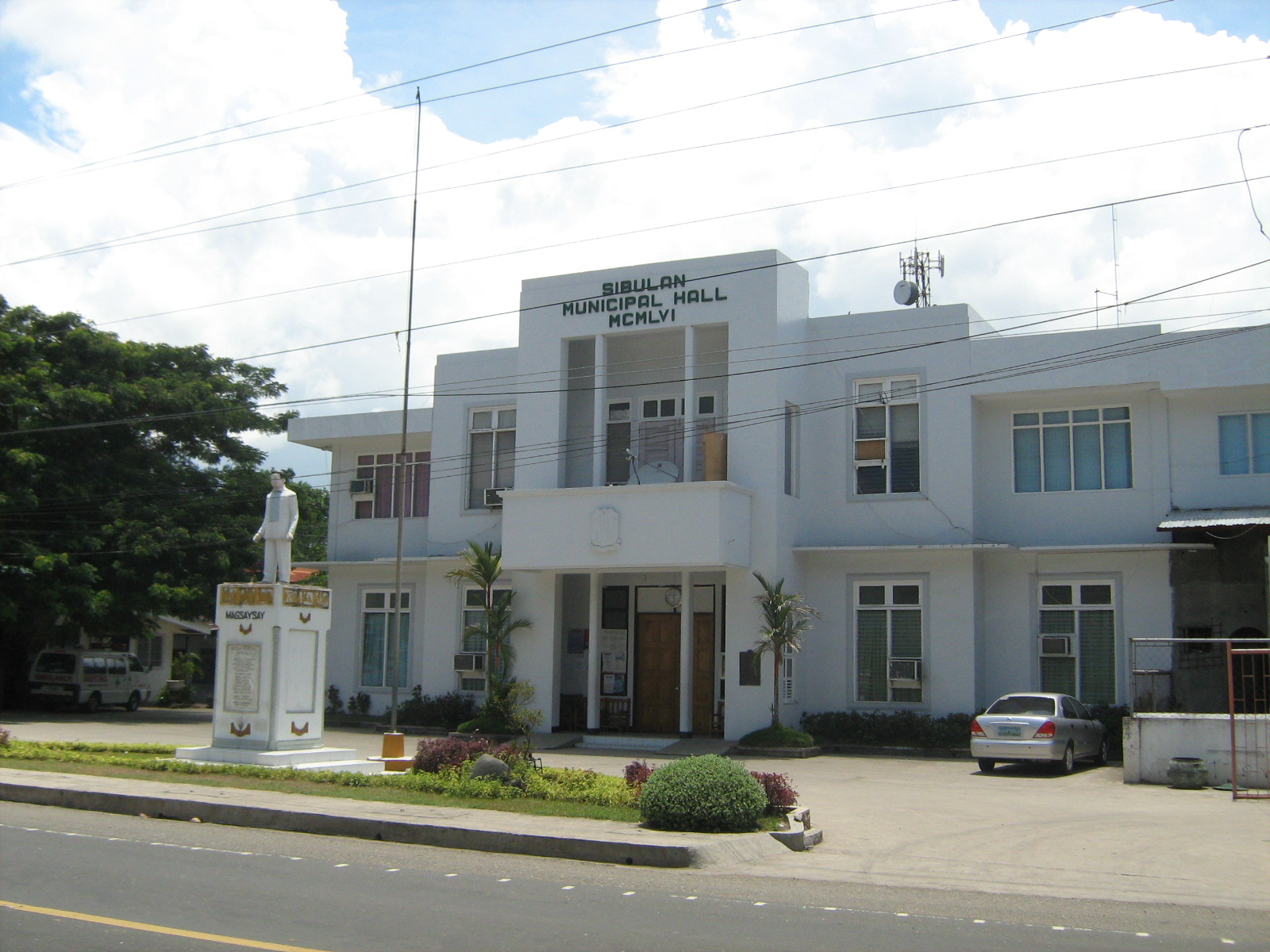
Municipal hall

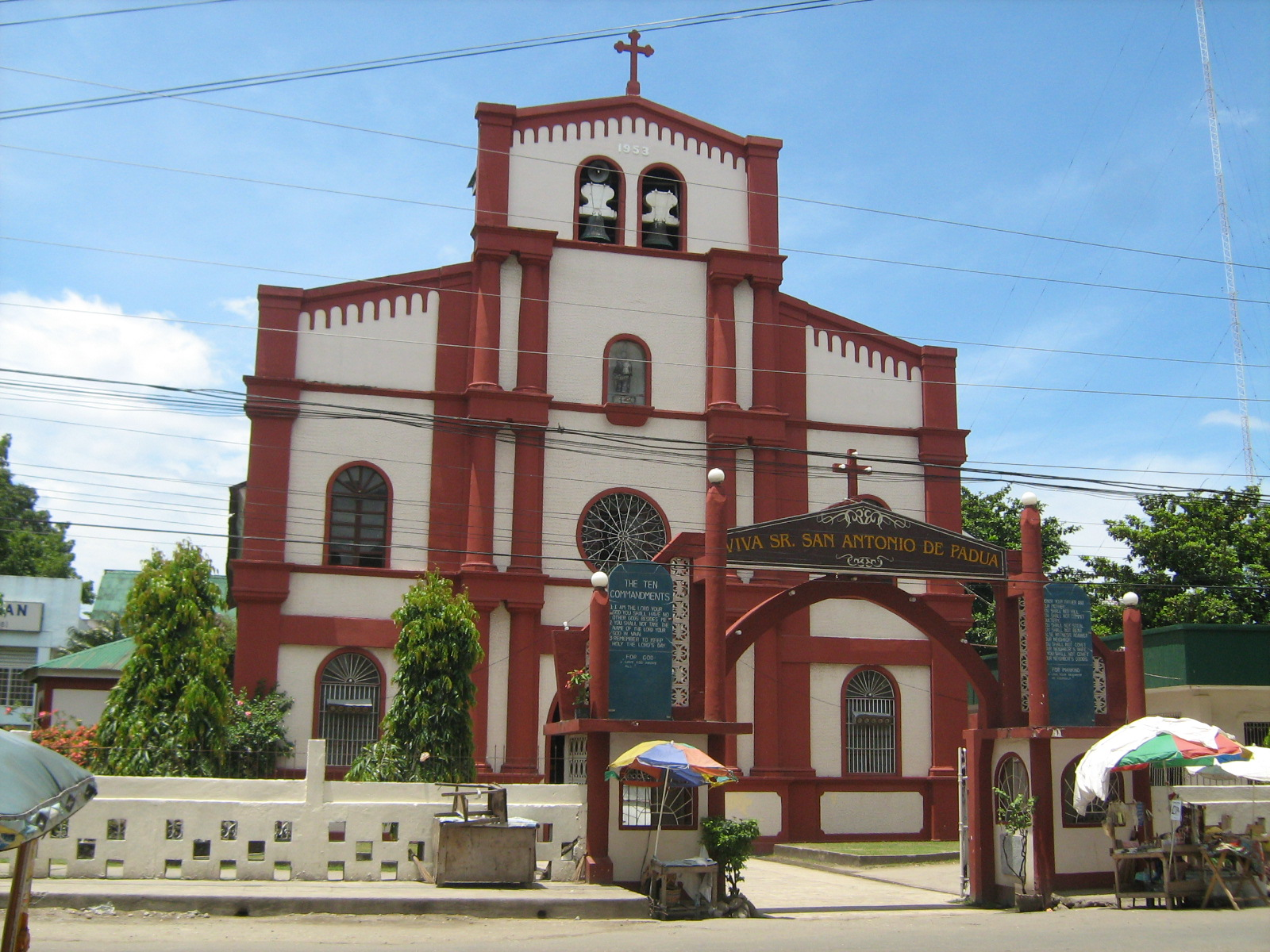
San Antonio de Padua Church

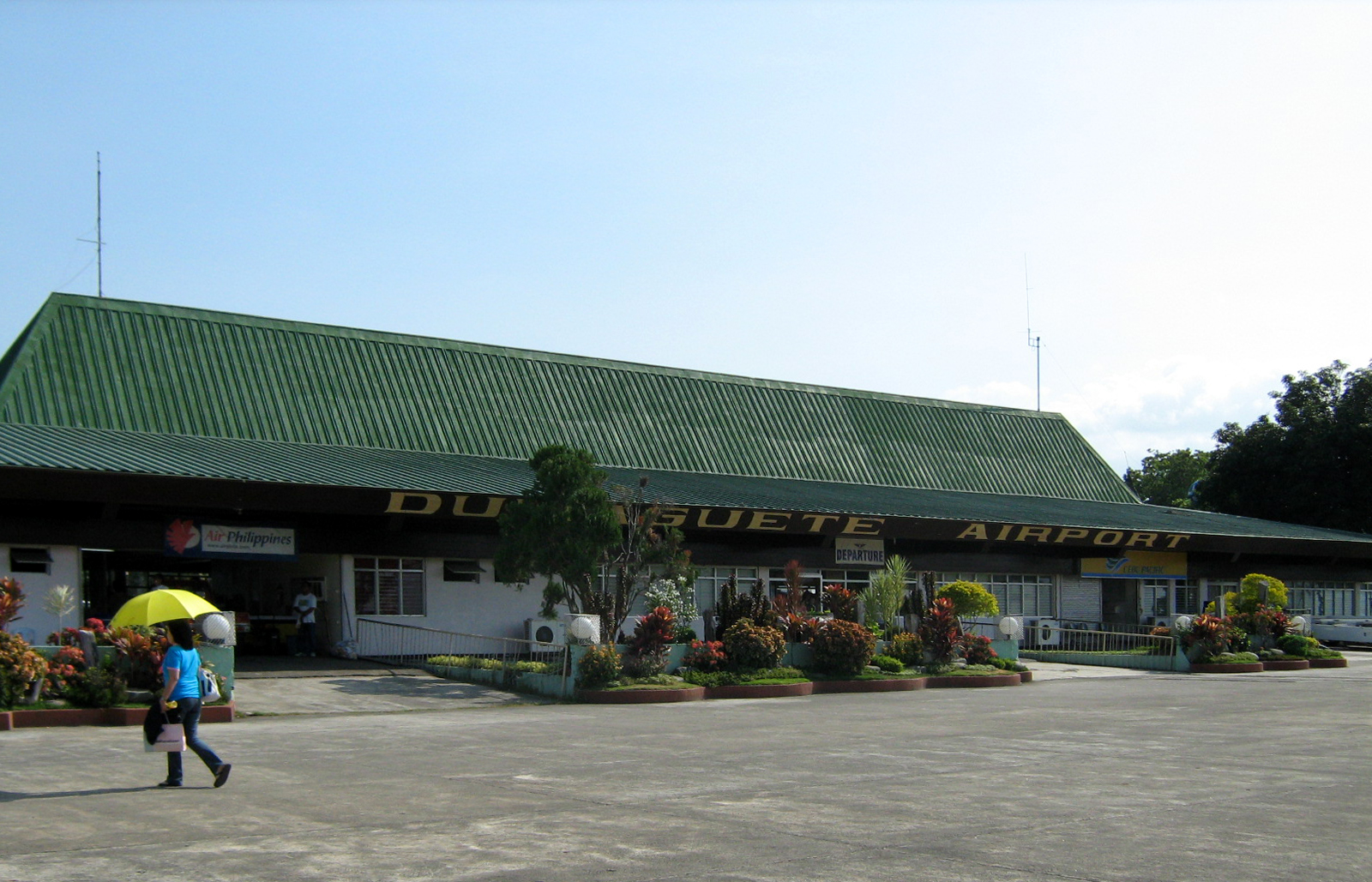
Sibulan Airport

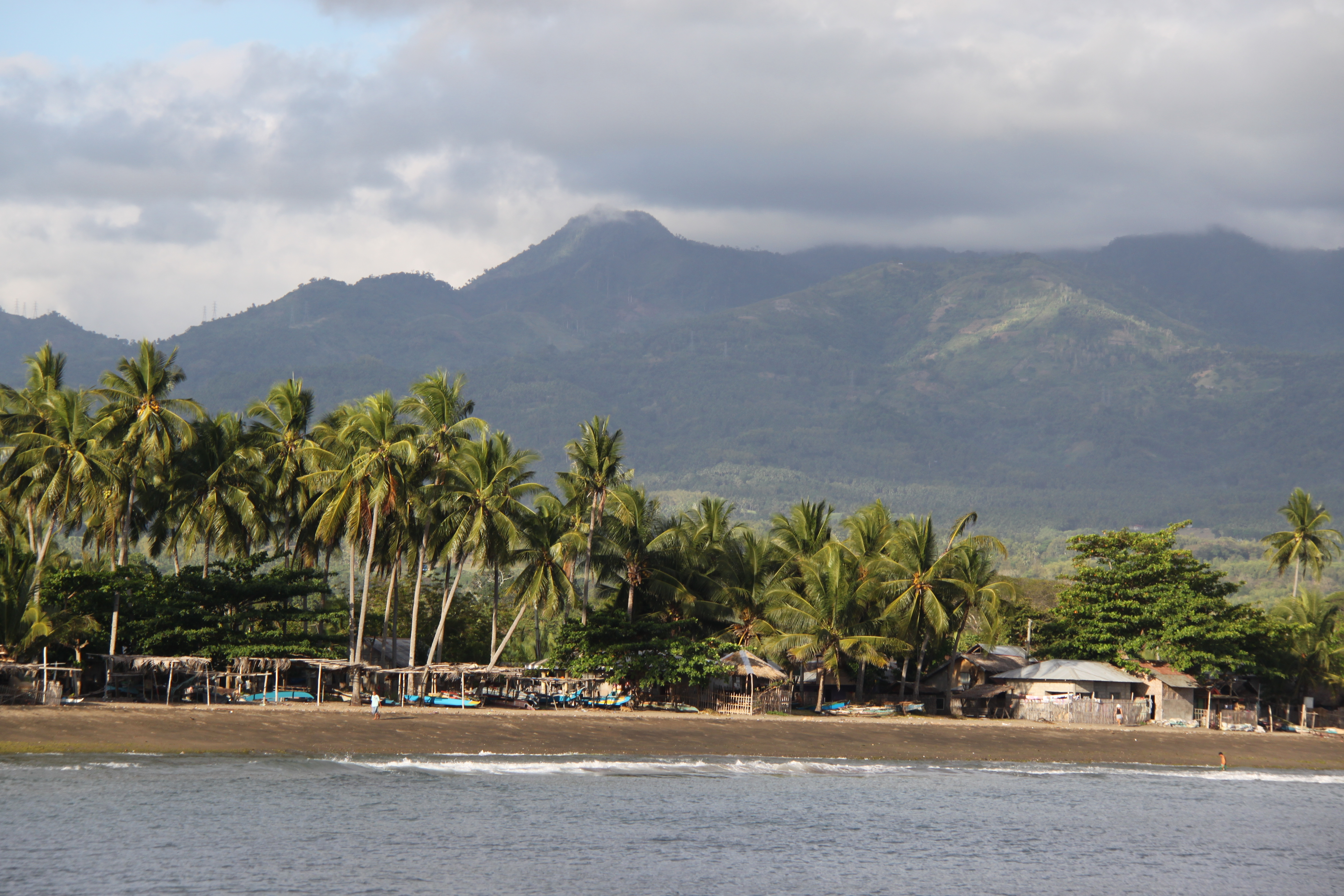
Sibulan shoreline

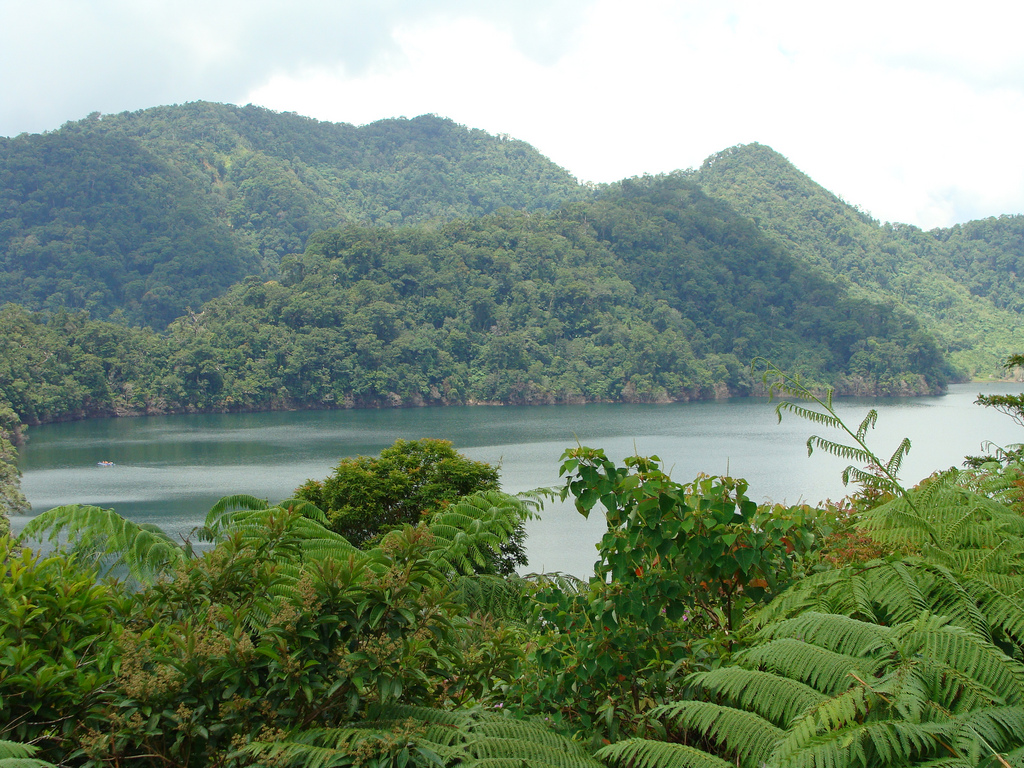
Lake Balinsasayao
