= Negros Oriental's 2nd congressional district =

Legislative district of the Philippines

Negros Oriental's 2nd Congressional District
- Constituency for the House of Representatives of the Philippines
- Location of Negros Oriental within the Philippines
- Province: Negros Oriental
- Region: Negros Island Region
- Population: 535,632 (2020)
- Electorate: 364,529 (2022)
- Major settlements: 8 LGUs: Cities; Bais; Dumaguete; Tanjay; Municipalities; Amlan; Mabinay; Pamplona; San Jose; Sibulan
- Area: 1,480.26 km^{2} (571.53 sq mi)

Current constituency
- Created: 1907
- Representative / Assemblyman: Maisa Sagarbarria
- Political party: Lakas
- Congressional bloc: Majority

Negros Oriental's 2nd Congressional District is one of the three congressional districts of the Philippines in the province of Negros Oriental. It has been represented in the House of Representatives of the Philippines since 1916 and earlier in the Philippine Assembly from 1907 to 1916. The district consists of the provincial capital city of Dumaguete, the cities of Bais and Tanjay, and adjacent municipalities of Amlan, Mabinay, Pamplona, San Jose and Sibulan. It is currently represented in the 20th Congress by Maisa Sagarbarria of Lakas-CMD (Lakas).

== Representation history ==
#	Image	Member	Term of office		Legislature	Party	Electoral history	Constituent LGUs
#	Image	Member	Start	End	Legislature	Party	Electoral history	Constituent LGUs
=== Negros Oriental's 2nd district for the Philippine Assembly ===
District created January 9, 1907.
1		Vicente Locsin y Armada, Sr.	October 16, 1907	October 16, 1909	1st	Progresista	Elected in 1907.	1907–1909; Bacong, Dauin, Larena, Lazi, Nueva Valencia, Siaton, Siquijor, Tolong Nuevo
2		Teofisto Guingona Sr.	October 16, 1909	April 9, 1914	2nd	Progresista	Elected in 1909.	1909–1916; Bacong, Dauin, Larena, Lazi, Maria, Nueva Valencia, San Juan, Siaton, Siquijor, Tolong Nuevo, Zamboanguita
2		Teofisto Guingona Sr.	October 16, 1909	April 9, 1914	3rd	Progresista	Re-elected in 1912. Resigned on appointment as Agusan governor.	1909–1916; Bacong, Dauin, Larena, Lazi, Maria, Nueva Valencia, San Juan, Siaton, Siquijor, Tolong Nuevo, Zamboanguita
3		Leopoldo Rovira y Blanco	October 1, 1914	October 16, 1916	3rd	Progresista	Elected in 1914 to finish Guingona's term.	1909–1916; Bacong, Dauin, Larena, Lazi, Maria, Nueva Valencia, San Juan, Siaton, Siquijor, Tolong Nuevo, Zamboanguita
=== Negros Oriental's 2nd district for the House of Representatives of the Philippine Islands ===
4		Felipe Tayko	October 16, 1916	June 3, 1919	4th	Progresista	Elected in 1916.	1916–1922; Bacong, Dauin, Larena, Lazi, Maria, Nueva Valencia, San Juan, Siaton, Siquijor, Tolong Nuevo, Zamboanguita
5		Pedro Teves y Macías	June 3, 1919	June 6, 1922	5th	Nacionalista	Elected in 1919.	1916–1922; Bacong, Dauin, Larena, Lazi, Maria, Nueva Valencia, San Juan, Siaton, Siquijor, Tolong Nuevo, Zamboanguita
6		Fermín Martínez y Legazpi	June 6, 1922	June 2, 1925	6th	Nacionalista; Colectivista	Elected in 1922.	1922–1925; Bacong, Dauin, Larena, Lazi, Luzurriaga, Maria, San Juan, Siaton, Siquijor, Tolong Nuevo, Zamboanguita
7		Enrique Cayetano Villanueva y Teves	June 2, 1925	June 2, 1931	7th	Nacionalista; Consolidado	Elected in 1925.	1925–1931; Bacong, Dauin, Larena, Lazi, Luzurriaga, Maria, San Juan, Siaton, Siquijor, Talingting, Tolong Nuevo, Zamboanguita
7		Enrique Cayetano Villanueva y Teves	June 2, 1925	June 2, 1931	8th	Nacionalista; Consolidado	Re-elected in 1928.	1925–1931; Bacong, Dauin, Larena, Lazi, Luzurriaga, Maria, San Juan, Siaton, Siquijor, Talingting, Tolong Nuevo, Zamboanguita
8		José María Emeterio Romero y Muñoz	June 2, 1931	September 16, 1935	9th	Nacionalista; Consolidado	Elected in 1931.	1931–1935; Bacong, Dauin, Enrique Villanueva, Larena, Lazi, Luzurriaga, Maria, San Juan, Siaton, Siquijor, Tolong Nuevo, Zamboanguita
8		José María Emeterio Romero y Muñoz	June 2, 1931	September 16, 1935	10th	Nacionalista; Democrático	Re-elected in 1934.	1931–1935; Bacong, Dauin, Enrique Villanueva, Larena, Lazi, Luzurriaga, Maria, San Juan, Siaton, Siquijor, Tolong Nuevo, Zamboanguita
#	Image	Member	Term of office		National Assembly	Party	Electoral history	Constituent LGUs
#	Image	Member	Start	End	National Assembly	Party	Electoral history	Constituent LGUs
=== Negros Oriental's 2nd district for the National Assembly (Commonwealth of the Philippines) ===
(8)		José María Emeterio Romero y Muñoz	September 16, 1935	December 30, 1941	1st	Nacionalista; Democrático	Re-elected in 1935.	1935–1941; Bacong, Dauin, Enrique Villanueva, Larena, Lazi, Luzurriaga, Maria, San Juan, Siaton, Siquijor, Tolong Nuevo, Zamboanguita
(8)		José María Emeterio Romero y Muñoz	September 16, 1935	December 30, 1941	2nd	Nacionalista	Re-elected in 1938.	1935–1941; Bacong, Dauin, Enrique Villanueva, Larena, Lazi, Luzurriaga, Maria, San Juan, Siaton, Siquijor, Tolong Nuevo, Zamboanguita
District dissolved into the two-seat Negros Oriental's at-large district for the National Assembly (Second Philippine Republic).
#	Image	Member	Term of office		Common wealth Congress	Party	Electoral history	Constituent LGUs
#	Image	Member	Start	End	Common wealth Congress	Party	Electoral history	Constituent LGUs
=== Negros Oriental's 2nd district for the House of Representatives of the Commonwealth of the Philippines ===
District re-created May 24, 1945.
(8)		José María Emeterio Romero y Muñoz	June 11, 1945	May 25, 1946	1st	Nacionalista	Re-elected in 1941.	1945–1946; Bacong, Dauin, Enrique Villanueva, Larena, Lazi, Luzurriaga, Maria, San Juan, Siaton, Siquijor, Tolong Nuevo, Zamboanguita
#	Image	Member	Term of office		Congress	Party	Electoral history	Constituent LGUs
#	Image	Member	Start	End	Congress	Party	Electoral history	Constituent LGUs
=== Negros Oriental's 2nd district for the House of Representatives of the Philippines ===
9		Enrique Medina y del Prado	May 25, 1946	December 30, 1953	1st	Liberal	Elected in 1946.	1946–1949; Bacong, Dauin, Enrique Villanueva, Larena, Lazi, Luzurriaga, Maria, San Juan, Siaton, Siquijor, Tolong Nuevo, Zamboanguita
9		Enrique Medina y del Prado	May 25, 1946	December 30, 1953	2nd	Liberal	Re-elected in 1949.	1949–1953; Bacong, Dauin, Enrique Villanueva, Larena, Lazi, Maria, San Juan, Santa Catalina, Siaton, Siquijor, Tolong Nuevo, Valencia, Zamboanguita
10		Lamberto Macías y Lajato	December 30, 1953	September 23, 1972	3rd	Nacionalista	Elected in 1953.	1953–1969; Bacong, Bayawan, Dauin, Enrique Villanueva, Larena, Lazi, Maria, San Juan, Santa Catalina, Siaton, Siquijor, Valencia, Zamboanguita
10		Lamberto Macías y Lajato	December 30, 1953	September 23, 1972	4th	Nacionalista	Re-elected in 1957.	1953–1969; Bacong, Bayawan, Dauin, Enrique Villanueva, Larena, Lazi, Maria, San Juan, Santa Catalina, Siaton, Siquijor, Valencia, Zamboanguita
10		Lamberto Macías y Lajato	December 30, 1953	September 23, 1972	5th	Nacionalista	Re-elected in 1961.	1953–1969; Bacong, Bayawan, Dauin, Enrique Villanueva, Larena, Lazi, Maria, San Juan, Santa Catalina, Siaton, Siquijor, Valencia, Zamboanguita
10		Lamberto Macías y Lajato	December 30, 1953	September 23, 1972	6th	Nacionalista	Re-elected in 1965.	1953–1969; Bacong, Bayawan, Dauin, Enrique Villanueva, Larena, Lazi, Maria, San Juan, Santa Catalina, Siaton, Siquijor, Valencia, Zamboanguita
10		Lamberto Macías y Lajato	December 30, 1953	September 23, 1972	7th	Nacionalista	Re-elected in 1969. Removed from office after imposition of martial law.	1969–1972; Bacong, Basay, Bayawan, Dauin, Enrique Villanueva, Larena, Lazi, Maria, San Juan, Santa Catalina, Siaton, Siquijor, Valencia, Zamboanguita
District dissolved into the thirteen-seat Region VII's at-large district for the Interim Batasang Pambansa, followed by the three-seat Negros Oriental's at-large district for the Regular Batasang Pambansa.
District re-created February 2, 1987.
11		Miguel Luis Romero y Robillos	June 30, 1987	June 30, 1998	8th	Lakas ng Bansa	Elected in 1987.	1987–present Amlan, Bais, Dumaguete, Mabinay, Pamplona, San Jose, Sibulan, Tanjay
11		Miguel Luis Romero y Robillos	June 30, 1987	June 30, 1998	9th	Lakas	Re-elected in 1992.	1987–present Amlan, Bais, Dumaguete, Mabinay, Pamplona, San Jose, Sibulan, Tanjay
11		Miguel Luis Romero y Robillos	June 30, 1987	June 30, 1998	10th	LDP	Re-elected in 1995.	1987–present Amlan, Bais, Dumaguete, Mabinay, Pamplona, San Jose, Sibulan, Tanjay
12		Emilio Macías y Cabrera, II	June 30, 1998	June 30, 2007	11th	NPC	Elected in 1998.	1987–present Amlan, Bais, Dumaguete, Mabinay, Pamplona, San Jose, Sibulan, Tanjay
12		Emilio Macías y Cabrera, II	June 30, 1998	June 30, 2007	12th	NPC	Re-elected in 2001.	1987–present Amlan, Bais, Dumaguete, Mabinay, Pamplona, San Jose, Sibulan, Tanjay
12		Emilio Macías y Cabrera, II	June 30, 1998	June 30, 2007	13th	NPC	Re-elected in 2004.	1987–present Amlan, Bais, Dumaguete, Mabinay, Pamplona, San Jose, Sibulan, Tanjay
13		George Arnáiz y Planto	June 30, 2007	June 30, 2016	14th	NPC	Elected in 2007.	1987–present Amlan, Bais, Dumaguete, Mabinay, Pamplona, San Jose, Sibulan, Tanjay
13		George Arnáiz y Planto	June 30, 2007	June 30, 2016	15th	NPC	Re-elected in 2010.	1987–present Amlan, Bais, Dumaguete, Mabinay, Pamplona, San Jose, Sibulan, Tanjay
13		George Arnáiz y Planto	June 30, 2007	June 30, 2016	16th	NPC	Re-elected in 2013.	1987–present Amlan, Bais, Dumaguete, Mabinay, Pamplona, San Jose, Sibulan, Tanjay
14		Manuel Sagarbarría y Teves	June 30, 2016	June 30, 2025	17th	NPC	Elected in 2016.	1987–present Amlan, Bais, Dumaguete, Mabinay, Pamplona, San Jose, Sibulan, Tanjay
14		Manuel Sagarbarría y Teves	June 30, 2016	June 30, 2025	18th	NPC	Re-elected in 2019.	1987–present Amlan, Bais, Dumaguete, Mabinay, Pamplona, San Jose, Sibulan, Tanjay
14		Manuel Sagarbarría y Teves	June 30, 2016	June 30, 2025	19th	NPC	Re-elected in 2022.	1987–present Amlan, Bais, Dumaguete, Mabinay, Pamplona, San Jose, Sibulan, Tanjay
15		Maisa Sagarbarria	June 30, 2025	Incumbent	20th	Lakas	Elected in 2025.	1987–present Amlan, Bais, Dumaguete, Mabinay, Pamplona, San Jose, Sibulan, Tanjay

== Election results ==
=== 2025 ===
2025 Philippine House of Representatives elections
Party	Candidate	Votes	%
Lakas	Maisa Sagarbarria	159,190	16.31%
Liberal	Felipe Antonio "Ipe" B. Remollo	104,694	10.72%
Independent	Jimmy Merto	3,161	0.32%
Independent	Islao Ryan Ybañez	3,106	0.32%
Total votes		270,151	100.00%
Lakas hold			

=== 2022 ===
2022 Philippine House of Representatives elections
Party	Candidate	Votes	%
NPC	Manuel "Chiquiting" T. Sagarbarria (incumbent)	160,262	60.68%
Independent	George Arnaiz	103,848	39.32%
Total votes		264,110	100.00%
NPC hold			

=== 2019 ===
2019 Philippine House of Representatives elections
Party	Candidate	Votes	%
NPC	Manuel "Chiquiting" T. Sagarbarria (incumbent)	168,434	
Independent	Jimmy Merto	7,394	
Independent	Ryan Ybañez	6,823	
Total votes			100.00%
NPC hold			

=== 2016 ===
2016 Philippine House of Representatives elections
Party	Candidate	Votes	%
NPC	Manuel "Chiquiting" T. Sagarbarria	75,077	37.89%
Independent	Ismail Amolat	72,548	36.61%
NUP	Erwin Michael Macias	46,936	23.69%
Independent	Ybañez Ryan	2,060	1.03%
Independent	Samuel Torres	1,498	0.75%
Invalid or blank votes		58,011	
Total votes		256,130	100.00%
NPC hold			

=== 2013 ===
2013 Philippine House of Representatives elections
Party	Candidate	Votes	%
NPC	George Arnaiz	68,630	45.67
Liberal	Karen Villanueva	53,462	35.57
Independent	Raul Aniñon	1,422	0.95
Margin of victory		15,168	10.09%
Invalid or blank votes		26,776	17.82
Total votes		150,290	100.00
NPC hold			

=== 2010 ===
2010 Philippine House of Representatives elections
Party	Candidate	Votes	%
NPC	George Arnaiz	115,384	59.26
Liberal	Hector Villanueva	76,680	39.38
Independent	Raul Aniñon	1,436	0.74
Independent	Himiniano Silva	1,203	0.62
Valid ballots		194,703	91.47
Invalid or blank votes		18,150	8.53
Total votes		212,853	100.00
NPC hold			

== See also ==
- Legislative districts of Negros Oriental
