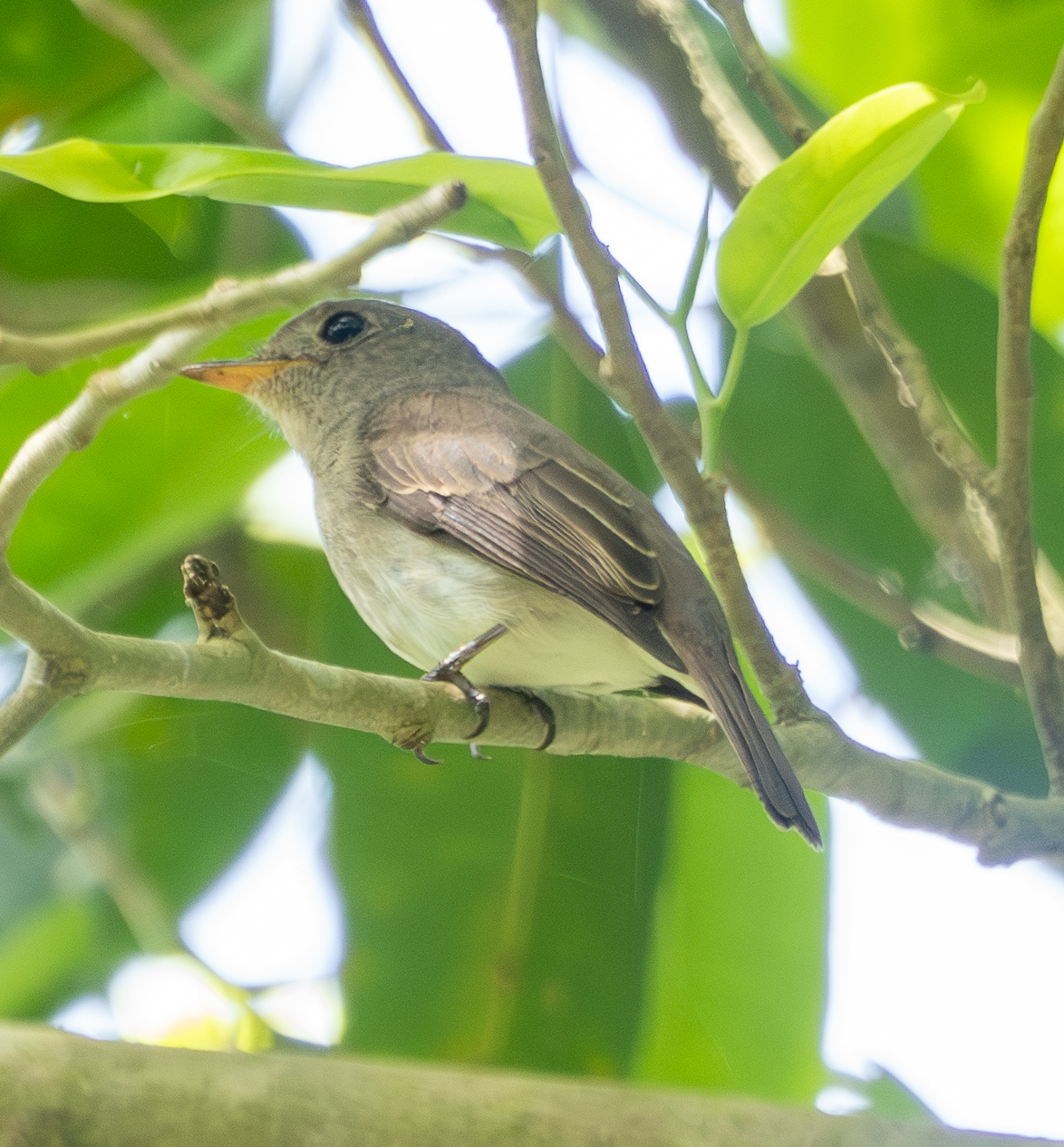

Conservation status
- Vulnerable (IUCN 3.1)

Scientific classification
- Kingdom: Animalia
- Phylum: Chordata
- Class: Aves
- Order: Passeriformes
- Family: Muscicapidae
- Genus: Muscicapa
- Species: M. randi

Binomial name
- Muscicapa randi Amadon & du Pont, 1970

= Ashy-breasted flycatcher =

Species of bird

The ashy-breasted flycatcher (Muscicapa randi) is a species of bird in the family Muscicapidae. It is endemic to the Philippines found only on the islands of Negros and Luzon. Its natural habitat is tropical moist lowland forests where it rarely observed. It is threatened by habitat loss.

== Description and taxonomy ==
The Ashy-breasted flycatcher is a small and drab bird found in the lowland forests of Luzon and Negros. It is primarily grayish brown with a slightly darker wing and the Eponymous ashy breast. It has a white belly and small white throat patch.

It was formerly conspecific with the Asian brown flycatcher and the Sumba flycatcher. It is differentiated from the Asian brown flycatcher, which is migratory and may be found in the same areas, by its shorter wings as the Ashy-breasted is a forest endemic and does not migrate. It also has a slightly longer and orange lower mandible.

== Ecology and behavior ==
This species feeds on small insects. Usually seen alone on in pairs. It forages low in the understorey of clearings and forest edge.

Almost no breeding information except a fledgelings and young birds seen from May to August.

Based on eBird data, this species is seen more frequently during December to February although the implications of this are unknown and may also just be from observer bias.

== Habitat and conservation status ==
It inhabits primary and secondary growth forest up to 1,000 meters above sea level. It exhibits some tolerance to habitat degradation being recorded in clearings. It is often found perching on exposed branches near the canopy. Birds caught in August and September at Dalton Pass, Luzon, suggest that it may undertake intra-island movements, but possibly little more than post-breeding dispersal.

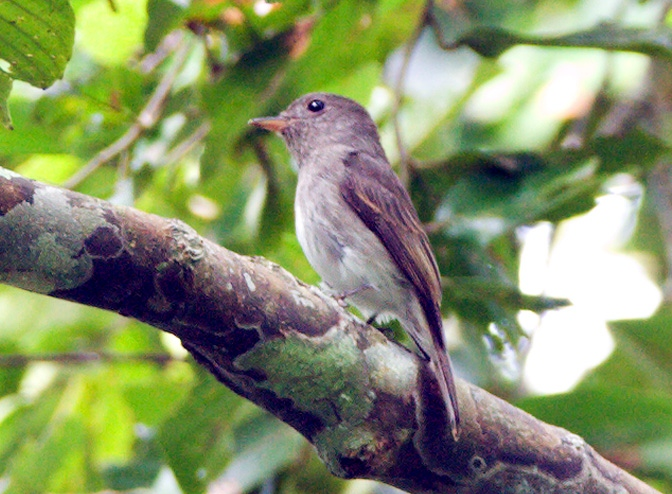

It has been assessed as vulnerable with a population currently between 6,000 and 15,000 and believed to be declining. In 1988, it was estimated that as little as 4% of original forest remained on Negros, 24% on Luzon with these figures continuing to decline. This species' main threat is habitat loss with wholesale clearance of forest habitats as a result of legal and illegal logging, agricultural conversion and mining activities occurring within the range. In 1988, it was estimated that as little as 4% of original forest remained on Negros, 24% on Luzon with these figures continuing to decline.

It has been recorded in a few protected areas including Mount Makiling National Park and Northern Sierra Madre Natural Park, however like most areas in the country, protection against deforestation and hunting is lax. It has also been found in the proposed area of Balinsasayao Twin Lakes Natural Park which has received conservation funding. In January 2026, it was found in La Mesa Ecopark in Metro Manila.

Conservation actions proposed include to re-examine museum specimens of Muscicapa flycatchers from the Philippines to check identification, in order to resolve its anomalous distribution. Survey to further investigate its true distribution and population. Extend the Northern Sierra Madre Natural Park and improve enforcement. Afford formal protection to Balinsasayao Twin Lakes Natural Park.
