= Balinsasayao Twin Lakes Natural Park =

National park in the Philippines

- IUCN category II (national park)
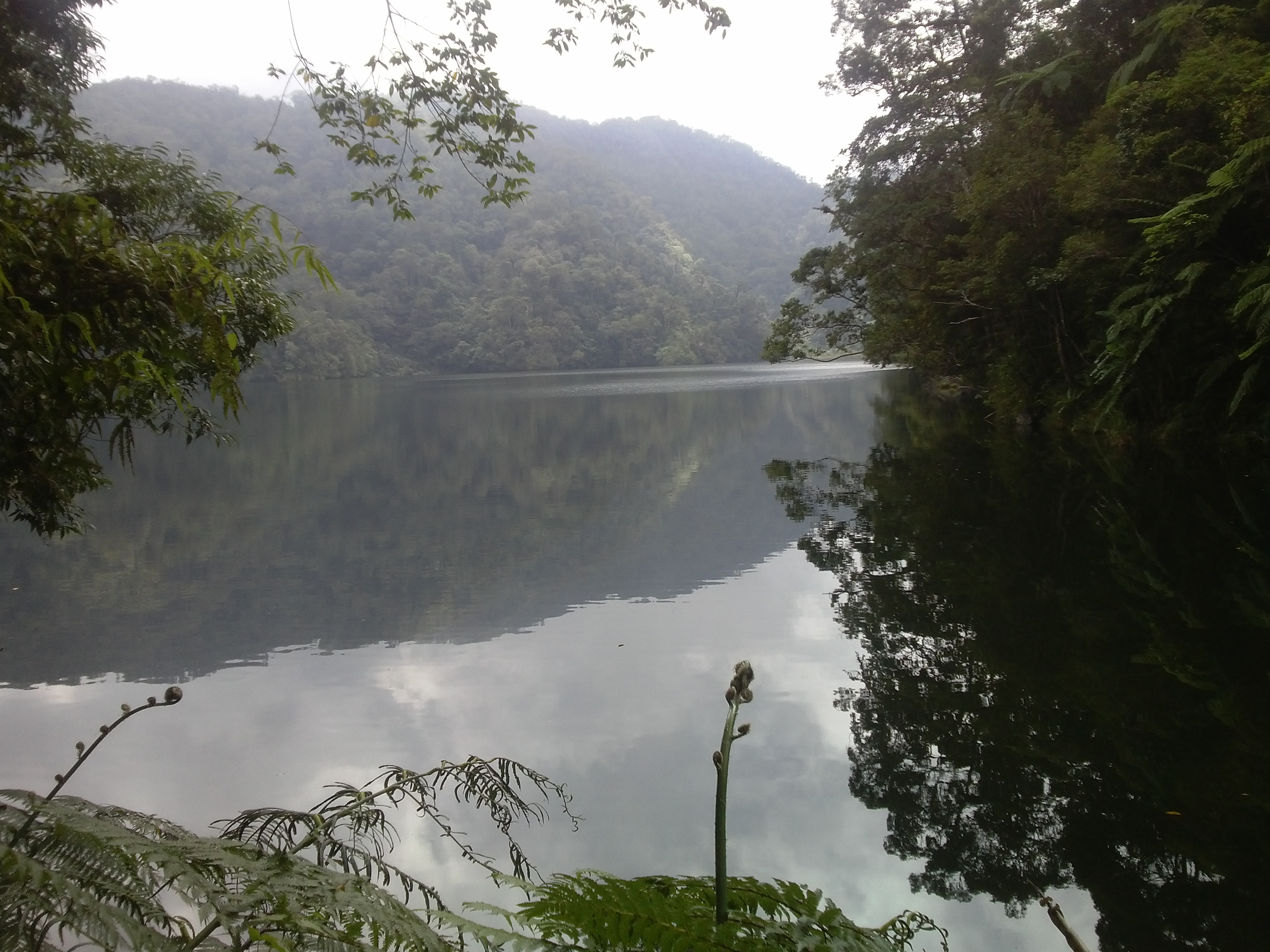
- Lake Danao

- Location within Philippines
- Location: Negros Oriental, Philippines
- Nearest city: Dumaguete
- Coordinates: 9°21′15″N 123°10′46″E
- Area: 8,016.05 hectares (19,808.1 acres)
- Established: November 21, 2000
- Governing body: Department of Environment and Natural Resources
- Website: Balinsasayao Twin Lakes Natural Park

Balinsasayao Twin Lakes Natural Park is a natural park in the Philippines surrounding Lake Balinsasayao and Lake Danao in the province of Negros Oriental, 14.5 kilometres (9.0 mi) west of Dumaguete. It covers an area of 8,016.05 hectares (19,808.1 acres), with heights ranging from 830 to 846 metres (2,723 to 2,776 ft). The park is located in the Mount Talinis range, also known as Cuernos de Negros, in the southern portion of Negros Island, and spans across the municipalities of Valencia, Sibulan and San Jose. It was declared a protected area in 2000. In 2024, the ASEAN Centre for Biodiversity (ACB) included the park in its network of topnotch nature reserves and natural parks in the Southeast Asian region. In 2025, the site was designated as an ASEAN Heritage Park.

== Description ==
Lakes Balinsasayao and Danao are two small crater lakes separated by a narrow mountain ridge in a hollow surrounded by Mount Guintabon to the west, Mount Balinsasayao to the east, Mount Kalbasaan to the north, and Mount Mahungot to the south. They are located on the eastern slope of the Talinis mountain range which are volcanic in origin. Lake Balinsasayao has a surface area of 76 hectares (190 acres) and maximum depth of around 90 metres (300 ft). The smaller Lake Danao, on the other hand, has a surface area of 30 hectares (74 acres) and maximum depth of around 58 metres (190 ft).

The twin lakes and their surrounding primary and secondary dipterocarp forests serve as the watershed for southern Negros Oriental. It contains the headwaters of five major river systems namely, the Amlan, Ayuquitan, Hinotongan, Okoy and Cauitan rivers that provides the water requirements and irrigation of the lowland communities.

The park also contains a portion of the 133,000-hectare (330,000-acre) Negros Geothermal Reservation of the Philippine National Oil Company (now Energy Development Corporation) which supplies the energy needs for Dumaguete and southern Negros.

== Flora and fauna ==
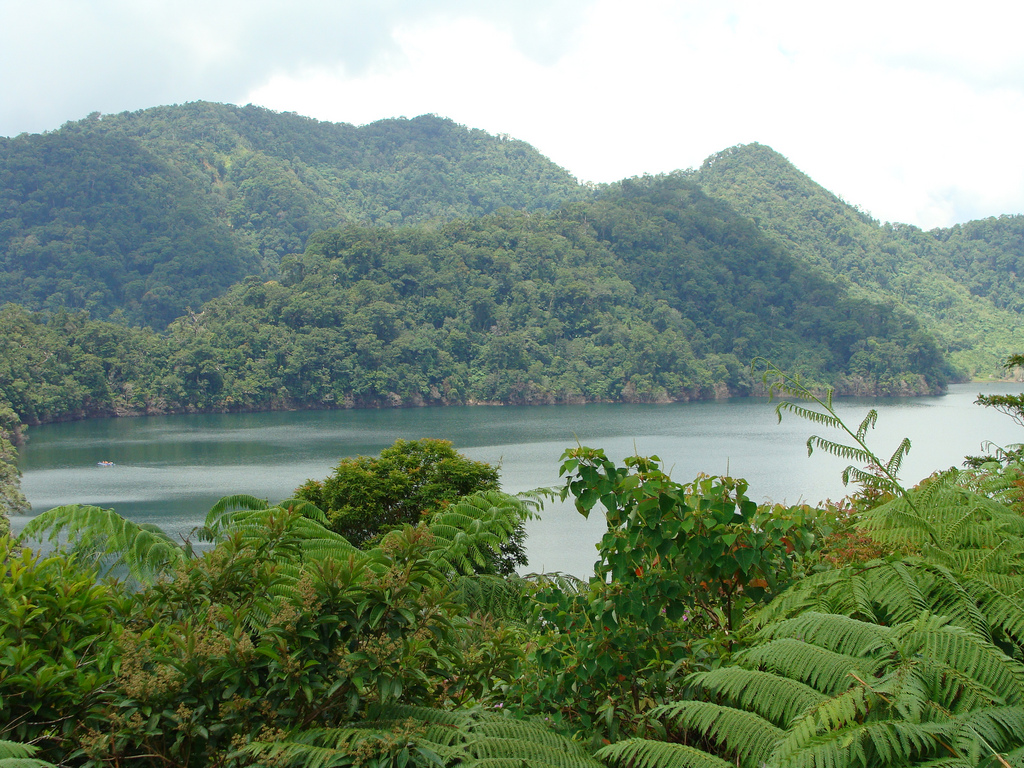
Lake Balinsasayao

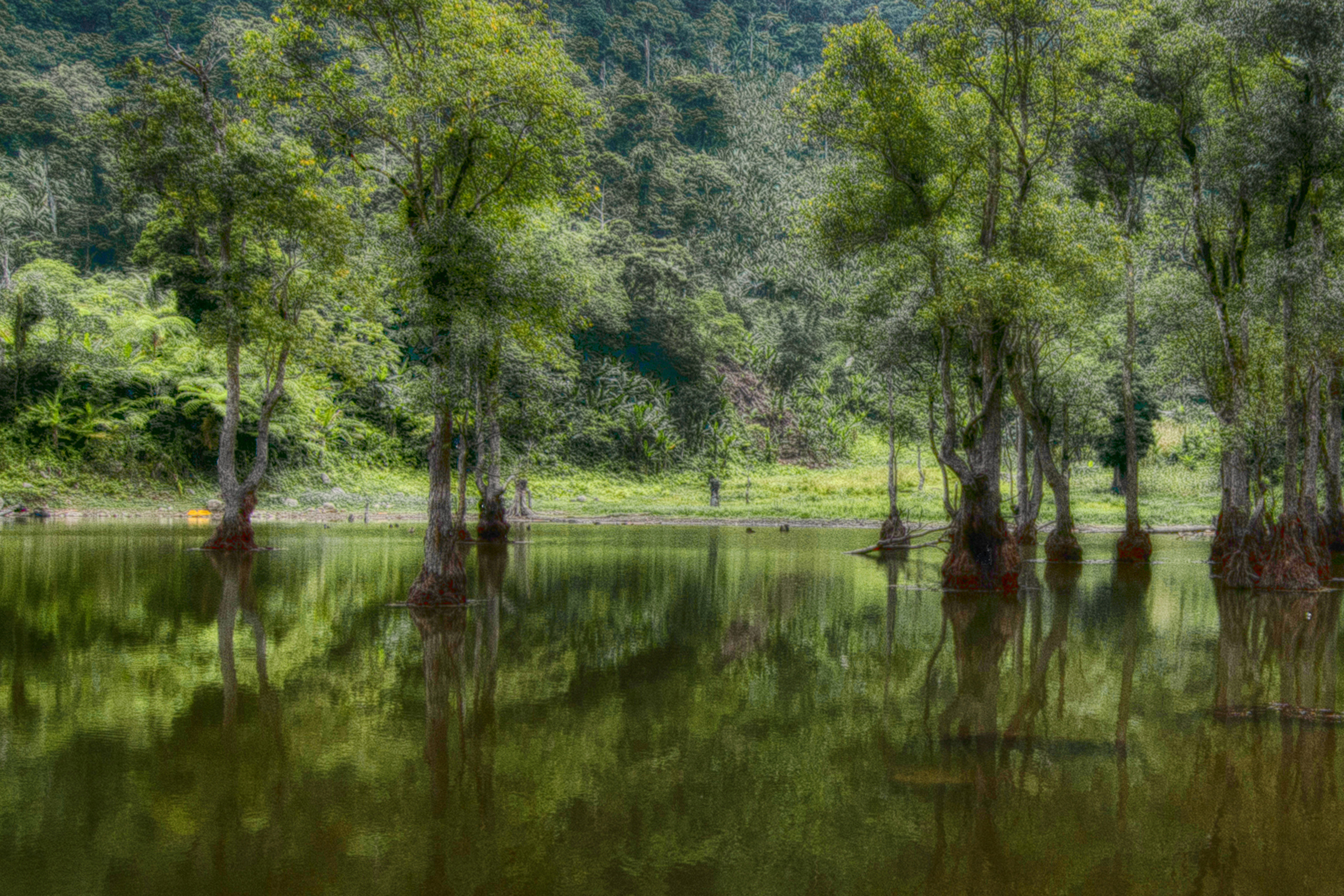
Kabalin-an Pond near the Twin Lakes

The Balinsasayao natural park is an important bird area which supports at least 114 avifauna species including the critically endangered Negros bleeding-heart and Visayan wrinkled hornbill, and other endangered birds such as the Negros striped babbler, flame-templed babbler, Japanese night heron and white-throated jungle flycatcher. It also supports a significant population of Philippine duck, spotted imperial-pigeon, rufous-lored kingfisher, Visayan hornbill, white-winged cuckooshrike, celestial monarch, streaked reed-warbler, ashy-breasted flycatcher, Visayan flowerpecker and Philippine cockatoo.

At least 27 mammalian species have also been documented in the area such as the endangered and endemic Philippine spotted deer, Visayan warty pig, Visayan leopard cat, Negros shrew and large fruit bats such as Philippine naked-backed fruit bat, Philippine tube-nosed fruit bat, giant golden-crowned flying fox and little golden-mantled flying fox.

== See also ==
- List of natural parks of the Philippines
