= Mount Talinis =

Complex volcano in the Philippine province of Negros Occidental

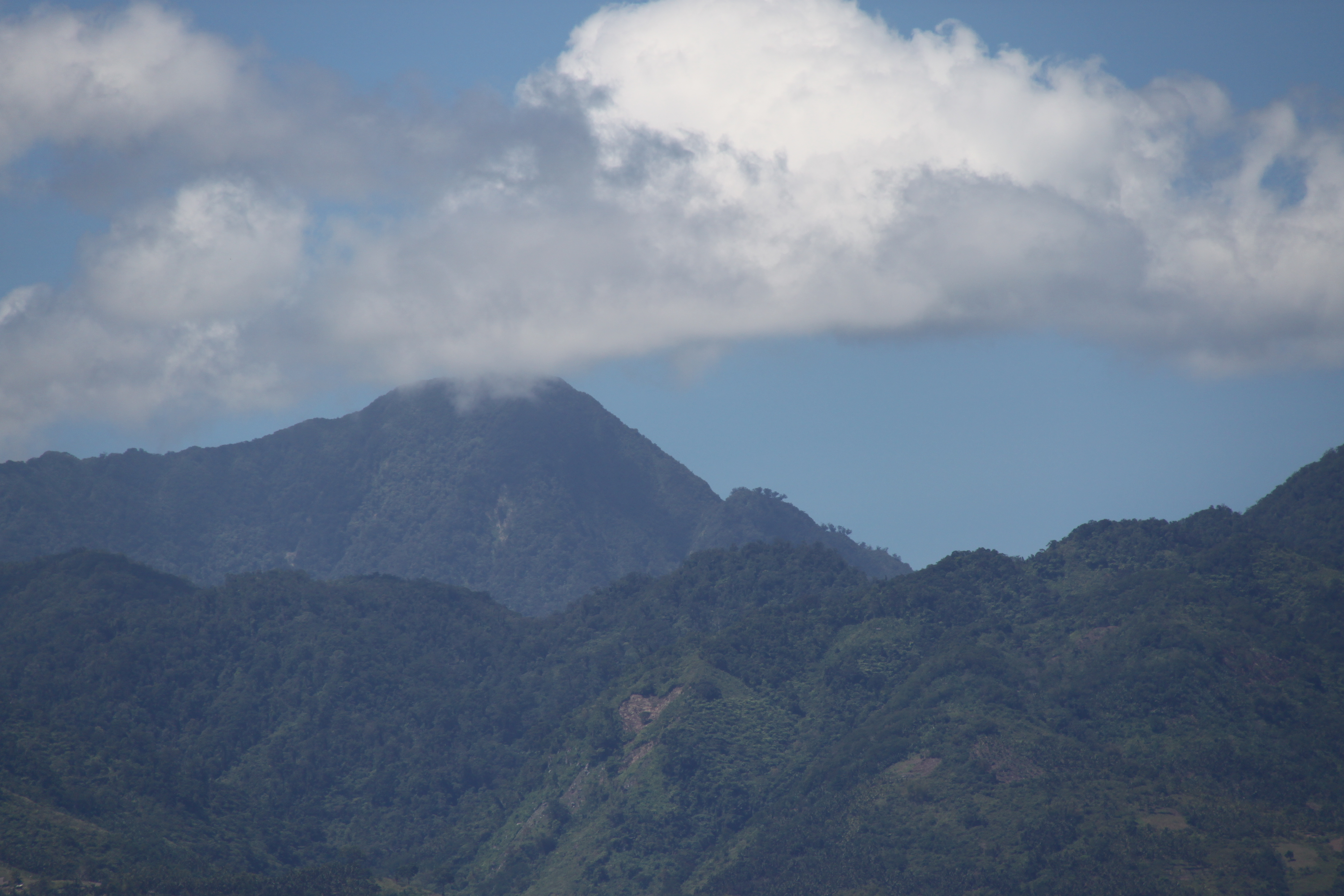

Highest point
- Elevation: 1,862 m (6,109 ft)
- Prominence: 1,442 m (4,731 ft)
- Listing: Potentially active volcano Ribu
- Coordinates: 9°15′0″N 123°10′0″E

Geography
- Location within Philippines
- Location: Negros
- Country: Philippines
- Region: Negros Island Region
- Province: Negros Oriental

Geology
- Rock age: Late Miocene
- Mountain type: Complex volcano
- Volcanic belt: Negros Volcanic Belt
- Last eruption: Unknown

Mount Talinis is a complex volcano in the Philippine province of Negros Oriental. At about 1,862 metres (6,109 ft) above sea level, it is the second highest mountain on Negros Island after Mount Kanlaon, and the tallest peak in the mountain range known as the Cuernos de Negros ("Horns of Negros"). The volcano is located 9 km (5.6 mi) southwest of the municipality of Valencia; and 20 km (12 mi) from Dumaguete, the capital of the province.

== Geology ==
Cuernos de Negros is classified by the Philippine Institute of Volcanology and Seismology as a potentially active volcano forming part of the Negros Volcanic Belt. Andesite and basalt are the most abundant rocks found on the mountain. With a base diameter of 36 kilometres (22 mi), the volcanic complex is composed of several volcanic cones and peaks, the most prominent of which are Talinis, Magaso (also confusingly called "Cuernos de Negros"), Guinsayawan, Yagumyum Peak and Guintabon Dome. The mountain range is very fumarolic with several solfataras and steam vents located on its slope that are harnessed to generate electricity. The Southern Negros Geothermal Production Field in Palinpinon generates 192.5 MW.

== Tourism ==
Cuernos de Negros volcanic complex is popular with visitors for the natural environment of the forest and many volcanic lakes surrounded by mountains.

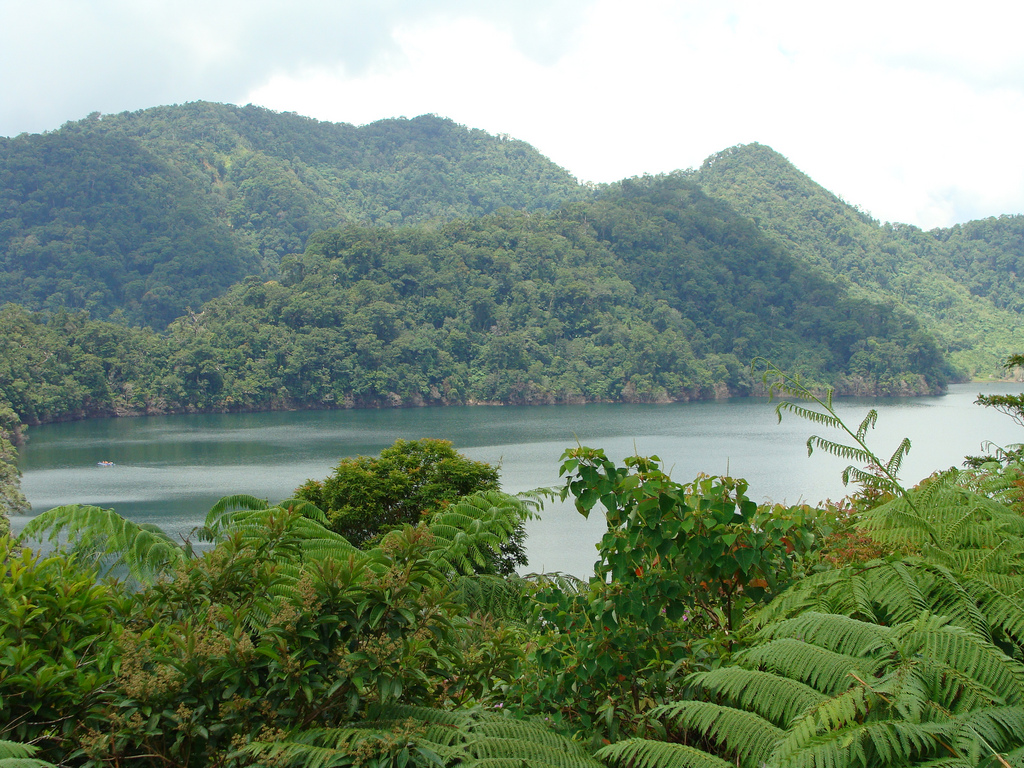
Lake Balinsasayao

=== Balinsasayao Twin Lakes Natural Park ===
Within the volcano complex is Balinsasayao Twin Lakes Natural Park, a national park established on November 21, 2000 by Proclamation No. 414. It is a most visited park of which the twin crater lakes of Balinsasayao and Danao are located, separated only by a narrow mountain ridge. Lake Kabalin-an, a smaller lake, is located before the two lakes. All three lakes are located within the Guintabon Caldera.

=== Hiking Mount Talinis ===
Mt. Talinis is easily climbed via nature trails that start in Bidjao, Dauin and Apolong, Valencia. Several crater lakes exits: Lake Yagumyum is between Yagumyum Peak and the main peak of Cuernos de Negros; Lake Nailig and Lake Mabilog are crater lakes near the summit. Lake Nailig serves as the main camping ground, with the peak accessible by a 30-minute trek. The summit is heavily forested and mostly covered with fog. The Kaipohan sulfur vents, an area of dead trees and bleached rocks, can be found on the trail to Apolong, Valencia.

== Biodiversity ==
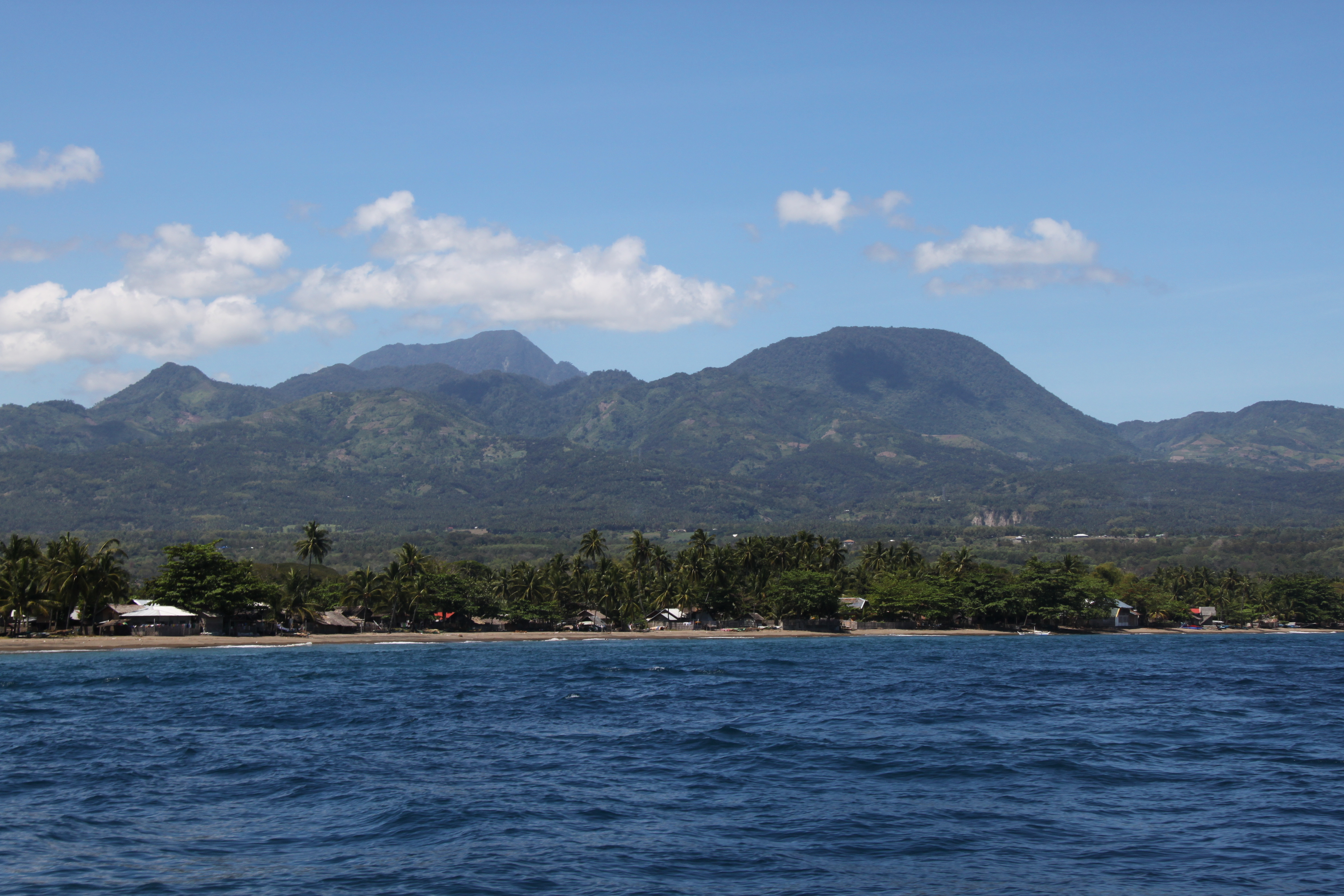
Mount Talinis seen from the Tañon Strait.

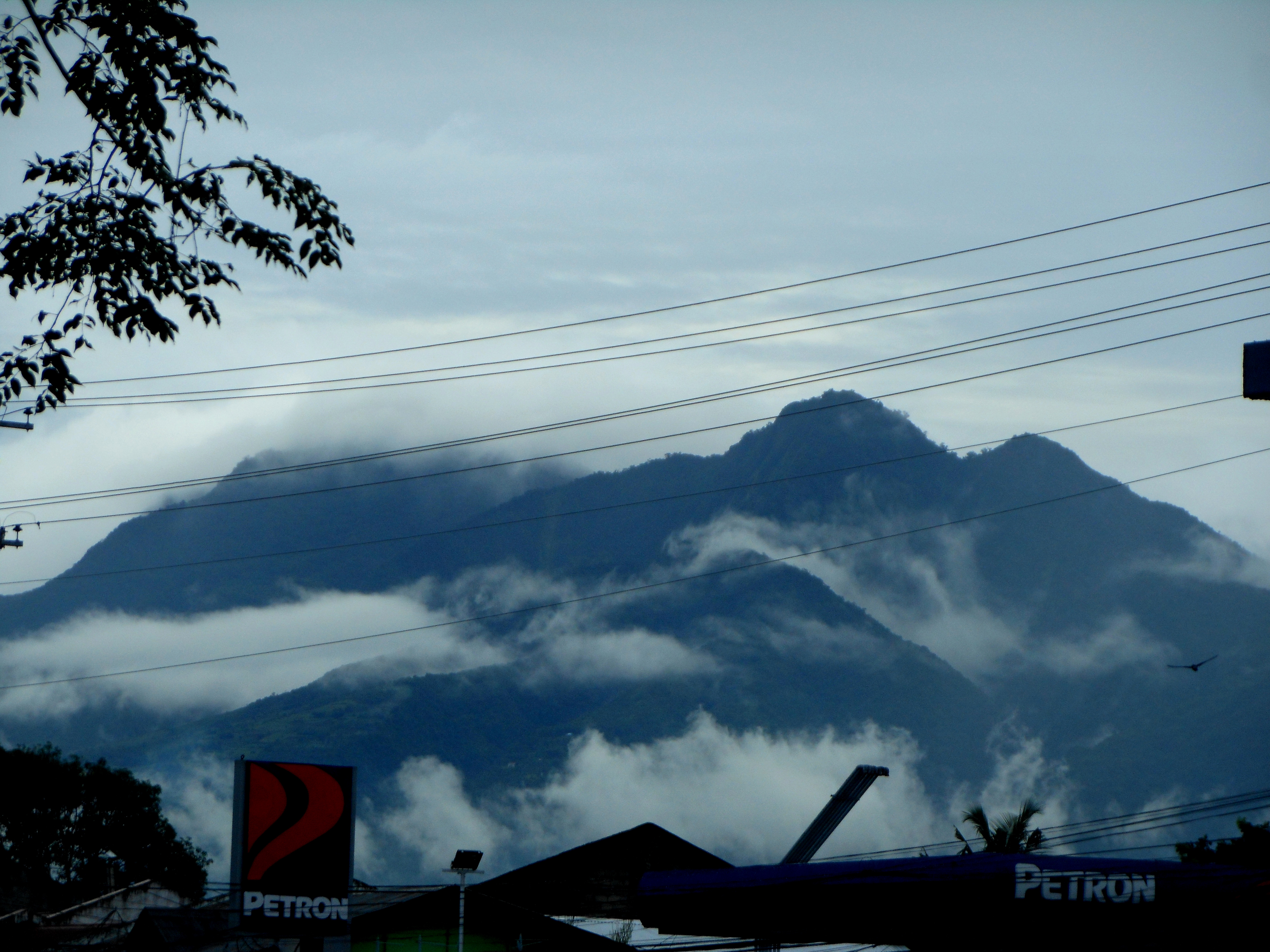
A closer look of Mount Talinis seen from the lowland in 2013.

The region of Mt. Talinis has a rich biodiversity that is threatened by illegal logging, "kaingin", increased tourist activity and the gradual build-up of houses near its forested areas. The lakes around Mt. Talinis contain freshwater shrimp, snails, carp and tilapia species, and its forest system is home to endemic and rare wildlife. There are 91 tree species, 18 of which are commercially important, including Alphonsea arborea, Elaeocarpus monocera, Pometia pinnata, and Phyllocladus hypophyllus and tigerwood. Other notable flora include wild orchids, edible berries and, broad-leafed tree ferns.

Common fauna include boars, civets, chickens, pigeons, monkeys, sunbirds, monitor lizards, bar-bellied cuckoo-shrikes, leopard cats, and the brown weaver ant. Some of the endangered and rare animals are tarictic hornbills, Philippine spotted deers, Visayan warty pigs, Philippine tube-nosed fruit bats, and Negros bleeding-hearts.

== See also ==
- List of active volcanoes in the Philippines
- List of potentially active volcanoes in the Philippines
- List of inactive volcanoes in the Philippines
- Philippine Institute of Volcanology and Seismology
- Lakes in the Philippines
