= Lake Balinsasayao =

Lake in the Philippines

- Danaw sa Balinsasayao (Cebuano); Lawa ng Balinsasayao (Filipino)
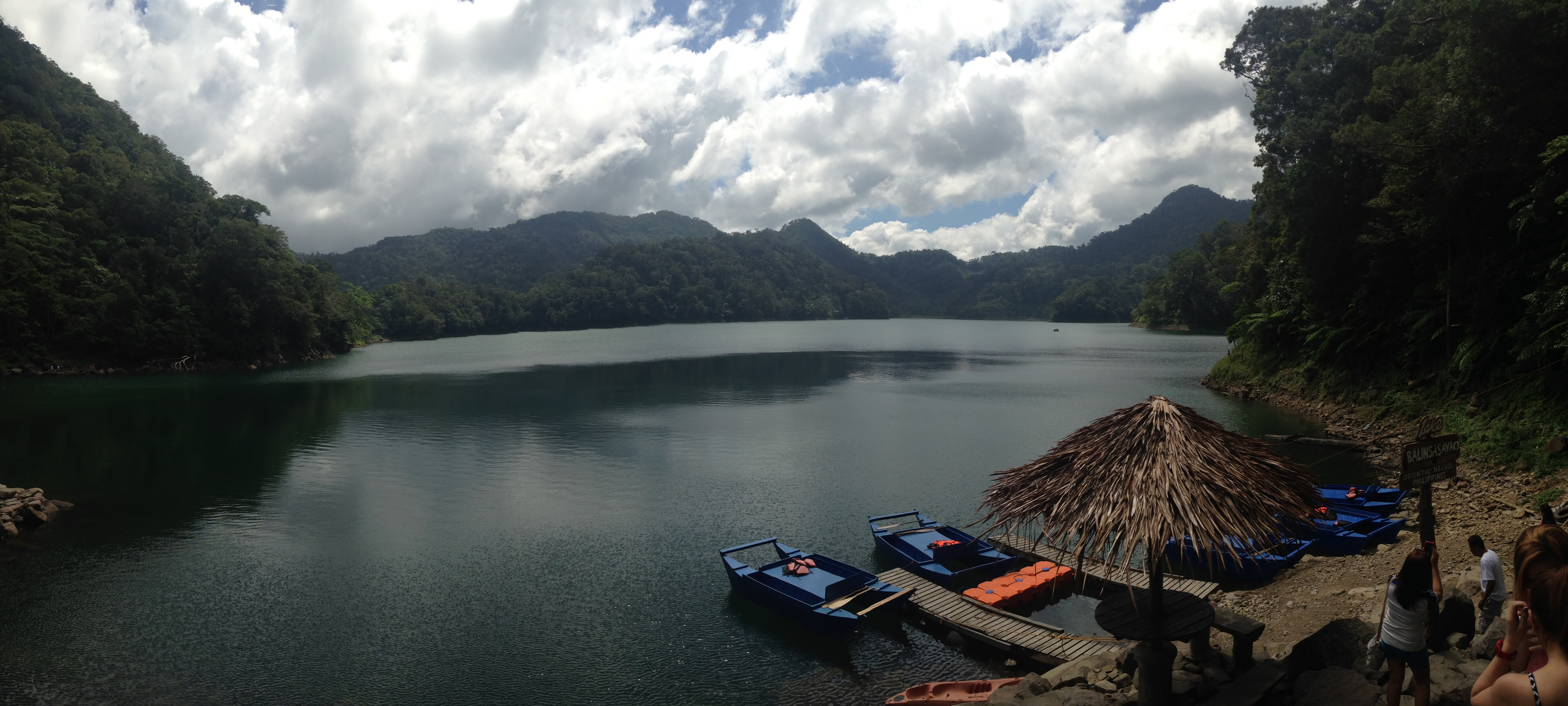

- Location within the Philippines Lake Balinsasayao (Philippines)
- Location: Negros Oriental
- Coordinates: 9°21′11″N 123°10′45″E
- Type: Crater lake
- Basin countries: Philippines
- Max. length: 1.5 kilometres (0.93 mi)
- Max. width: 1 kilometre (0.62 mi)
- Surface area: 76 hectares (190 acres)
- Max. depth: 90 feet (27 m)
- Surface elevation: 1,000 feet (300 m)
- Settlements: Sibulan; Valencia; San Jose

Lake Balinsasayao, is one of three crater lakes rising 1,000 feet (300 m) above sea level located within the Balinsasayao Twin Lakes Natural Park, an 8,016.05-hectare (19,808.1-acre) protected area covering the municipalities of Valencia, Sibulan, and San Jose in the province of Negros Oriental, Philippines. The ASEAN Centre for Biodiversity (ACB) is now listed The Balinsasayao Twin Lakes Natural Park among new parks to its network of topnotch nature reserves and natural parks in the Southeast Asian region in 2024.

== Etymology ==
The name of Lake Balinsasayao is the Spanish transcription of Cebuano balinsasayaw meaning "swiftlet." The name of its "twin", Lake Danao, is derived from Cebuano danaw meaning "lake."

== History ==
Lake Balinsasayao, Lake Danao, and Kabalin-an pond are part of Balinsasayao Twin Lakes Natural Park, a protected area totaling 8,016 hectares (19,810 acres) created on 21 November 2000 by virtue of Proclamation No. 414 signed by former President Joseph Estrada. It lies within the municipalities of Valencia, Sibulan, and San Jose in the province of Negros Oriental.

== Geography ==
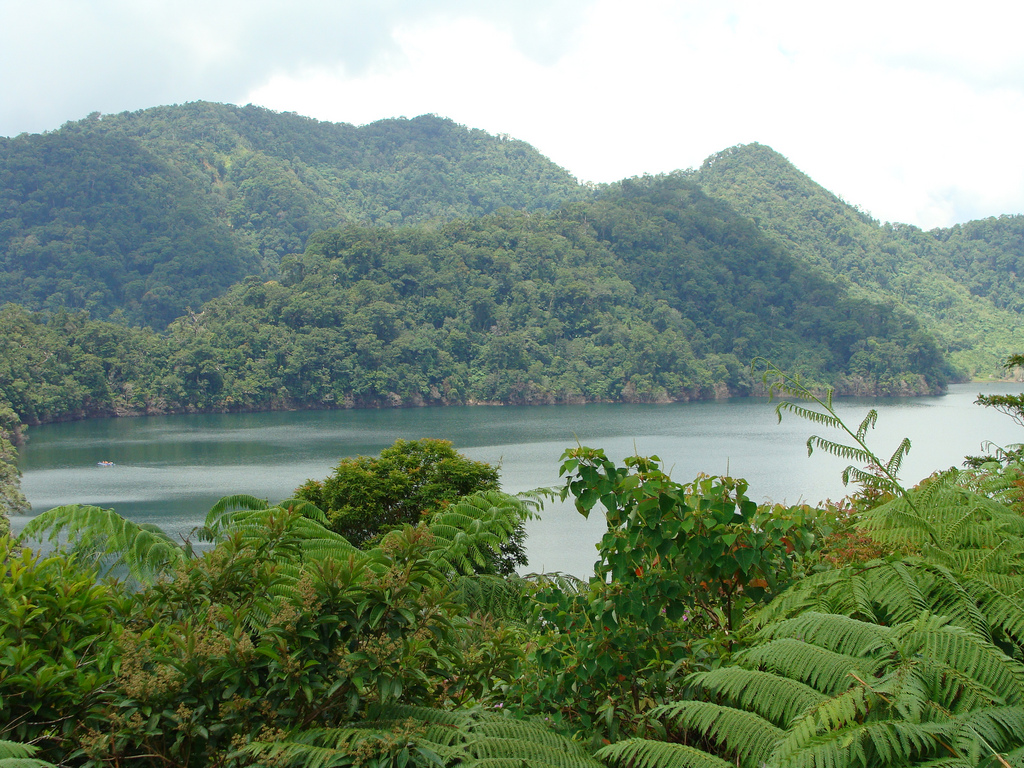
Lake Balinsasayao

The lakes are situated northwest of a narrow mountain ridge, in a caldera formed by four mountains: Mount Mahungot to the south, Mount Kalbasan to the north, Mount Balinsasayao to the east and Guintabon Dome to the west. A normal fault separates Lakes Balinsasayao and Danao while and another fault, the Amlan, is about 1,400 metres (4,600 ft) west of Danao. Four geologic faults also intersect the southern edge of Lake Danao, whose water level is lower than that of Balinsasayao.

== Flora and fauna ==
As a protected natural park home to an expansive ecosystem and biodiversity, Balinsasayao Twin Lakes National Park is one of the major tourist attractions in Negros Oriental. The lake has a rich fish fauna and the surrounding dipterocarp forests are rich in bird life. However, invasive fish species such as tilapia, common carp, mudfish, shrimp, mosquito fish and milkfish have been introduced in the lake.

== Tourism ==
The Department of Environment and Natural Resources (DENR) through the Biodiversity Management Bureau (BMB) manages tourist activities in the natural park. The bureau allows, sightseeing, mountain trekking, camping, birdwatching, paddle boating in Lake Balinsasayao. The natural park has a concrete view deck, umbrella cottages, a restaurant, a souvenir shop, restrooms, and a visitor center.

== Conservation ==
Conserving the natural park's flora and fauna is a continuing struggle as surrounding forests are exploited for timber and charcoal production. The uncontrolled cutting of timber by slash-and-burn farmers or kaingineros is reducing the inflow of water to the lakes and causing a fall in water levels. Also, since the lakes are situated near Energy Development Corporation (EDC)'s Southern Negros Geothermal Field in Valencia, the forest surrounding the lakes are under threat from constant geothermal drilling. A co-management plan for geothermal preservation has been drafted by the DENR-PENRO, EDC, and the local governments of Valencia and Sibulan.

== See also ==
- Lakes of the Philippines
