= Lake Danao (Negros) =

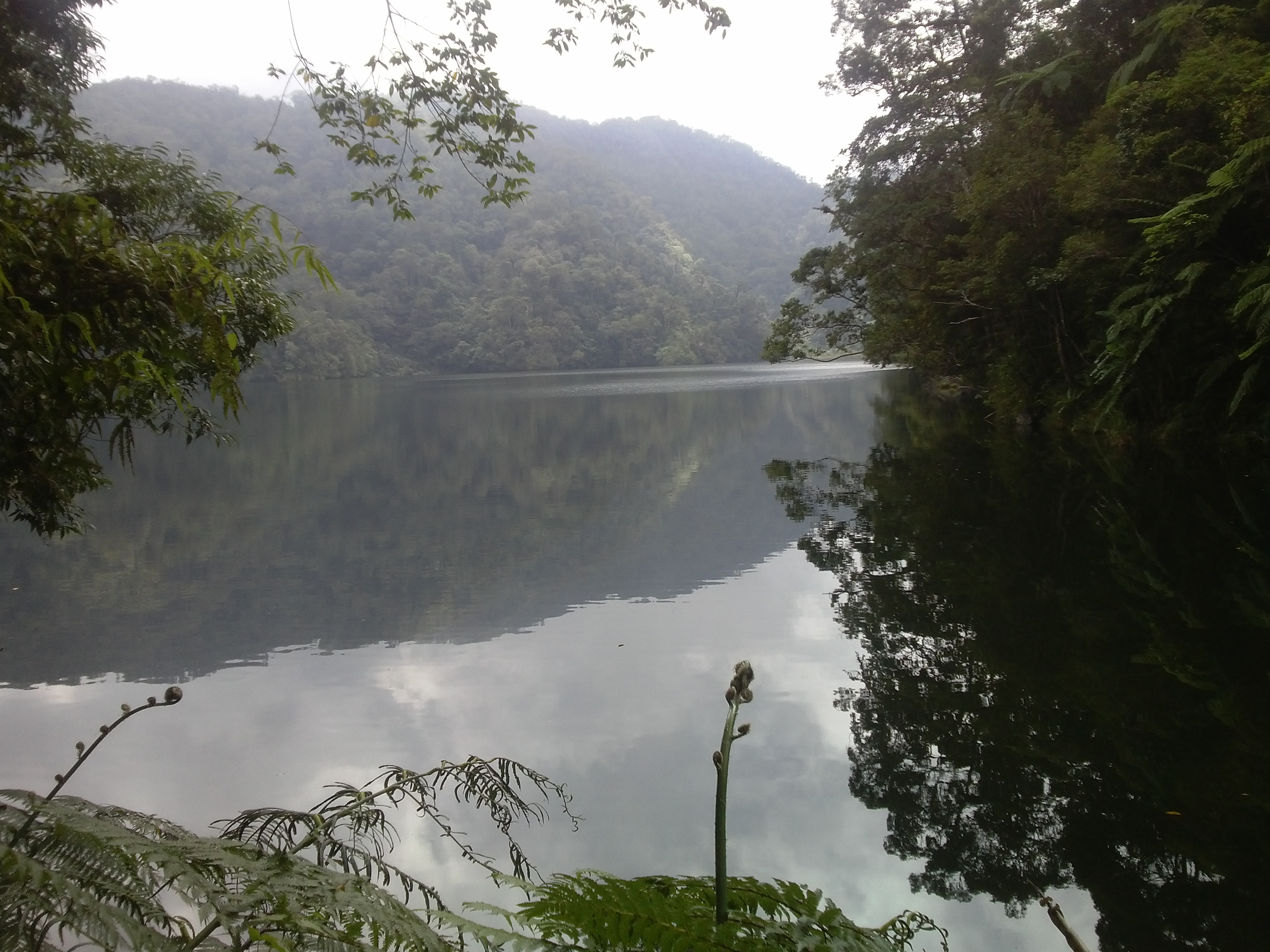

- Location within the Philippines
- Location: Negros Oriental
- Coordinates: 9°21′00″N 123°11′00″E
- Type: crater lake
- Basin countries: Philippines
- Surface area: 28 hectares (69 acres)
- Surface elevation: 898 metres (2,946 ft)

Lake Danao is the smaller of the two lakes located in the Balinsasayao Twin Lakes Natural Park in the southern part of Negros Oriental in the Philippines; the other being Lake Balinsasayao. The lakes and its surrounding were designated as a protected area by Proclamation No. 414 on 21 November 2000 categorized as a Natural Park covering about 8,016 hectares (19,810 acres). The lake itself has about 28 hectares (69 acres) surface area.

== Flora and fauna ==
The lake supports a rich fish fauna, including a number of introduced species. The surrounding dipterocarp forest is rich in bird life.
