= San Jose, Negros Oriental =

Municipality in Negros Oriental, Philippines

San Jose
- Municipality
- Municipality of San Jose
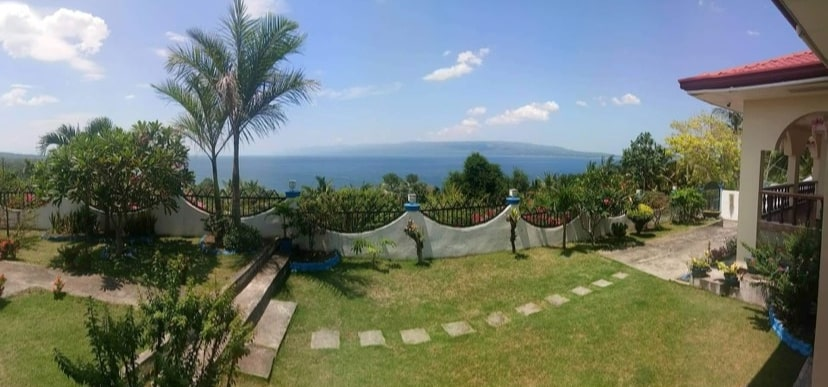
- Overlooking view of Tañon Strait from San Jose

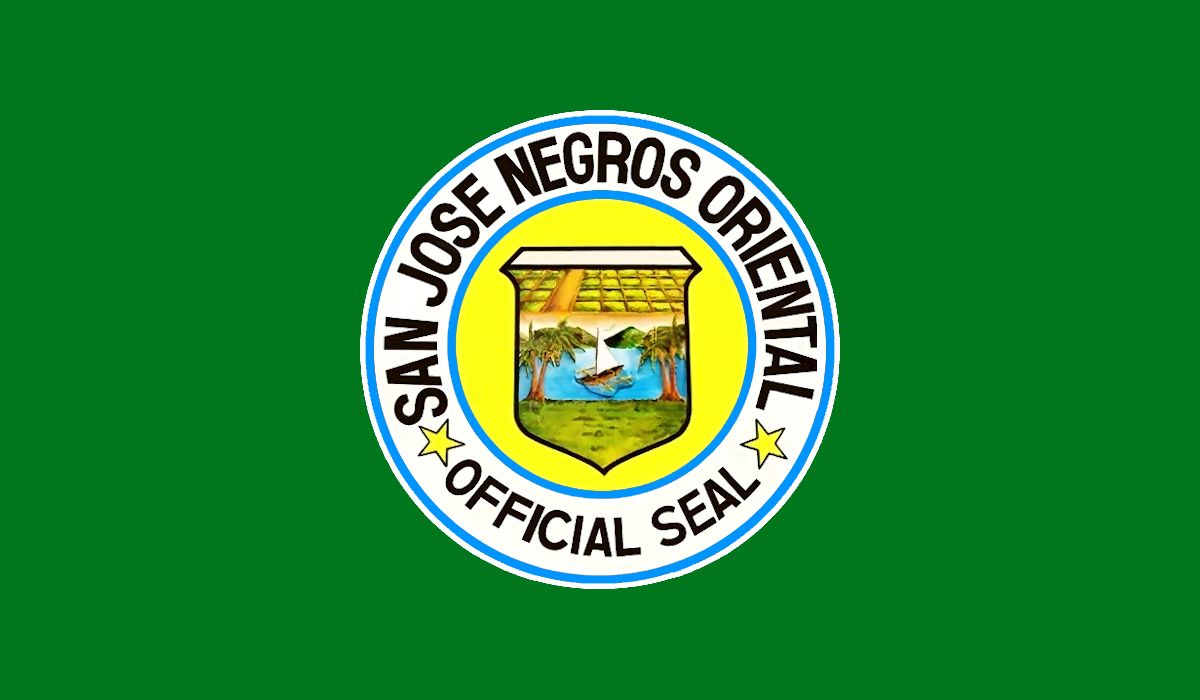
- Flag Seal
- Nickname: The Regional Pineapple Capital
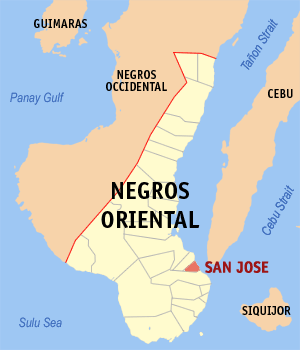
- Map of Negros Oriental with San Jose highlighted
- Interactive map of San Jose
- Location within the Philippines
- Coordinates: 9°25′N 123°14′E
- Country: Philippines
- Region: Negros Island Region
- Province: Negros Oriental
- District: 2nd district
- Founded: 1954
- Barangays: 14 (see Barangays)

Government
  - Type: Sangguniang Bayan
  - Mayor: Mel Nick S. Logronio (NP)
  - Vice Mayor: Quirino R. Renacia (NP)
  - Representative: Maisa Sagarbarria (Lakas)
  - Municipal Council: Members: Sheila B. Ruiz; Mea Rio-Macalino; Mercedita S. Uy; Joshua Luke Eusevere T. Siglos; Cresenciano Q. Joseph, Jr.; Emelia M. Bacay; Mildred D. Remoticado; Vincent A. Rubia
  - Electorate: 16,693 voters (2025)

Area
  - Total: 54.46 km^{2} (21.03 sq mi)
- Elevation: 99 m (325 ft)
- Highest elevation: 728 m (2,388 ft)
- Lowest elevation: 0 m (0 ft)

Population (2024 census)
  - Total: 22,870
  - Density: 419.9/km^{2} (1,088/sq mi)
  - Households: 5,389

Economy
  - Income class: 4th municipal income class
  - Poverty incidence: 22.22% (2023)
  - Revenue: ₱ 135.4 million (2024)
  - Assets: ₱ 380.6 million (2024)
  - Expenditure: ₱ 78.48 million (2024)
  - Liabilities: ₱ 150.4 million (2024)

Service provider
  - Electricity: Negros Oriental 2 Electric Cooperative (NORECO 2)
- Time zone: UTC+8 (PST)
- ZIP code: 6202
- PSGC: 074617000
- IDD : area code: +63 (0)35
- Native languages: Cebuano; Tagalog

San Jose (Cebuano: Lungsod sa San Jose; Tagalog: Bayan ng San Jose), officially the Municipality of San Jose, is a municipality in the province of Negros Oriental, Philippines. According to the 2024 census, it has a population of 22,870 people. It is the least populous town in Negros Oriental.

== History ==
The municipality of San Jose was formerly called "Ayuquitan", a name that was born due to a communication problem between the natives and Spanish Conquistadors. The story was that one day a group of Spaniards searching for flourishing communities came upon a group of natives harvesting rice. The Spaniards approached the natives and asked the name of the place while pointing to the ground filled with piles of rice chaffs. The natives thought they were asked for the name of the pile and answered "Inoquitan". From then on, the Spaniards called the place "Inoquitan". In time, the name "Ayuquitan" was adapted from the phrase "may inoquitan". In 1902 Governor Demetrio Larena considered the place as a pueblo. Pioneer Spanish Merchant is Manuel Pastor. San Jose is the home of the old Spanish families settled since 1871 like the Patero, Amiscaray, Larena, Pareja, Siglos, Remollo, Renacia, Remata, Araco, Tatel and Remoto.

San Jose was created as a town in 1954 from the barrios of Ayuquitan, Basak, Basiao, Cambaloctot, Calo, Cancawas, Hanay-Hanay, Jilocon, Lalaan, Naiba, Tapon Norte, Tampi, and sitios Guinsayawan, Kang-atid, Kangdajonog, Guilongsoran and Kaputihanan of the barrio of Siapo, all of which formerly belonged to the former municipality of Ayuquitan and then part of the municipality of Amlan.

== Geography ==
San Jose is 14 kilometres (8.7 mi) from Dumaguete and 201 kilometres (125 mi) from Bacolod.

=== Barangays ===
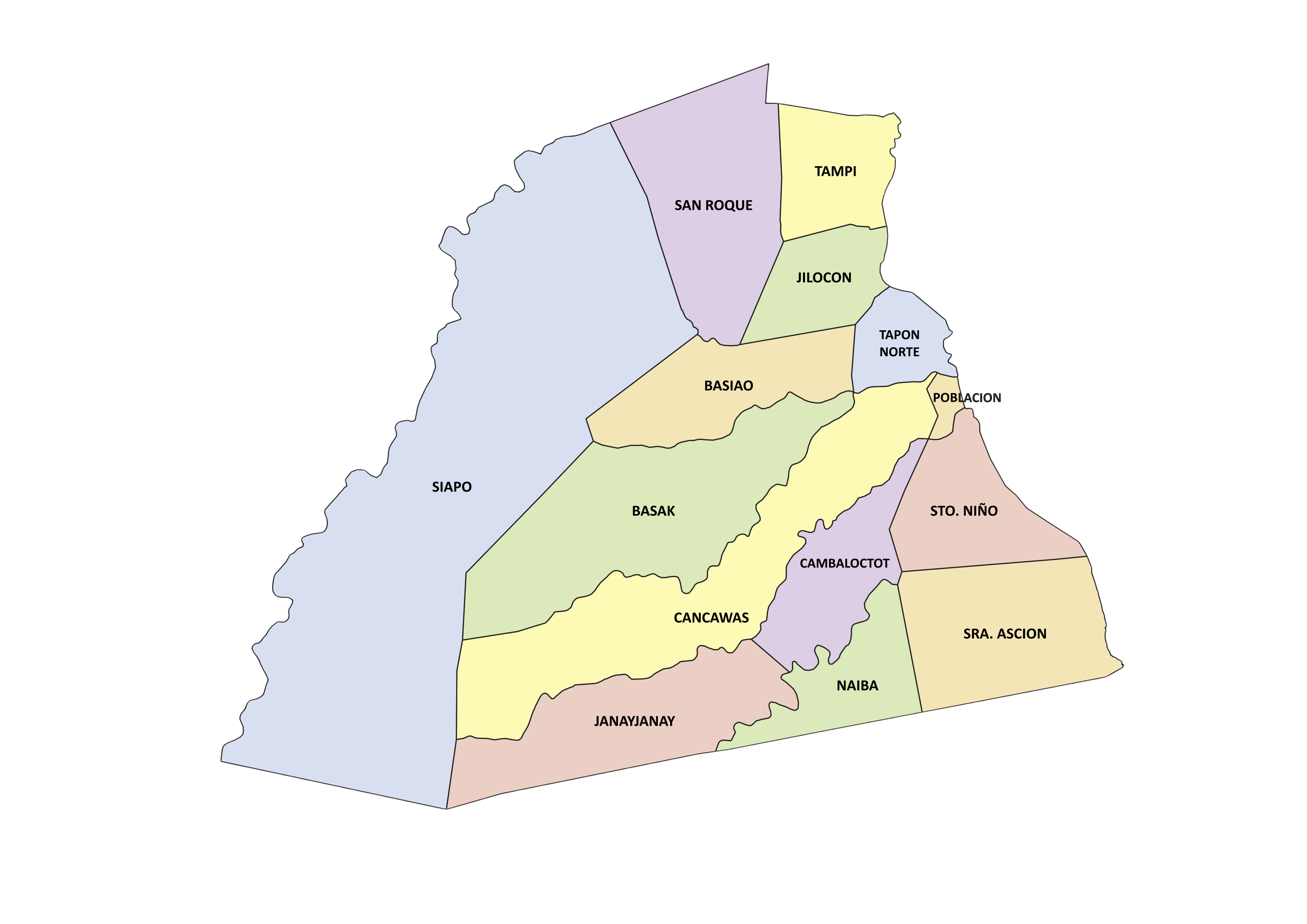
Political map of San Jose

San Jose is politically subdivided into 14 barangays. Each barangay consists of puroks and some have sitios.

PSGC	Barangay	Population			±% p.a.	
		2024		2010		
074617001	Basak	3.8%	870	888	▾	−0.14%
074617002	Basiao	3.0%	693	596	▴	1.05%
074617004	Cambaloctot	3.0%	693	557	▴	1.53%
074617005	Cancawas	7.7%	1,758	1,527	▴	0.98%
074617006	Janayjanay	4.8%	1,089	933	▴	1.08%
074617007	Jilocon	8.8%	2,004	1,728	▴	1.03%
074617008	Naiba	4.5%	1,040	671	▴	3.09%
074617009	Poblacion	4.0%	915	1,035	▾	−0.85%
074617010	San Roque	3.7%	853	816	▴	0.31%
074617011	Santo Niño	11.0%	2,509	2,195	▴	0.93%
074617012	Señora Ascion (Calo)	8.7%	1,980	1,690	▴	1.11%
074617013	Siapo	10.3%	2,357	2,136	▴	0.69%
074617014	Tampi	9.9%	2,260	1,837	▴	1.45%
074617015	Tapon Norte	12.8%	2,935	2,489	▴	1.15%
	Total		22,870	19,098	▴	1.26%

=== Climate ===
Climate data for San Jose, Negros Oriental
Month	Jan	Feb	Mar	Apr	May	Jun	Jul	Aug	Sep	Oct	Nov	Dec	Year
Mean daily maximum °C (°F)	28 (82)	30 (86)	31 (88)	32 (90)	32 (90)	30 (86)	30 (86)	30 (86)	30 (86)	29 (84)	30 (86)	30 (86)	30 (86)
Mean daily minimum °C (°F)	21 (70)	22 (72)	22 (72)	23 (73)	24 (75)	25 (77)	24 (75)	24 (75)	24 (75)	24 (75)	23 (73)	21 (70)	23 (74)
Average precipitation mm (inches)	26 (1.0)	22 (0.9)	28 (1.1)	41 (1.6)	95 (3.7)	136 (5.4)	147 (5.8)	126 (5.0)	132 (5.2)	150 (5.9)	98 (3.9)	46 (1.8)	1,047 (41.3)
Average rainy days	7.5	6.7	8.9	10.4	21.6	25.6	26.3	25.0	24.1	26.2	19.2	12.1	213.6
Source: Meteoblue

== Demographics ==
Population census of San Jose
Year	Pop.	±% p.a.
1960	7,547	—
1970	8,840	+1.59%
1975	9,517	+1.49%
1980	10,938	+2.82%
1990	12,821	+1.60%
1995	14,952	+2.92%
2000	15,665	+1.00%
2007	17,250	+1.34%
2010	19,098	+3.77%
2015	20,413	+1.28%
2020	21,956	+1.55%
2024	22,870	+0.98%
Source: Philippine Statistics Authority

== Economy ==
Poverty incidence of San Jose (%)

Source: Philippine Statistics Authority

== Education ==
The public schools in the town of San Jose are administered by one school district under the Schools Division of Negros Oriental.

Elementary schools:

- Alicia C. Calumpang Elementary School — Naiba
- Basak Elementary School — Basak
- Cancawas Elementary School — Cancawas
- Crisostomo O. Retes Elementary School (formerly Tampi ES) — Tampi
- Guilongsoran Primary School — Sitio Guilongsoran, Siapo
- Janayjanay Elementary School — Janayjanay
- Jose R. Remollo Elementary School — Cambaloctot
- Pedro A. Remoto Elementary School — Jilocon
- San Jose Central Elementary School — Nat'l Highway, Poblacion
- San Roque Elementary School — San Roque
- Siapo Elementary School — Siapo
- Sra. Ascion Elementary School (formerly Calo ES) — Sra. Ascion
- Tapon Norte Elementary School — Tapon Norte

High schools:

- Cambaloctot High School — Cambaloctot
- Crisostomo O. Retes National High School (formerly Tampi NHS) — Tampi
- San Jose Provincial High School — Poblacion
- Siapo High School — Siapo

== Tourism ==
The town is the gateway to the Balinsasayao Twin Lakes Natural Park in Enrique Villanueva, Sibulan Town.

One of the tourist attraction of the town was the Our Lady of Lourdes Shrine in the cane fields of Sto. Niño, where a spinning sun is said to have manifested the visit of the Lady of Lourdes, devotees flock every Saturday of the month.

The Ayuquitan Festival is held every May 7, one of the highlights of the town fiesta which is celebrated on May 10. Street dancing and showdown are the main features of the festival.

The St. Paul University Farm is located in Barangay Sra. Acion.

The Port of Tampi also serves RORO services going to the island of Cebu through the Port of Bato in the municipality of Samboan.
