= Valencia, Negros Oriental =

Municipality in Negros Oriental, Philippines

Valencia
- Municipality
- Municipality of Valencia
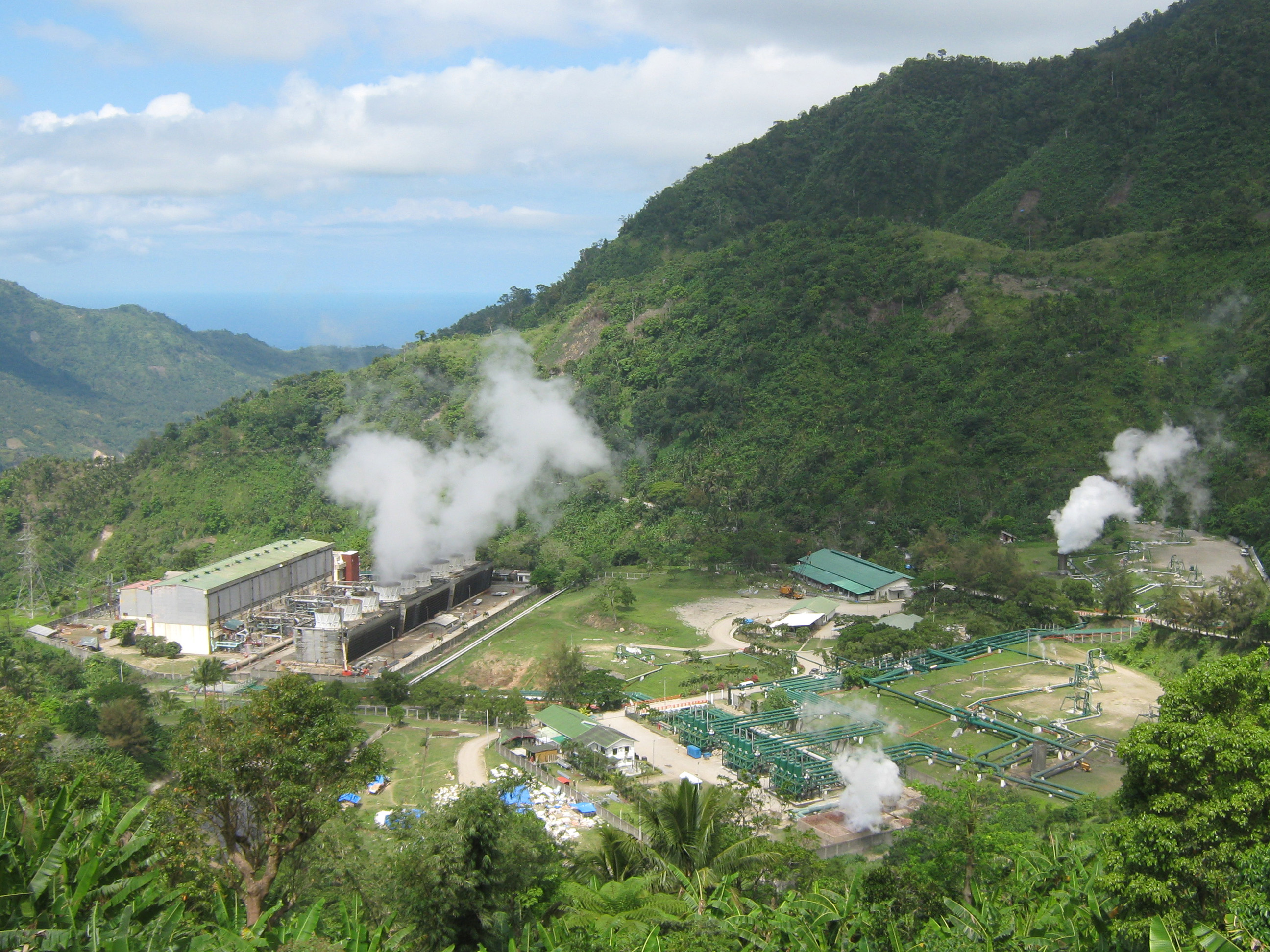
- Palinpinon Geothermal Power Plant in Barangay Puhagan

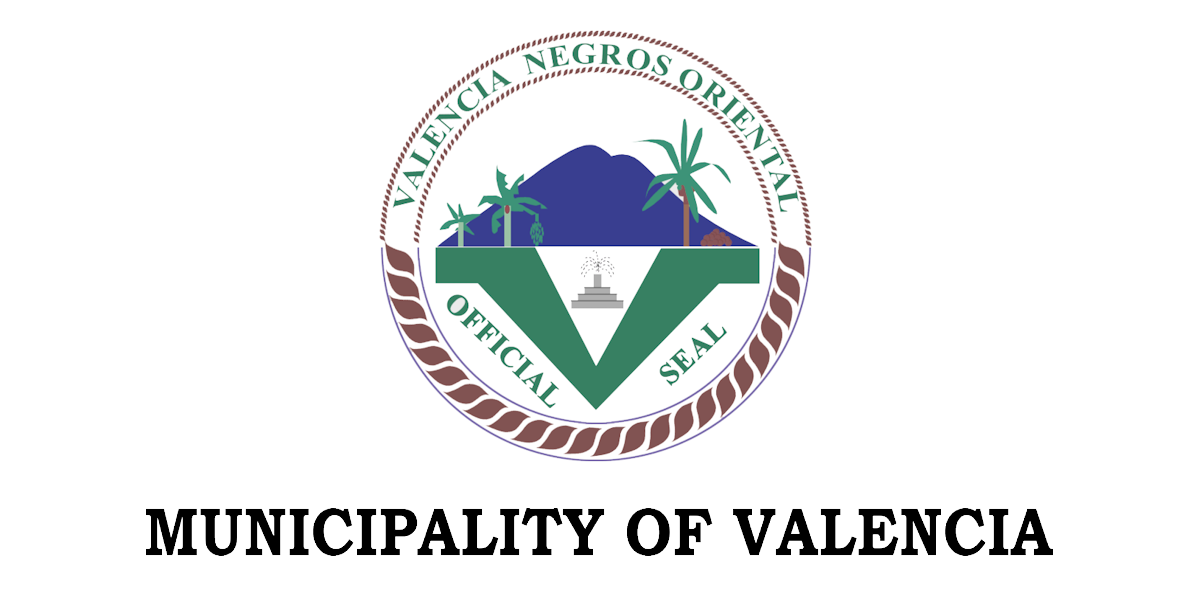
- Flag Seal

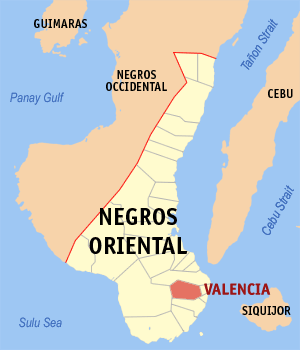
- Map of Negros Oriental with Valencia highlighted
- Interactive map of Valencia
- Location within the Philippines
- Coordinates: 9°17′N 123°15′E
- Country: Philippines
- Region: Negros Island Region
- Province: Negros Oriental
- District: 3rd district
- Barangays: 24 (see Barangays)

Government
  - Type: Sangguniang Bayan
  - Mayor: Edgar Z. Teves Jr.
  - Vice Mayor: Juna May T. Teves (NPC)
  - Representative: Janice Degamo (Lakas)
  - Municipal Council: Members: Loe A. Salvoro; Romeo T. Alviola; Elsie A. Dagoy; Oliver G. Igsie; Jane C. Albina; Marilie S. Maturan; Dioscoro T. Benedico; Edmund F. Dy; Shaquille T. Teves ^{‡}; Alyannah Shane V. Anque ^{◌}; ‡ ex officio ABC president; ◌ ex officio SK chairman
  - Electorate: 27,828 voters (2025)

Area
  - Total: 147.49 km^{2} (56.95 sq mi)
- Elevation: 275 m (902 ft)
- Highest elevation: 1,276 m (4,186 ft)
- Lowest elevation: 21 m (69 ft)

Population (2024 census)
  - Total: 39,986
  - Density: 271.11/km^{2} (702.17/sq mi)
  - Households: 9,255

Economy
  - Income class: 1st municipal income class
  - Poverty incidence: 16.54% (2023)
  - Revenue: ₱ 325.4 million (2024)
  - Assets: ₱ 2,087 million (2024)
  - Expenditure: ₱ 152.2 million (2024)
  - Liabilities: ₱ 1,104 million (2024)

Service provider
  - Electricity: Negros Oriental 2 Electric Cooperative (NORECO 2)
- Time zone: UTC+8 (PST)
- ZIP code: 6215
- PSGC: 074623000
- IDD : area code: +63 (0)35
- Native languages: Cebuano; Tagalog
- Named after: Valencia, Spain

Valencia, officially the Municipality of Valencia, is a municipality in the province of Negros Oriental, Philippines. According to the 2024 census, it has a population of 39,986 people.

The municipality was voted as "the greenest and cleanest" town of Negros Oriental in 2007.

Our Lady of the Abandoned is the patroness of Valencia, and her feast day is celebrated annually every October 12 with the town fiesta. The fiesta is an official non-working holiday for the town.

== History ==
Valencia was originally named Ermita, which means "a secluded place", due to its being a refuge from marauding Muslim pirates. In 1856, it was renamed Nueva Valencia by Spanish colonizers, in honor of its parish priest Father Matias Villamayor from Valencia, Spain. He also had a fountain brought over from his aforementioned hometown, which currently sits in front of the Town Hall.

In 1920, it was renamed Luzuriaga (often times misspelt as Luzurriaga) in honour of Don Carlos Ruíz de Luzuriaga, a delegate from Negros island to the Philippine Legislature who promised town officials he would work hard to help improve the town. The town reverted to Valencia in 1948, by virtue of Republic Act 252.

During World War II, Malabo was the headquarters of the Free Government and resistance movement in Negros Oriental.

== Geography ==
Valencia occupies an area of 14,749 hectares (36,450 acres), 35% of which are classified as plains. The town is 65% mountainous, with elevation averaging from 200 to 500 metres (660 to 1,640 ft) above sea level, with the top of Mount Talinis at an elevation of 1,903 metres (6,243 ft) along the municipal southern boundary. The climate in the municipality is relatively cool, especially at higher elevations.

Valencia is 10 kilometres (6.2 mi) west of provincial capital Dumaguete and 7 kilometres (4.3 mi) from Bacong.

The region is also the most critical watershed area of Negros Oriental, providing abundant drinking water to Valencia and its neighboring municipalities.

=== Barangays ===
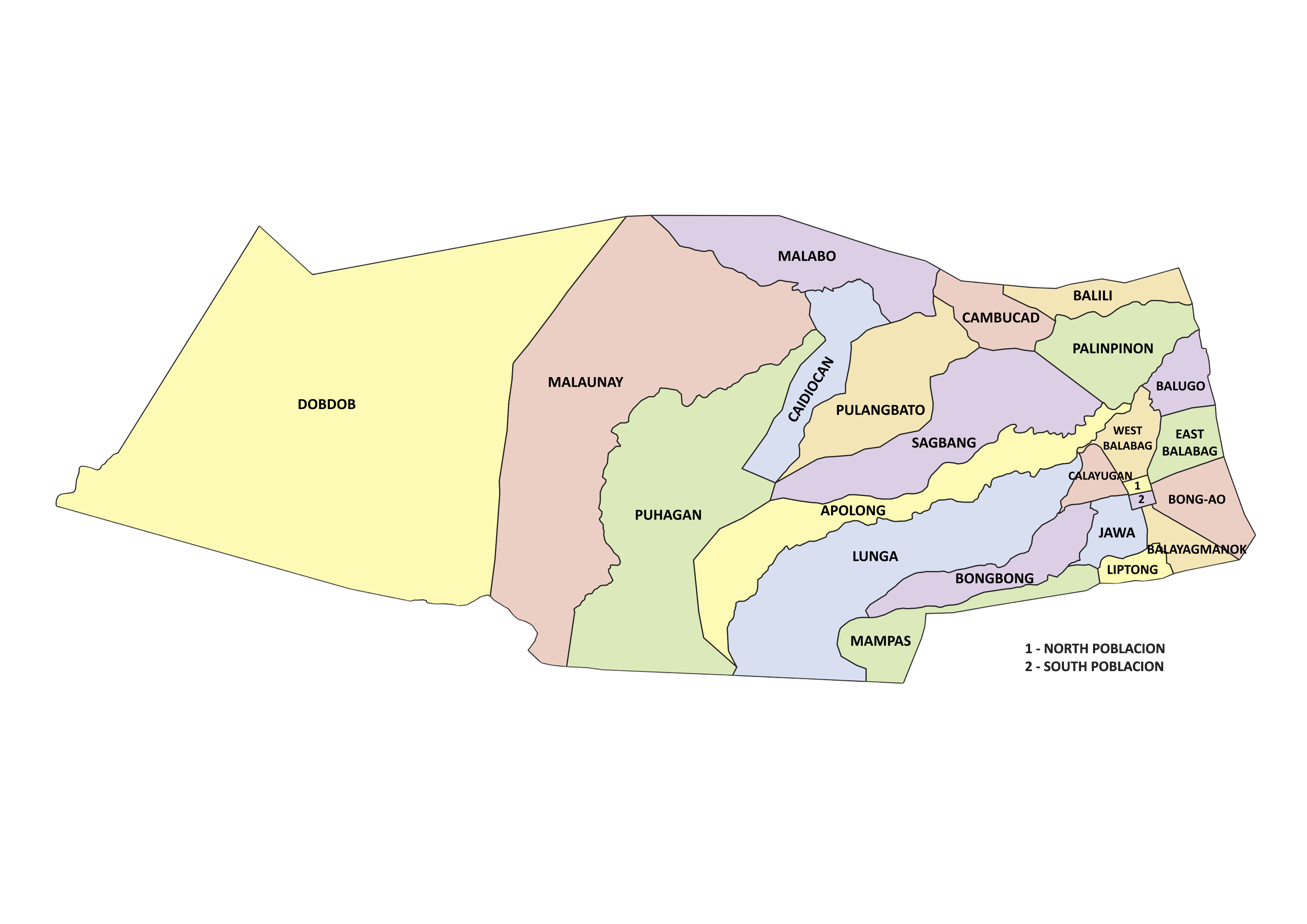
Political map of Valencia

Valencia is politically subdivided into 24 barangays. Each barangay consists of puroks and some have sitios.

PSGC	Barangay	Population			±% p.a.	
		2024		2010		
074623001	Apolong	4.3%	1,732	1,496	▴	1.02%
074623004	Balayagmanok	3.7%	1,472	1,106	▴	2.00%
074623005	Balili	1.5%	607	487	▴	1.54%
074623006	Balugo	5.6%	2,222	1,649	▴	2.09%
074623007	Bongbong	3.8%	1,527	1,333	▴	0.95%
074623008	Bong-ao	8.1%	3,228	2,226	▴	2.61%
074623013	Caidiocan	4.1%	1,620	1,536	▴	0.37%
074623009	Calayugan	3.4%	1,362	1,114	▴	1.40%
074623010	Cambucad	1.5%	589	529	▴	0.75%
074623011	Dobdob	3.7%	1,475	1,346	▴	0.64%
074623002	East Balabag	9.8%	3,916	2,662	▴	2.72%
074623012	Jawa	6.6%	2,639	1,964	▴	2.07%
074623014	Liptong	3.1%	1,224	1,094	▴	0.78%
074623015	Lunga	2.6%	1,044	885	▴	1.15%
074623016	Malabo	2.0%	799	823	▾	−0.21%
074623017	Malaunay	5.3%	2,136	1,950	▴	0.63%
074623018	Mampas	1.3%	513	413	▴	1.52%
074623019	Palinpinon	8.4%	3,352	2,447	▴	2.21%
074623020	North Poblacion	1.8%	738	752	▾	−0.13%
074623022	Puhagan	5.0%	1,986	1,548	▴	1.74%
074623023	Pulangbato	2.6%	1,031	989	▴	0.29%
074623024	Sagbang	2.2%	879	846	▴	0.27%
074623021	South Poblacion	1.4%	557	602	▾	−0.54%
074623003	West Balabag	5.2%	2,085	1,680	▴	1.51%
	Total		39,986	31,477	▴	1.67%

=== Climate ===
Climate data for Valencia, Negros Oriental
Month	Jan	Feb	Mar	Apr	May	Jun	Jul	Aug	Sep	Oct	Nov	Dec	Year
Mean daily maximum °C (°F)	28 (82)	29 (84)	30 (86)	31 (88)	30 (86)	29 (84)	29 (84)	29 (84)	29 (84)	28 (82)	28 (82)	28 (82)	29 (84)
Mean daily minimum °C (°F)	21 (70)	21 (70)	21 (70)	22 (72)	23 (73)	23 (73)	23 (73)	23 (73)	23 (73)	23 (73)	22 (72)	21 (70)	22 (72)
Average precipitation mm (inches)	26 (1.0)	22 (0.9)	28 (1.1)	41 (1.6)	95 (3.7)	136 (5.4)	147 (5.8)	126 (5.0)	132 (5.2)	150 (5.9)	98 (3.9)	46 (1.8)	1,047 (41.3)
Average rainy days	7.5	6.7	8.9	10.4	21.6	25.6	26.3	25.0	24.1	26.2	19.2	12.1	213.6
Source: Meteoblue (Use with caution: this is modeled/calculated data, not measured locally.)

== Demographics ==
Population census of Valencia
Year	Pop.	±% p.a.
1903	8,726	—
1918	8,825	+0.08%
1939	9,979	+0.59%
1948	7,059	−3.77%
1960	10,048	+2.99%
1970	13,318	+2.85%
1975	14,656	+1.94%
1980	14,645	−0.02%
1990	18,102	+2.14%
1995	20,147	+2.03%
2000	24,365	+4.16%
2007	27,933	+1.90%
2010	31,477	+4.44%
2015	34,852	+1.96%
2020	38,733	+2.25%
2024	39,986	+0.77%
Source: Philippine Statistics Authority

=== Languages ===
Cebuano is the common vernacular in Valencia. Tagalog and English are also widely spoken.

== Economy ==
Poverty incidence of Valencia (%)

Source: Philippine Statistics Authority

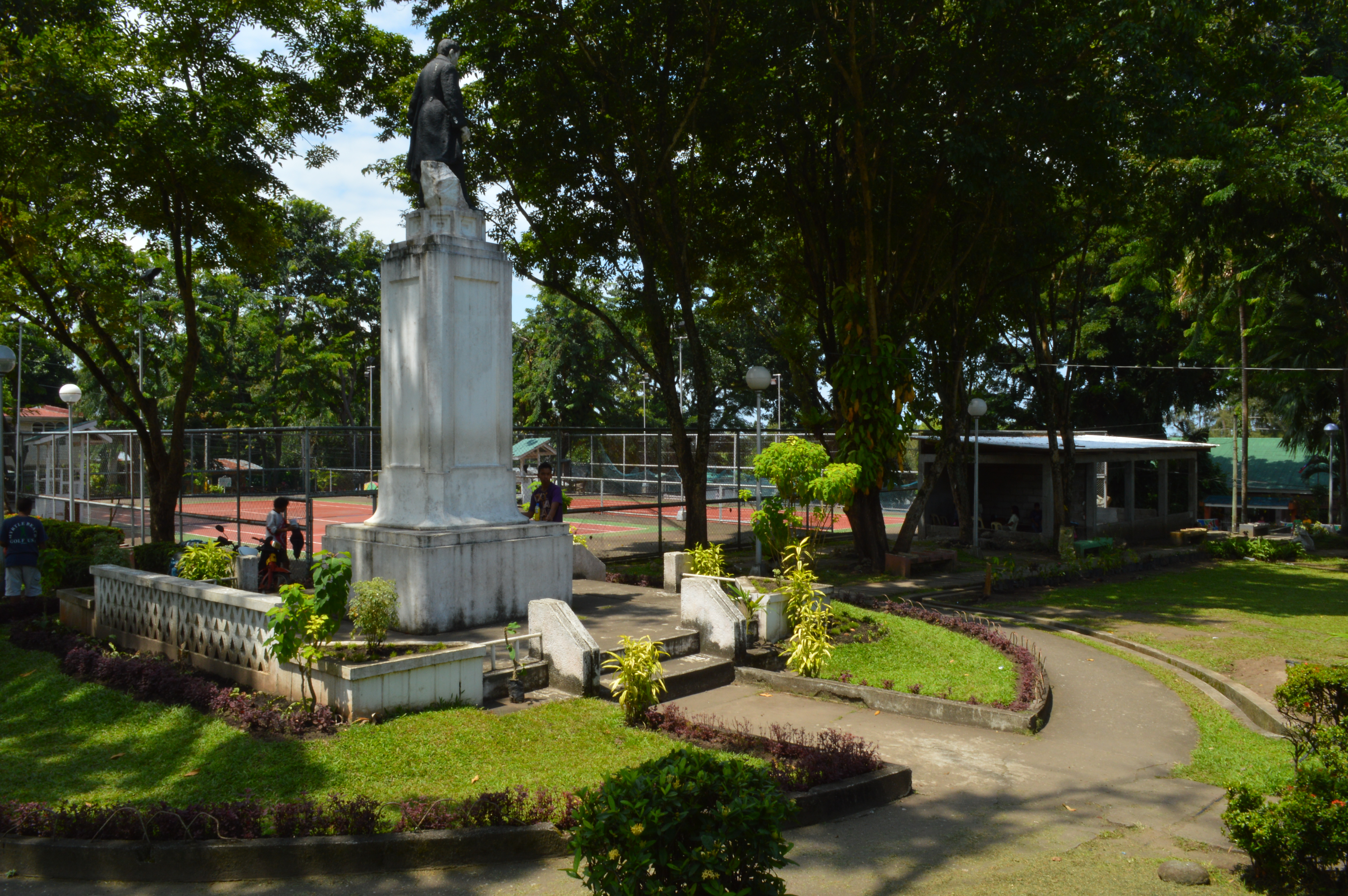
Valencia Industrial Park

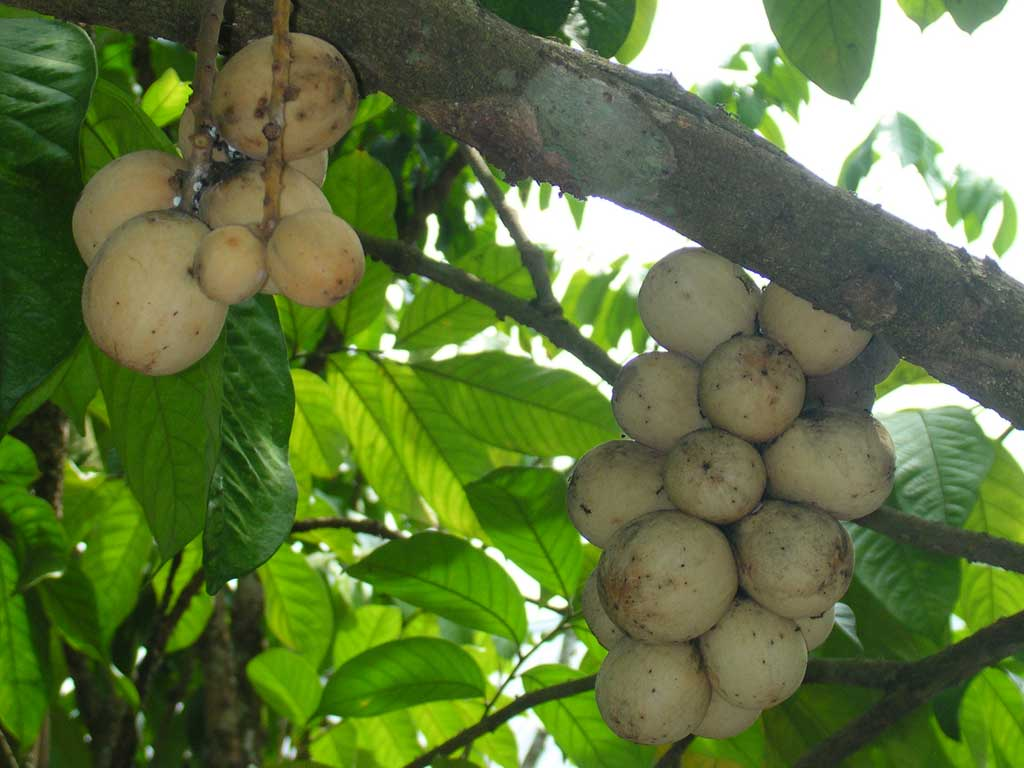
Lanzones fruits grown in Valencia are exported to other towns.

The economy of Valencia is largely based on agriculture. Major products include abaca, copra, corn, flowers, vegetables, root crops, and exotic fruits such as lanzones and rambutan.

The municipality is also the site of a geothermal power station operated by the Energy Development Corporation. It generates electricity that supplies the needs of Negros, Panay, and parts of Cebu. The municipal government receives royalties from the power station.

Valencia, specifically, has a 20-megawatt Palinpinon 2 Geothermal Optimization Project in Sitio Nasuji, Barangay Puhagan, 35 kilometers from Dumaguete. The ₱1.74-billion geothermal optimization (expansion) project, funded the Development Bank of the Philippines (DBP) is part of EDC's 192-MW Southern Negros Geothermal Production Field that supplies the power needs of 8 provinces in Negros, Panay, Guimaras and Cebu Islands. Valencia's 192-MW Palinpinon I and II geothermal field ranks 4th in installed capacity nationwide. The Palinpinon field contributed $457.8 million in 2004 foreign exchange savings for 2004, and also generated $267 million savings from January to July, 2008.

Because Palinpinon is such a big source of geothermal energy, Gloria Macapagal Arroyo said it received P 250 million in royalties, applied for livelihood, education, related projects, and also for the 50% subsidy on Valencia electric bills consumers. Many residents also work in the nearby city of Dumaguete.

== Tourism ==
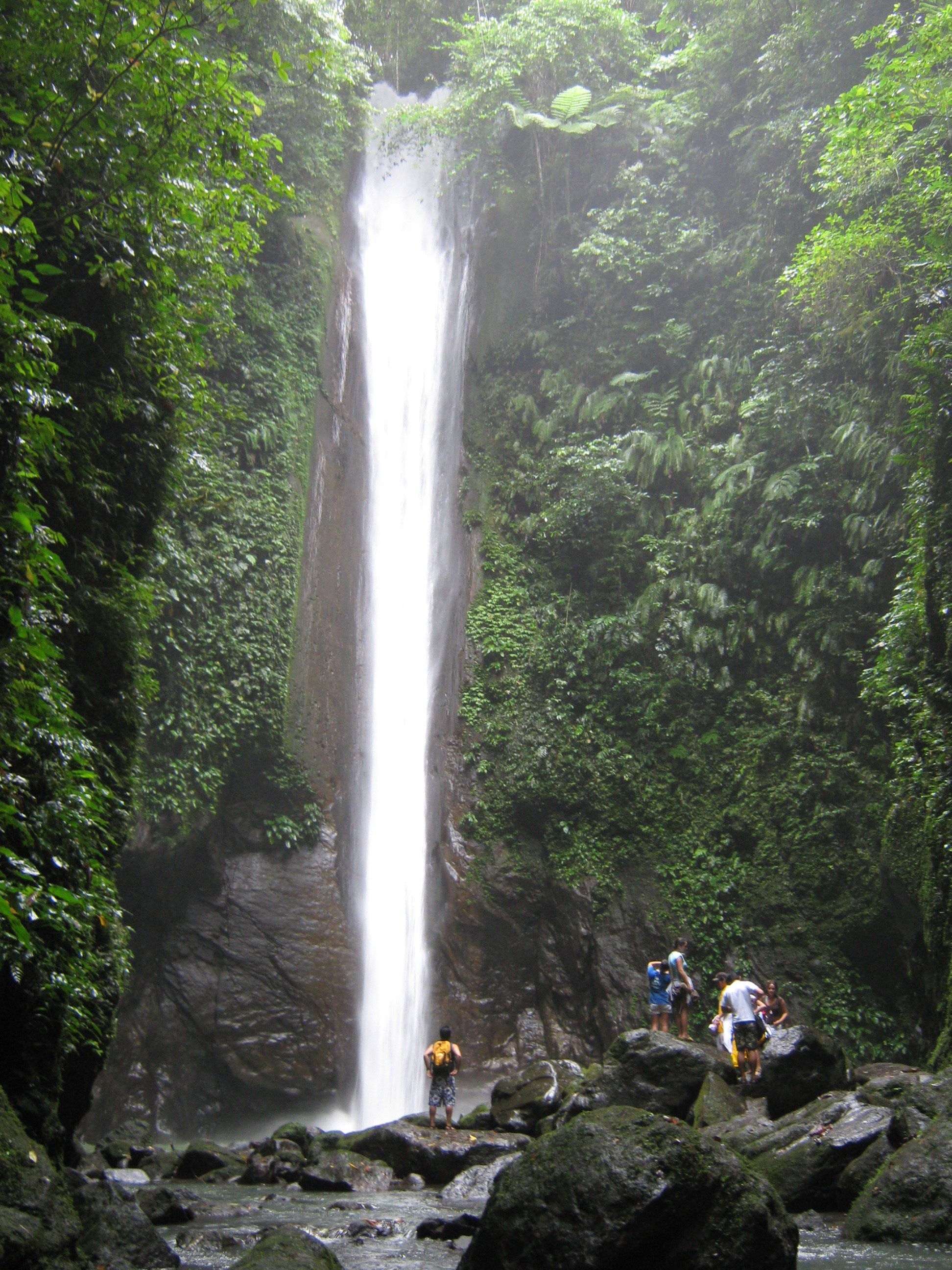
Casaroro Falls

The Filipino-Japanese Amity Memorial Shrine is located in Valencia. It stands at the foot of Mount Talinis and marks the spot where the combined Filipino and American troops including the Negrosanon guerrilla units fought the Japanese Imperial Army toward the end of World War II.

Eco-tourism sites include:

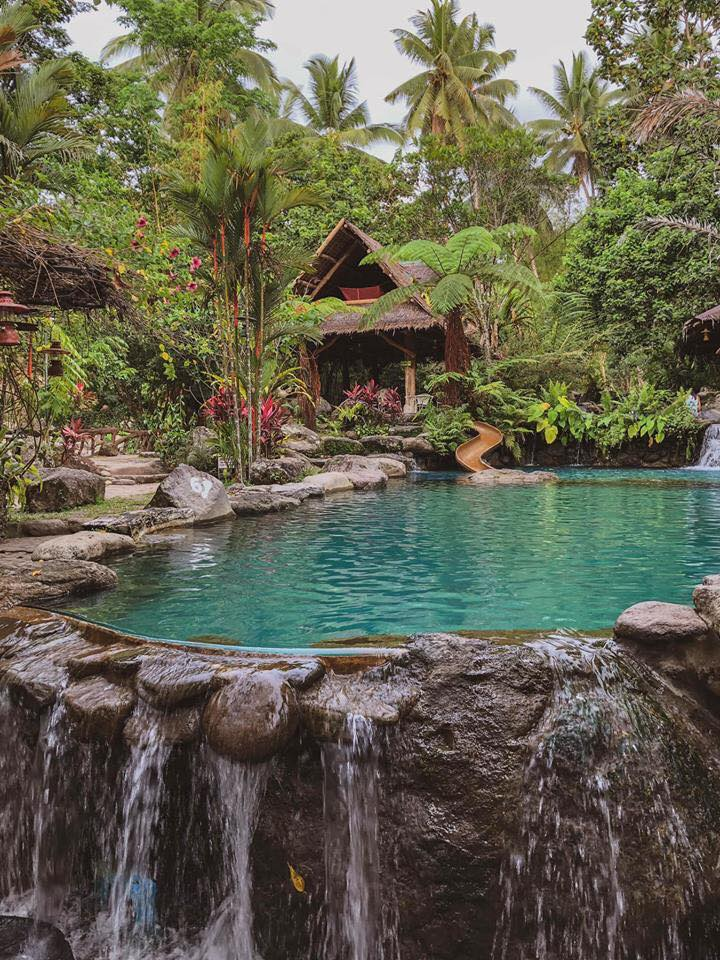
The Forest Camp Resort

- Tejero Highland Resort and Adventure Park - is the newest attraction in Central Philippines to offer the best value-for-your-money relaxation and recreation facility. It features a speed dual zipline, ATVs, segway, Aquazorb, slide, natural pools, restaurant and hotel. Located only 3 kilometers from town proper of Valencia, Tejero is the nearest natural attraction from Dumaguete, and considered the most popular of tourist destinations.
- Casaroro Waterfalls - as the province's most photographed body of water, it is relatively enclosed by lush greenery and natural rock formations. The falls' cool water gushes down to a swimming hole.
- The Forest Camp Resort - was first opened in 1990, as a 6,000 square meter property, today its 2.2 hectares of land is a vast camping ground, with 2 large nipa hut houses, 4 cottages, a tree house, a 250-people capacity conference/reception hall, a backpacker's den and a dormitory that can hold up to 20 students.
- The Spanish Fountain - a relic of the town's colorful historical past at the heart of the municipal plaza, has a unique sunken design, and was once the town's major source of water supply (invented by an Augustinian Recollect Friars to channel water from an upland spring).
- Cata-al War Memorabilia - a private collection by an 84-year-old World War II survivor Porforio Cata-al, at his residence cum museum. It includes bombs, grenades, Japanese and American bills, coins, medals, charred pieces of an authentic military uniform, and a Japanese soldier mummy
- Filipino-American-Japanese Amity Shrine - on a hilltop of Sagbang, this is a 3-sided pillar representing the 3 countries (Philippines, America and Japan), unveiled in 1977.
- Banica Swimming Lagoon - known as Tejeros resort, it has 2 man made pools fed by Banica River.
- Malabo/Pulangbato Falls - is a swimming and diving hole with many reddish rocks.
- Red Rock Hot Spring - dipping pool
- Mount Talinis - a 1,903-meter peak in the Cuernos de Negros which has a number of volcanic lakes and extensive biodiversity.
- Balinsasayao Twin Lakes Natural Park - a protected area near Mount Talinis surrounding two crater lakes.

== Education ==
The public schools in the town of Valencia are administered by one school district under the Schools Division of Negros Oriental.

Elementary schools:

- Badiang Elementary School — Sitio Badiang, Pulangbato
- Balabag Elementary School — East Balabag
- Balili Elementary School — Balili
- Balugo Elementary School — Balugo
- Bong-ao Elementary School — Bong-ao
- Bongbong Elementary School — Bongbong
- Caidiocan Elementary School — Caidiocan
- Calinawan Elementary School — Sitio Calinawan, Dobdob
- Dobdob Elementary School — Dobdob
- Dungga Primary School — Sitio Dungga, Malaunay
- Inas Elementary School — Sitio Inas, Dobdob
- Liptong Elementary School — Liptong
- Malabo Elementary School — Malabo
- Malaunay Elementary School — Malaunay
- Nasuji Elementary School — Sitio Nasuji, Puhagan
- Palinpinon Elementary School — Palinpinon
- Puhagan Elementary School — Puhagan
- Pulangbato Elementary School — Pulangbato
- Sagbang Elementary School — Sagbang
- Valencia Central Elementary School — Luna Street, North Poblacion
- Vicente I. Villa Memorial School — Apolong

High schools:

- Balugo National High School — Balugo
- Pulangbato National High School — Pulangbato
- Pulangbato National Senior High School — Palinpinon
- Valencia National High School — Bong-ao
- Valencia NHS - Dobdob Extension — Dobdob

Private schools:

- ABC Learning Center Valencia — Bong-ao
- Colegio de San Pedro-Recoletos (formerly San Pedro Academy) — Rizal Street, South Poblacion
- Dumaguete Kalikasan Educational Center, Inc. — Bong-ao
- Marymount Westridge School — Smith Street, South Poblacion
- San Pedro Academy-Recoletos — Caidiocan

== Government ==
=== List of chief executives ===
- Mariano Imbo (Captain)
- Gerardo Imbo (1916 - 1919)
- Eustaquio Vincoy (1919 - 1927)
- Guillermo Albina (1928 - 1931)
- Quiterio Mariño (1931 - 1939)
- Jose Villamil (1940 - 1946)
- Rodolfo Gonzalez, Senior (1946 - 1967)
- Elpidio Unto (1968 - 1971)
- Rodolfo Gonzalez, Senior (1972 - 1980)
- Saludario Sonjaco (1981 - 1986)
- Victor Naces (1986 - 1987)
- Jose Villamil (Officer in Charge) (1987 - 1988)
- Edgar Teves (1988 - 1998)
- Humberto Sy (1998 - 2001)
- Rodolfo Gonzalez, Junior (2001 – 2010)
- Enrique Gonzalez (2010 - 2013)
- Edgar Teves (2013–2022)
- Edgar Teves, Jr. (2022–present)
