= Negros Island Region =

Administrative region of the Philippines

- Region
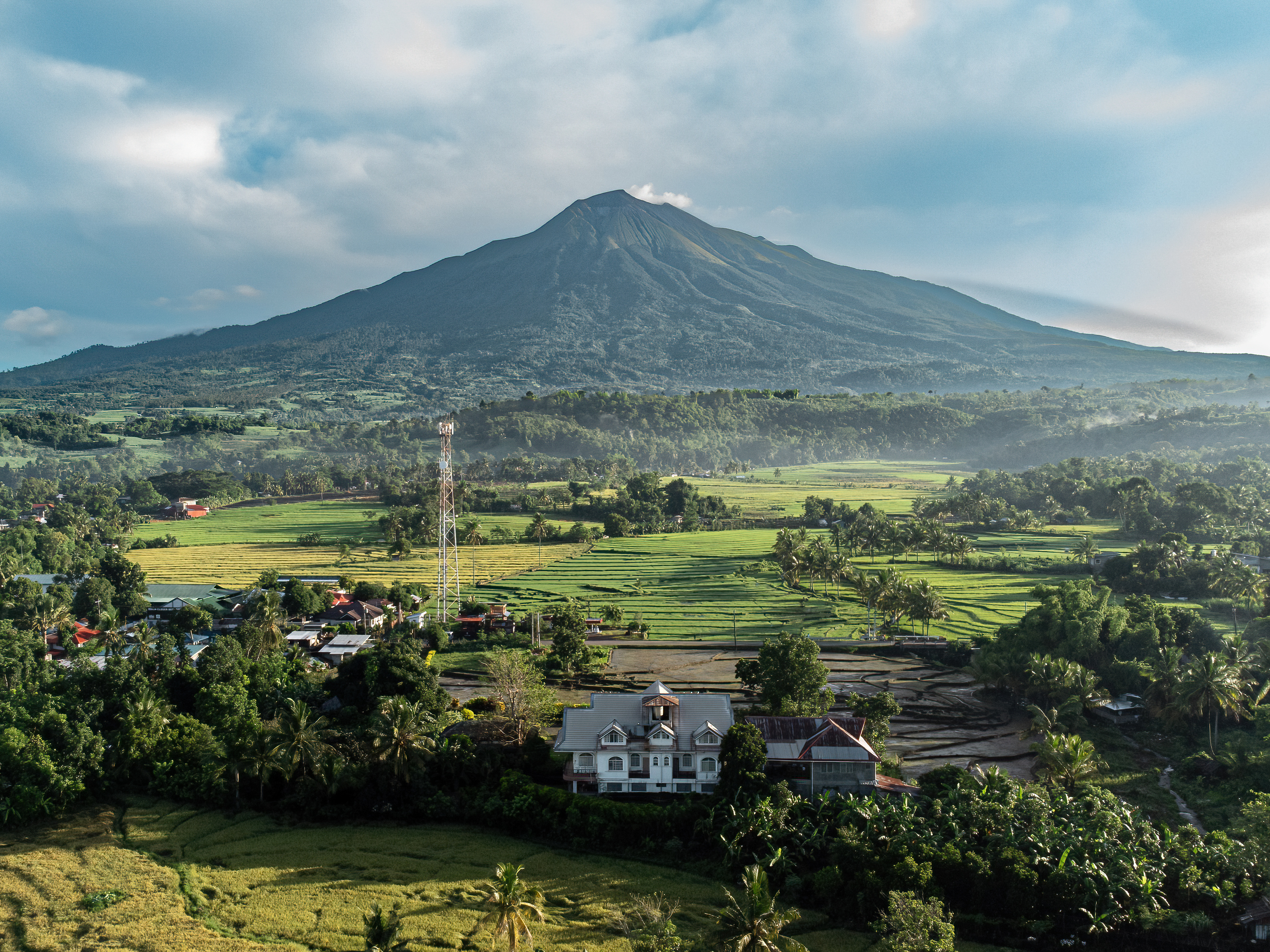
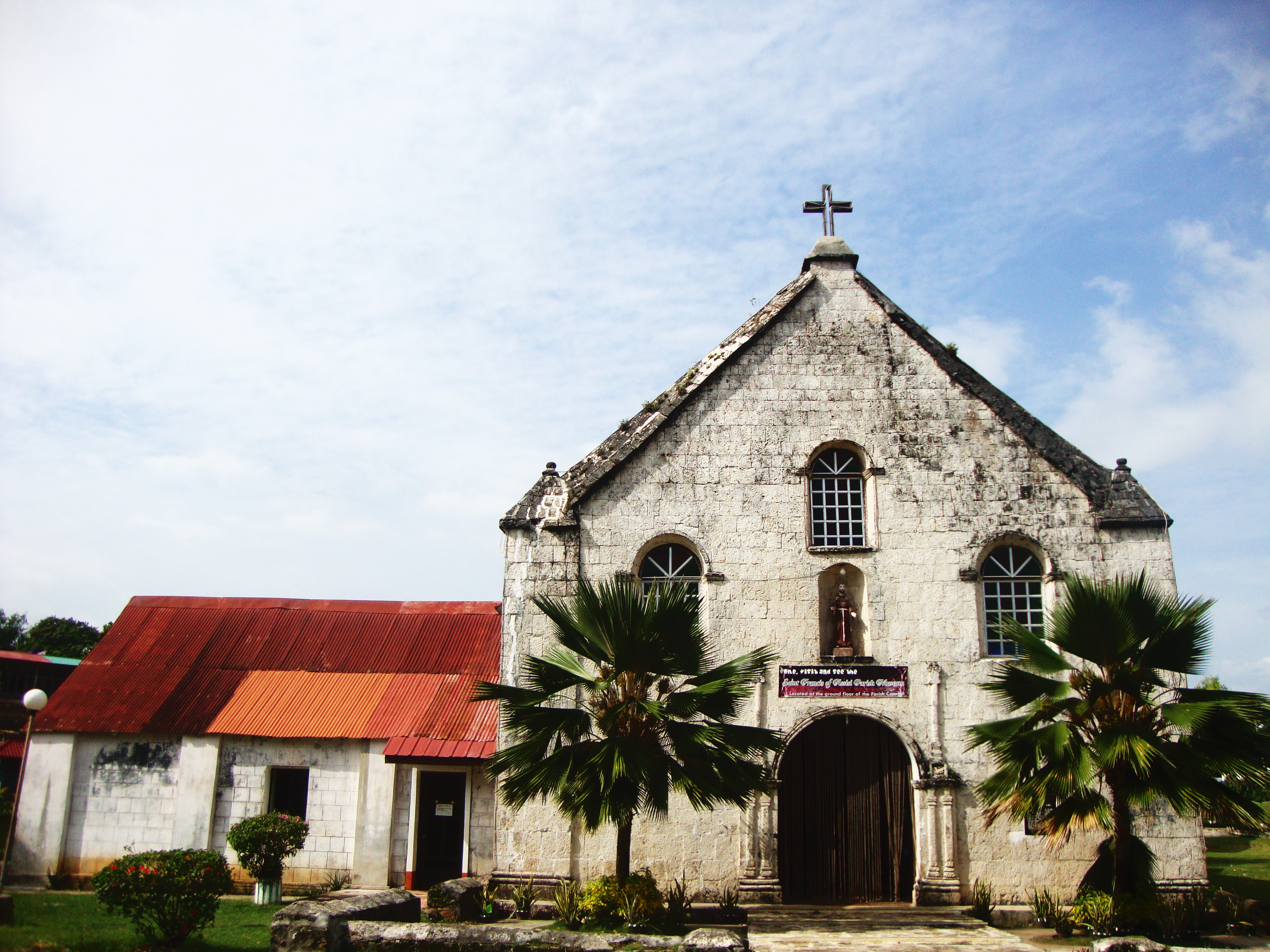
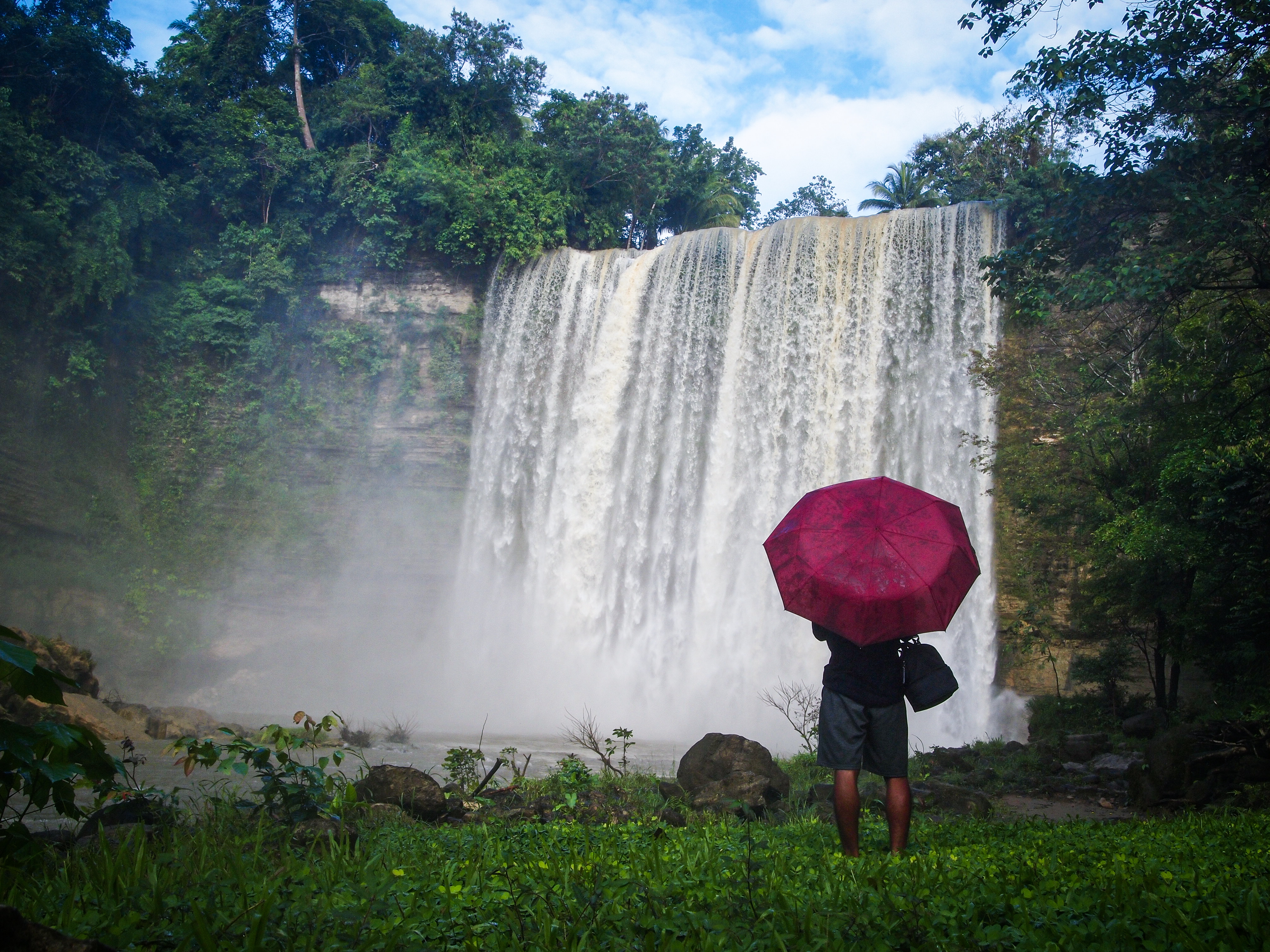
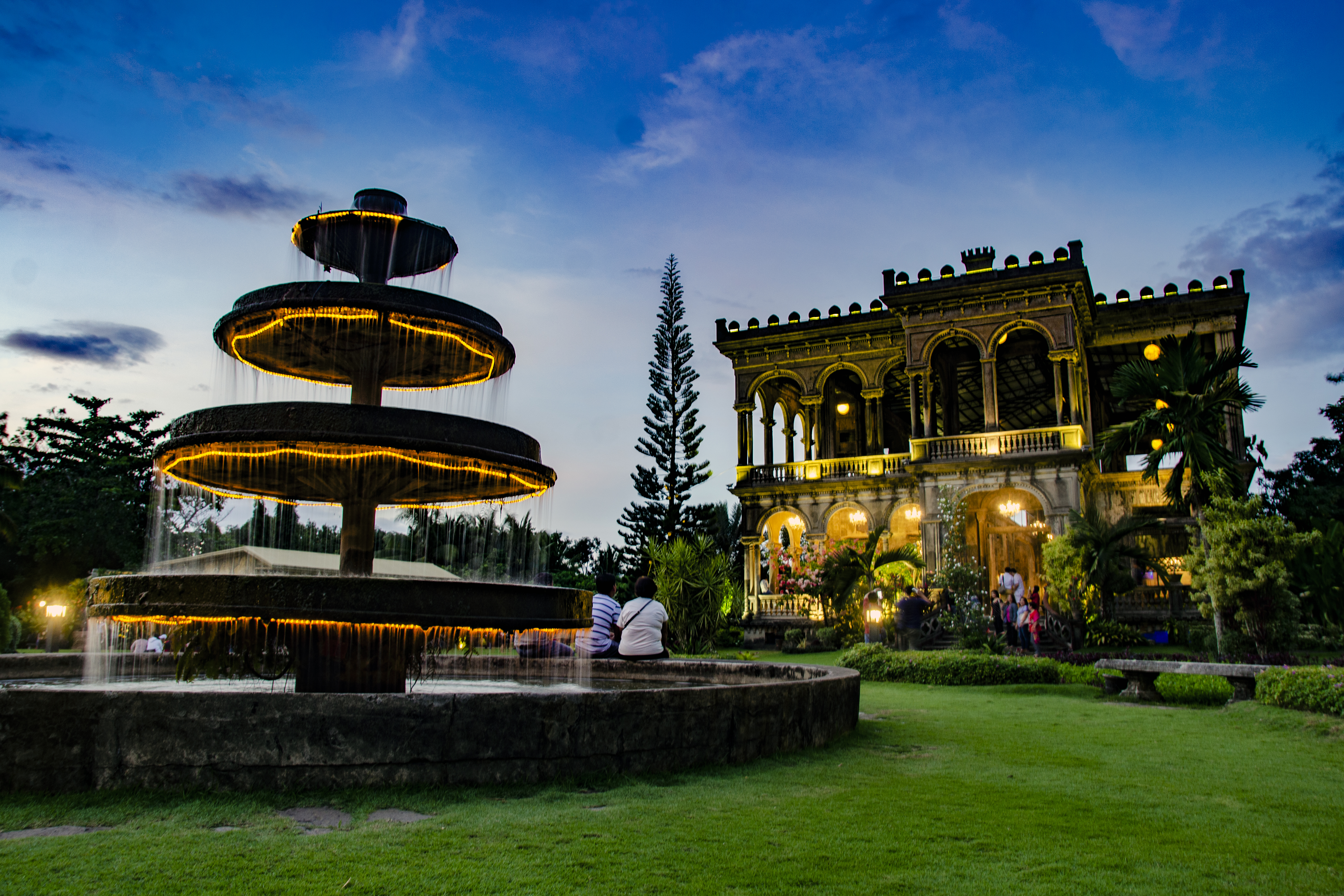
- Clockwise from the top: Kanlaon, St. Francis of Assisi Church (Siquijor), The Ruins, Niludhan Falls, Bacolod Government Center

- Location within the Philippines
- Interactive map of Negros Island Region
- Country: Philippines
- Island group: Visayas
- Establishment: May 29, 2015 (first); June 11, 2024 (second)
- Regional centers: Bacolod and Dumaguete
- Largest city: Bacolod

Area
  - Total: 13,525.56 km^{2} (5,222.25 sq mi)
- Highest elevation (Mount Kanlaon): 2,465 m (8,087 ft)

Population (2024 census)
  - Total: 4,904,944
  - Density: 362.6426/km^{2} (939.2400/sq mi)

Divisions
  - Provinces: List: Negros Occidental; Negros Oriental; Siquijor
  - Independent cities: 1: Bacolod
  - Component cities: 18: Bago; Bais; Bayawan; Cadiz; Canlaon; Dumaguete; Escalante; Guihulngan; Himamaylan; Kabankalan; La Carlota; Sagay; San Carlos; Silay; Sipalay; Talisay; Tanjay; Victorias
  - Municipalities: 44
  - Barangays: 1,353
  - Districts: 11

Economy
  - Poverty incidence: 14.3% (2025)
  - GDP total: US$14.8 billion (2025)
  - GDP per capita: US$2,924 (2025)
- Time zone: UTC+8 (PST)
- PSGC: 1800000000
- Electorate: 3,059,321 voters (2025)
- Languages: Hiligaynon; Cebuano; Magahat; Carolan; Tagalog; English

The Negros Island Region (NIR; Tagalog: Rehiyon ng Pulo ng Negros; Cebuano: Rehiyon sa Pulo sa Negros; Hiligaynon: Rehiyon sang Pulo sang Negros) is an administrative region in the Philippines. It includes the islands of Negros and Siquijor and comprises the provinces of Negros Occidental, Negros Oriental, and Siquijor, along with the highly urbanized city of Bacolod, the region's most populous city. The regional centers are Bacolod and Dumaguete.

The region was originally established on May 29, 2015, comprising the provinces of Negros Occidental and Negros Oriental and the city of Bacolod, all located on the island of Negros. However, the NIR was abolished on August 9, 2017. Nearly seven years later, the region was re-established on June 11, 2024, by President Bongbong Marcos, this time including Siquijor, an island province southeast of Negros that was previously part of Central Visayas.

== History ==
=== Early initiatives ===
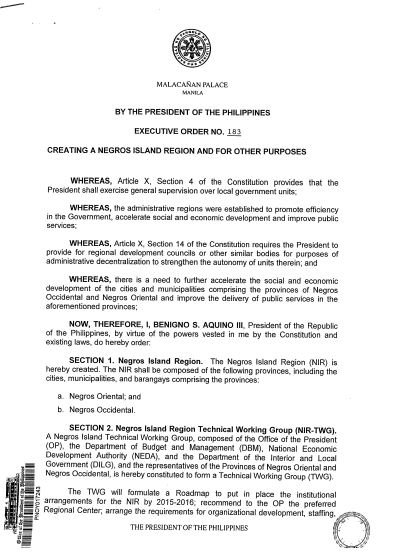
First page of the Executive Order 183 creating the Negros Island Region in 2015. This region would be dissolved in 2017.

Negros has history as a single province and as a briefly independent republic. The movement for a single-island region started in the 1980s, when officials from both provinces proposed a one-island, one-region unit. At the time, Negros Occidental and Negros Oriental were the only provinces in the Philippines situated on the same island but belonging to two different administrative regions. Their regional offices were located in Panay and Cebu respectively. This led to the filing of House of Representatives Bill No. 1477 titled "An Act Merging the Province of Negros Occidental and Oriental into One-Island Region". This argued that the two provinces "nestle in one common island; have common fowls and beasts in the forest; share the same soil in our plains and mountains; benefit and suffer together from the rivers that snake through our land; and our ancestors roamed the same length and breadth without complications of political, social, economic, religious and lingual obstacles."

The proposal was continued through talks between Governor Daniel Lacson Jr. of Negros Occidental and Governor Emilio Macias of Negros Oriental in 1990. Their successors, Rafael Coscolluella and George Arnaiz, respectively, took the initiative further, first identifying Kabankalan in Negros Occidental and the neighboring municipality of Mabinay in Negros Oriental, with the two situated on or near the geographic center of the island, as joint regional centers. However, the National Economic and Development Authority (NEDA) turned down the proposal due to a lack of funding. At the same time, opposition was voiced by some officials from Negros Oriental who feared that the province would be dominated economically by its larger neighbor and Bacolod.

=== Revival of proposal ===
In 2013, the one-island region talks were continued by Negros Oriental Representatives Pryde Henry Teves and George Arnaiz, and Negros Occidental Governor Alfredo Marañon Jr. with Representative Alfredo Marañon III and Coscolluela. They pointed out that, while the creation of a new region would entail substantial costs to the government, it would be advantageous to the people of both provinces because they would not need to travel by sea any more to process transactions in the regional offices. They also claimed that a one-island region would also result in better coordination between both provinces in tourism, peace and order, environment, development planning, disaster management, and road infrastructure. Edward Du, president of the Negros Oriental Chamber of Commerce and Industry, also proposed to convert existing offices of national agencies in the provincial capitals of Bacolod and Dumaguete to sub-regional offices during an interim period if the proposal was approved to defray the costs of establishing a new regional center. Various public officials and representatives from academic, religious, media, and other private sectors aired support for the proposal.

Notably, Negros Oriental Governor Roel Degamo was tagged as being initially opposed to the talks, claiming he was not convinced with a one-island region setup and that his constituents were allegedly not in favor of its creation. He eventually clarified that his original stand as regards the region was being "open" to it and that there were some concerns, such as revenue sharing between the two provinces, that had to be thrashed out first.

President Benigno Aquino III directed the Department of the Interior and Local Government (DILG) to study the establishment of a new region. The DILG subsequently endorsed the proposal, noting that the new region would mean integrated planning for holistic development, disaster management, tourism promotion, and peace and order management. NEDA affirmed by saying that its studies show that the proposed region is economically viable.

=== First establishment (2015-2017) ===
==== Establishment ====
The Negros Island Region from 2015 to 2017

On May 29, 2015, President Aquino signed Executive Order 183, merging the two Negros provinces into one region — the Negros Island Region. It separated Negros Occidental and its capital Bacolod from Western Visayas (Region VI) and Negros Oriental from Central Visayas (Region VII), raising the total number of regions of the Philippines to 18.

==== Abolition ====
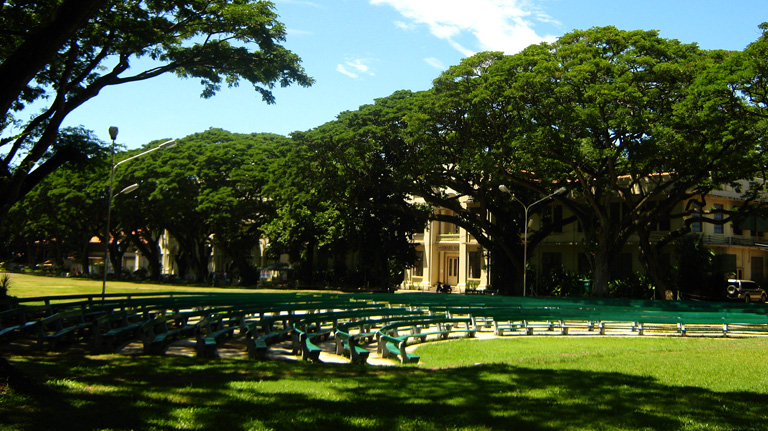
Silliman University in Dumaguete

On August 9, 2017, President Rodrigo Duterte signed Executive Order No. 38, revoking the Executive Order No. 183 after former Department of Budget and Management Secretary Benjamin Diokno cited the cost of retaining the region to be at ₱19 billion. Negros officials expressed disappointment and sadness over the dissolution of the NIR.

=== Second establishment (2020-present) ===
In 2020, some officials from Negros and their allies proposed for the region's reestablishment. A bill was also filed in July 2022, and in 2023, the proposal was again revived. On March 12, 2024, JV Ejercito's Senate Bill No. 2507 or the Negros Island Region Bill was passed on the third and final reading at the Senate. Some officials reiterated their intent for consultation first before reestablishment. The measure was also opposed by the Roman Catholic Diocese of Dumaguete, with Bishop Julito Cortes and eight other senior clergy calling it an "insult" to the people of Negros Oriental and adding that residents of the province as well as Siquijor were not consulted on the matter.

On June 11, 2024, the bill was signed by President Bongbong Marcos as Republic Act No. 12000. The re-established region, this time, included the nearby island province of Siquijor, upon the request of the provincial authorities; Siquijor, previously part of Region VII along with Negros Oriental, was part of Negros Oriental until it became an independent province in 1971. Sixteen regional government offices will be established in Dumaguete, while fourteen will be established in Bacolod. Wilfredo Capundag Jr., the mayor of San Juan, Siquijor, called for the region to be renamed into the Negros Island-Siquijor Administrative Region (NISAR) to acknowledge his province's inclusion.

==== Legal issue ====
In August 2024, a civil society group from Negros Oriental and Siquijor led by Reverend Father Hendrix Alar challenged the legality of Republic Act 12000, allegedly based on its lack of public consultations. It filed with the High Tribunal the petitions for declaratory relief, prohibition, and a temporary restraining order against the creation of the Negros Island Region.

== Geography ==
Negros Island Region consists of two islands: Negros (shared by Negros Occidental and Negros Oriental) and Siquijor. Together, the islands have a total area of 13,525.56 sq. km (5,222.25 sq. mi). Seas and straits surround both of the islands: the Guimaras Strait in the west, the Visayan Sea to the north, Tañon Strait to the east, Bohol Sea in the southeast, and Sulu Sea in the south. The region is defined by extensive flat plains and mountainous ranges that are present in both islands.

Negros is the second largest island in Visayas, after Samar, with an area of 13,309.60 square kilometers (5,138.87 sq ft). The island is primarily volcanic, making it suitable for agriculture. Extensive sugarcane plantations dominate the flat plains, cementing the island's reputation as a sugarcane powerhouse in the country. Mountains on the central section of the island bisect the island politically and linguistically: the Hiligaynon-speaking western half and the Cebuano-speaking eastern half. Kanlaon, one of the most active volcanoes in the Philippines, is the highest point of Negros Island, with its peak situated at 2,465 meters (8,087 ft) above sea level. It is also the highest peak among all the islands in the island group of Visayas. Other prominent peaks include Mandalagan (1,885 m) and Mount Talinis (1,903 m). Lakes are present in the interior part of the island, such as the Twin Lakes of Balinsasayao and Danao recognized as the first ASEAN Heritage Park in the Visayas region due to its rich biodiversity and importance as a watershed. Beaches and several islets dominate the coastal areas of the island, such as Apo Island. Extensive forests dominate in the mountainous region of Northern Negros Natural Park, a protected area of the country situated in the northern portion of the island.

Siquijor is an island located southeast of Negros Oriental. Area-wise, it is the third smallest in the country, with an area of 343.5 square kilometers (132.6 sq mi). Mount Malabahoc, also known as Mount Bandila‑an, is the highest point of the island, with its elevation reaching 628 meters (2,060 ft) above sea level. Marine terraces can be found in San Juan, as well as fossils of the giant clam tridacna in the island's plowed inland fields.

== Administrative divisions ==
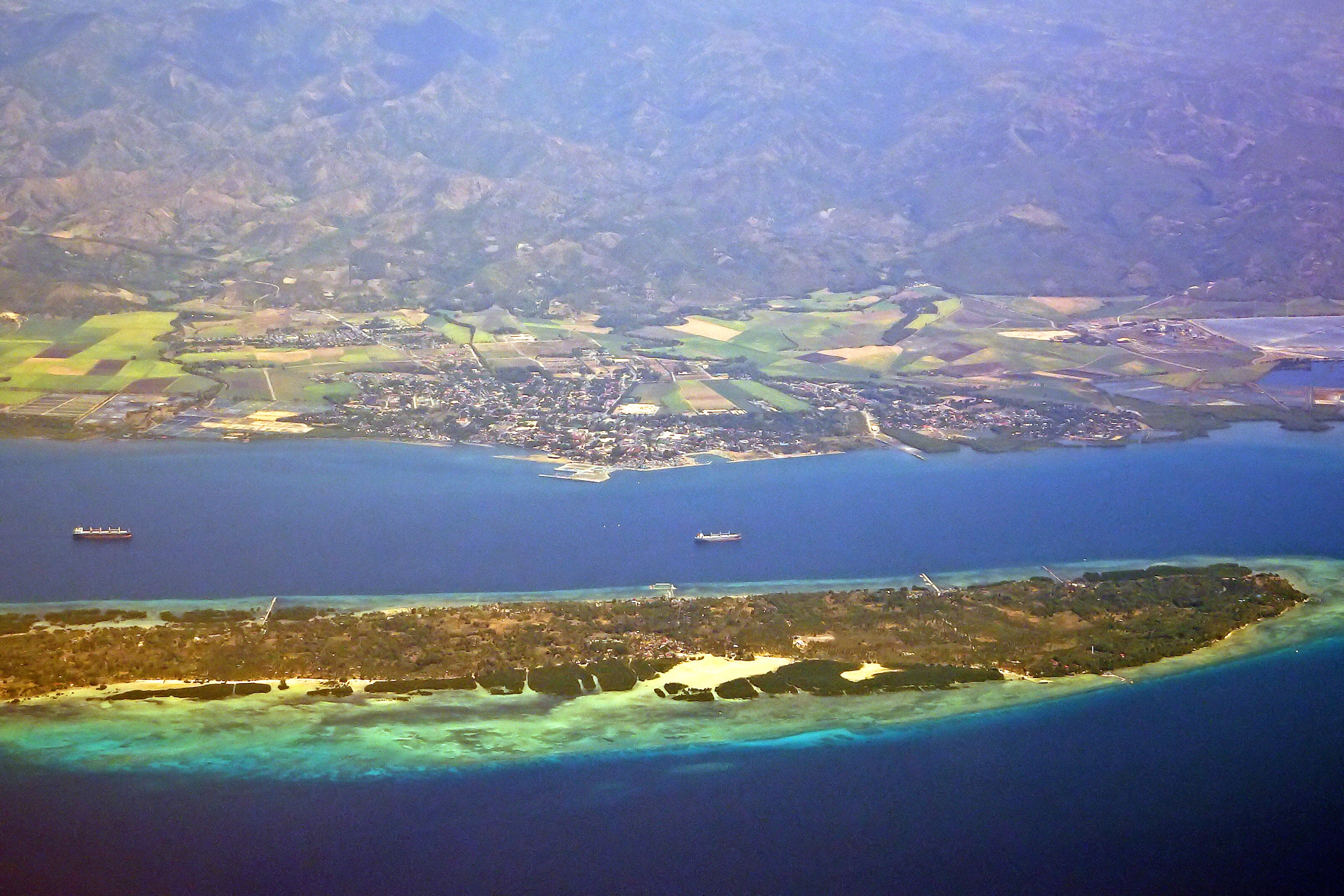
Aerial view of the City of San Carlos, Negros Occidental

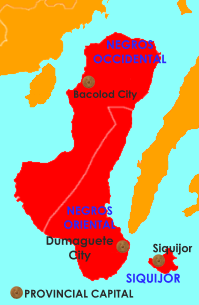
Political map of the current Negros Island Region (since June 2024)

The region has three provinces and 19 cities. Negros Occidental has the most chartered cities amongst all the provinces in the Philippines, with 13, including its provincial capital, Bacolod, though it is governed independently from its corresponding province as a highly urbanized city.

Bacolod, the center of the Bacolod Metropolitan Area (which also contains the cities of Talisay and Silay), is the region's most populous city and the country's 19th; while Dumaguete is the region's most densely populated city.

Bacolod and Dumaguete both serve as the regional centers of the region.

Province or HUC		Capital	Population (2020)		Area		Density		Cities	Muni.	Bgy.
					km^{2}	sq mi	/km^{2}	/sq mi			
Negros Occidental		Bacolod	63.1%	2,623,172	7,802.54	3,012.58	340	880	12	19	601
Negros Oriental		Dumaguete	34.5%	1,432,990	5,385.53	2,079.36	270	700	6	19	557
Siquijor		Siquijor	2.5%	103,395	337.49	130.31	310	800	0	6	134
Bacolod	†	—	14.4%	600,783	162.67	62.81	3,700	9,600	—	—	61
Total				4,760,340	14,140.74	5,459.77	340	880	19	44	1,353
† Bacolod is a highly urbanized city; figures are excluded from Negros Occidental.

=== Governors and vice governors ===
Province	Image	Governor	Political Party	Vice Governor
Negros Occidental		Eugenio Jose Lacson	NPC	Jose Benito Alonso
Negros Oriental		Manuel L. Sagarbarria	PFP	Cezanne Fritz Diaz
Siquijor		Jake Vincent Villa	PFP	Dindo Tumala

=== Cities ===
- † Regional center

City	Population (2020)	Area		Density		City class	Income class	Province
		km^{2}	sq mi	/km^{2}	/sq mi			
† Bacolod	600,783	162.67	62.81	3,700	9,600	Highly urbanized	1st	Negros Occidental
Bago	191,210	401.20	154.90	480	1,200	Component	2nd	Negros Occidental
Bais	84,317	319.64	123.41	260	670	Component	3rd	Negros Oriental
Bayawan	122,747	699.08	269.92	180	470	Component	1st	Negros Oriental
Cadiz	158,544	524.57	202.54	300	780	Component	2nd	Negros Occidental
Canlaon	58,822	170.93	66.00	340	880	Component	4th	Negros Oriental
† Dumaguete	134,103	33.62	12.98	4,000	10,000	Component	2nd	Negros Oriental
Escalante	96,159	192.76	74.43	500	1,300	Component	4th	Negros Occidental
Guihulngan	102,656	388.56	150.02	260	670	Component	5th	Negros Oriental
Himamaylan	116,240	367.04	141.71	320	830	Component	3rd	Negros Occidental
Kabankalan	200,198	697.35	269.25	290	750	Component	1st	Negros Occidental
La Carlota	66,664	137.29	53.01	490	1,300	Component	4th	Negros Occidental
Sagay	148,894	330.34	127.54	450	1,200	Component	3rd	Negros Occidental
San Carlos	132,650	451.50	174.33	290	750	Component	2nd	Negros Occidental
Silay	130,478	214.80	82.93	610	1,600	Component	3rd	Negros Occidental
Sipalay	72,448	379.78	146.63	190	490	Component	4th	Negros Occidental
Talisay	108,909	201.18	77.68	540	1,400	Component	4th	Negros Occidental
Tanjay	82,642	276.05	106.58	300	780	Component	4th	Negros Oriental
Victorias	90,101	133.92	51.71	670	1,700	Component	4th	Negros Occidental

== Demographics ==
Population census of Negros Island Region
Year	Pop.	±% p.a.
1903	525,749	—
1918	688,584	+1.82%
1939	1,277,012	+2.98%
1948	1,583,651	+2.42%
1960	2,049,399	+2.17%
1970	2,219,022	+0.80%
1975	2,595,186	+3.19%
1980	2,820,060	+1.68%
1990	3,256,112	+1.45%
1995	3,533,189	+1.54%
2000	3,777,409	+1.44%
2010	4,285,591	+1.27%
2015	4,509,515	+0.97%
2020	4,760,340	+1.15%
2024	4,904,944	+0.72%
Source: Philippine Statistics Authority

=== Languages ===
The native languages of Negros Island Region are:

- Cebuano, spoken in Negros Oriental, eastern Negros Occidental and Siquijor.
- Hiligaynon, spoken in the majority of Negros Occidental and some parts of Negros Oriental which share boundaries between the two provinces.
- Carolan, spoken by the Ati people on the highlands between Negros Occidental and Negros Oriental.
- Magahat, spoken by the Ati people on the mountains of southern Negros Oriental.
- Tagalog, spoken in Negros Occidental, Negros Oriental and Siquijor.

== Economy ==
Poverty incidence of Negros Island Region (%)

Source: Philippine Statistics Authority

The Negros Island Region is the second largest regional economy in the Visayas after Central Visayas, both in GDP nominal and GDP per capita, and the eighth largest regional economy in the Philippines overall, with a GDP nominal of 14.8 billion USD for 2025.

The economy is robust, growing by 5.9% in 2024 to PHP 636 billion, outpacing the national average. Driven by a 21.8% share in wholesale/retail trade, 13.1% in agriculture (despite declining sugar, palay, and corn production), and 11.3% in manufacturing, the region is shifting toward industrialization. Key sectors include sugarcane, IT-BPO, renewable energy, and tourism.

== Transport ==
Bacolod–Silay Airport and Sibulan Airport are the only airports in the regions which provides domestic air services to other parts of the Philippines. Sipalay Airport and Siquijor Airport are community feeder airports with limited regional flights serving the general area of Sipalay and the island province of Siquijor, respectively.
