= Bukidnon language =

Bukidnon may be any of several Philippine languages:

- Binukid language
- Sulod language
- Magahat language
- Karolanos language

== See also ==
- Western Bukidnon language
