= Negrenses =

Philippine cultural group

Total population
- 3,948,240 (Negros Occidental, Negros Oriental and Siquijor only)

Regions with significant populations
- Philippines; Homeland: Negros Occidental, Negros Oriental, Siquijor; Other regions with significant populations: Soccsksargen, Northern Mindanao, Davao Region, Metro Manila United States; Canada; Australia; United Kingdom; Italy; Israel United Arab Emirates

Languages
- Indigenous; Hiligaynon, Cebuano, Carolan, Magahat and Karay·a; Nonindigenous; Filipino, English

Religion
- Christianity (predominantly Catholicism and minority Protestantism), Dayawism

Related ethnic groups
- Hiligaynon, Karay·a, Cebuanos, Boholanos, Ati, Pampangans

The Negrenses (/nəˈɡrɛnseɪ/; Hiligaynon and Cebuano pronunciation: [nɛˈɡɾɛnsɛ]) are the native cultural group of the Philippine provinces of Negros Occidental, Negros Oriental and Siquijor.

== Overview ==
Negrense (English: Negrense; Hiligaynon and Cebuano: Negrosanon or Buglasnon) identity is closely intertwined with the history and culture of Negros and Siquijor, the latter which had been part of Negros Oriental until 1971. This identity first emerged in the 19th century when Spanish-speaking migrant landowners – mostly but not exclusively from Panay, Cebú and Bohol – and their families started to develop and strengthen an independent, common identity tied neither to ethnicity nor language but rather to the land.

== History ==
=== Precolonial period ===
Negros was originally known as Buglas, an old Visayan word meaning "cut off". The original natives of the island are the Ati Negritos, from where the island would later derive its name after an expedition of Castilian conquistadors in April 1565 came in contact with the Ati in what is now the town of Ilog.

Southern Negros – in particular, Candoni – came to be settled by precolonial migrants from the island of Panay. These came to be known as the Negrense highlanders (Hiligaynon and Cebuano: bukidnong Buglasnon or Magahat). A second wave of migrants from Panay came to inhabit the northwestern portion of the island; they are known today as the Panayan highlanders (Hiligaynon and Cebuano: bukidnong Panaynon or Suludnon), who continue to reside on Panay as well as on Negros.

=== Spanish colonial era ===
After the island was discovered by Castilian colonizers in April 1565, it was only in 1573 and 1583 that the island was settled permanently, centered around Binalbagan and the designated capital, Ilog in the present-day Negros Occidental, and Dumaguete in the present-day Negros Oriental. Miguel López de Legazpi placed Negros under the jurisdiction of the governor of Oton on Panay. In 1734, however, the island became a military district with Ilog as its first capital. The seat of government was later transferred to Himamaylan until Bacólod became the capital in 1849, heralding the opening of the sugar industry spearheaded by British diplomat and businessman Nicholas Loney. Through the missionary efforts of the Recollects, additional settlements in Hinigaran, Bago, Marayo (now Pontevedra), Mamalan (now Himamaylan) and San Enrique.

==== Sugar boom ====
The mass settlement of Negros, beginning in the 1850s and greatly encouraged by Loney, was triggered by the surge in the demand for sugar back in Europe. European demand and Philippine supply would place Negros squarely on the British-dominated global economic map for the next hundred years. The mass settlement was pioneered by Iloílo-based landowners, though the mountainous terrain of the island made it more practical for colonists to settle the coastal areas on opposite ends. As a result, the western half came to be settled by Hiligaynon-speaking migrants, while the eastern half was settled by Cebuano-speaking migrants, with subsequent settlers from other parts of the Philippines assimilating into either linguistic sphere. Administration became difficult as the trip between the eastern portions to Himamaylan (the second capital) and later on, Bacólod in 1849, required a 3–5-day trek through the mountains. Thirteen Recollect friars assigned to the eastern side appealed to the Governor-General to divide the island, with their side assigned to the civil government in Cebú.

Finally, on January 1, 1890, Governor-General Valeriano Weyler issued a decree, partitioning Negros into Negros Occidental, with Bacólod retained as its designated capital, and Negros Oriental, with Dumaguete as the designated capital. The division was not made along linguistic lines but rather for practical administrative purposes: those falling under the jurisdiction of the 13 friars composed the new Negros Oriental province, which also includes the Hiligaynon-speaking towns of Tolong (present-day Santa Catalina) and Tolong Nuevo (present-day Bayawan). The Cebuano-speaking towns of Sagay, Escalante, San Carlos (all three later converted into cities) and Calatrava chose to remain with Negros Occidental.

==== Negros Revolution ====
The armed uprising against Spanish colonial rule was divided between Papa Isio's dumaan and sacada army and the hacendero-led cantonal forces, between which relations were tense. Both armies as well had inconstant relations with the Malolos Republic, with the former being denigrated by its ilustrado core for his Dayawism, and the latter breaking away from it to form the Republic of Negros under US protection. Papa Isio would continue the Philippine Revolution until 1907, when he surrendered to the newly formed Philippine Constabulary. He is remembered as the last of the Malolos revolutionaries to surrender, outlasting even the Malolos Republic.

=== Emigration ===
In the aftermath of World War II, there began a steady rise of migration to Mindanao. Many Negrenses, who would otherwise inherit only a small portion of family land on Negros, availed of resettlement benefits from the government instead. This diaspora on Mindanao would in turn spur the creation of the sugar industries in the highland areas of Northern Mindanao and Soccsksargen. Families such as the Montillas and Zubiris of southern Negros would also rise to political prominence in their adopted provinces of Sultan Kudarat and Bukidnon, respectively. Mindanao localities that are home to the highest concentrations of diaspora Negrenses are found in Valencia, Tacurong, Kidapawan, Koronadal and General Santos, while significant numbers reside in Dávao, Zamboanga and Cagayán de Oro as well.

With the declaration of martial law by President Ferdinand Marcos in 1972 and the collapse of the sugar industry on Negros in the 1980s due to the expiration a few years earlier of the Laurel–Langley Agreement, which had previously guaranteed Philippine sugar-producers access to the US market, Negrense families emigrated en masse from Negros to the United States, Canada and Australia to escape the economic losses incurred with the steep decline of the island's main crop. Large diaspora populations have since formed in the United States (Hawaii, California, New Jersey and New York) and in Australia (Queensland and New South Wales). Sizable diasporas have also emerged in Canada, France, Germany, Israel, Italy, Saudi Arabia, the United Arab Emirates and the United Kingdom, where they work and live as either overseas workers or permanent expatriates.

The collapse of the Negros sugar industry and the "widespread hunger, unemployment, and terrorism" that subsequently engulfed the island accounts for the large Negrense presence outside the homeland, whether in other parts of the country or abroad. All strata of Negrense society took part in the emigration from the island: from the impoverished sacadas and dumaan to the landowning hacenderos, the latter now easily stripped by Marcos of their kingmaker roles in national politics. During this time, the troubles on Negros – including the infamous Escalante massacre – made the island "briefly famous in the international media" as a "social volcano". Among the emigrant children of hacenderos, many would "recall being embarrassed to admit that their families planted sugar[cane] on Negros". Several of those whom remained on the island would even lament that the opulent lifestyle that had been afforded by their past fortunes had "made their parents and grandparents lazy and smug". In the 1990s, President Fidel Ramos would further erode the hacenderos' political and economic clout through the abolition of protectionist sugar-import tariffs. Violent socioeconomic conflict, albeit much reduced, continues to plague Negrense society to this day, the latest series of incidents being the Negros killings of 2017 to 2019.

=== Present ===
Between 2015 and 2017, Negros and the surrounding islands had been administered as a single regional unit, the Negros Region. The region was dissolved by President Rodrigo Duterte and his allies in the cabinet.

In spite of the troubles that continue to beset the Negrense people, particularly those who live on mainland Negros, the island today positions itself at the centre of organic-food production and tourism in the Philippines, seeking to move away from the colonial single-crop economy to one rebuilt on sustainable food systems. In 2005, the provincial governments of Negros Occidental and Negros Oriental jointly declared the island as the first GMO-free zone in the country. Other provinces and independently administered cities would gradually follow suit by banning the use of pesticides, the entry of GMOs or both.

== Culture ==
=== Language ===
Migration into and within Negros, especially during the fortune-seeking decades of the late-Spanish and US-colonial eras, has created a distinct blend of people, culture and languages, with the northwestern half, comprising Negros Occidental, having a Hiligaynon-speaking majority, while the southeastern half, comprising Negros Oriental, having a Cebuano-speaking majority. Descendants of the indigenous Magahat and Ati peoples speak the Magahat language, which is heavily influenced by Hiligaynon and Karay·a as a result of their interactions and intermarriage with colonial-era migrants from Iloílo and Antique; while those descended from the Panayan highlanders speak Sulod. The Carolan language continues to be spoken in Kabankalan by descendants of the indigenous Carolans. The Cebuano language predominates in Siquijor.

=== Religion ===
The majority of Negrenses are Christians; for the most part Catholics with a number of Orthodox and Protestant faithful. Negrenses of Chinese heritage may practise either Buddhism or Taoism or both, at times alongside Christianity. Dayawism, which is the umbrella term for the Philippines' indigenous folk religions, remains quite popular.

=== Cuisine ===
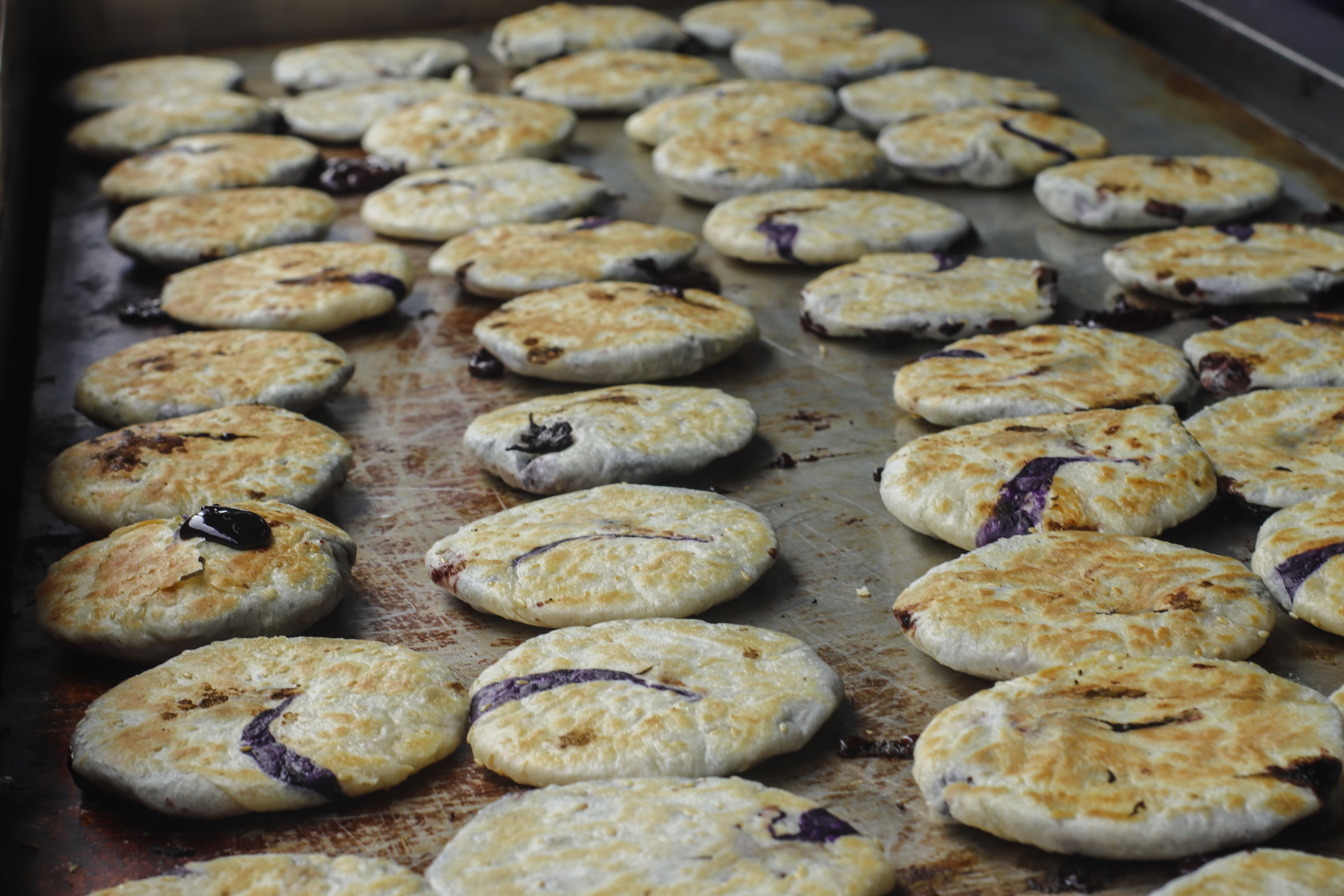
Piaya

The Negrense homeland is known for the culinary skills of its inhabitants. Piyaya (Spanish: piaya) is a muscovado-filled flatbread, while napoleones are an especially sought-after Negrense pastry. Traditional dishes and modes of preparation brought by immigrants from the neighboring island of Panay but which are now also emblematic of Negrense cuisine include batsoy (Spanish: bachoy), binakol, inasal, kansi (Spanish: cansí) and various pigeon-pea (Hiligaynon: kadyos, from the general Malay word for ‘bean’, kacang) soups. Alcoholic beverages consumed include lumboy wine produced in Siquijor and rum produced in the Negros provinces.

=== Society ===
Negrense society has from its inception been heavily stratified, divided between the seasonal sacada laborers, the settled dumaan farmhands, the millers and the landowning hacenderos. This had more than occasionally been the cause of bitter rivalries between the millers and hacenderos, and continues to be at the root of violent socioeconomic conflict between them, the sacadas and even the dumaan. Marriages, as well, between Negros-based sugar families and their counterparts in other regions are not unusual. The implosion of the export-dependent sugar industry in the mid-1970s would gradually blur, though not completely erase, the inherited distinctions.

== Notable people ==
The following is a list of Negrenses resident either in the Negros provinces and Siquijor, elsewhere in the Philippines or abroad. The large diaspora population is a result of the waves of emigration from the Negros provinces during the latter half of the 20th century.

== See also ==
- Balay Negrense
- Negros Museum
- Negros Trade Fair
