= Negros Trade Fair =

Negros Trade Fair is Manila's longest running provincial trade fair started in 1985 by the Manila-based Negrenses who were moved by the news of poverty among the sugar farm workers in Negros Island. The First Negros Trade Fair was organized at the Makati Carpark at the behest of Bea Zobel from Ayala Land, Inc. with goods coming from backyard industries of Negros. Daniel "Bitay" Lacson, Jr., then Negros Navigation President and CEO, shipped the goods from Bacolod to Manila for free. The movement later grew as Bitay Lacson was appointed as OIC Governor of Negros Occidental and was re-elected into office.
