= Agtaa language =

Agtaa may refer to:

- Ati language of Panay
- Magahat language of Negros
