= Bacolod–Silay Airport =

Airport serving Bacolod, Negros Occidental, Philippines

Bacolod–Silay Airport Hulugpaan sang Bacolod–Silay Paliparan ng Bacolod–Silay
- Airport exterior
- IATA: BCD; ICAO: RPVB

Summary
- Airport type: Public
- Owner/Operator: Civil Aviation Authority of the Philippines
- Serves: Metro Bacolod
- Location: Barangay Bagtic, Silay, Negros Occidental, Philippines
- Opened: January 18, 2008; 18 years ago
- Elevation AMSL: 26 m (85 ft)
- Coordinates: 10°46′35″N 123°00′55″E
- Website: www.bacolod-silayairport.com

Map
- Location within Visayas Location within Philippines

Runways
Direction	Length		Surface
Direction	m	ft	Surface
03/21	2,000	6,568	Asphalt concrete

Statistics (2023)
- Passengers: 1,874,261 ▲28.537%
- Aircraft movements: 14,040 ▲40.93%
- Cargo (in kg): 13,884,796 ▲29.31%
- Source: CAAP

Bacolod–Silay Airport (IATA: BCD, ICAO: RPVB) also referred to as Bacolod–Silay International Airport, is an airport serving the general area of Metro Bacolod, located in the Negros Island Region of the Philippines.

The airport is located 15 kilometers (9.3 mi) northeast of Bacolod on a 181-hectare (450-acre) site in Barangay Bagtic, Silay, Negros Occidental. The facility inherited its IATA and ICAO airport codes from Bacolod City Domestic Airport, which it replaced in 2008. Capable of handling international air traffic, the airport is the busier of the two major airports serving Negros Island, the other being Dumaguete Sibulan Airport in Sibulan, Negros Oriental.

Despite being billed as an international airport, Bacolod–Silay is designated as a Class 1 Principal domestic airport by the Civil Aviation Authority of the Philippines, a body of the Department of Transportation that is responsible for the operations of not only this airport but also of all other public airports in the Philippines except the major international airports.

== History ==
The site of Bacolod–Silay Airport was one of the main airfields for the Imperial Japanese Army Air Service (IJAAS) bombers and fighters in Negros. It was captured by American forces in 1944 and 1945. After the war, parts of the airfield became a sugarcane plantation.

The airport's control tower

Planning for a new airport for Bacolod commenced in 1997, when the Japan International Cooperation Agency initiated a study indicating the need for expansion at four Philippine airports: namely Bacolod City Domestic Airport, Mandurriao Airport in Iloilo City, Legazpi Airport in Legazpi and Daniel Z. Romualdez Airport in Tacloban.

In February 1999, another JICA study was commissioned, this time on the detailed plan of the new airport. The study was completed by March 2000 and was funded by a 430 million-yen grant. Immediately after the completion of the study, JICA hired Pacific Consultants International as advisers to the project.

The project was opened for bidding on August 25, 2003, with the winning bid going to the Takenaka–Itochu Joint Venture (TIJV). Physical construction on the new 4.3 billion-peso airport, funded in part by an 8.2 billion yen loan, commenced in August 2004. A 900-day deadline was imposed for the airport to be completed, which broadly corresponded to January 2007. During construction, remains of the Japanese airfield and some war aircraft wrecks were dug.

On July 13, 2007, President Gloria Macapagal Arroyo attended the facility's inauguration. The airport was considered complete by July 16, but there was "considerable debate" over whether the airport should be opened for regular commercial traffic due to the 500-meter (1,600 ft) runway extension, necessary for accommodating larger aircraft, not having been built by that time.

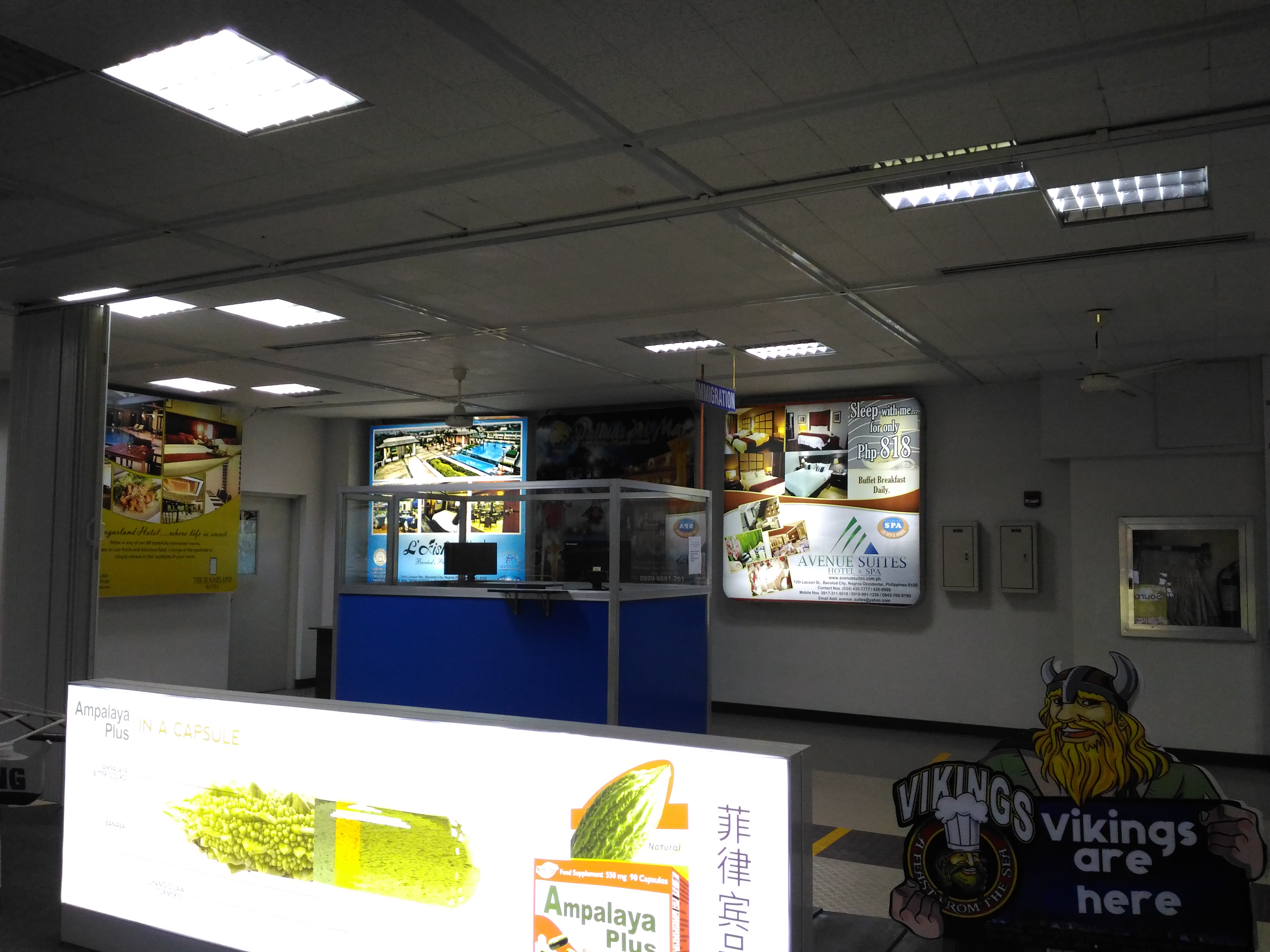
Immigration and customs desks inside the airport

The first aircraft ever to land at the airport was a small fourteen-seater turboprop owned by Vincent Aviation. The Reims-Cessna F406 with aircraft registration number ZK-VAF, piloted by Steve Gray of New Zealand landed at the airport on September 26, 2007, at 9:55 a.m.

The airport commenced regular commercial operations and was officially opened on January 18, 2008. The first commercial flight to arrive was Cebu Pacific's Flight 5J 473 from Manila, an Airbus A319-100 piloted by Silay native Captain Allan Garces which landed at 5:22 a.m. PST on the day of opening. The first international flight to arrive at the airport was a chartered plane from Almaty, Kazakhstan which landed at 10:58 a.m. on January 2, 2009 carrying eight passengers and eight crew members.

Zest Air chartered international flights to and from Incheon using the Airbus A320 from January 7 to February 22, 2012, and also used to serve the route seasonally for South Korean golfers. This seasonal route was also operated by Philippine Airlines utilizing the Airbus A321 from December 24, 2015, to February 21, 2016, offering flights to tourists, non-golfers, and the local flying public.

By late 2014, the airport has been equipped with customs, immigration and quarantine booths in preparation for the increase in international arrivals. Since October 2015, the Bureau of Immigration has also indicated readiness to deploy personnel at the airport should regularly scheduled international flights commence, but as of 2023, there are no regularly scheduled international flights operating to and from the airport.

== Structure ==
=== Runway ===
The Bacolod–Silay Airport has one primary runway, which is 45 meters (148 ft) wide and 2,000 meters (6,600 ft) long. The runway runs in a direction of 03°/21° and can currently handle aircraft as large as the Airbus A330. Provisions for a 500-meter (1,600 ft) expansion of the present runway in order to accommodate even larger aircraft were confirmed on May 23, 2009, when it was reported that the budget for the construction of the 500-meter extension of the runway has been approved by the Philippine government and bidding and construction was slated to start in the 3rd or 4th quarter of 2009, but it has not been expanded yet.

The airport is equipped with an instrument landing system (ILS), making it capable of handling night and low-visibility landings.

=== Passenger terminal ===
The airport terminal building.

The interior of the terminal building.

The entire airport complex is designed to handle an excess of one million passengers and 16,715 tonnes (36,850,000 lb) of cargo annually and consists of 21 buildings with a total floor space of 10,075 square meters (108,450 sq ft).

The largest building in the complex is the 6,187-square-meter (66,600 sq ft) main passenger terminal with three levels. The ground floor holds the check-in counters, the public concourse, the arrival area and the information counter. The second floor has the three pre-departure areas with their VIP and CIP lounges; these pre-departure areas lead out to three jet bridges at an apron that can handle up to five aircraft simultaneously. Philippine Airlines also operates a Mabuhay Lounge for the use of its business class passengers on the second floor. Also on the second floor are Merci Pasalubong Shop and Bong-Bong's Pasalubong Shop, occupying the spot of the former Civil Aviation Authority of the Philippines office since it transferred to the Administration Building. On the third floor is the viewing deck with a concession area and rooms for maintenance and airport machinery. Beginning on August 10, 2026, the terminal will be constructed and will increase the seating capacity from 500 to 1,480 passengers.

The state-of-the-art main passenger terminal is equipped with a flight information display system, mechanized baggage handling systems for both inbound and outbound baggage, numerous security x-ray machines, and elevators, and escalators. Outside the main building is a parking lot which can accommodate up to 350 cars.

== Airlines and destinations ==
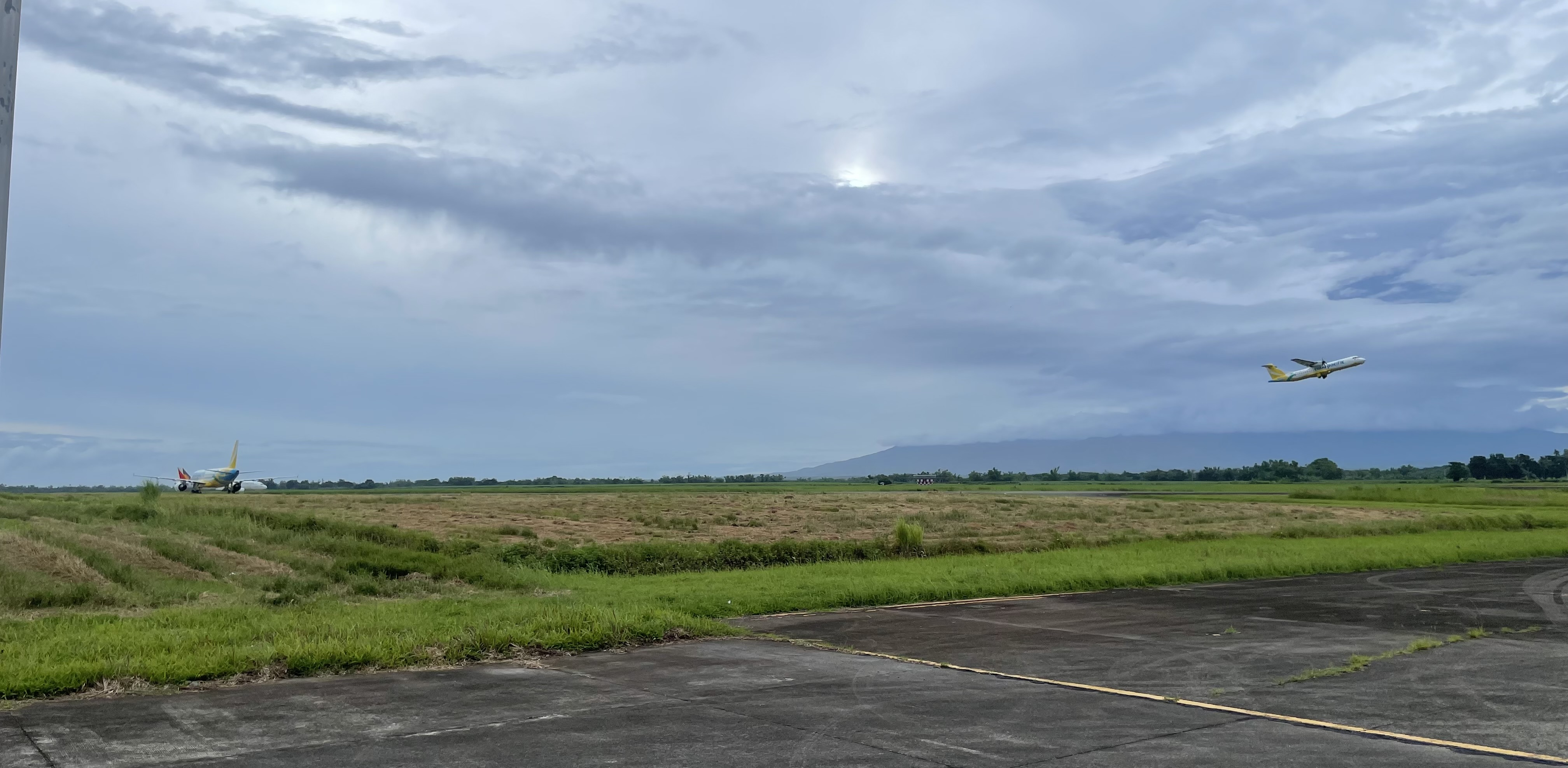
An Airbus A320 of Philippine Airlines holding short runway 21 for Cebgo ATR-72 and an Airbus A320 of Cebu Pacific taxiing to the ramp

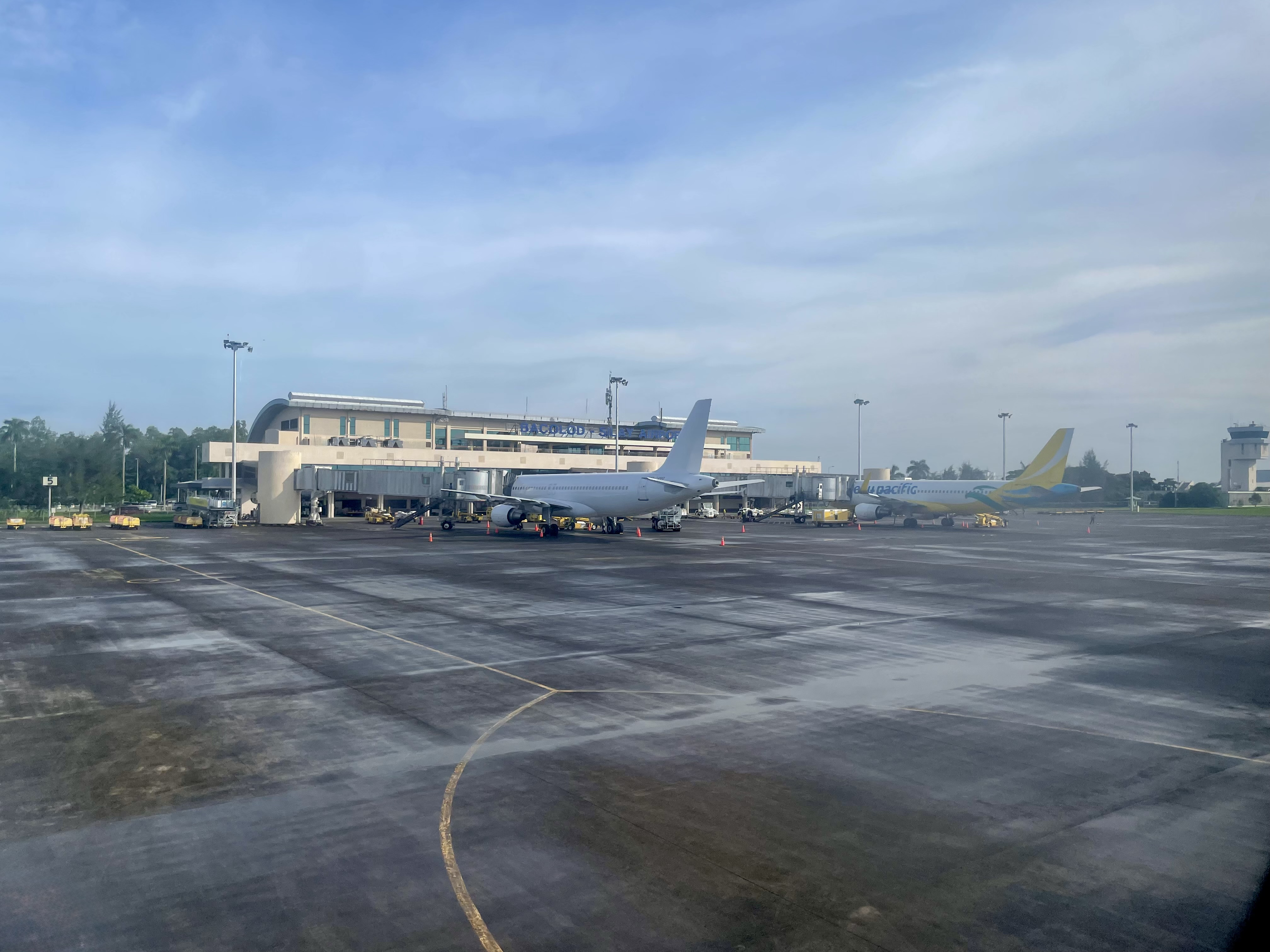
Aircraft parked on the apron in front of the terminal building

Airlines	Destinations
Cebgo	Cebu
Cebu Pacific	Davao, Manila
PAL Express	Cebu, Manila
Philippines AirAsia	Manila

== Statistics ==
Data from Civil Aviation Authority of the Philippines (CAAP).

Year	Passenger movements		Aircraft movements		Cargo movements (in kg)	
Year	Domestic	% change	Domestic	% change	Domestic	% change
2008	843,488	▲7.32	9,860	▼0.06	8,244,579	▼0.54
2009	1,050,429	▲24.53	6,129	▼37.84	11,688,406	▲41.77
2010	1,223,491	▲16.48	9,677	▲57.89	12,502,755	▲6.97
2011	1,349,442	▲10.29	7,860	▼18.78	13,667,720	▲9.32
2012	1,018,417	▼24.53	11,794	▲50.05	8,367,821	▼38.78
2013	1,768,803	▲73.68	21,326	▲80.82	10,684,186	▲27.68
2014	1,317,841	▼25.50	13,756	▼35.50	11,091,730	▲3.81
2015	1,642,391	▲24.63	18,460	▲34.20	15,710,450	▲41.64
2016	1,498,741	▼8.75	18,946	▲2.63	16,533,566	▲5.24
2017	1,579,199	▲5.37	22,275	▲17.57	15,266,797	▼7.66
2018	1,770,226	▲10.79	26,544	▲19.16	18,085,750	▲18.46
2019	1,706,229	▼3.62	26,165	▼1.43	18,370,977	▲1.58
2020	445,480	▼73.89	9,024	▼65.51	6,823,796	▼62.86
2021	238,882	▼46.38	5,210	▼42.27	7,999,428	▲17.23
2022	1,322,149	▲453.47	9,962	▲91.21	10,736,837	▲34.22
2023	1,874,261	▲28.537	14,040	▲40.93	13,884,796	▲29.31
2025	2,079,342	▲10.94	14,682	▲4.57	13,362,322	▼ -3.76

== Accidents and incidents ==
- On December 27, 2024 PAL Express Flight 2P-2285, a De Havilland Canada Dash 8-400, skidded off Runway 03 during heavy rainfall. All passengers and crew were unharmed.

== Ground transportation ==
Airport transportation is accessible to passengers travelling in or out of the airport from Bacolod. There are multiple Public Utility Vehicles (PUVs) that offer shuttle services. There are also tricycles outside the airport that provide transportation to nearby destinations in Silay. The new access road connecting the airport and Bacolod is completed and is now accessible to vehicles. It connects to Barangay Bata in Bacolod.

== See also ==
- Bacolod City Domestic Airport
- List of airports in the Philippines
- Civil Aviation Authority of the Philippines
