= Negros =

Island in the Philippines

Native name: Buglas
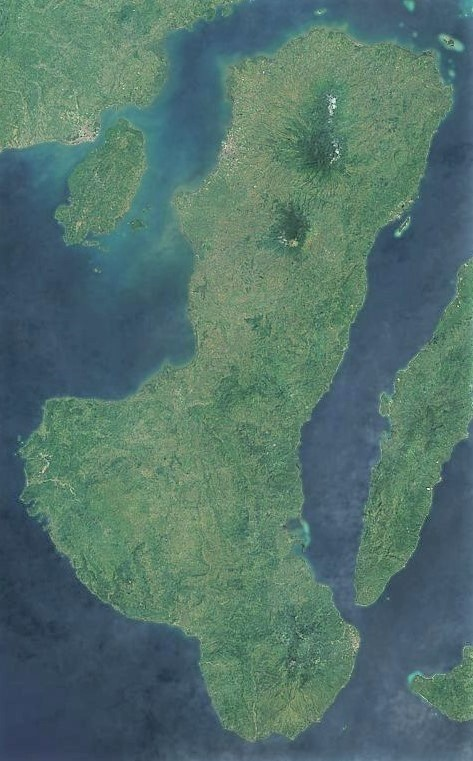
- Negros island satellite image captured by Sentinel-2 in 2016

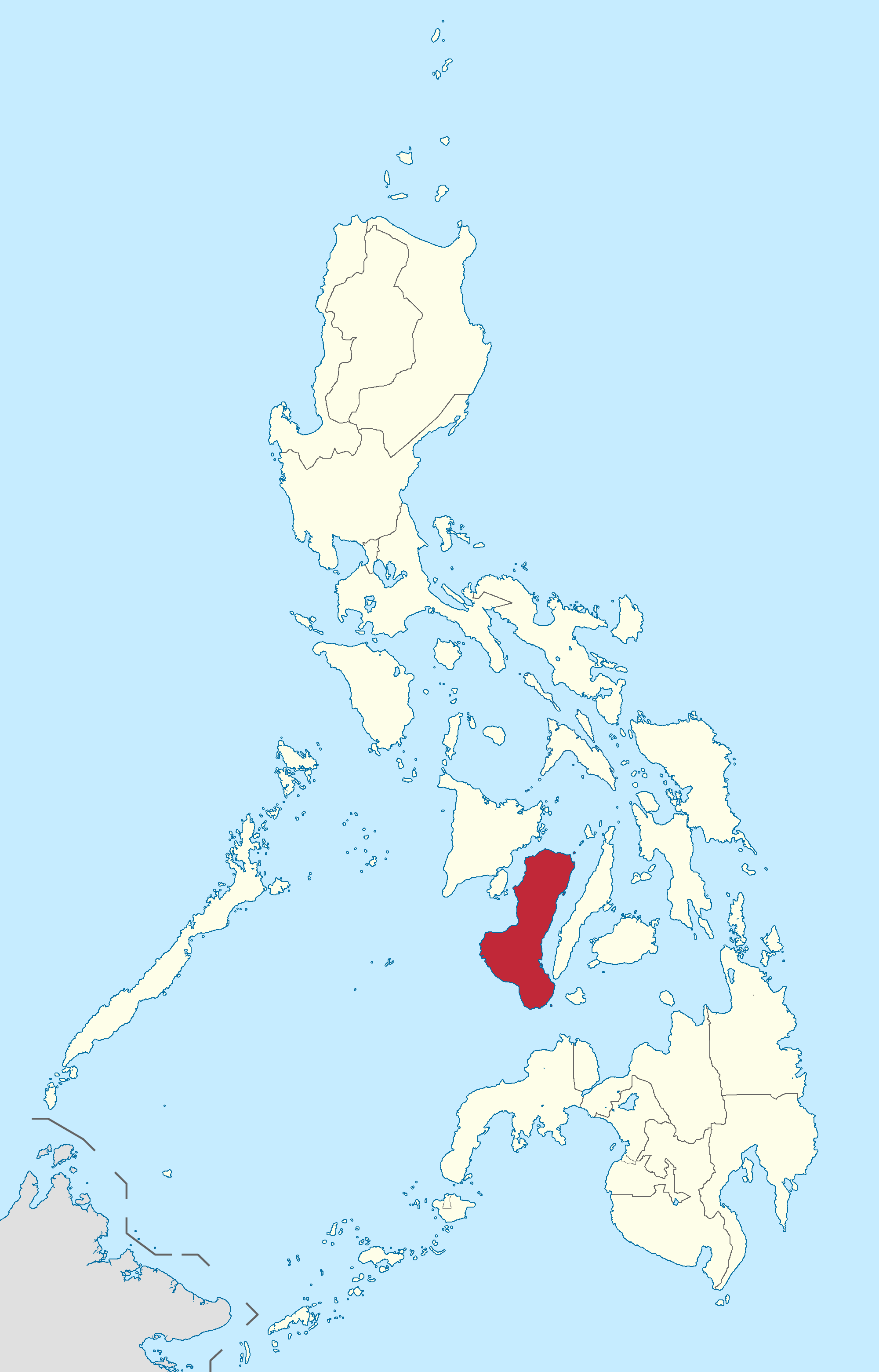
- Location in the Philippines
- Etymology: Spanish negros, "blacks," referring to the Negrense people

Geography
- Location: Southeast Asia
- Coordinates: 10°N 123°E
- Archipelago: Visayas
- Adjacent to: Bohol Sea; Guimaras Strait; Panay Gulf; Sulu Sea; Tañon Strait; Visayan Sea
- Area: 13,309.60 km^{2} (5,138.87 sq mi)
- Area rank: 62nd
- Coastline: 644.90 km (400.722 mi)
- Highest elevation: 2,465 m (8087 ft)
- Highest point: Kanlaon

Administration
- Philippines
- Region: Negros Island Region
- Provinces: Negros Occidental; Negros Oriental
- Largest settlement: Bacolod (pop. 624,787)

Demographics
- Demonym: Negrenses/Negrosanons, NegOrenses (Negros Oriental residents)
- Population: 4,797,302 (2024)
- Population rank: 23tf
- Pop. density: 331.7/km^{2} (859.1/sq mi)
- Languages: Bisayan languages (Hiligaynon, Cebuano, Carolan, Karay-a, Magahat); Filipino; English (Filipino English, Bislish); Filipino Sign
- Ethnic groups: Visayans (Hiligaynons and Cebuanos)

Additional information
- Time zone: Philippine Standard Time (UTC+8)
- Official website: negros-occ.gov.ph and negor.website

Negros (English: /ˈneɪɡroʊs, ˈnɛɡ-/, UK: /ˈneɪɡrɒs/, Tagalog: [ˈnegɾos]) is the fourth largest and third most populous island in the Philippines, with a total land area of 13,309 km^{2} (5,139 sq mi). The coastal zone of the southern part of Negros is identified as a site of highest marine biodiversity importance in the Coral Triangle.

Negros is one of the many islands of the Visayas, in the central part of the country. The predominant inhabitants of the island region are mainly called Negrenses (locally Negrosanons). As of 2024 census, the total population of Negros is 4,797,302 people. This puts it among the 25 most populous islands in the world, close in population to Sicily or Bali.

From 2015 to 2017, the whole island was governed as an administrative region officially named the Negros Island Region, which comprised the highly urbanized city of Bacolod and the provinces of Negros Occidental and Negros Oriental, along with its corresponding outlying islands and islets within a total regional area of 13,350.74 km^{2} (5,154.75 sq mi). It was created on May 29, 2015, by virtue of Executive Order No. 183 issued by President Benigno Aquino III. On August 9, 2017, the region was dissolved after President Rodrigo Duterte signed Executive Order No. 38, reverting its constituents to their previous regions.

On June 13, 2024, Negros island together with neighboring Siquijor were grouped together under a reconstituted Negros Island Region with Republic Act No. 12000 signed by President Bongbong Marcos.

== History ==
=== Precolonial era ===
Negros was originally called Buglas, an old Hiligaynon word thought to mean "cut off", as the island was thought to have been separated from a larger landmass. It was also known as Mamaylan and Panilougon among Cebuano-speaking Visayans. Among its earliest inhabitants were the aboriginal Ata, one of several Negrito Indigenous Peoples dispersed throughout Southeast Asia that possesses a unique culture. The westernmost portions of the island soon fell under the nominal rule of the Kedatuan of Madja-as based on the neighboring islands of Panay and Guimaras, while the eastern coasts were influenced by the Rajahnate of Cebu from the adjacent island of Cebu.

=== Spanish colonization ===
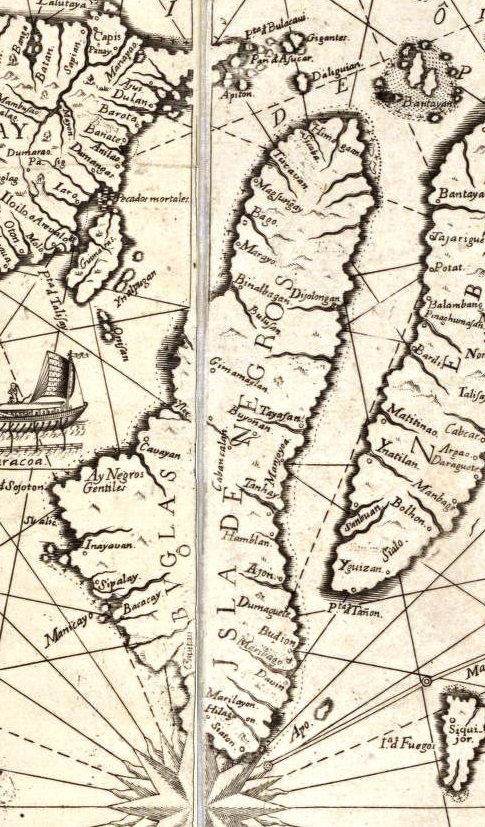
Negros Island ("Buglas") as depicted in the Carta Hydrographica y Chorographica de las Yslas Filipinas (1734)

Upon arriving on the island in April 1565, the Spanish colonizers called the land Negros, after the dark-skinned natives they had observed. Two of the earliest native settlements, Binalbagan and Ilog, became towns in 1573 and 1584, respectively, while other settlements of the period included Hinigaran, Bago, Marayo (now Pontevedra), Mamalan (now Himamaylan), and Candaguit (now a sitio of San Enrique).

After appointing encomenderos for the island, Miguel López de Legazpi placed Negros under the jurisdiction of the governor of Oton in Panay. In 1734, however, the island became a military district with Ilog as its first capital. The seat of government was later transferred to Himamaylan until Bacolod became the capital in 1849. In 1865, Negros and its outlying minor islands along with Siquijor was converted into a politico-military province. By the end of the 1700s, Negros Island had 5,741 native families.

By 1818, Negros Island had 200 Spanish-Filipino and Spanish-Filipino Mestizo tributes-families. Of which, Dumaguete had 25 Spanish-Filipino families; Amlan had 155 Spanish-Filipino families; Ilog had 25 Spanish-Filipino families; Bacolod had 37 Spanish-Filipino families; and finally, Silay had 25 Spanish-Filipino families.

In 1890, the island was officially partitioned into the present-day provinces of Negros Occidental and Negros Oriental. The Spanish Governor, D. Isidro Castro y Cinceros, surrendered to the Negros Revolutionaries, led by Aniceto Lacson and Juan Araneta, on November 6, 1898. General Miller appointed Aniceto as Governor of the Island in March 1899.

=== Negros Revolution and formation of Republic of Negros ===
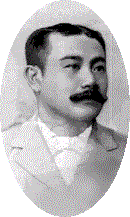
Aniceto Lacson President of the Republic of Negros a canton of the First Philippine Republic.

Flag of the short-lived Negros Republic

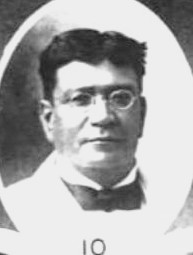
Demetrio Larena, vice president of the Republic of Negros

From November 3 – 6, 1898, the Negrense peoples rose in revolt against the local Spanish colonial government headed by politico-military governor Colonel Isidro de Castro. The Spaniards decided to surrender upon seeing armed troops marching in a pincer movement towards Bacolod. The revolutionaries, led by General Juan Araneta from Bago and General Aniceto Lacson from Talisay, bore fake arms consisting of rifles carved out of palm fronds and cannons of rolled bamboo mats painted black. By the afternoon of November 6, Col. de Castro signed the Act of Capitulation, thus ending centuries of Spanish colonial rule in Negros Occidental.

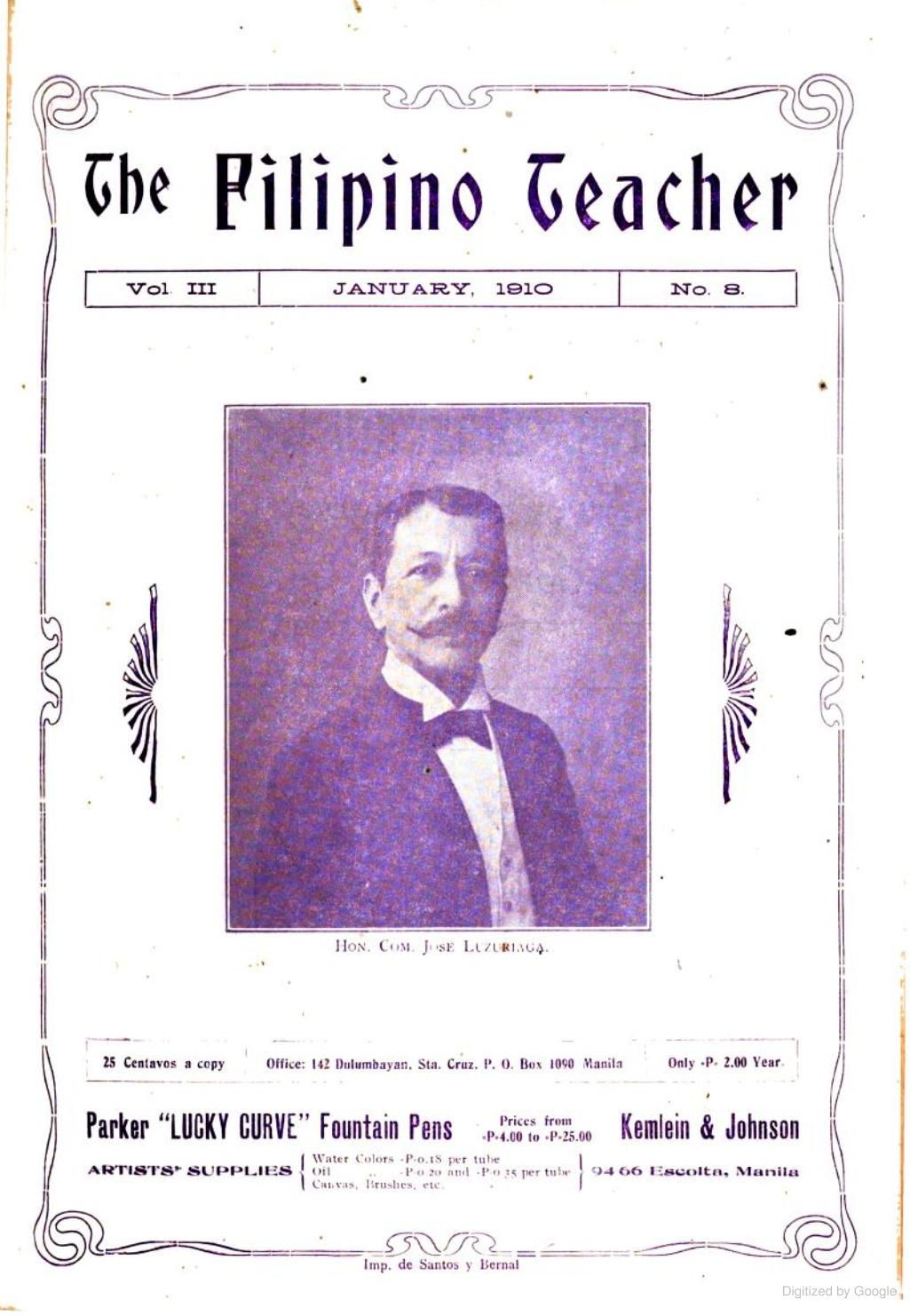
José de Luzuriaga, the 2nd Governor of Negros Occidental

In memory of this event, every November 5 is observed as a special non-working holiday in the province through Republic Act No. 6709, signed by President Corazon Aquino on February 10, 1989.

On November 27, 1898, the Cantonal Republic of Negros unilaterally proclaimed independence, but this was short-lived as the territory became a protectorate of the United States on April 30, 1899. The state was renamed the Republic of Negros (Spanish: República de Negros) on July 22, 1899, and eventually dissolved by the United States and annexed by the U.S. Military Government of the Philippine Islands on April 30, 1901.

The leaders of the short-lived republic were:

- Aniceto Lacson, November 5, 1898 – July 22, 1899 (to November 27, 1898, in Negros Occidental)
- Demetrio Larena, November 24, 1898 – November 27, 1898 (in Negros Oriental)
- President of the Constituent Assembly José Luzuriaga, July 22, 1899 – November 6, 1899
- Secretary of War Juan Araneta
- Civil Governor Melecio Severino, November 6, 1899 – April 30, 1901
- Secretary of Justice Antonio Ledesma Jayme, November 5, 1898 – July 22, 1899

=== Commonwealth period ===
From 1914 to 1927, parts of Western Negros hosted several newly established settlements which became cities connected by railroads constructed to flow towards several "sugar centrals" which were processing the extremely sweet raw sugar canes grown in Negros' volcanic soil and farmed by several "Haciendas". These haciendas littered the countryside as the central sugar mills eventually grew to become full pledged towns and cities: chief among which were Ilog, Hinigaran, La Carlota, Silay, Pulupandan, Bacolod, San Carlos and Bais. Western Negros also saw massive immigration from Panay as the Spanish, Chinese, and French mestizos, plus others, who were serving in the Haciendas imported laborers from Panay island to foster the farming of Negros' sugar plantations and thereby displacing the Cebuano speaking natives. Soon, vast numbers of immigrants from Spain, most of them Basques, became Negros' plantation owners. The east side of Negros was not as thickly settled but became a center of education as on 9 April 1901, the Second Philippine Commission under the chairmanship of William H. Taft arrived in Dumaguete. Weeks later on 1 May, the civil government under American sovereignty was established, and on 28 August, Dr. David S. Hibbard founded what is now Silliman University the first American school in the Philippines and the entire Asian continent with the help of Meliton Larena as the first Mayor of Dumaguete, as well as Demetrio Larena. Thus, Negros is among the most populous islands in the Philippines and also the one with the most number of component cities.

=== Post-Commonwealth era ===
Regions were first formed on September 24, 1972 when the provinces of the Philippines were organized into different 11 regions by Presidential Decree No. 1 as part of the Integrated Reorganization Plan of President Ferdinand Marcos. Negros Occidental was assigned to Western Visayas (Region VI) and Negros Oriental was assigned to Central Visayas (Region VII).

=== Negros famine ===
By the time Ferdinand Marcos' second term began, sugar had become a critical Philippine export, responsible for 27% of the county's total foreign exchange earnings. With international sugar prices rising rapidly through the early 1970s, Marcos decided to put domestic and international sugar trading under government control, first through the Philippine Exchange Co. (Philex), and later through the Philippine Sugar Commission (Philsucom) and its trading arm, the National Sugar Trading Corporation (NASUTRA), which were both controlled by Marcos crony Roberto Benedicto.

However, the international price of sugar eventually crashed, dramatically hurting the livelihoods of poor farmers. The NASUTRA monopoly forced many sugar planters into bankruptcy or deep in debt. In 1984, over 190,000 sugar workers lost their livelihood, and about a million sacadas and their families in Negros suffered in what would later become known as the "Negros Famine."

Author John Silva, who was working with Oxfam at the time, visited Negros and later described the living conditions of thousands of starving and malnourished children:

I drove past the provincial hospital where I first saw hundreds of malnourished children on mats on the floors tended by their mothers, and later, we were in the country through cane fields and small towns remembering the skeletal children being weighed and assessed by our medical team.... There were over 100,000 children in various degree of malnutrition and we started a feeding program for 90,000 of them, hoping to save the worst cases.

The famine in Negros sparked a worldwide firestorm. International relief agencies flew in to conduct feeding programs, local NGOs mobilized relief drives, and members of the Catholic Church pitched in to help.

Locally, social tensions were so high that the Catholic Bishop of Bacolod, Antonio Fortich described the conditions on the island as a "social volcano" ready to explode. This was the situation on September 20, 1985, which marked the date of the Escalante massacre, in which paramilitary forces under the command of Marcos-allied Negros Occidental Governor Armando Gustilo gunned down farmers protesting social conditions on the 13th anniversary of the declaration of Martial Law. Between twenty and thirty farmers were estimated to be killed, and thirty more were wounded.

Another consequence of the famine was the dramatic rise of the Marxist-Leninist-Maoist New People’s Army (NPA) presence on Negros island, with Bishop Fortich stating in 1985 that "the NPA has doubled in strength the last year, principally because of the poverty and hunger here."

=== Negros Island Region ===
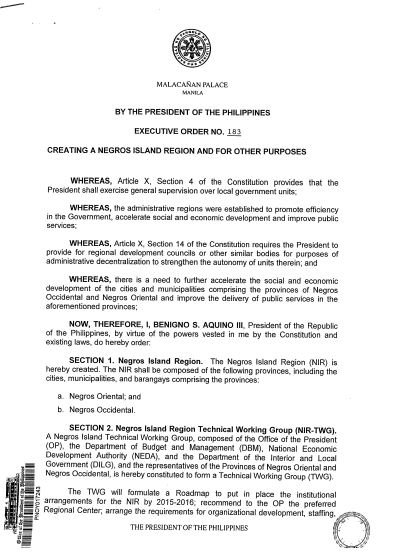
First page of the Executive Order 183 creating Negros Island Region

The movement for a single-island region started in the 1980s when officials of both provinces proposed a one-island, one-region unit. Negros Occidental and Negros Oriental are the only provinces in the Philippines situated in the same island but belonging to two different administrative regions with regional offices located in neighboring Panay and Cebu. The movement to unite the two provinces in Negros island was sustained in the 1990s and 2010s.

The campaign for the creation of a region in Negros had gains when President Benigno Aquino III directed the Department of the Interior and Local Government (DILG) to study the establishment of a new region. with the government agency later endorsing the move. NEDA affirmed by saying that its studies show that the proposed region is economically viable.

On May 29, 2015, President Aquino signed Executive Order 183, which created the Negros Island Region. It separated Negros Occidental and its capital Bacolod from Western Visayas (Region VI) and Negros Oriental from Central Visayas (Region VII) to form the island region, which made the total number of regions of the Philippines into 18.

==== Dissolution and reestablishment ====
On August 9, 2017, President Rodrigo Duterte signed Executive Order No. 38, revoking the Executive Order No. 183 signed by (former) President Benigno Aquino III on May 29 of 2015, due to the reason of the lack of funds to fully establish the NIR according to Benjamin Diokno, the Secretary of Budget and Management. Its dissolution upset the NIR regional officials and provoked strong negative reactions from the Negrenses.

On June 13, 2024, Negros island together with neighboring Siquijor were grouped together under the reestablished Negros Island Region with the signing of Republic Act No. 12000 by President Bongbong Marcos.

== Demographics ==
Population census of Negros
Year	Pop.	±% p.a.
1960	1,751,214	—
1970	2,156,046	+2.10%
1980	2,749,700	+2.46%
1990	3,182,180	+1.47%
1995	3,459,433	+1.58%
2000	3,695,811	+1.43%
2010	4,194,525	+1.27%
2015	4,414,131	+0.98%
2020	4,656,945	+1.13%
2024	4,797,302	+0.72%
Source: Philippine Statistics Authority

== Geography ==
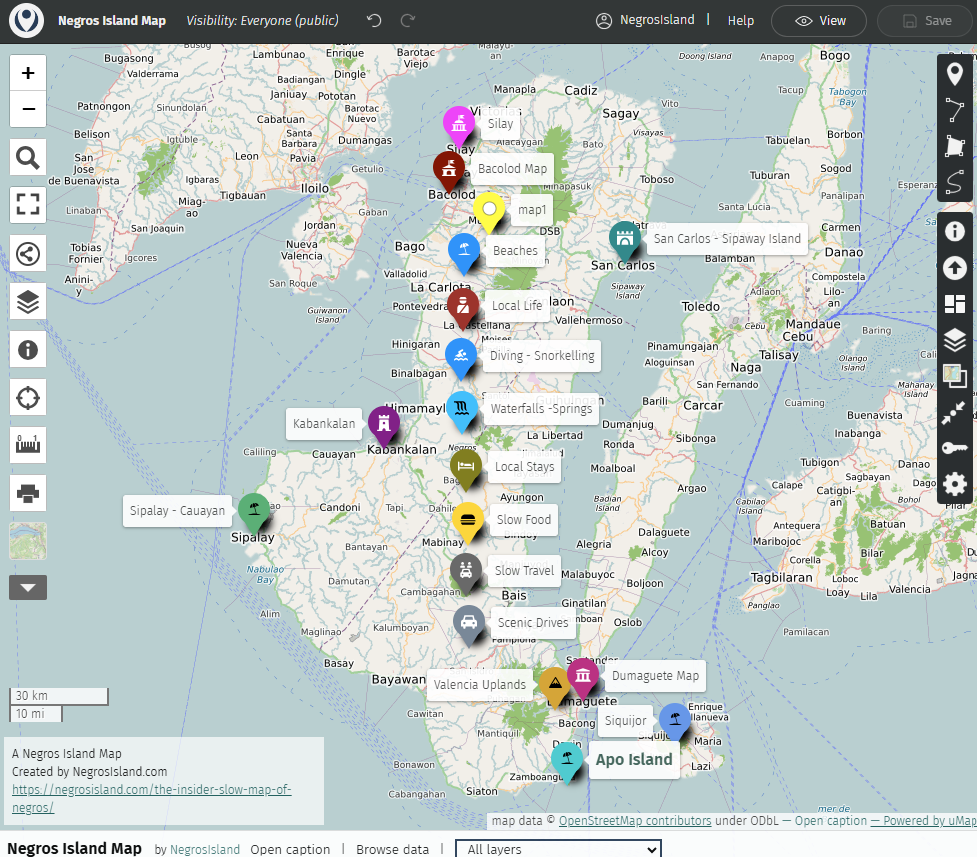
Overview map of Negros Island

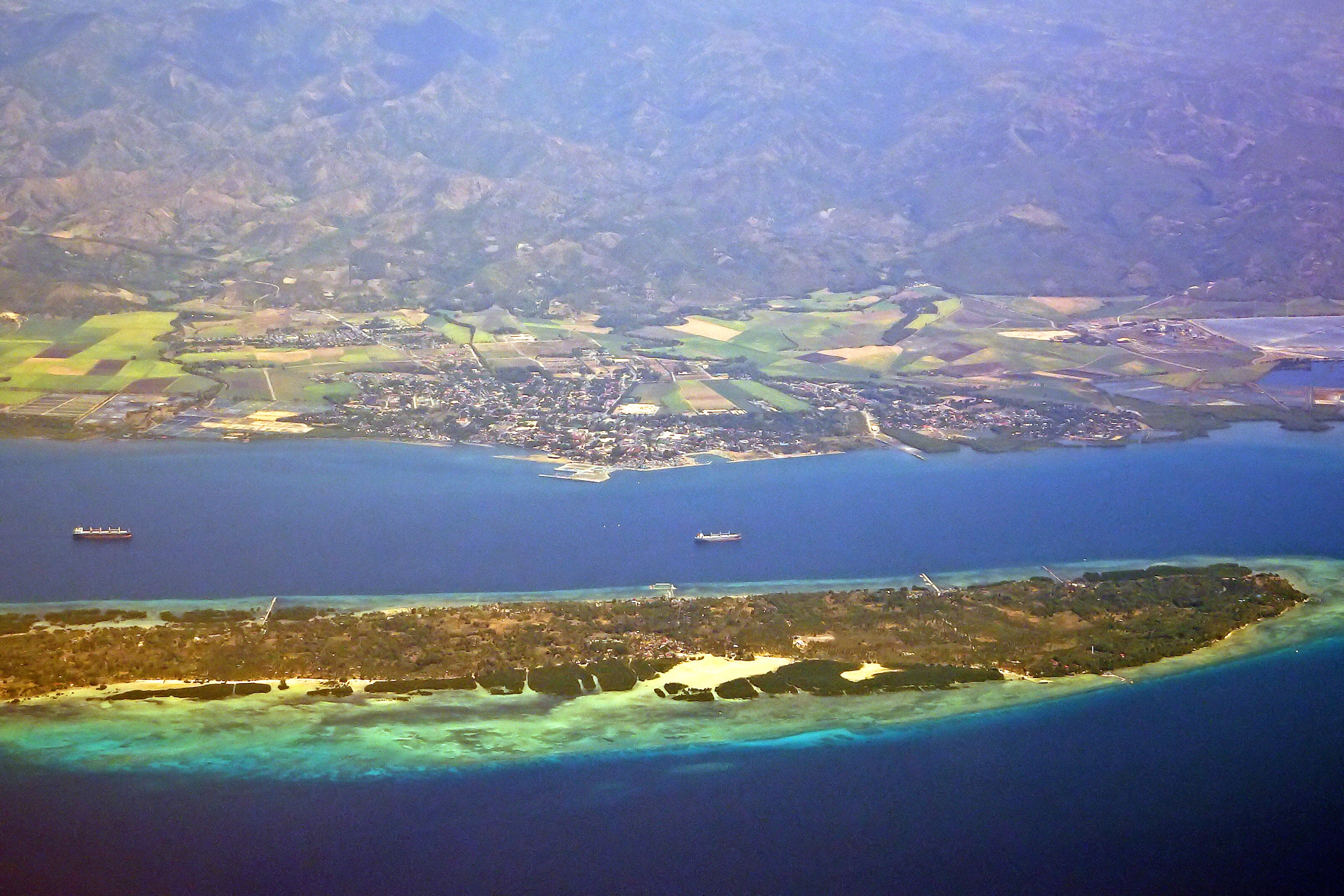
Aerial view of the City of San Carlos, Negros Occidental

Negros is the second largest island in the Visayas (after Samar) and the fourth largest of the Philippines, with a total land area of 13,309.6 square kilometres (5,138.9 sq mi), similar to Flores or Jamaica. It is located between the islands of Panay and Guimaras to the west and Cebu to the east, with Siquijor located on the toe of the island and the islands of Bantayan to the north. Politically and linguistically, Negros is divided into two provinces: Negros Occidental and Negros Oriental.

This division of the island, which roughly follows the mountain range in the center of the island, corresponds to the two related linguistic groups. The western half (Occidental) is home to the Hiligaynon Visayan-speaking population while the eastern half (Oriental) is home to the Cebuano Visayan-speaking population. Together, they are all called Negrenses.

Kanlaon Volcano, located in the central-northern part of the island is the third most-active volcano in the Philippines and overlooks bordering communities and the city of Bacolod to the west. It is the highest peak of the whole island and of the Visayas. Other notable peaks on the island are Mount Silay and Mount Mandalagan in Negros Occidental and Mount Talinis (also known as Cuernos de Negros) in Negros Oriental. There are also lakes that dot the island, among the most notable are the Balinsasayao Twin Lakes in Negros Oriental.

The volcanic activity in Negros is harnessed into electricity through two geothermal power plants in the island. One is located in Palinpinon of Valencia in Negros Oriental and the other is in Mailum of Bago in Negros Occidental, but was eventually shut down.

== Administrative divisions ==
The island of Negros is composed of 2 provinces, 1 highly urbanized city, 19 component cities, 38 municipalities and 1,219 barangays. Prior to the re-establishment of the Negros Island Region, Negros Occidental was designated as part of Western Visayas and Negros Oriental was designated as part of Central Visayas.

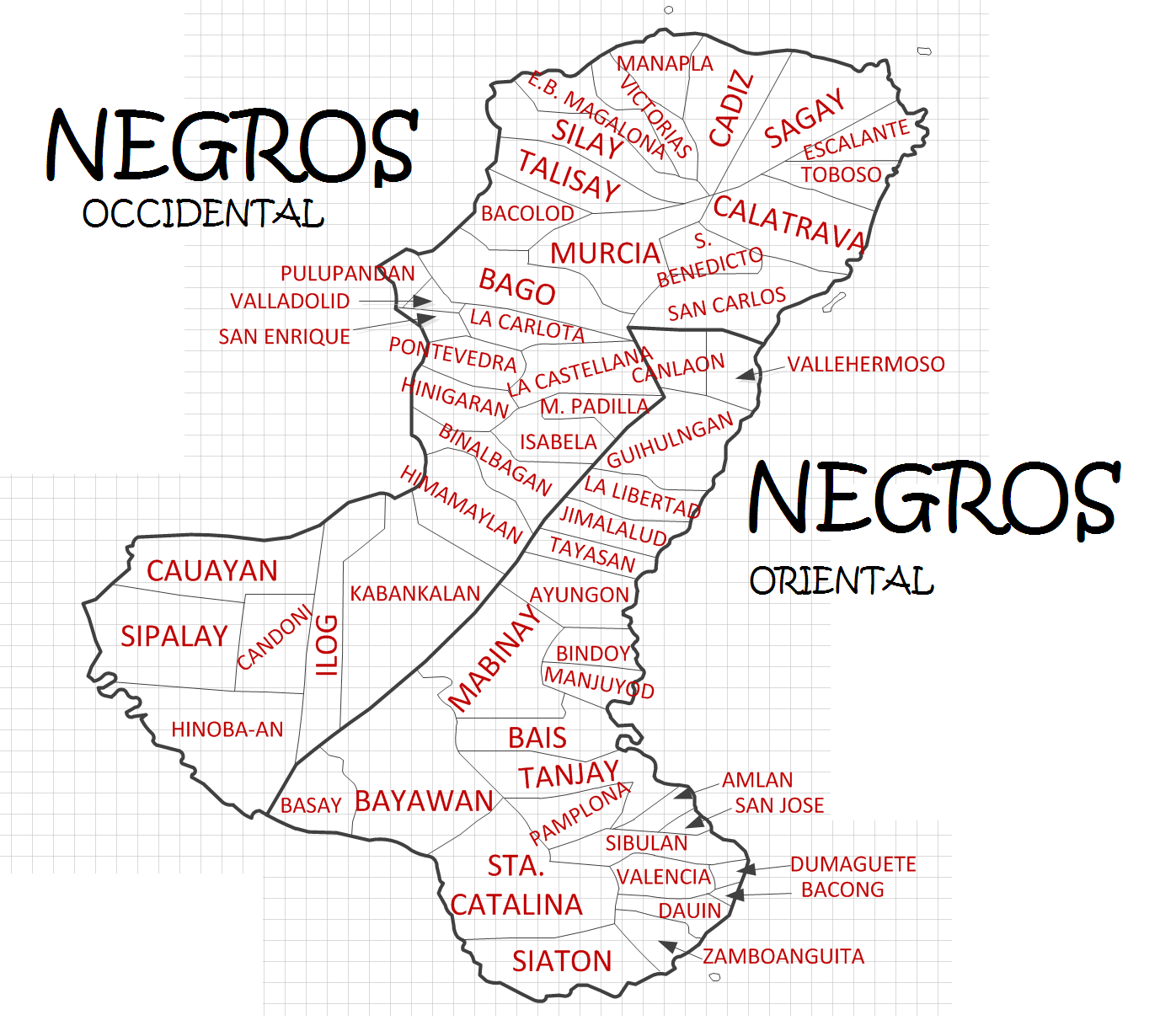
Map of the cities and municipalities in Negros island

Province or HUC		Capital	Population (2015)		Area		Density		Cities	Muni.	Barangay
					km^{2}	sq mi	/km^{2}	/sq mi			
Negros Occidental		Bacolod	56.6%	2,497,261	7,802.54	3,012.58	320	830	12	19	601
Negros Oriental		Dumaguete	30.7%	1,354,995	5,385.53	2,079.36	250	650	6	19	557
Bacolod	†	—	12.7%	561,875	162.67	62.81	3,500	9,100	—	—	61
Total				4,414,131	13,350.74	5,154.75	330	850	19	38	1,219
† Bacolod is a highly urbanized city; figures are excluded from Negros Occidental.

Bacolod is the most populous city on the island and the center of the Bacolod Metropolitan Area (which also contains the cities of Talisay and Silay), as well as the 19th most populous city of the whole Philippines, while Dumaguete is the most densely populated city in the whole region.

Negros Occidental contains 13 cities (12 component and one highly urbanized) and 19 municipalities, which are further subdivided into 601 barangays. It has the most number of chartered cities amongst all the provinces of the Philippines. Although Bacolod serves as the capital, it is governed independently from its corresponding province as a highly urbanized city. Negros Oriental comprises six cities and 19 municipalities, subdivided further into 557 barangays.

City	Population (2015)	Area		Density		City class	Income class	Province
		km^{2}	sq mi	/km^{2}	/sq mi			
Bacolod	561,875	162.67	62.81	3,500	9,100	Highly urbanized	1st	Negros Occidental
Bago	170,981	401.20	154.90	430	1,100	Component	1st	Negros Occidental
Bais	76,291	319.64	123.41	240	620	Component	3rd	Negros Oriental
Bayawan	117,900	699.08	269.92	170	440	Component	1st	Negros Oriental
Cadiz	154,723	524.57	202.54	290	750	Component	1st	Negros Occidental
Canlaon	54,509	170.93	66.00	320	830	Component	4th	Negros Oriental
Dumaguete	131,377	33.62	12.98	3,900	10,000	Component	2nd	Negros Oriental
Escalante	94,070	192.76	74.43	490	1,300	Component	4th	Negros Occidental
Guihulngan	95,969	388.56	150.02	250	650	Component	5th	Negros Oriental
Himamaylan	106,880	367.04	141.71	290	750	Component	3rd	Negros Occidental
Kabankalan	181,977	697.35	269.25	260	670	Component	1st	Negros Occidental
La Carlota	64,469	137.29	53.01	470	1,200	Component	4th	Negros Occidental
Sagay	146,264	330.34	127.54	440	1,100	Component	3rd	Negros Occidental
San Carlos	132,536	451.50	174.33	290	750	Component	1st	Negros Occidental
Silay	126,930	214.80	82.93	590	1,500	Component	3rd	Negros Occidental
Sipalay	70,070	379.78	146.63	180	470	Component	4th	Negros Occidental
Talisay	102,214	201.18	77.68	510	1,300	Component	4th	Negros Occidental
Tanjay	80,532	276.05	106.58	290	750	Component	4th	Negros Oriental
Victorias	87,933	133.92	51.71	660	1,700	Component	1st	Negros Occidental

== Economy ==
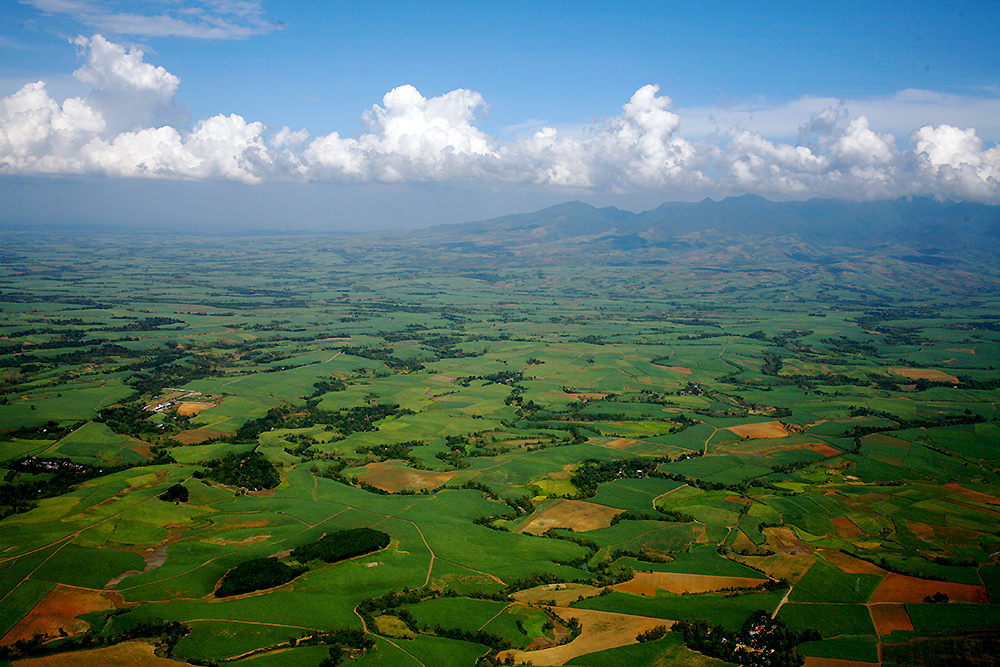
Vast sugarcane plantations near Bacolod

Negros is noted for being the nation's prime producer and exporter of sugar. Sugarcane plantations abound in the agricultural areas of the island. The island also produces cotton and hardwood. Sugar is the biggest industry in the island, followed by organic agricultural products and gamefowl breeding. Its principal sugar-growing region is located in the north and west of the island, stretching from northwest along the coasts of the Visayan Sea and Guimaras Strait, which is one of the nation's principal lowland areas in the Visayas. Negros is now aiming to be the prime producer of organic agricultural produce in Asia.

Sugar refining has many by-products such as acetylene, fertilizers and rum. Fishing is the major industry based in Cadiz. There are also a number of fishponds and prawn farming has become a major industry. Bacolod City is the center of commerce and finance in Negros. It is where oil companies, factories, bottling plants, allied industrial businesses, steel fabrication, power generation, agri-businesses, prawn culture and other aqua-culture ventures are found. By November 2016, Negros generated a total net worth of ₱14.355 billion, placing its provinces among the richest in the country.

== Tourism ==
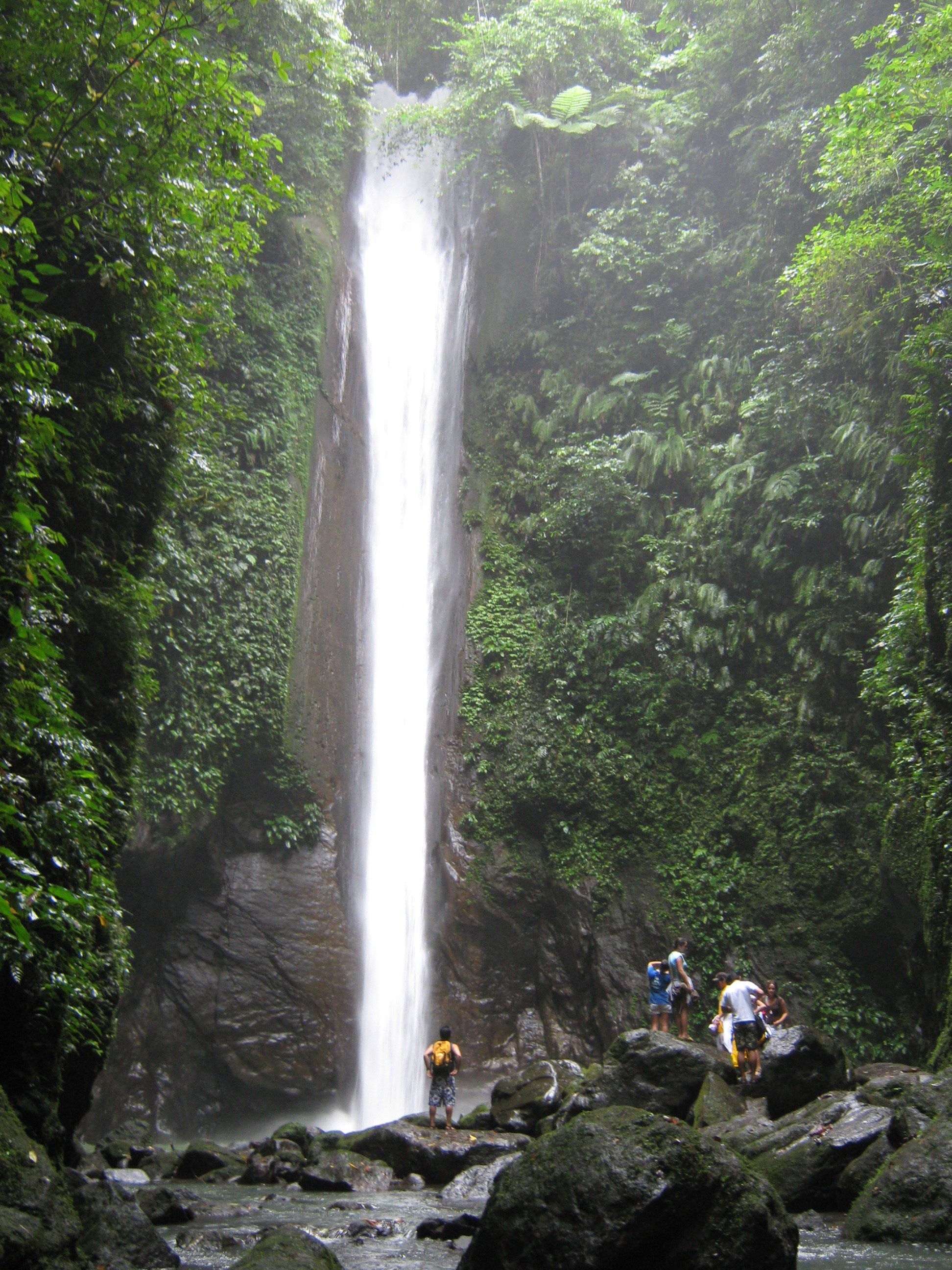
Casaroro Falls in Valencia, Negros Oriental

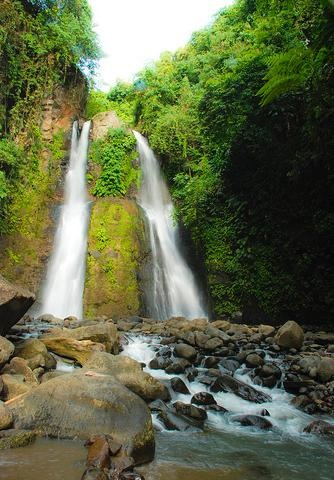
Kipot Falls in Bago, Negros Occidental

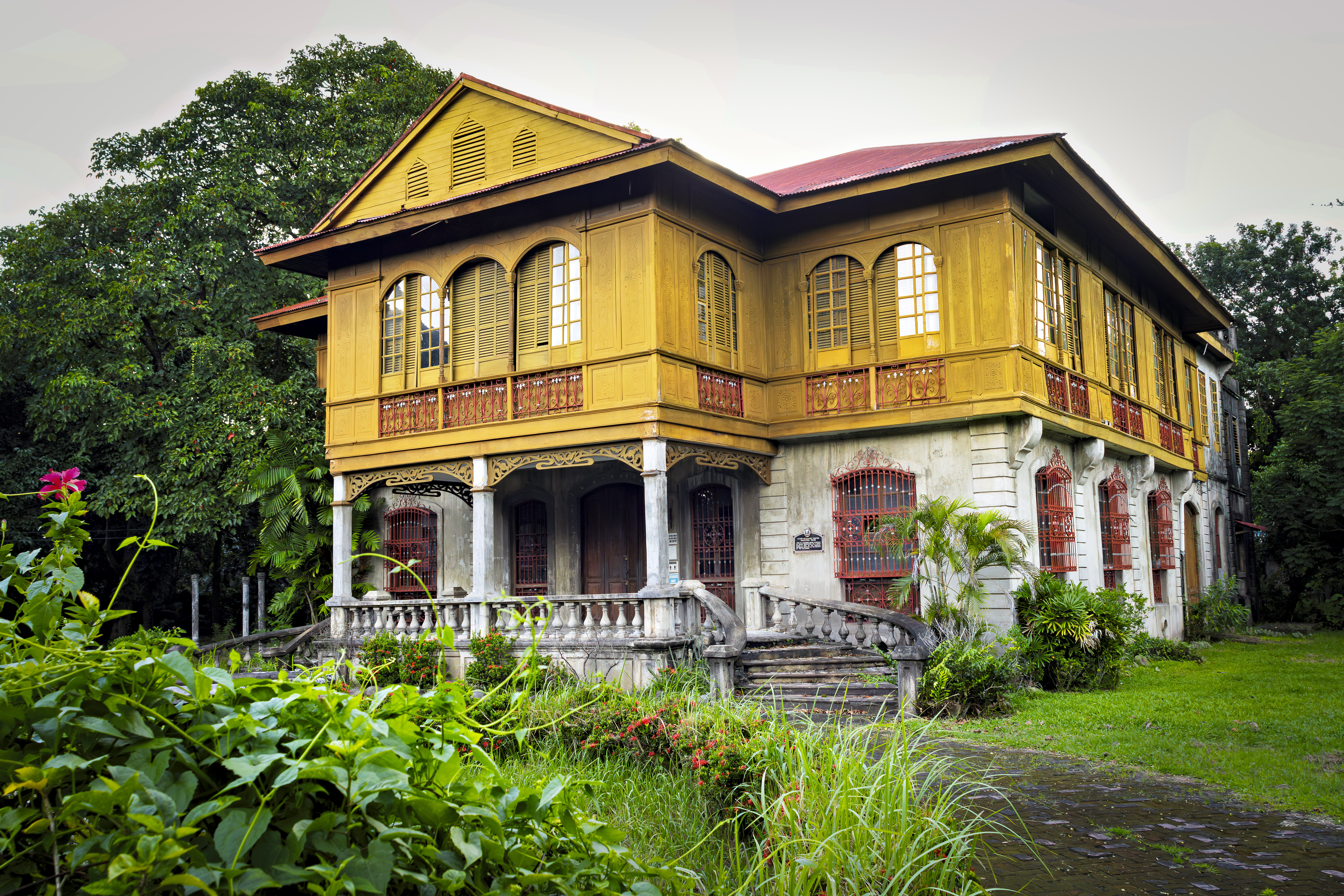
Balay Negrense in Silay City

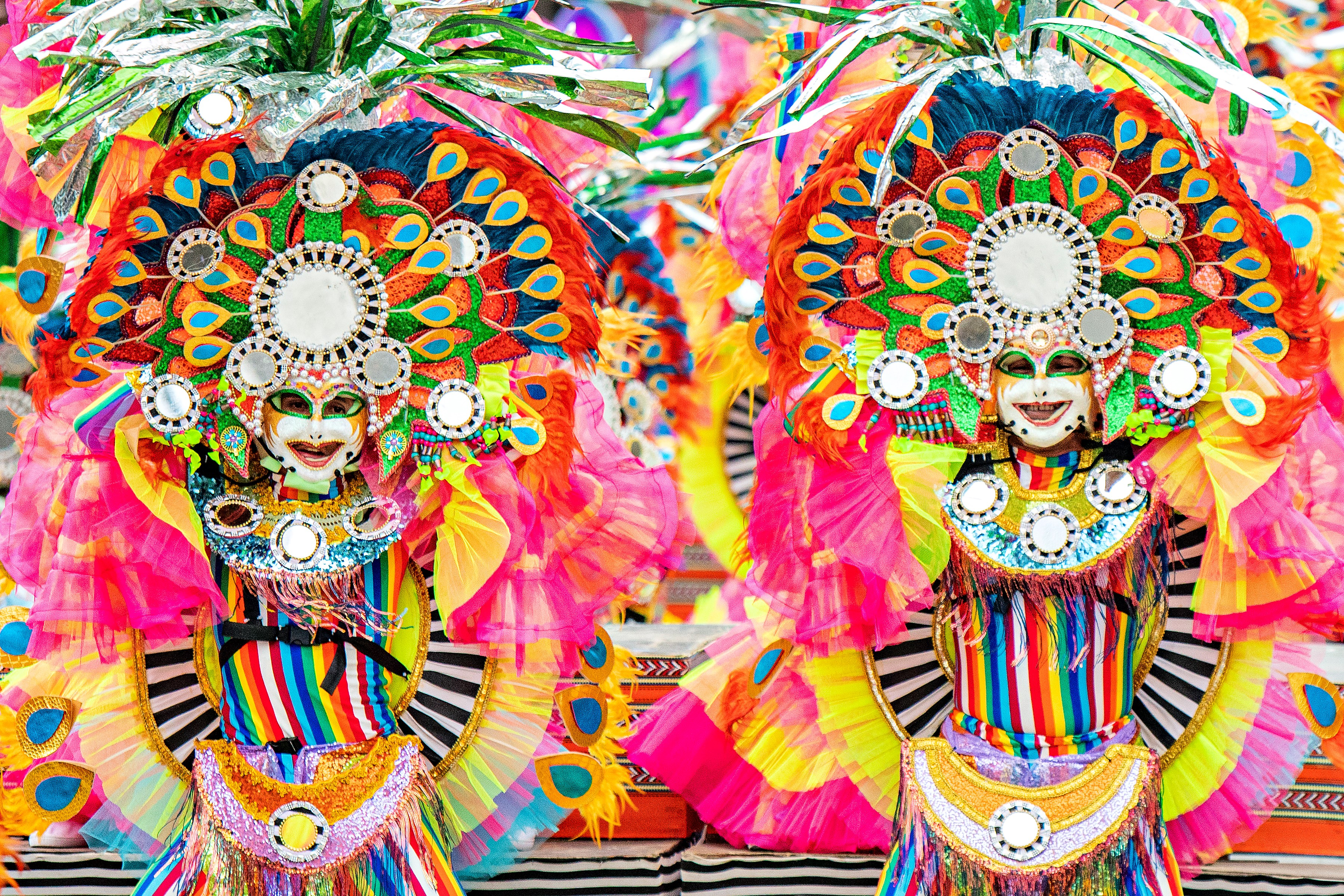
Bacolod City's Masskara Festival

Negros has a lot of tourist attractions. In the city of Silay alone, there are 30 ancestral houses, amongst the most notable is the Balay Negrense. Festivals are also a major tourist attraction in Negros. Among the most notable is the Masskara Festival in the city of Bacolod, which is celebrated during the third week of October, as well as Buglasan Festival in the city of Dumaguete, also held in October. Museums showcase the culture, history and people of Negros, with one example being the Negros Museum, situated behind the Negros Occidental Provincial Capitol Complex. Murcia and Don Salvador Benedicto offer experiences in inland Negros Occidental, the former being known for its Mambukal Resort, while the latter serves as the "Summer Capital of Negros Occidental". Kanlaon Volcano, as well as many other neighbouring peaks, are popular amongst mountain climbers and hikers visiting Negros. The town of Pulupandan, situated in the western tip of Negros, is becoming popular to bird-watching enthusiasts. thanks to its new bird-watching sanctuary.

When it comes to beaches and coastal resorts within the region, the most popular ones are Lakawon Island in Cadiz, Jomabo Island in Escalante, Sipaway/Refugio Island in the city of San Carlos, Sipalay, Hinoba-an and Manjuyod's sand bar. The top attractions in Cauayan are the Punta Bulata White Beach Resort and Danjugan Island, which serves as a major diving spot in Negros Occidental. Also, a marine reserve is established in Sagay City, which protects the marine life and reefs of Carbin and Maca, making it a popular draw for marine life enthusiasts. Dauin is known for its beach resorts and Apo Island, a famous diving spot and marine reserve in Negros Oriental. The city of Dumaguete is popular amongst students, largely because of its presence as a university city in the region. Bais has since then become a tourist spot for whale and dolphin watching, due to its coastline touching the Tañon Strait. Antulang Beach Resort and Tambobo Bay, as well as the inland Lake Balanan serve as three important attractions in the town of Siaton. Situated within the towns of Sibulan, San Jose and Valencia is the Balinsasayao Twin Lakes Natural Park, which serves as an important draw for tourists going to inland Negros Oriental.

== Transportation ==
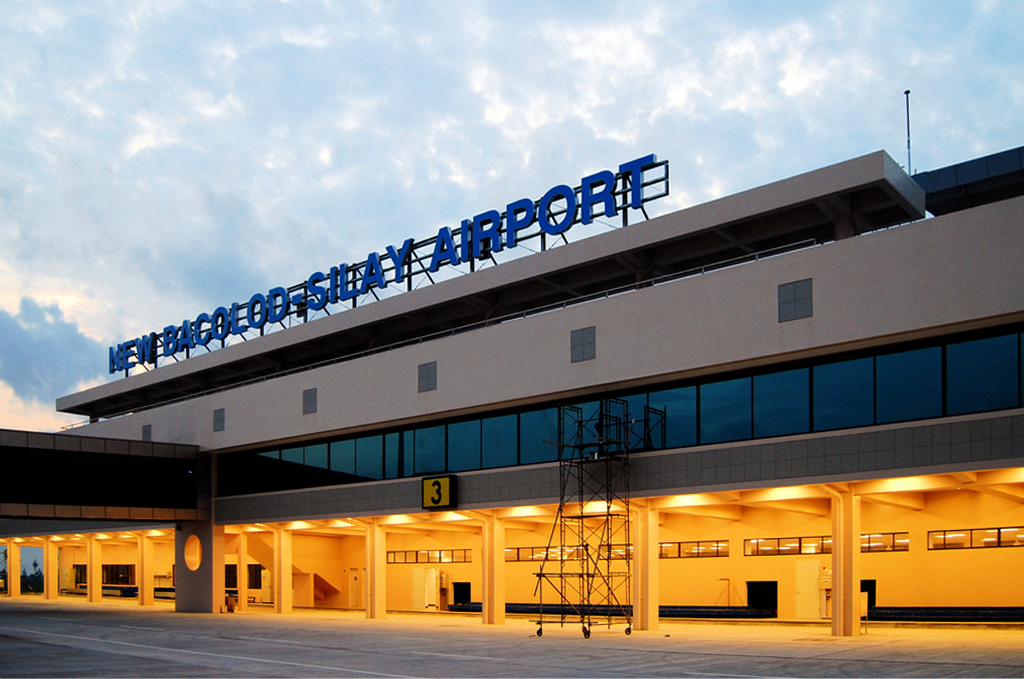
Exterior of Bacolod-Silay Airport

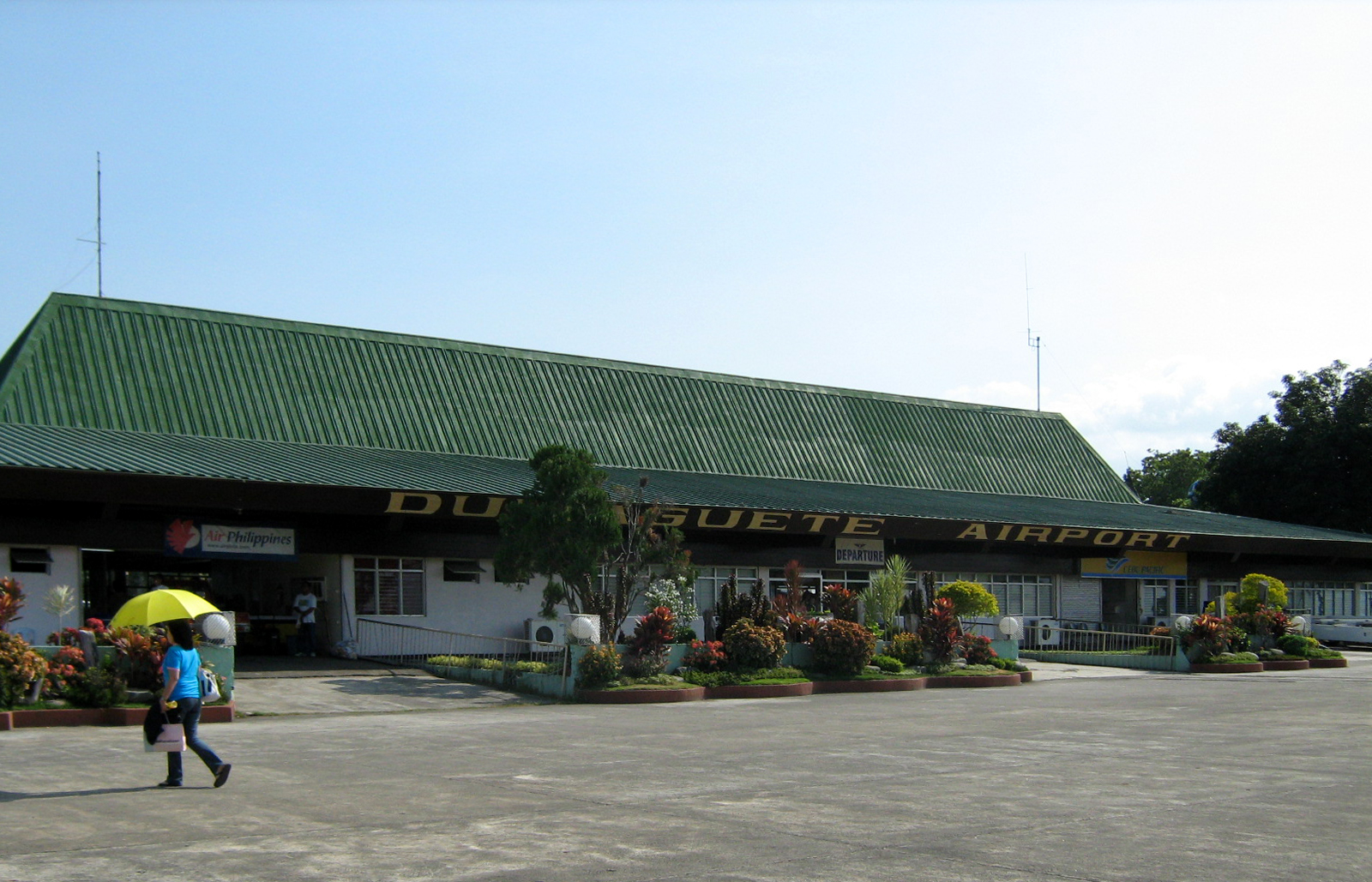
Exterior of Dumaguete-Sibulan Airport

Both provinces of Negros are interconnected by major inter-provincial roads. In Bacolod, there are two main roads, namely Lacson Street to the north and Araneta Street to the south. Cities, especially the provincial capitals of Bacolod and Dumaguete, are being served by jeepneys and taxis. Tricycles are mainly used for short-distance travel, and is common in city barangays, smaller cities and towns. Bus stations are present in major cities and towns within the region. Vallacar Transit Corporation, which operates the Ceres buses, serves the whole island of Negros. There are regularly scheduled fast ferry and roll-on/roll-off services for the island region's coastal cities and towns.

=== Airports ===
Currently, there are two airports serving Negros island. The Bacolod-Silay International Airport, located in the city of Silay, serves the general area of Bacolod Metropolitan Area, and is expected to become the primary international gateway to Negros. The Dumaguete-Sibulan Airport, located in the town of Sibulan, serves the general area of Dumaguete and its neighbouring towns. However, a new airport is being planned to be constructed in the town of Bacong, south of Dumaguete, to replace the older airport in Sibulan.

==== International ====
- Bacolod-Silay International Airport

==== Domestic ====
- Dumaguete-Sibulan Airport
- Kabankalan Airport (under construction)
- Sipalay Airport

== Energy ==
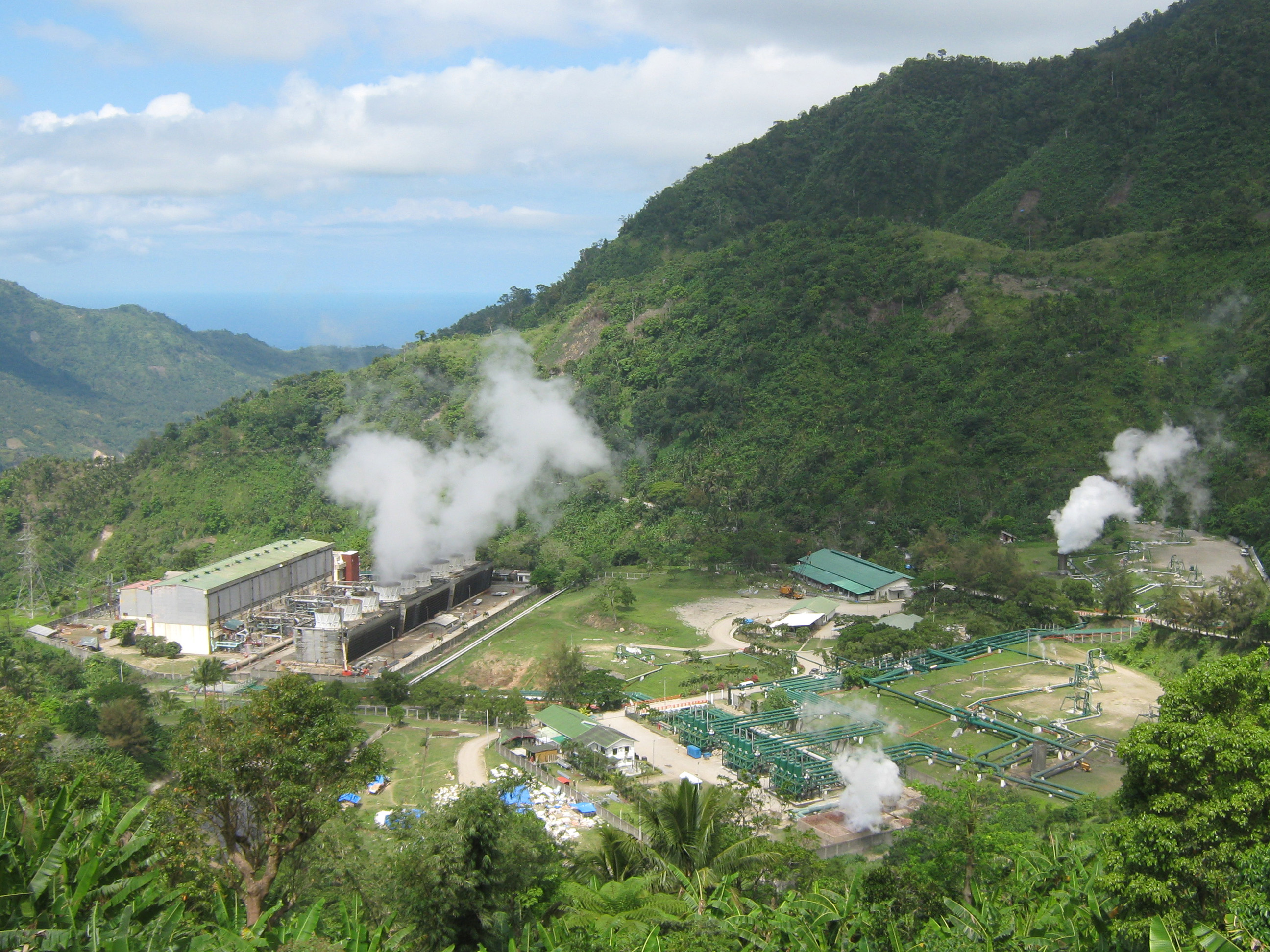
The Palinpinon Geothermal Power Plant

The island is known for using geothermal energy to provide electricity for its inhabitants. In San Carlos, Negros Occidental where energy company San Carlos Solar Energy (SaCaSol) is located, solar energy is being used to power the city and surrounding municipalities. Inland towns and cities of Negros uses hydroelectric power acquired from springs, rivers and waterfalls. Due to the island region's sugarcane-based agriculture, Negros may become the nation's major biofuel producer, with sugarcane being used for ethanol production.

== Endangered species ==
An illustration of the possibly extinct Negros fruit dove which has not been seen since 1954

Negros, like the Central Philippines (Visayas) overall, is generally recognized as a top priority area for wildlife conservation, both in terms of numbers of endemic species and severity of threat. More than half of the critically endangered species listed in the Philippines occur in Negros. It is the most threatened area of the Philippines, since it has the least remaining forest cover with just an estimated 3% remaining. It has the highest numbers of severely threatened endemic species and subspecies. Mt. Silay and Mt. Mandalagan are the two mountain peaks in the Northern Negros Natural Park. These mountains have the last remaining old-growth forests.

Negros shares a lot of its fauna with Panay. Due to high amounts of deforestation most of these Western Visayan endemics are threatened. These include the white-winged cuckooshrike, Visayan flowerpecker, flame-templed babbler, writhed-billed hornbill, Visayan tarictic hornbill, Negros bleeding-heart pigeon, Visayan rhabdornis, Negros scops owl, Visayan spotted deer and Visayan warty pig The Negros striped babbler and the possibly extinct Negros fruit dove are only found on the island and nowhere else. Other threatened species include Blue-backed parrot, Pinsker's hawk-eagle, Pink-bellied imperial pigeon, Green-faced parrotfinch and the possibly extinct subspecies of Celestial monarch and Spotted imperial pigeon.

== See also ==
- List of Cultural Properties of the Philippines in Negros
- Negros Island Region
