= Sibulan Airport =

Airport serving Dumaguete, Negros Oriental, Philippines

Sibulan Airport Tugpahanan sa Sibulan Paliparan ng Sibulan
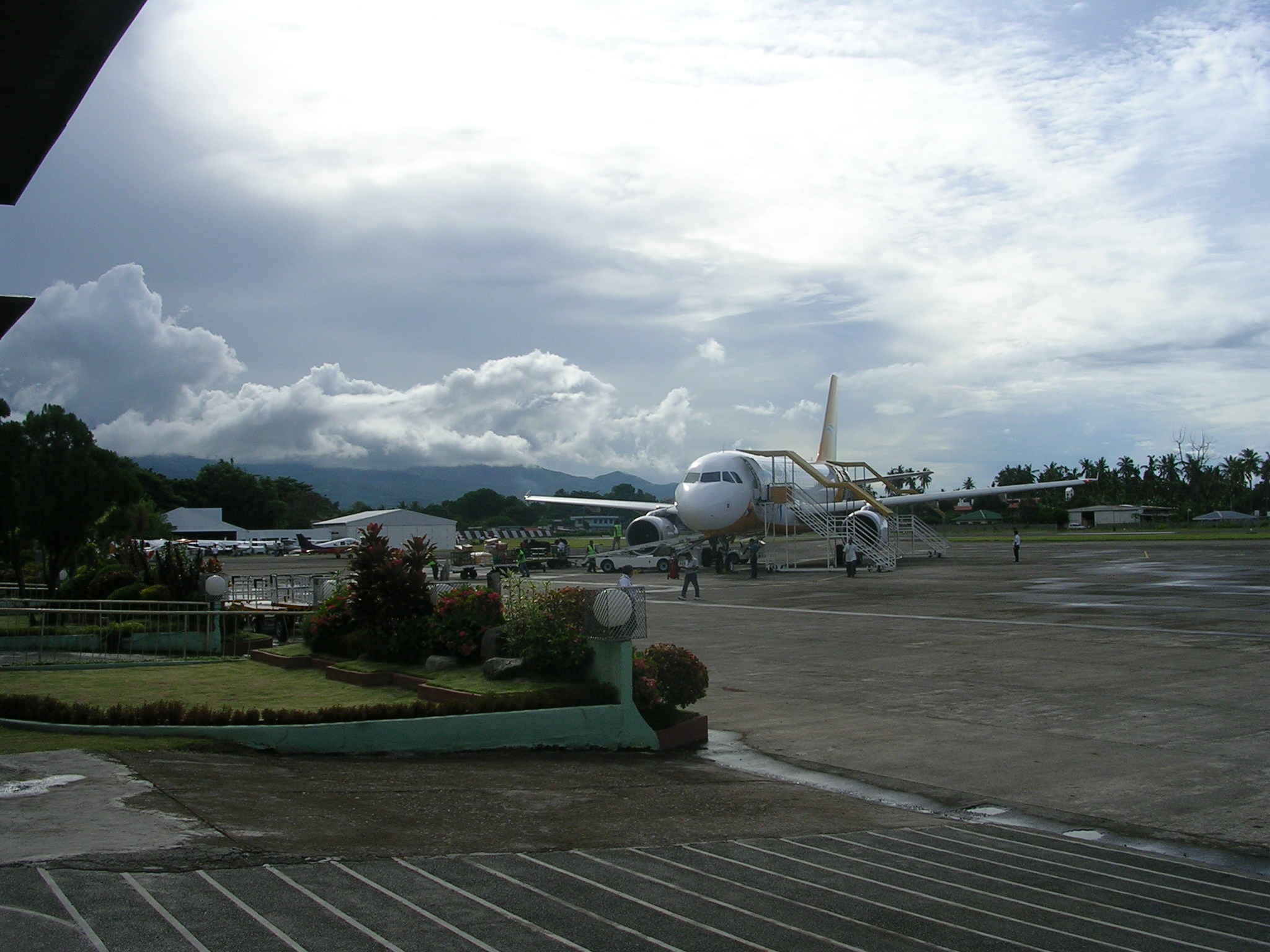
- IATA: DGT; ICAO: RPVD; WMO: 98642

Summary
- Airport type: Public
- Owner/Operator: Civil Aviation Authority of the Philippines
- Serves: Dumaguete
- Location: Sibulan, Negros Oriental, Philippines
- Elevation AMSL: 5 m (16 ft)
- Coordinates: 09°20′03″N 123°18′04″E

Map
- Location within Visayas Location within Philippines

Runways
Direction	Length		Surface
Direction	m	ft	Surface
09/27 (Note: Runway 09 is 1,435 meters (4,708 ft) long with a displaced threshold of 410 meters (1,350 ft).)	1,845	6,053	Asphalt

Statistics (2023)
- Passengers: 650,831 (2023)
- Aircraft movements: 5062 (2023)
- Cargo (in kgs): 2,836,149
- Source: CAAP

Sibulan Airport (IATA: DGT, ICAO: RPVD), also known as Dumaguete Airport or Dumaguete–Sibulan Airport, is an airport serving the general area of the city of Dumaguete, located in the province of Negros Oriental in the Philippines. It is located 3 kilometers (1.9 mi) north of Dumaguete on a 63-hectare (160-acre) site in Barangay Agan-an in the nearby municipality of Sibulan. The airport is one of two major airports serving Negros Island, the other being Bacolod–Silay Airport in Silay, Negros Occidental.

The airport is classified as a Class 1 principal (major domestic) airport by the Civil Aviation Authority of the Philippines, the body of the Department of Transportation that is responsible for the operations of not only this airport but also of all other airports in the Philippines except the major international airports.

== History ==
The airport was built by the Philippine government with supervision and guidance from the United States Army Air Corps in 1938. The runway, running in a north–south direction, was completed in March 1939 and was used by civilian and military aircraft. During the Japanese occupation of the Philippines as part of the Second World War, in 1942, two parallel runways running in an east–west direction were constructed. The northern runway was used as the main runway while the southern runway was a secondary (auxiliary) runway. By 1945, the airfield was liberated by the U.S. Army. The present-day runway was then extended to the current dimensions.

In 2017, the air traffic control system was upgraded, and new navigational equipment were installed, making the airport capable of handling night operations. Cebu Pacific became the first airline to operate night flights to the airport in July of that year.

On 11 March 2021, after upgrade works were made, then-President Rodrigo Duterte inaugurated the newly-expanded airport. The upgrades covered the pavement reconstruction, expansion of the terminal building from 1,152 square meters (12,400 sq ft) to 1,842-square-meter (19,830 sq ft), and expansion of CAAP administrative buildings.

=== Future development ===
Studies conducted by the Japan International Cooperation Agency and the Korea International Cooperation Agency concluded that expanding the airport at its current site is not feasible. Since 2014, lawmakers have thus been proposing to transfer the airport to the town of Bacong, south of Dumaguete City. Although there were proposals to build the airport in the nearby cities of Bais and Tanjay and the municipality of Siaton, Bacong was the most preferred due to its use for constructing a northeast–southwest runway, which planes can land and take off in that direction, and its safety-oriented location ideal for future expansion. Moreover, the east–west direction of the Sibulan Airport runway as well as the prevalence of crosswinds was dangerous for planes landing and taking off.

== Airlines and destinations ==
Airlines	Destinations
Cebgo	Cebu
Cebu Pacific	Manila
PAL Express	Manila
Royhle Air Way	Charters: Dipolog, Siquijor
