= Negros (province) =

Former province in the Philippines

- Military district of the Philippines (1734–1865); Politico-military province of the Philippines (1865–1890)
- 1734–1890
- Location of the historical politico-military province of Negros.
- Capital: Capitals during both its military district and politico-military province status: Ilog (1734–1795); Himamaylan (1795–1849); Bacolod (1849–1890)
- History
  - Established: 1734
  - Disestablished: January 1 1890
Preceded by	Succeeded by
Oton	Occidental Negros; Oriental Negros
- Today part of: Negros Occidental; Negros Oriental

Negros was an administrative division of the Philippines, existing as a military district from 1734 to 1865, and a politico-military province from 1865 to 1890.

== History ==
Upon the arrival of the Spaniards, Miguel López de Legazpi placed the island of Negros (then known as "Buglas") and its nearby islands and islets under the jurisdiction of the governor of Oton on Panay (then the Alcaldía de Otón, predecessor of the province of Iloilo) in the 1600s. The islands then became a Spanish military district in 1734 and the municipality of Ilog served as its first capital.

The seat of government was later transferred to Himamaylan in 1795 until Bacolod became the capital in 1849. In 1865, it was raised into a politico-military province.

The province was composed of 2 geographical divisions: Occidental Negros (the de jure and de facto seat of the government) and Oriental Negros. All of the three aforementioned towns which were designated as capitals, including those during its military district status prior to being a province, are part of Occidental Negros.

== Official divisions ==
On January 1, 1890, the island was officially partitioned, turning Occidental Negros and Oriental Negros into separate regular provinces through a royal decree executed by Governor General Valeriano Weyler.

Occidental Negros retained Bacolod as its capital, while Oriental Negros made Dumaguete as its capital. After the Negros Revolution, the two provinces were briefly united as an independent Republic of Negros in November 5 of 1898, until May 1 of 1901, when Occidental Negros and Oriental Negros were annexed under the Insular Government of the United States of America through Acts No. 119 and 120 respectively which was enacted on April 20, 1901, as with the rest of the country, and later under the Government of the Commonwealth of the Philippines.

The island of Siquijor (then under the politico-military province of Bohol) was then made a "sub-province" of Oriental Negros on October 8, 1907, through Act No. 1753. On March 10, 1917, both Occidental Negros and Oriental Negros became provinces under the American civil government through Act 2711.

After years of liberation from foreign forces, Siquijor was separated from Oriental Negros and became a regular province on November 11, 1971, by Republic Act No. 6398 which was approved on September 17, 1971.

Later on, both Negros provinces, Occidental Negros and Oriental Negros were then renamed into their present names of Negros Occidental and Negros Oriental.

== See also ==
- Negros Island
- Republic of Negros
- Negros Occidental
- Negros Oriental
