= Magahat language =

Central Philippine language

Magahat
- Southern Binukidnon
- Native to: Philippines
- Region: Negros Oriental
- Ethnicity: Negrense
- Native speakers: (7,600 cited 2000)
- Language family: Austronesian: Malayo-Polynesian; Philippine; Central Philippine; Bisayan; Magahat

Language codes
- ISO 639-3: mtw
- Glottolog: maga1264

Magahat, also called Southern Binukidnon or Buglas Bukidnon, is a Central Philippine language of the mountains of Negros in the Philippines that has been strongly influenced by Cebuano and Hiligaynon. It is similar to Karolanos; Lobel (2013) suggests that it is a Bisayan language.

== Demographics ==
Oracion (1974) reported a Magahat population of just under 400 people in Basay, Negros Oriental. Dantes (2015) reported a Magahat population of 2,478 individuals.

According to the Ethnologue, Magahat is spoken in the Mount Arniyo area near Bayawan, upper Tayaban, Tanjay, Santa Catalina, and Siaton municipalities in southern Negros Oriental Province, located just west of Dumaguete.

== Sound changes ==
Lobel (2013: 39, 249, 273) reports that Southern Binukidnon is a Bisayan language that has some uncommon phonological features, including the preservation of Proto-Malayo-Polynesian *-h in coda positions.
