= Karolanos language =

Austronesian language

Karolanos
- Carolan, Northern Binukidnon
- Native to: Philippines
- Region: Negros Occidental
- Ethnicity: Negrense
- Native speakers: (15,000 cited 2000)
- Language family: Austronesian: Malayo-Polynesian; Philippine; Central Philippine; Bisayan; Karolanos

Language codes
- ISO 639-3: kyn
- Glottolog: karo1299

Karolanos, also known as Carolan (Karul·an) or Northern Binukidnon, is a Bisayan language spoken in Kabankalan, Negros Occidental by the Negrense descendants of the indigenous Carolan people.
