= Governor of Siquijor =

Local chief executive

- Gobernador ng Lalawigan ng Siquijor
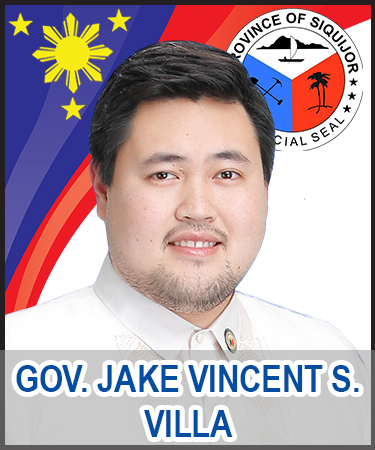
- Incumbent; Jake Vincent Villa since June 30, 2022
- Style: The Honorable
- Seat: Siquijor Provincial Capitol, Siquijor, Siquijor
- Term length: 3 years, renewable maximum not eligible for re-election immediately after three consecutive terms
- Inaugural holder: James Fugate (de facto, as Lt. Governor of Siquijor); Eulogio M. Omictin Jr. (de jure, first elected Provincial Governor)
- Formation: September 17, 1971
- Deputy: Vice Governor

The governor of Siquijor is the local chief executive and head of the Provincial Government of Siquijor in the Philippines. Along with the governors of Negros Occidental and Negros Oriental, the province's chief executive is a member of the Regional Development Council of the Negros Island Region.

== History ==
From 1901 - 1971, the chief executive of the Siquijor subprovince was the Lieutenant governor reporting under the civil governor of Negros Oriental.

On July 18, 1966, although Siquijor was still a subprovince, Lt. Governor designation was changed to Governor through Republic Act No. 4851.

On September 17, 1971, Siquijor became an independent province through Republic Act No. 6398. Subsequently, the first provincial election was held on November 8, 1971.

== List of governors of Siquijor ==
Governors of Siquijor

1. LIEUTENANT GOVERNORS (1901 – 1966)
No.	Image	Name	Term	Origin	Note(s)
1		James R. Fugate	1901 – 1913	California	first Lieutenant-Governor of sub-province assigned by Governor-General William Howard Taft. Former scout sergeant of California Volunteers of U.S. Infantry.
2		Pablo Bueno	1914 – 1916	Dumaguete	first elected Filipino Lieutenant-Governor.
3		Tomas Padayhag	1916 – 1924	Larena (Canaon)	first elected native Lieutenant-Governor.
4		Vicente Villanueva	1924 – 1928	Enrique Villanueva (Talingting)	Elected.
5		Marcial Pal-ing	1928 – 1932	Enrique Villanueva	Elected.
6		Sergio Jumawan	1932 – 1938	Siquijor	Elected.
7		Nicolas R. Parami	1938 – 1942	Lazi	Elected.
8		Sebastian Monera	1943 – 1944	San Juan	appointed by Japanese Imperial Forces and later executed by presumed guerilla
9		Iluminado Jumawan	1944 –	Siquijor	Appointed by USAFFE. Died in a vehicular accident.
10		Baldomero Samson	1944 – 1946	Maria	Appointed by USAFFE.
—		Marcial Pal-ing	1946–1951	Enrique Villanueva	Elected for second term.
11		Eulogio M. Omictin Jr.	1951–1966	Larena	Elected

2. THIRD PHILIPPINE REPUBLIC (1966 - 1978)
No.	Image	Name	Term	Origin	Note(s)
1		Eulogio M. Omictin Jr.	July 18, 1966– September 17, 1971	Larena	Designation was changed from Lt. Governor to Governor of subprovince.
1		Eulogio M. Omictin Jr.	September 17, 1971 - December 31, 1971	Larena	Siquijor became an independent province. First official Governor of the province.
1		Eulogio M. Omictin Jr.	January 1, 1972 - June 12, 1978	Larena	First elected Governor.

3. FOURTH PHILIPPINE REPUBLIC (1978-1986)
No.	Image	Name	Term	Origin	Note(s)
2		Manolito D. Asok	June 12, 1978 – June 30, 1980	Maria	Elected.
2		Manolito D. Asok	June 30, 1980 – June 30, 1984	Maria	Reelected. Later elected first assemblyman of Siquijor for Regular Batasang Pambansa
3		Lucito Balanay	June 30, 1984 - March 15, 1986	Siquijor	Former vice-governor and succeeded governor Asok when the latter was elected assemblyman

4. FIFTH PHILIPPINE REPUBLIC (1986–present)
No.	Image	Name	Term	Origin	Note(s)
4		Orlando Bongcawel Fua Sr.	March 16, 1986 - June 30, 1987	Lazi	Appointed by President Corazon C. Aquino. Later became the first elected congressman of lone district of the province.
5		Benjamin P. Aquino	June 30, 1987 - June 30, 1995	Enrique Villanueva	Elected twice.
—		Lucito Balanay	June 30, 1995 - June 30, 1998	Siquijor	Elected for his second term.
—		Orlando Bongcawel Fua Sr.	June 30, 1998 - June 30, 2007	Lazi	Elected for 3 consecutive terms.
6		Orlando Anoos Fua Jr.	June 30, 2007 - June 30, 2013	Lazi	Elected for 2 consecutive terms.
7		Zaldy Samson Villa	June 30, 2013 - June 30, 2022	Larena	Elected for 3 consecutive terms.
8		Jake Vincent; Sarmiento Villa	June 30, 2022 – present	Larena	Incumbent
