= 2025 Siquijor local elections =

Local election in the Philippines

2025 Siquijor gubernatorial election
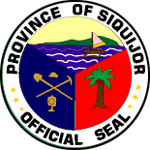
- May 12, 2025
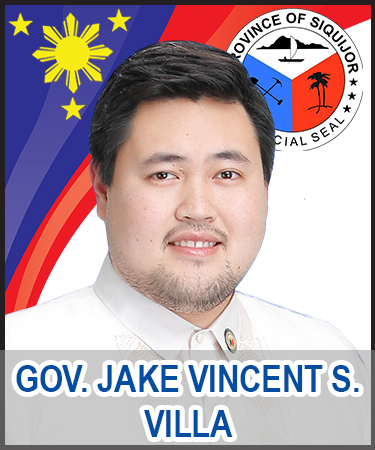
		AKSYON
Nominee	Jake Vincent Villa	Nale Vincent Masayon
Party	PFP	Aksyon
Running mate	Dindo Tumala	Dean Villa
Popular vote	42,149	30,529
Percentage	56.38%	40.84%
Governor before election
Jake Vincent Villa
NPC
Elected Governor
Jake Vincent Villa
PFP

Local elections in Siquijor were held on May 12, 2025 as part of the 2025 Philippine general election. Voters will elect all local posts in the province: town mayors, vice mayors, town councilors, as well as members of the Sangguniang Panlalawigan - three in each of the province's two administrative districts, the governor, vice governor, and one representative for lone district of Siquijor.

The province's election turnout is 91.84%, equivalent to 74,758 out of 81,404 total registered voters.

== Provincial elections ==
=== Governor ===
Jake Vincent Villa is the incumbent.

Siquijor gubernatorial election
Party	Candidate	Votes	%
PFP	Jake Vincent Villa	42,149	56.38%
Aksyon	Nale Vincent Masayon	30,529	40.84%
Valid ballots		72,678	97.22%
Invalid or blank votes		2,080	2.78%
Total votes		74,758	100.00%

=== Vice-Governor ===
Mei Ling Quezon-Brown is the incumbent but term-limited. She is now running for lone district representative.

Siquijor vice-gubernatorial election
Party	Candidate	Votes	%
PFP	Dindo Tumala	40,684	54.42%
Aksyon	Dean Villa	29,950	40.06%
Valid ballots		70,634	94.48%
Invalid or blank votes		4,124	5.52%
Total votes		74,758	100.00%

=== Sangguniang Panlalawigan ===
==== 1st District (North) ====
- Municipalities: Enrique Villanueva, Larena, Siquijor
- Population (2020): 50,159
- Electorate (2022): 39,184
- Turnout (2022): 34,346 (87.65%)

Parties are as stated in their certificates of candidacy.

Siquijor 1st District Sangguniang Panlalawigan elections
Party	Candidate	Votes	%
PFP	Brylle Deeiah Tumarong-Quio	19,948	12.27%
PFP	Teodoro Jumawan Jr.	19,208	11.82%
PFP	Rene Franciso Woo	18,201	11.20%
PFP	Erson Digal	17,036	10.48%
Aksyon	Andresito Cortes	16,452	10.12%
Aksyon	Jamel Patrick Royo	13,973	8.60%
Aksyon	Marlon Padayhag	13,332	8.20%
Valid ballots		29,538	72.69%
Invalid or blank votes		11,097	27.31%
Total votes		40,635	100.00%

==== 2nd District (South) ====
- Municipalities: Maria, Lazi, San Juan
- Population (2020): 53,236
- Electorate (2022): 43,406
- Turnout (2022): 38,369 (88.40%)

Parties are as stated in their certificates of candidacy.

Siquijor 2nd District Sangguniang Panlalawigan elections
Party	Candidate	Votes	%
PFP	Ed Mark Baroy	19,896	12.20%
PFP	Rommel Dimagnaong	19,872	12.19%
PFP	Irving Vios	18,527	11.36%
PFP	Heddah Largo	16,141	9.90%
Aksyon	Orville Fua	13,320	8.17%
Aksyon	Shirley Ligutom	11,797	7.23%
Aksyon	Edwin Quimno	11,143	6.83%
Valid ballots		27,674	67.88%
Invalid or blank votes		13,095	32.12%
Total votes		40,769	100.00%

== Congressional election ==
- Population (2020): 103,395
- Electorate (2022): 78,458 (162 election returns)
- Turnout (2022): 69,103 (88.08%)

Zaly Villa is the incumbent.

Philippine House of Representatives election at Siquijor's Lone district
Party	Candidate	Votes	%
Lakas	Zaldy Villa	41,221	55.14%
Aksyon	Mei Ling Quezon-Brown	30,858	41.28%
Independent	Johnney Ensong	264	0.35%
Valid ballots		72,343	96.77%
Invalid or blank votes		2,415	3.23%
Total votes		74,758	100.00%

== Municipal elections ==
The mayor and vice mayor with the highest number of votes win the seat; they are voted separately, therefore, they may be of different parties when elected. Parties are as stated in their certificates of candidacy.

=== Enrique Villanueva ===
- Electorate (2022): 5,343 (14 Election Returns)
- Turnout (2022): 4,720 (88.34%)

Nale Vincent Masayon is the incumbent. He is now running for governor. Meanwhile, incumbent vice-mayor Ruth Aque is now vying for mayor.

Enrique Villanueva Mayoral Election
Party	Candidate	Votes	%
PFP	Ruth Aque	2,955	53.25%
Aksyon	Gina Magsalay-Medalle	2,432	43.83%
Valid ballots		5,387	97.08%
Invalid or blank votes		162	2.92%
Total votes		5,549	100.00%

Enrique Villanueva Vice Mayoral Election
Party	Candidate	Votes	%
PFP	Gerold Pal-ing	3,073	55.38%
Aksyon	Neh Karl Dimalig	2,291	41.29%
Valid ballots		5,364	96.67%
Invalid or blank votes		185	3.33%
Total votes		5,549	100.00%

=== Larena ===
- Electorate (2022): 11,962 (28 election returns)
- Turnout (2022): 10,041 (83.94%)

Incumbents Cyrus Vincent Calibo and Jan Dean Villa are reelectionists.

Larena Mayoral Election
Party	Candidate	Votes	%
Aksyon	Cyrus Vincent Calibo		
PFP	Elvis Villa		
Valid ballots			
Invalid or blank votes			
Total votes			

Larena Vice Mayoral Election
Party	Candidate	Votes	%
PFP	Clare Lucero		
Aksyon	Jan Dean Villa		
Valid ballots			
Invalid or blank votes			
Total votes			

=== Lazi ===
- Electorate (2022): 16,139 (26 election returns)
- Turnout (2022): 14,296 (88.58%)

Incumbent mayor Phil Moore Largo is running against vice-mayor Rose Mae Dalaygon.

Lazi Mayoral Election
Party	Candidate	Votes	%
Independent	Rose Mae Dalaygon		
Independent	Hannah Mae Ensong		
PFP	Phil Moore Largo		
Aksyon	James Monte		
Valid ballots			
Invalid or blank votes			
Total votes			

Lazi Vice Mayoral Election
Party	Candidate	Votes	%
Independent	Mark Harold Dalaygon		
Independent	Isidore Dumam-ag		
Aksyon	Orpheus Fua		
PFP	Michael Omictin		
Valid ballots			
Invalid or blank votes			
Total votes			

=== Maria ===
- Electorate (2022): 11,128 (24 election returns)
- Turnout (2022): 9,777 (87.86%)

Mayor Roselyn Asok is the incumbent. Meanwhile, incumbent vice-mayor Ivy Dan Samson is term-limited.

Maria Mayoral Election
Party	Candidate	Votes	%
PFP	Roselyn Asok		
Aksyon	Steff Aidan Daug		
Valid ballots			
Invalid or blank votes			
Total votes			

Maria Vice Mayoral Election
Party	Candidate	Votes	%
PFP	Meynard Asok		
Aksyon	Ivy Steve Paulin		
Valid ballots			
Invalid or blank votes			
Total votes			

=== San Juan ===
- Electorate (2022): 12,007 (24 election returns)
- Turnout (2022): 10,684 (88.98%)

Incumbents Wilfredo Capundag Jr. and Rubilyn Ragay are all vied for mayor of the town.

San Juan Mayoral Election
Party	Candidate	Votes	%
Aksyon	Wilfredo Capundag Jr.		
PFP	Rubilyn Ragay		
Valid ballots			
Invalid or blank votes			
Total votes			

San Juan Vice Mayoral Election
Party	Candidate	Votes	%
Aksyon	Jayson Capundag		
Independent	Dioscoro Maata		
PFP	Dario Ocay		
Valid ballots			
Invalid or blank votes			
Total votes			

=== Siquijor ===
- Electorate (2022): 21,879 (48 election returns)
- Turnout (2022): 19,585 (89.52%)

Incumbents Richard Quezon and Teodoro Jumawan Jr. are term-limited. Quezon is now running for vice-mayor and Jumawan for first district board member.

Siquijor Mayoral Election
Party	Candidate	Votes	%
PFP	Adam Duhaylungsod		
Aksyon	Arturo Pacatang		
Valid ballots			
Invalid or blank votes			
Total votes			

Siquijor Vice Mayoral Election
Party	Candidate	Votes	%
PFP	Jayson Dawami		
Aksyon	Richard Quezon		
Valid ballots			
Invalid or blank votes			
Total votes			
