= 2016 Siquijor local elections =

Philippine election

2016 Siquijor gubernatorial election
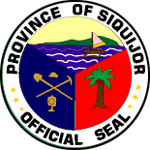
- May 13, 2019
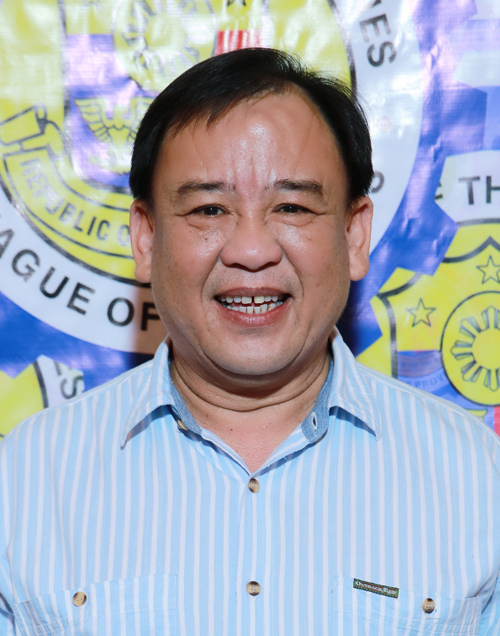
Nominee	Zaldy Villa	Orlando Fua	Claire Bulahan-Lucero
Party	Liberal	UNA	NUP
Running mate	Mei Ling Quezon	Arturo Pacatang
Popular vote	31,708	15,481	3,888
Percentage	60.02%	29.31%	7.36%
Nominee	Armin Demetillo	Regidor Miraflor
Party	Independent	Independent
Popular vote	1,471	279
Percentage	2.78%	0.53%
Governor before election
Zaldy Villa
Liberal
Elected Governor
Zaldy Villa
Liberal

Local elections in Siquijor held on May 9, 2016 as part of the 2016 Philippine general election. Voters elected all local posts in the province: a town mayor, vice mayor, town councilors, as well as members of the Sangguniang Panlalawigan - three in each of the province's two administrative districts, the governor, vice governor, and one representative for lone district of Siquijor.

A total of 189 candidates are running for all local positions in the province and in six municipalities of Siquijor.

The total number of registered voters in the province is 68,988.

== Congressional Election result ==
=== Lone District, Congressman ===
- City: none
- Municipality: Enrique Villanueva, Larena, Lazi, Maria, San Juan, Siquijor
- Population (2010): 91,066

Marie Anne Pernes is the incumbent. Parties are stated in their certificates of candidacy.

Philippine House of Representatives election at Siquijor's Lone district
Party	Candidate	Votes	%
Independent	Ramon Vicente Antonio Rocamora	22,125	40.61%
Liberal	Marie Anne Pernes	18,216	33.43%
UNA	Orlando Fua Jr.	9,695	17.79%
Independent	Carl Mark Ganhinhin	4,439	8.14%
Total votes		54,475	100.00%

== Provincial Election Results ==
=== Governor ===
Zaldy Villa is the incumbent. Parties are stated in their certificates of candidacy.

Siquijor gubernatorial election
Party	Candidate	Votes	%
Liberal	Zaldy Villa	31,708	60.02%
UNA	Orlando Fua	15,481	29.31%
NUP	Claire Bulahan-Lucero	3,888	7.36%
Independent	Armin Demetillo	1,471	2.78%
Independent	Regidor Miraflor	279	0.53%
Total votes		52,827	100.00%

=== Vice-Governor ===
Fernando "Dingdong" Avanzado is the incumbent. However, he is not seeking for reelection.

Siquijor vice-gubernatorial election
Party	Candidate	Votes	%
Liberal	Mei Ling Minor-Quezon	26,135	51.35%
Independent	Bryan Joshua Pernes	14,809	29.10%
UNA	Arturo Pacatang	8,026	15.77%
Independent	Galileo Lee Jumawan	1,140	2.24%
Independent	James Peter Serencio	785	1.54%
Total votes		50,895	100.00%

=== Sangguniang Panlalawigan ===
==== 1st District ====
- Municipalities: Enrique Villanueva, Larena, Siquijor

Parties are as stated in their certificates of candidacy.

Siquijor 1st District Sangguniang Panlalawigan election
Party	Candidate	Votes	%
Liberal	Cyrus Olpoc	14,540	21.06%
Liberal	Leonardo Lingcay	13,872	20.09%
Liberal	Dar Lynn Ates-Honrubia	13,208	19.13%
Independent	Arthur Chan	8,317	12.04%
Independent	Joan Antonette Albito	7,748	11.22%
NUP	Haidee Lucero	4,441	6.43%
NUP	James Aso	4,260	6.17%
Independent	James Gapol	2,648	3.83%
Total votes		69,034	100.00%

==== 2nd District ====
- Municipalities: Maria, Lazi, San Juan

Parties are as stated in their certificates of candidacy.

Siquijor 2nd District Sangguniang Panlalawigan election
Party	Candidate	Votes	%
Liberal	Dindo Tumala	13,128	22.72%
Liberal	Jaime Valesco	7,861	13.61%
Liberal	Noel Monte	9,618	16.65%
Independent	Rommel Dimagnaong	7,763	13.44%
Liberal	Rebecca Padayhag	7,135	12.35%
Independent	Edwin Quimno	5,313	9.19%
Independent	Leonido Bonachita	3,707	6.41%
Independent	Agustin Fua	3,234	5.59%
Total votes		57,759	100.00%

== Municipal Election Results ==
All municipalities of Siquijor elected mayor, vice-mayor and councilors this election. The mayor and vice mayor with the highest number of votes win the seat; they are voted separately, therefore, they may be of different parties when elected. Below is the list of Mayoral and vice-Mayoral candidates of each municipalities of the province.

=== Enrique Villanueva ===
- Voter Population (2016): 4,836

Gerold Pal-ing is the incumbent.

Enrique Villanueva Mayoral Election
Party	Candidate	Votes	%
Liberal	Gerold Pal-ing	2,566	61.28%
Aksyon	Francis Michael Tong	867	20.70%
NUP	Mimi Alcala	751	17.93%
Independent	Dally Samson	3	0.07%
Total votes		4,187	100.00%

Leonardo Paculba is the incumbent.

Enrique Villanueva Vice Mayoral Election
Party	Candidate	Votes	%
Liberal	Leonardo Paculba	2,526	66.87%
NUP	Joel Magsalay	1,251	33.12%
Total votes		3,777	100.00%

=== Larena ===
- Voter Population (2016): 10,393

Dean Villa is the incumbent.

Larena Mayoral Election
Party	Candidate	Votes	%
Liberal	Dean Villa	6,495	77.84%
Aksyon	Jose Felix Lucero	1,239	14.84%
Independent	Ronnie Villa	610	7.31%
Total votes		8,344	100.00%

Cyrus Gold Calibo is the incumbent.

Larena Vice Mayoral Election
Party	Candidate	Votes	%
Liberal	Cyrus Gold Calibo	6,014	73.69%
NUP	Honey Grace Samson	1,855	22.73%
Independent	Marlon Padayag	292	3.57%
Total votes		8,161	100.00%

=== Lazi ===
- Voter Population (2016): 14,279

Orpheus Fua is the incumbent. However is ineligible for reelection due to term limits.

Lazi Mayoral Election
Party	Candidate	Votes	%
Independent	James Monte	4,032	38.83%
PDP–Laban	John Ensong	2,916	28.08%
Liberal	Lydio Ligutom	2,368	22.80%
NUP	Al Ajas	1,067	10.27%
Total votes		10,383	100.00%

James Monte is term limited. He is running for mayor.

Lazi Vice Mayoral Election
Party	Candidate	Votes	%
Independent	Earl Aljas	4,710	55.30%
Liberal	Myrna Ondo	3,807	44.69%
Total votes		8,517	100.00%

=== Maria ===
- Voter Population (2016): 10,079

Meynard Asok is the incumbent.

Maria Mayoral Election
Party	Candidate	Votes	%
Liberal	Meynard Asok	4,788	60.72%
Independent	Frederick Padayhag	3,097	39.27%
Total votes		7,885	100.00%

Orlando Fernando is the incumbent.

Maria Vice Mayoral Election
Party	Candidate	Votes	%
Liberal	Ivy Dan Samson	4,196	58.00%
Independent	Orlando Fernando	3,038	41.99%
Total votes		7,234	100.00%

=== San Juan ===
- Voter Population (2016): 10,037

Wilfredo Capundag Jr. is the incumbent.

San Juan Mayoral Election
Party	Candidate	Votes	%
Liberal	Alberto Ocay	4,312	53.24%
NUP	Wilfredo Capundag Jr.	3,786	46.75%
Total votes		7,234	100.00%

Lillian Fe Sumalpong is the incumbent.

San Juan Vice Mayoral Election
Party	Candidate	Votes	%
Liberal	Gemma Cenas	4,055	52.73%
Independent	Lillian Fe Sumalpong	3,634	47.26%
Total votes		7,689	100.00%

=== Siquijor ===
- Voter Population (2016): 19,364

Mei Ling Quezon is term limited. She is running for vice-governor.

Siquijor Mayoral Election
Party	Candidate	Votes	%
Liberal	Richard Quezon	10,051	70.82%
Independent	Paul Ivar Ada	4,141	29.17%
Total votes		14,192	100.00%

Richard Quezon is term limited. He is running for mayor.

Siquijor Vice Mayoral Election
Party	Candidate	Votes	%
Liberal	Joy Lopes-de Andrade	9,200	67.23%
NUP	Ellaine May Avanzado	4,484	32.76%
Total votes		13,684	100.00%
