= 2019 Siquijor local elections =

Local Philippine election

2019 Siquijor gubernatorial election
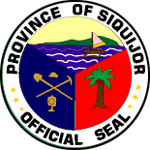
- May 13, 2019
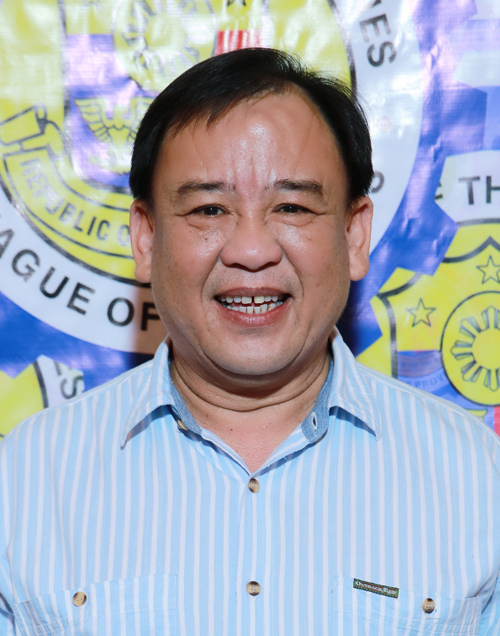
Nominee	Zaldy Villa	Joecel Jumawan-Luy
Party	PDP–Laban	PFP	Independent
Running mate	Mei Ling Quezon	Arthur Chan	Edwin Fua Yu
Popular vote	41,155	14,004	12,879
Percentage	74.61%	25.39%
Governor before election
Zaldy Villa
Liberal
Elected Governor
Zaldy Villa
PDP–Laban

Local elections in Siquijor were held on May 13, 2019 as part of the 2019 Philippine general election. Voters elected all local posts in the province: town mayors, vice mayors, town councilors, as well as members of the Sangguniang Panlalawigan - three in each of the province's two administrative districts, the governor, vice governor, and one representative for lone district of Siquijor.

A total of 188 hopefuls ran for all local positions in the province and in six municipalities of province.

The total number of registered voters in the province is 76,225 which had an increase 10.49% from 68,988 in 2016. Siquijor has 450 precinct venues and 147 clustered precincts.

== Congressional Election result ==
=== Lone District, Congressman ===
- Municipality: Enrique Villanueva, Larena, Lazi, Maria, San Juan, Siquijor
- Population (2019): 95,984
- Electorate (2019): 76,225

Ramon Vicente Antonio Rocamora is the incumbent.

Philippine House of Representatives election at Siquijor's Lone district
Party	Candidate	Votes	%
NPC	Jake Vincent Villa	26,840	45.46%
PDP–Laban	Ramon Vicente Antonio Rocamora	18,775	31.80%
Independent	Orlando Fua Jr.	10,348	17.53%
PFP	Marie Anne Pernes	2,849	4.83%
Independent	Demosthenes Fernandez	223	0.38%
Total votes		59,035	100.00%
NPC gain from PDP–Laban			

== Provincial Election Results ==
=== Governor ===
Zaldy Villa is the incumbent. Parties are stated in their certificates of candidacy.

Siquijor gubernatorial election
Party	Candidate	Votes	%
PDP–Laban	Zaldy Villa	41,155	74.61%
PFP	Joecel Jumawan-Luy	14,004	25.39%
Total votes		55,159	100.00%
PDP–Laban gain from PFP			

=== Vice-Governor ===
Mei Ling Minor-Quezon is the incumbent.

Siquijor vice-gubernatorial election
Party	Candidate	Votes	%
NPC	Mei Ling Minor-Quezon	29,230	55.24%
Independent	Edwin Fua Yu	12,879	24.34%
PFP	Arthur Chan	10,808	20.42%
Total votes		52,917	100.00%
NPC gain from Independent			

=== Sangguniang Panlalawigan ===
==== 1st District ====
- Municipalities: Enrique Villanueva, Larena, Siquijor

Parties are as stated in their certificates of candidacy.

Siquijor 1st District Sangguniang Panlalawigan election
Party	Candidate	Votes	%
PDP–Laban	Cyrus Olpoc	15,042	23.54%
PDP–Laban	Leonardo Lingcay	14,659	22.94%
PDP–Laban	Dar Lynn Ates-Honrubia	12,298	19.25%
Independent	Evelyn Tumarong	10,132	15.86%
PFP	Gilda Gica	5,408	8.46%
Independent	Hedda Baroro	2,775	4.34%
PFP	Daladier Jose Eric Samson	1,834	2.87%
PFP	Felix Suamen	1,747	2.73%
Total votes		63,895	100.00%
PDP–Laban gain from Independent			

==== 2nd District ====
- Municipalities: Maria, Lazi, San Juan

Parties are as stated in their certificates of candidacy.

Siquijor 2nd District Sangguniang Panlalawigan election
Party	Candidate	Votes	%
PDP–Laban	Dindo Tumala	14,636	23.59%
PDP–Laban	Noel Monte	11,309	18.23%
Independent	Orville Fua	10,348	16.68%
PDP–Laban	Jaime Valesco	9,784	15.77%
Independent	Lyndon Jo	6,934	11.18%
Independent	Leonido Bonachita	3,625	5.84%
PFP	Bryan Bruce Aljas	3,125	5.04%
PFP	Meredith Ariel Tambuyat	1,210	1.95%
PFP	Rolando Albia	1,063	1.71%
Total votes		62,034	100.00%
PDP–Laban gain from Independent			

== Municipal Election Results ==
The mayor and vice mayor with the highest number of votes win the seat; they are voted separately, therefore, they may be of different parties when elected. Below is results of mayoral and vice-mayoral elections of each municipalities of the province.

=== Enrique Villanueva ===
- Electorate (2019): 5,329

Gerold Pal-ing is the incumbent.

Enrique Villanueva Mayoral Election
Party	Candidate	Votes	%
PDP–Laban	Gerold Pal-ing	2,286	62.42%
PFP	Francis Michael Tong	1,376	37.58%
Total votes		3,662	100.00%
PDP–Laban gain from PFP			

Leonardo Paculba is the incumbent.

Enrique Villanueva Vice Mayoral Election
Party	Candidate	Votes	%
PDP–Laban	Leonardo Paculba	2,036	56.98%
PFP	Belinda Banglos-Inao	1,537	43.02%
PDP–Laban gain from PFP			
Total votes		3,573	100.00%

=== Larena ===
- Electorate (2019): 15,827

Dean Villa is the incumbent.

Larena Mayoral Election
Party	Candidate	Votes	%
PDP–Laban	Dean Villa	6,495	81.65%
PFP	Honey Grace Samson	1,516	18.35%
Total votes		8,262	100.00%
PDP–Laban gain from PFP			

Cyrus Vincent Marchan Calibo is the incumbent.

Larena Vice Mayoral Election
Party	Candidate	Votes	%
PDP–Laban	Cyrus Vincent Marchan Calibo	7,001	90.50%
PFP	Luke Francis Johann Pernes	1,736	9.50%
PDP–Laban gain from PFP			

=== Lazi ===
- Electorate (2019): 15,827

James Monte is the incumbent.

Lazi Mayoral Election
Party	Candidate	Votes	%
Independent	James Monte	5,346	46.12%
PDP–Laban	Johnney Ensong	4,253	36.69%
Independent	Harold Mark Dalaygon	1,262	9.60%
PFP	Rommel Dimagnaong	880	7.59%
Total votes		11,592	100.00%
Independent gain from PDP–Laban			

Earl Aljas is the incumbent.

Lazi Vice Mayoral Election
Party	Candidate	Votes	%
Independent	Earl Aljas	4,999	50.65%
PDP–Laban	Myrna Bandigas-Ondo	4,871	49.35%
Total votes		9,870	100.00%
Independent gain from PDP–Laban			

=== Maria ===
- Electorate (2019): 11,157

Meynard Asok is the incumbent.

Maria Mayoral Election
Party	Candidate	Votes	%
PDP–Laban	Meynard Asok	5,889	72.15%
PFP	Rebecca Padayhag	2,273	27.85%
Total votes		8,162	100.00%
PDP–Laban gain from PFP			

Ivy Dan Samson is the incumbent.

Maria Vice Mayoral Election
Party	Candidate	Votes	%
PDP–Laban	Ivy Dan Samson	5,889	60.33%
PFP	Candelaria Abuhan-Aninipo	2,816	39.67%
Total votes		7,098	100.00%
PDP–Laban gain from PFP			

=== San Juan ===
- Electorate (2019): 11,325

Alberto Ocay is the incumbent.

San Juan Mayoral Election
Party	Candidate	Votes	%
PFP	Wilfredo 'James' Capundag Jr.	3,959	48.20%
PDP–Laban	Alberto Ocay	3,332	40.56%
Independent	Edgar Maghanoy	752	9.16%
Independent	Dexter Angot	132	1.61%
Independent	Raymund Balongkit	39	0.47%
Total votes		8,214	100.00%
PFP gain from PDP–Laban			

Gemma Magtagad-Cenas is the incumbent.

San Juan Vice Mayoral Election
Party	Candidate	Votes	%
PDP–Laban	Gemma Magtagad-Cenas	4,262	57.19%
PFP	Dioscoro 'Bulaw' Maata	1,745	23.41%
Independent	Jimmy Jumawan	1,446	19.40%
Total votes		7,453	100.00%
PDP–Laban gain from PFP			

=== Siquijor ===
- Electorate (2019): 21,097

Richard Quezon is the incumbent.

Siquijor Mayoral Election
Party	Candidate	Votes	%
PDP–Laban	Richard Quezon	7,830	50.10%
Independent	Adam Duhaylungsod	7,278	46.57%
PFP	Lywilyn Emeterio	520	3.33%
Total votes		15,628	100.00%
PDP–Laban gain from Independent			

Joy Abe Lopes de Andrade is the incumbent.

Siquijor Vice Mayoral Election
Party	Candidate	Votes	%
PDP–Laban	Teodro 'Junnie' Jumawan Jr.	8,425	58.14%
Independent	Joy Abe Lopes de Andrade	5,403	37.28%
PFP	Precious Samson-Gahob	664	4.58%
Total votes		14,492	100.00%
PDP–Laban gain from Independent			
