= 1971 Siquijor creation plebiscite =

- November 8, 1971

Creation of Siquijor
For	95.73%
Against	4.27%

Capital of Siquijor
Siquijor	40.94%
Larena	35.05%
Lazi	21.64%
Others	2.37%

The 1971 Siquijor creation plebiscite was a plebiscite held in the Philippines on the separation of the sub-province of Siquijor from the province of Negros Oriental in order to become its own province as stipulated in Republic Act No. 6398 that was passed on September 17, 1971. A plebiscite on selecting the capital of the new province was also held simultaneously.

The plebiscite was held on November 8, 1971, and the results were announced on February 22, 1972.

== Results ==
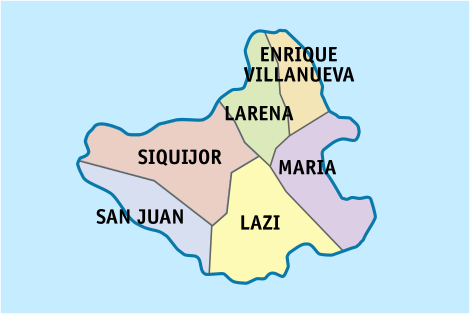
Map of Siquijor

=== Creation of Siquijor province ===
==== Summary ====
Choice	Votes	%
For	12,096	95.73
Against	540	4.27
Total	12,636	100.00
Source: Government Printing Office

==== By municipality ====
Municipality	Yes		No		Total
Municipality	Total	%	Total	%	Total
Enrique Villanueva	591	89.14%	72	10.86%	663
Larena	2,467	93.41%	174	6.59%	2,641
Lazi	2,386	97.99%	49	2.01%	2,435
Maria	1,657	96.96%	52	3.04%	1,709
San Juan	1,177	92.03%	102	7.97%	1,279
Siquijor	3,818	97.67%	91	2.33%	3,909
Total	12,096	95.73%	540	4.27%	12,636
Source: Government Printing Office

=== Siquijor's capital ===
In this multiple-choice referendum, the voting was done under one round, or via first-past-the-post. Larena, the erstwhile capital of the sub-province, was defeated by the municipality of Siquijor to become the capital of the new province.

==== Summary ====
Choice	Votes	%
Siquijor	4,623	40.94
Larena	3,958	35.05
Lazi	2,444	21.64
Maria	148	1.31
San Juan	85	0.75
Enrique Villanueva	35	0.31
Total	11,293	100.00
Source: Government Printing Office

==== By municipality ====
Choice	Siquijor		Larena		Lazi		Maria		San Juan		Enrique Villanueva		Total
Municipality	Total	%	Total	%	Total	%	Total	%	Total	%	Total	%	Total
Enrique Villanueva	116	65.17%	22	12.36%	6	3.37%	1	0.56%	0	0.00%	33	18.54%	178
Larena	806	24.45%	2,487	75.46%	3	0.09%	0	0.00%	0	0.00%	0	0.00%	3,296
Lazi	28	1.08%	353	13.65%	2,203	85.19%	0	0.00%	0	0.00%	2	0.08%	2,586
Maria	49	3.88%	873	69.18%	192	15.21%	147	11.65%	1	0.08%	0	0.00%	1,262
San Juan	13	5.16%	118	46.83%	37	14.68%	0	0.00%	84	33.33%	0	0.00%	252
Siquijor	3,611	97.10%	105	2.82%	3	0.08%	0	0.00%	0	0.00%	0	0.00%	3,719
Total	4,623	40.94%	3,958	35.05%	2,444	21.64%	148	1.31%	85	0.75%	35	0.31%	11,293
Source: Government Printing Office
