= Jake Vincent Villa =

Filipino politician

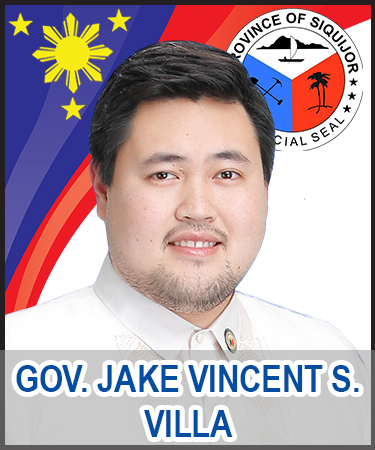

Governor of Siquijor
- Incumbent
- Assumed office June 30, 2022
- Vice Governor: Mei Ling Quezon (2022–2025); Dindo Tumala (2025–present)
- Preceded by: Zaldy Villa

Member of the House of Representatives of the Philippines for Siquijor's at-large congressional district
- In office June 30, 2019 – June 30, 2022
- Preceded by: Ramon Vicente Rocamora
- Succeeded by: Zaldy Villa

Personal details
- Born: Jake Vincent Sarmiento Villa; May 1, 1989 (age 36) Cebu City, Philippines
- Party: PFP (2024–present)
- Other political affiliations: NPC (2018–2024)
- Parent: Zaldy Villa
- Occupation: Politician

Jake Vincent Sarmiento Villa (born May 1, 1989) is a Filipino politician who has served as Governor of Siquijor since 2022. He was re-elected in 2025.

== Electoral history ==
Electoral history of Jake Vincent Villa
Year	Office	Party	Votes received				Result
Year	Office	Party	Total	%	P.	Swing	Result
2019	Representative (Siquijor)	NPC	26,840	45.46%	1st	—N/a	Won
2022	Governor of Siquijor	NPC	32,615	47.20%	1st	—N/a	Won
2025	Governor of Siquijor	PFP	42,149	57.99%	1st	+10.79	Won

== See also ==
- List of current Philippine governors
