= San Juan, Siquijor =

Municipality in Siquijor, Philippines

San Juan
- Municipality
- Municipality of San Juan
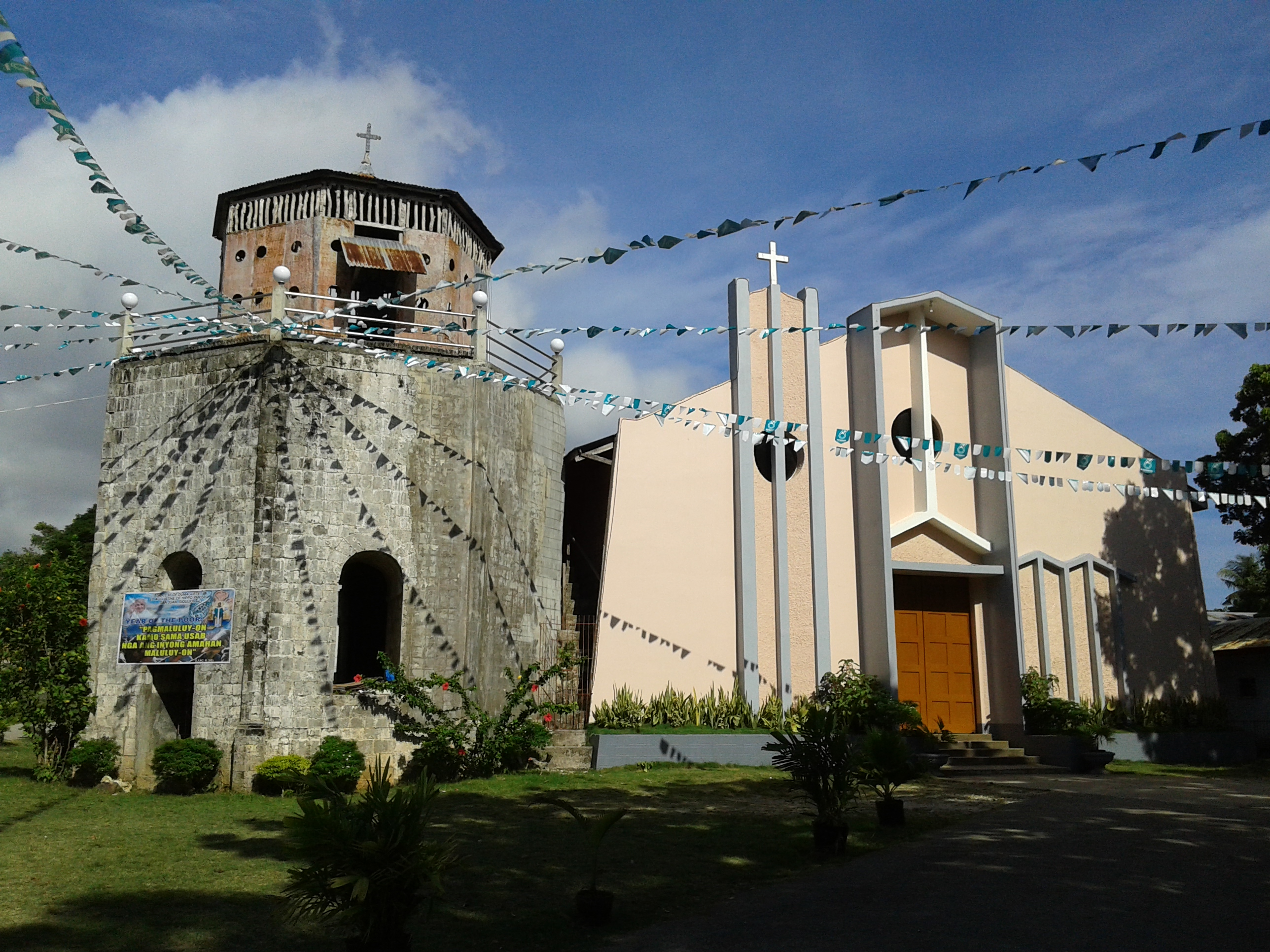
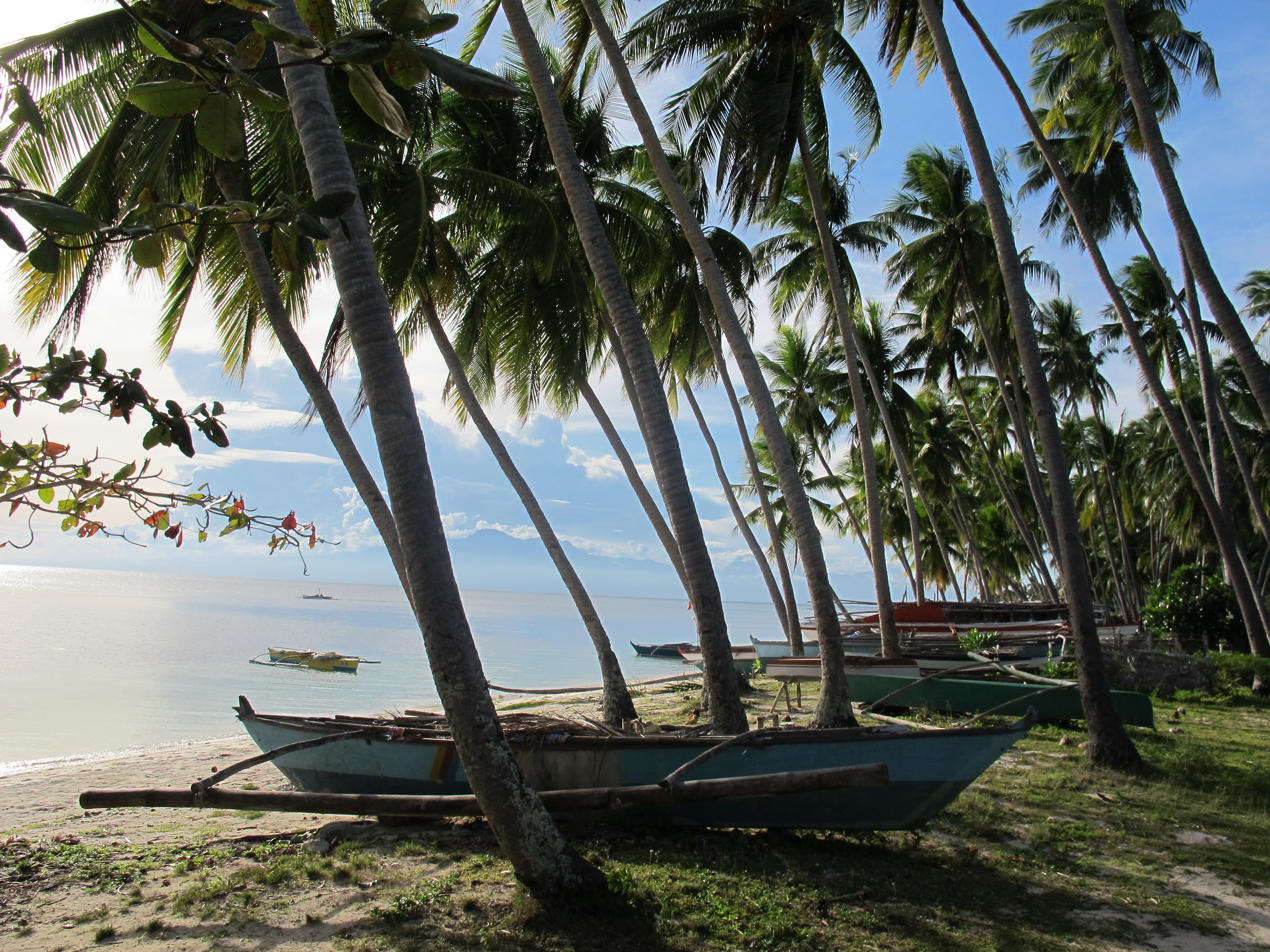
- Tubod Marine Sanctuary St. Augustine of Hippo Parish Church Paliton Beach

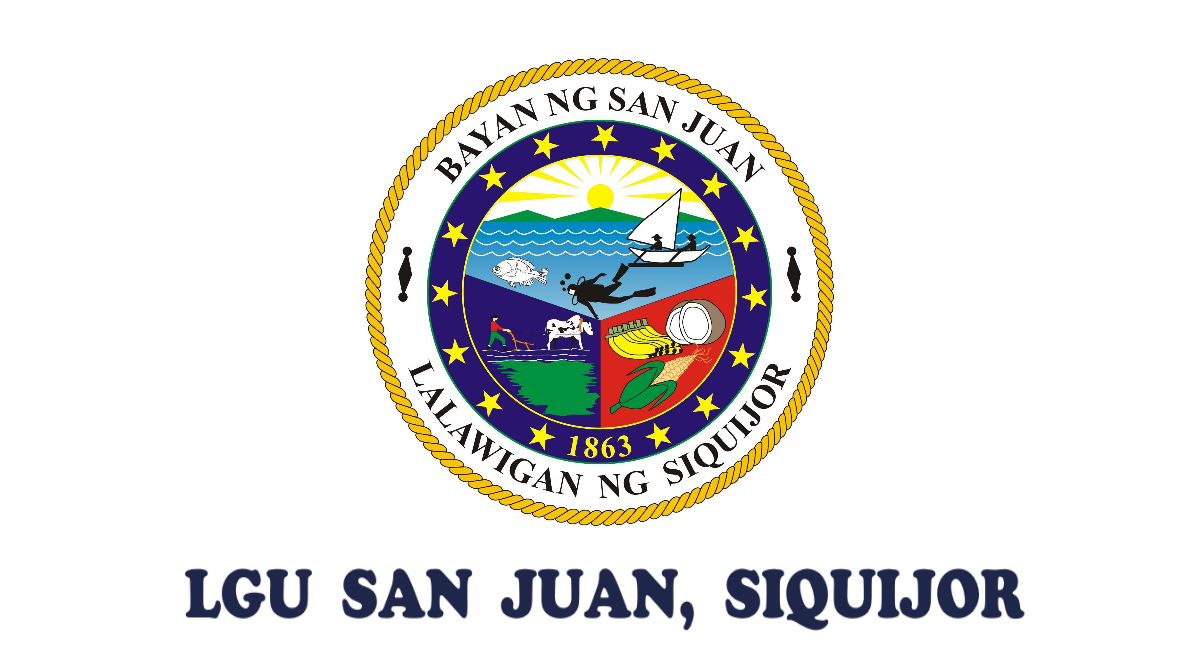
- Flag

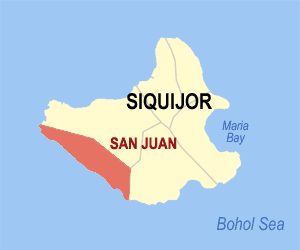
- Map of Siquijor with San Juan highlighted
- Interactive map of San Juan
- Location within the Philippines
- Coordinates: 9°09′32″N 123°29′38″E
- Country: Philippines
- Region: Negros Island Region
- Province: Siquijor
- District: Lone district
- Barangays: 15 (see Barangays)

Government
  - Type: Sangguniang Bayan
  - Mayor: Rubilyn M. Ragay (PFP)
  - Vice Mayor: Jayson M. Capundag (Aksyon)
  - Representative: Zaldy Villa (Lakas)
  - Municipal Council: Members: Jacinto V. Maata; Merry Cris B. Tumala; Apolinar T. Macalisang; Rodolfo L. Tompong, Jr.; Warlito Y. Suan; Eddie Mathew C. Colong; Donnalyn A. Jo; Lyndon C. Buhian
  - Electorate: 12,640 voters (2025)

Area
  - Total: 44.37 km^{2} (17.13 sq mi)
- Elevation: 55 m (180 ft)
- Highest elevation: 391 m (1,283 ft)
- Lowest elevation: 0 m (0 ft)

Population (2024 census)
  - Total: 17,291
  - Density: 389.7/km^{2} (1,009/sq mi)
  - Households: 4,230

Economy
  - Income class: 4th municipal income class
  - Poverty incidence: 5.36% (2023)
  - Revenue: ₱ 119.3 million (2022)
  - Assets: ₱ 339.3 million (2022)
  - Expenditure: ₱ 76.54 million (2022)
  - Liabilities: ₱ 46.03 million (2022)

Service provider
  - Electricity: Province of Siquijor Electric Cooperative (PROSIELCO)
- Time zone: UTC+8 (PST)
- ZIP code: 6227
- PSGC: 076105000
- IDD : area code: +63 (0)35
- Native languages: Cebuano; Tagalog
- Patron saint: Saint Augustine of Hippo

San Juan, officially the Municipality of San Juan (Cebuano: Lungsod sa San Juan; Tagalog: Bayan ng San Juan), is a municipality in the province of Siquijor, Philippines. According to the 2024 census, it has a population of 17,291 people.

San Juan is 12 kilometres (7.5 mi) from the provincial capital Siquijor.

== Geography ==
=== Barangays ===
San Juan is politically subdivided into 15 barangays. Each barangay consists of puroks and some have sitios.

PSGC	Barangay	Population			±% p.a.	
		2024		2010		
076105001	Can‑asagan	4.2%	728	545	▴	2.01%
076105002	Candura	2.7%	461	452	▴	0.14%
076105003	Cangmunag	7.5%	1,301	1,127	▴	0.99%
076105004	Cansayang	3.2%	550	498	▴	0.69%
076105005	Catulayan	11.7%	2,022	1,524	▴	1.97%
076105006	Lala‑o	5.0%	866	689	▴	1.59%
076105007	Maite	6.4%	1,100	834	▴	1.92%
076105008	Napo	5.6%	965	780	▴	1.48%
076105009	Paliton	5.3%	911	769	▴	1.17%
076105010	Poblacion	5.2%	896	768	▴	1.07%
076105011	Solangon	8.2%	1,419	1,173	▴	1.32%
076105012	Tag‑ibo	5.5%	945	724	▴	1.85%
076105013	Tambisan	8.0%	1,376	1,190	▴	1.00%
076105014	Timbaon	9.4%	1,620	1,425	▴	0.89%
076105015	Tubod	7.0%	1,203	1,027	▴	1.09%
	Total		17,291	13,525	▴	1.71%

=== Climate ===
Climate data for San Juan, Siquijor
Month	Jan	Feb	Mar	Apr	May	Jun	Jul	Aug	Sep	Oct	Nov	Dec	Year
Mean daily maximum °C (°F)	30 (86)	30 (86)	31 (88)	33 (91)	32 (90)	31 (88)	30 (86)	30 (86)	30 (86)	30 (86)	30 (86)	30 (86)	31 (87)
Mean daily minimum °C (°F)	22 (72)	22 (72)	22 (72)	23 (73)	24 (75)	25 (77)	24 (75)	24 (75)	24 (75)	24 (75)	23 (73)	23 (73)	23 (74)
Average precipitation mm (inches)	26 (1.0)	22 (0.9)	28 (1.1)	41 (1.6)	95 (3.7)	136 (5.4)	147 (5.8)	126 (5.0)	132 (5.2)	150 (5.9)	98 (3.9)	46 (1.8)	1,047 (41.3)
Average rainy days	7.5	6.7	8.9	10.4	21.6	25.6	26.3	25.0	24.1	26.2	19.2	12.1	213.6
Source: Meteoblue (modeled/calculated data, not measured locally)

== Demographics ==
Population census of San Juan

Year	Pop.	±% p.a.
1903	7,300	—
1918	8,015	+0.62%
1939	8,368	+0.21%
1948	8,677	+0.40%
1960	8,421	−0.25%
1970	9,249	+0.94%

Year	Pop.	±% p.a.
1975	10,746	+3.05%
1980	10,592	−0.29%
1990	11,517	+0.84%
1995	11,371	−0.24%
2000	12,198	+1.52%
2007	13,180	+1.07%

Year	Pop.	±% p.a.
2010	13,525	+0.94%
2015	14,854	+1.80%
2020	16,363	+2.06%
2024	17,291	+1.33%

Source: Philippine Statistics Authority

== Economy ==
Poverty incidence of San Juan (%)

Source: Philippine Statistics Authority

== Culture ==
=== Bugwas festival ===
The Bugwas Festival is held in San Juan as the celebration of its annual town fiesta in honor of its patron saint, St. Augustine of Hippo. It was first held in 2006.

== Education ==
The public schools in the town of San Juan are administered by one school district under the Schools Division of Siquijor.

Elementary schools:

- Can-asagan Elementary School — Can-asagan
- Cangmunag Elementary School — Cangmunag
- Cansayang Elementary School — Cansayang
- Catulayan Elementary School — Catulayan
- Napo Elementary School — Napo
- Solangon Elementary School — Solangon
- Tag-ibo Elementary School — Tag-ibo
- Tambisan Elementary School — Tambisan
- Timbaon Elementary School — Timbaon

High schools:

- Catulayan National High School — Catulayan
- Tambisan National High School — Tambisan

Integrated schools:

- San Juan Integrated School (formerly San Juan CS) — Maite

== Image gallery ==
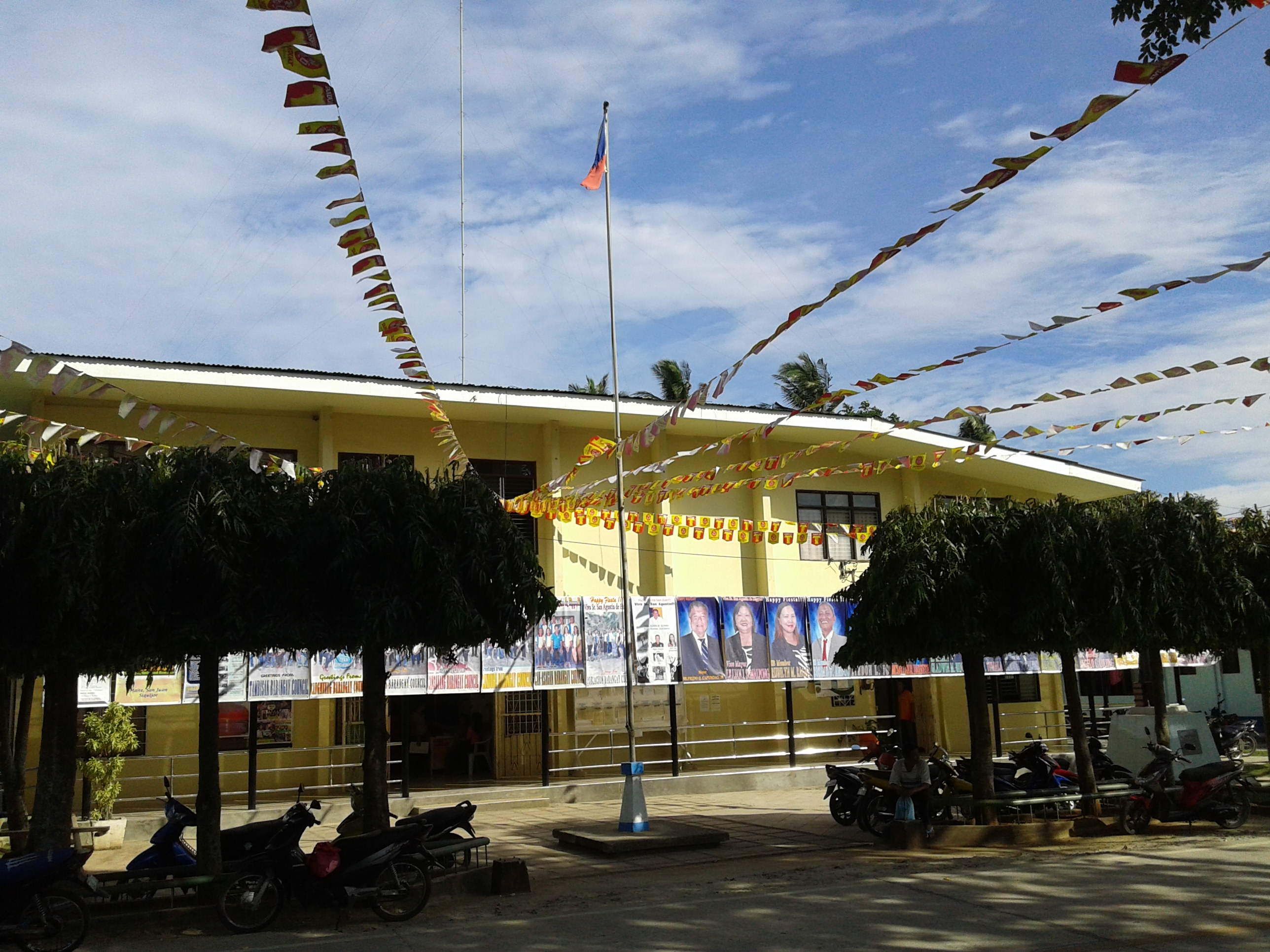
San Juan Town Hall

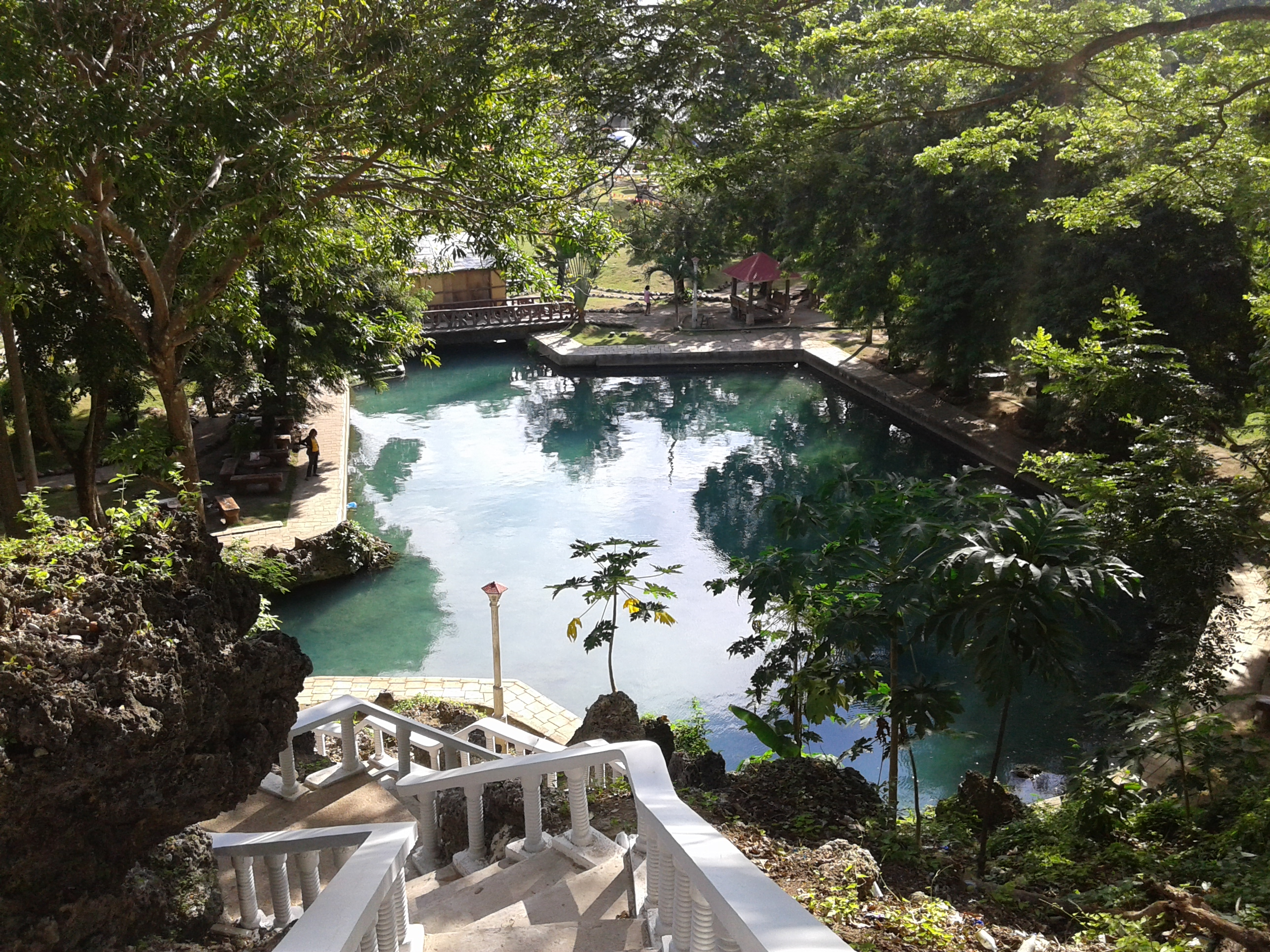
Capilay Spring Park

Coastline
