= Maria, Siquijor =

Municipality in Siquijor, Philippines

Maria
- Municipality
- Municipality of Maria
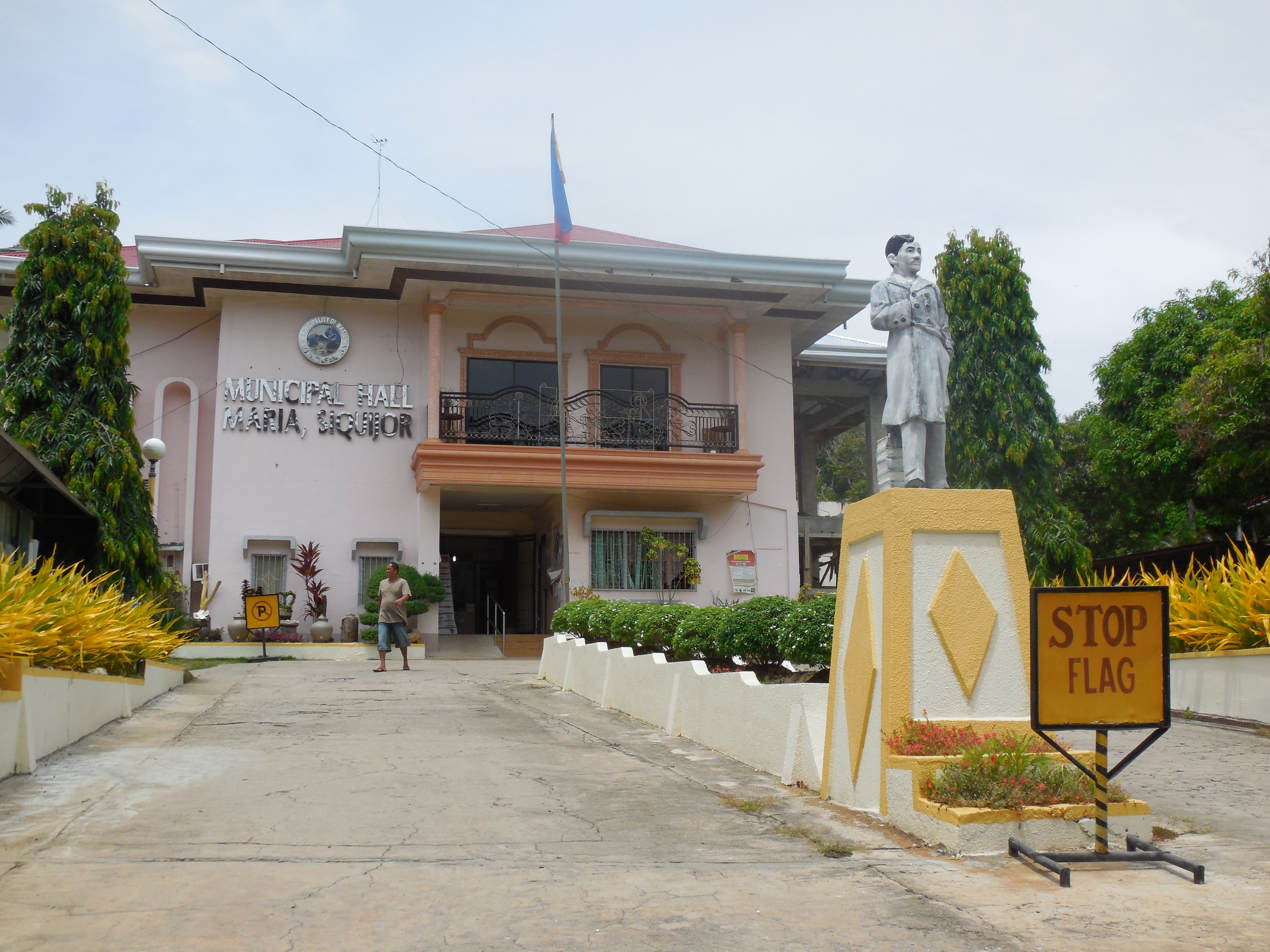
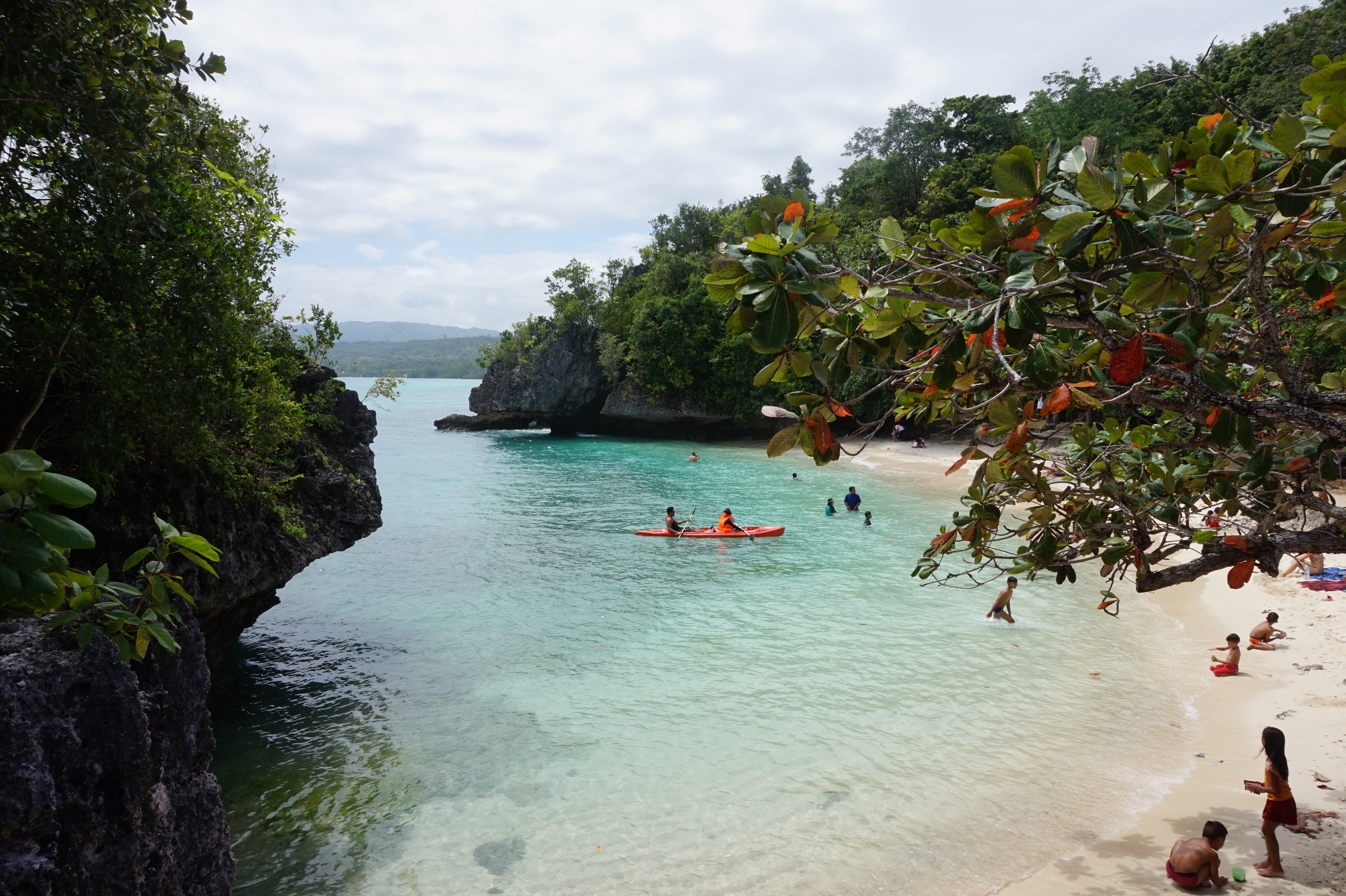
- Nuestra Señora de Providencia Parish Church Maria Town Hall Salagdoong Beach

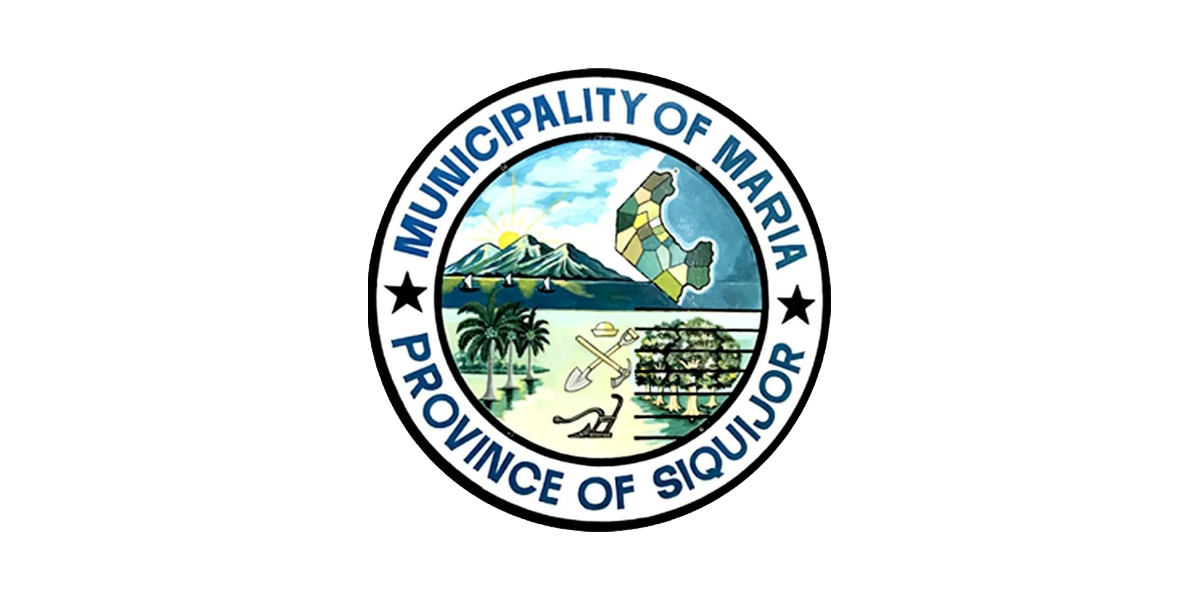
- Flag

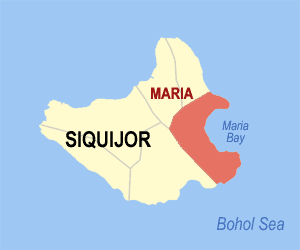
- Map of Siquijor with Maria highlighted
- Interactive map of Maria
- Location within the Philippines
- Coordinates: 9°11′46″N 123°39′18″E
- Country: Philippines
- Region: Negros Island Region
- Province: Siquijor
- District: Lone district
- Barangays: 22 (see Barangays)

Government
  - Type: Sangguniang Bayan
  - Mayor: Roselyn T. Asok (PFP)
  - Vice Mayor: Meynard R. Asok (PFP)
  - Representative: Zaldy Villa (Lakas)
  - Municipal Council: Members: Ronald Guy B. Magpiong; Candelaria A. Aninipo; Meinrad Mark M. Magsayo; Maribeth D. Adlao; Chuser C. Samson; Rivian L. Perez; Jose M. Maglangit, Jr.; Rosally U. Gabas
  - Electorate: 11,532 voters (2025)

Area
  - Total: 53.37 km^{2} (20.61 sq mi)
- Elevation: 23.8 m (78 ft)
- Highest elevation: 448 m (1,470 ft)
- Lowest elevation: 0 m (0 ft)

Population (2024 census)
  - Total: 15,146
  - Density: 283.8/km^{2} (735.0/sq mi)
  - Households: 3,545

Economy
  - Income class: 4th municipal income class
  - Poverty incidence: 6.78% (2023)
  - Revenue: ₱ 108.2 million (2024)
  - Assets: ₱ 152.3 million (2024)
  - Expenditure: ₱ 59.47 million (2024)
  - Liabilities: ₱ 45.69 million (2024)

Service provider
  - Electricity: Province of Siquijor Electric Cooperative (PROSIELCO)
- Time zone: UTC+8 (PST)
- ZIP code: 6229
- PSGC: 076104000
- IDD : area code: +63 (0)35
- Native languages: Cebuano; Tagalog
- Patron saint: Our Lady of Divine Providence

Maria, officially the Municipality of Maria (Cebuano: Lungsod sa Maria; Tagalog: Bayan ng Maria), is a municipality in the province of Siquijor, Philippines. According to the 2024 census, it has a population of 15,146 people.

The name change from the previous local name, Kangmenia, was made by Spanish friars in 1880 to honor Mary, mother of Jesus. Maria is 32 kilometres (20 mi) from the provincial capital Siquijor.

== Geography ==
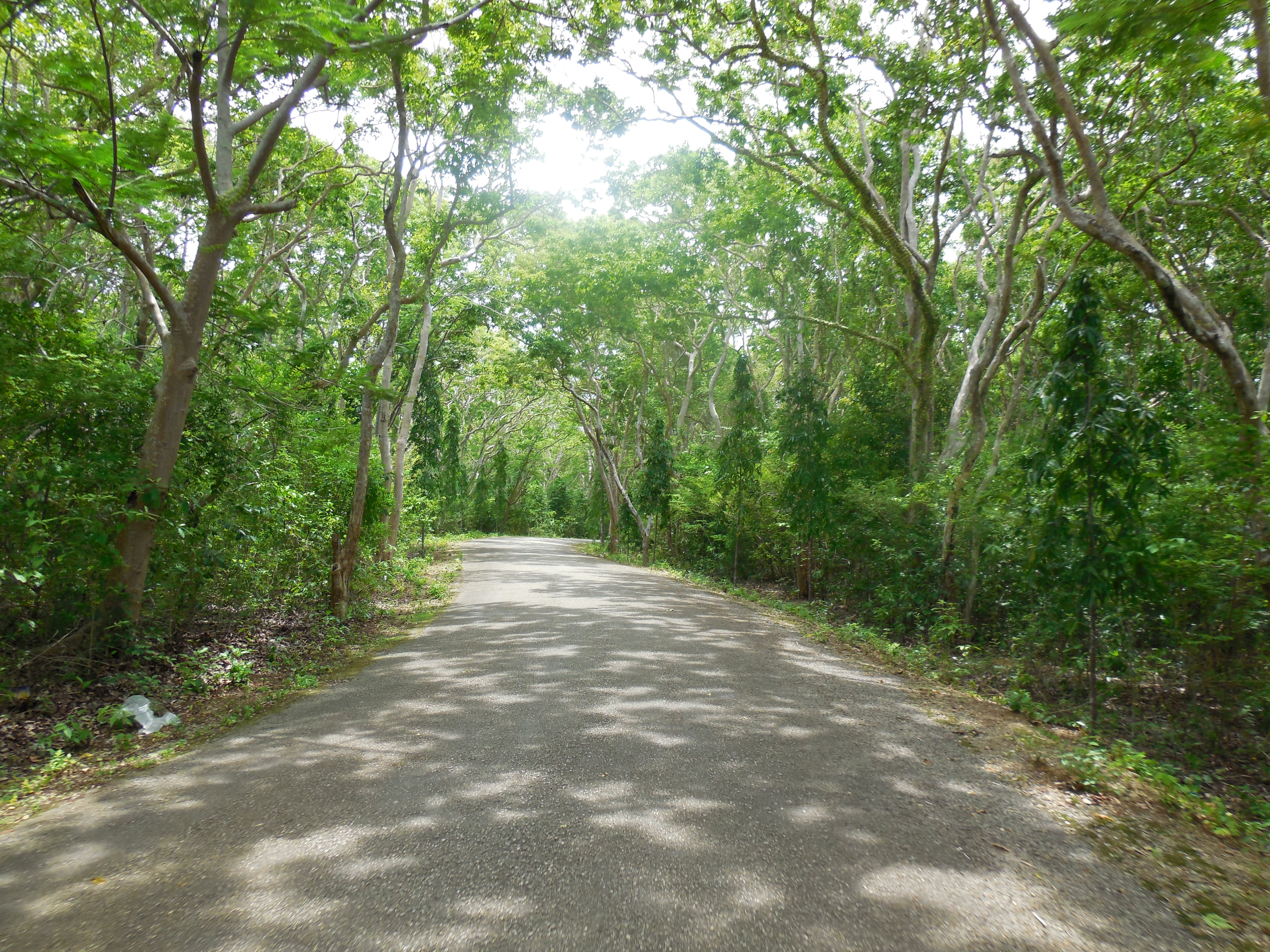
The man-made Salagdoong Forest

=== Barangays ===
Maria is politically subdivided into 22 barangays. Each barangay consists of puroks and some have sitios.

PSGC	Barangay	Population			±% p.a.	
		2024		2010		
076104001	Bogo	5.6%	851	739	▴	0.98%
076104002	Bonga	3.7%	555	459	▴	1.32%
076104003	Cabal‑asan	2.6%	389	357	▴	0.59%
076104004	Calunasan	4.2%	643	641	▴	0.02%
076104005	Candaping A	3.8%	582	448	▴	1.82%
076104006	Candaping B	4.5%	684	591	▴	1.01%
076104007	Cantaroc A	3.1%	462	385	▴	1.26%
076104008	Cantaroc B	3.3%	501	411	▴	1.37%
076104009	Cantugbas	2.7%	412	400	▴	0.20%
076104010	Lico‑an	3.3%	496	529	▾	−0.44%
076104011	Lilo‑an	9.6%	1,459	1,470	▾	−0.05%
076104013	Logucan	4.3%	647	557	▴	1.04%
076104012	Looc	3.2%	489	528	▾	−0.53%
076104014	Minalulan	5.6%	843	703	▴	1.26%
076104015	Nabutay	6.6%	1,000	718	▴	2.31%
076104016	Olang	4.6%	701	592	▴	1.17%
076104017	Pisong A	2.4%	366	292	▴	1.57%
076104018	Pisong B	1.6%	249	293	▾	−1.11%
076104019	Poblacion Norte	7.6%	1,153	1,170	▾	−0.10%
076104020	Poblacion Sur	4.3%	656	675	▾	−0.20%
076104021	Saguing	5.3%	803	946	▾	−1.12%
076104022	Sawang	2.9%	444	479	▾	−0.52%
	Total		15,146	13,383	▴	0.86%

=== Climate ===
Climate data for Maria, Siquijor
Month	Jan	Feb	Mar	Apr	May	Jun	Jul	Aug	Sep	Oct	Nov	Dec	Year
Mean daily maximum °C (°F)	29 (84)	30 (86)	31 (88)	32 (90)	31 (88)	30 (86)	30 (86)	30 (86)	30 (86)	29 (84)	29 (84)	29 (84)	30 (86)
Mean daily minimum °C (°F)	22 (72)	22 (72)	22 (72)	23 (73)	24 (75)	24 (75)	24 (75)	24 (75)	24 (75)	24 (75)	23 (73)	23 (73)	23 (74)
Average precipitation mm (inches)	26 (1.0)	22 (0.9)	28 (1.1)	41 (1.6)	95 (3.7)	136 (5.4)	147 (5.8)	126 (5.0)	132 (5.2)	150 (5.9)	98 (3.9)	46 (1.8)	1,047 (41.3)
Average rainy days	7.5	6.7	8.9	10.4	21.6	25.6	26.3	25.0	24.1	26.2	19.2	12.1	213.6
Source: Meteoblue

== Demographics ==
Population census of Maria
Year	Pop.	±% p.a.
1903	6,499	—
1918	8,477	+1.79%
1939	8,722	+0.14%
1948	8,547	−0.22%
1960	9,335	+0.74%
1970	9,942	+0.63%
1975	10,778	+1.63%
1980	10,951	+0.32%
1990	11,140	+0.17%
1995	11,106	−0.06%
2000	12,275	+2.17%
2007	12,974	+0.77%
2010	13,383	+1.14%
2015	13,828	+0.62%
2020	14,385	+0.83%
2024	15,146	+1.25%
Source: Philippine Statistics Authority

== Economy ==
Poverty incidence of Maria (%)

Source: Philippine Statistics Authority

== Education ==
The public schools in the town of Maria are administered by one school district under the Schools Division of Siquijor.

Maria Integrated School (formerly Maria Elementary School)

Elementary schools:

- Bogo Elementary School — Bogo
- Candaping Elementary School — Candaping B
- Cantaroc Elementary School — Cantaroc B
- Cantugbas Elementary School — Cantugbas
- Lico-an Elementary School — Lico-an
- Lilo-an Elementary School — Lilo-an
- Logucan Elementary School — Logucan
- Minalulan Elementary School — Minalulan
- Nabutay Elementary School — Nabutay
- Pisong A Elementary School — Pisong A
- Pisong B Elementary School — Pisong B

High schools:

- Candaping National High School — Candaping B

Integrated schools:

- Maria Integrated School (formerly Maria CS) — Poblacion Norte
