= Enrique Villanueva =

Municipality in Siquijor, Philippines

Enrique Villanueva Talingting
- Municipality
- Municipality of Enrique Villanueva
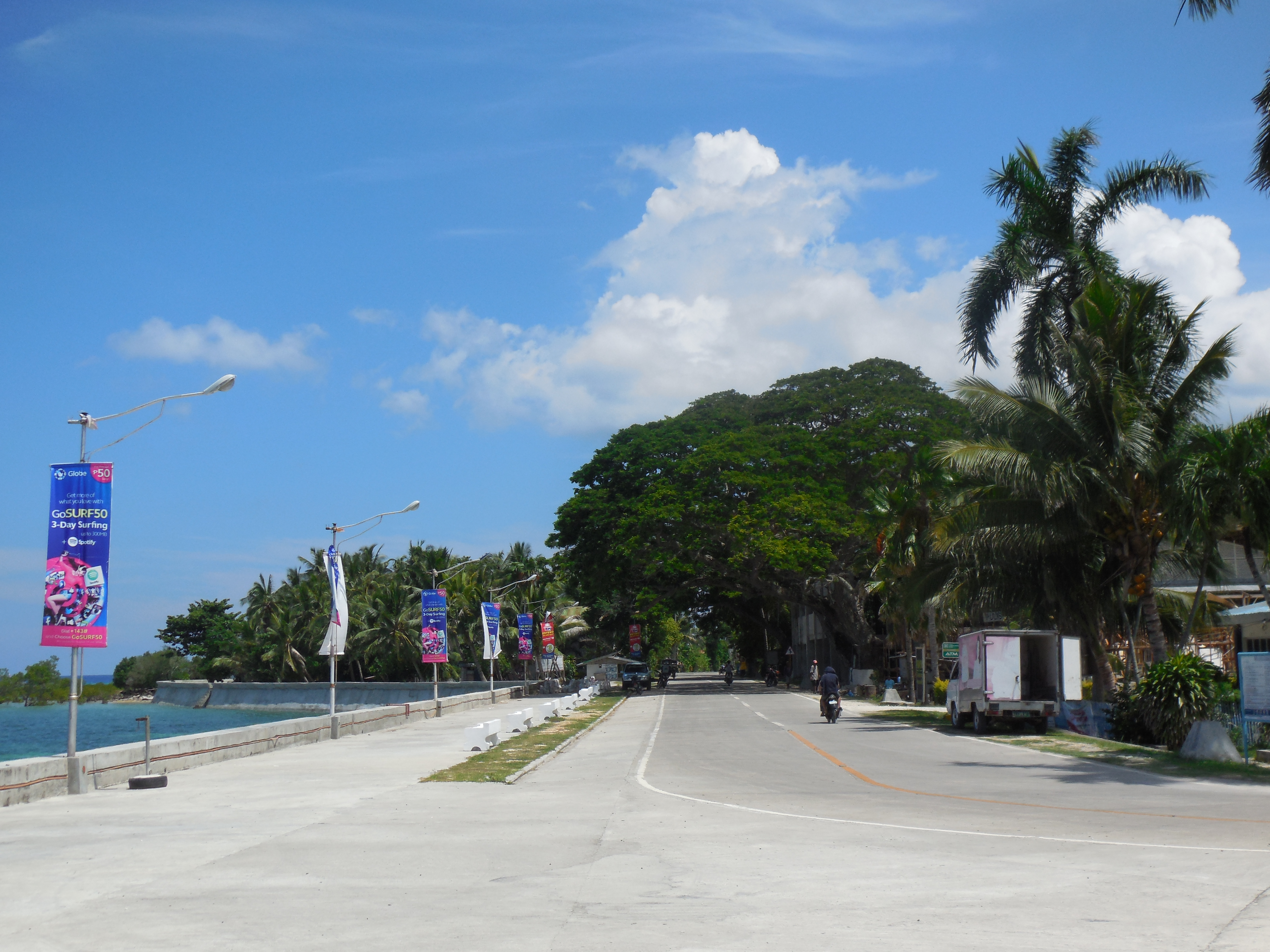
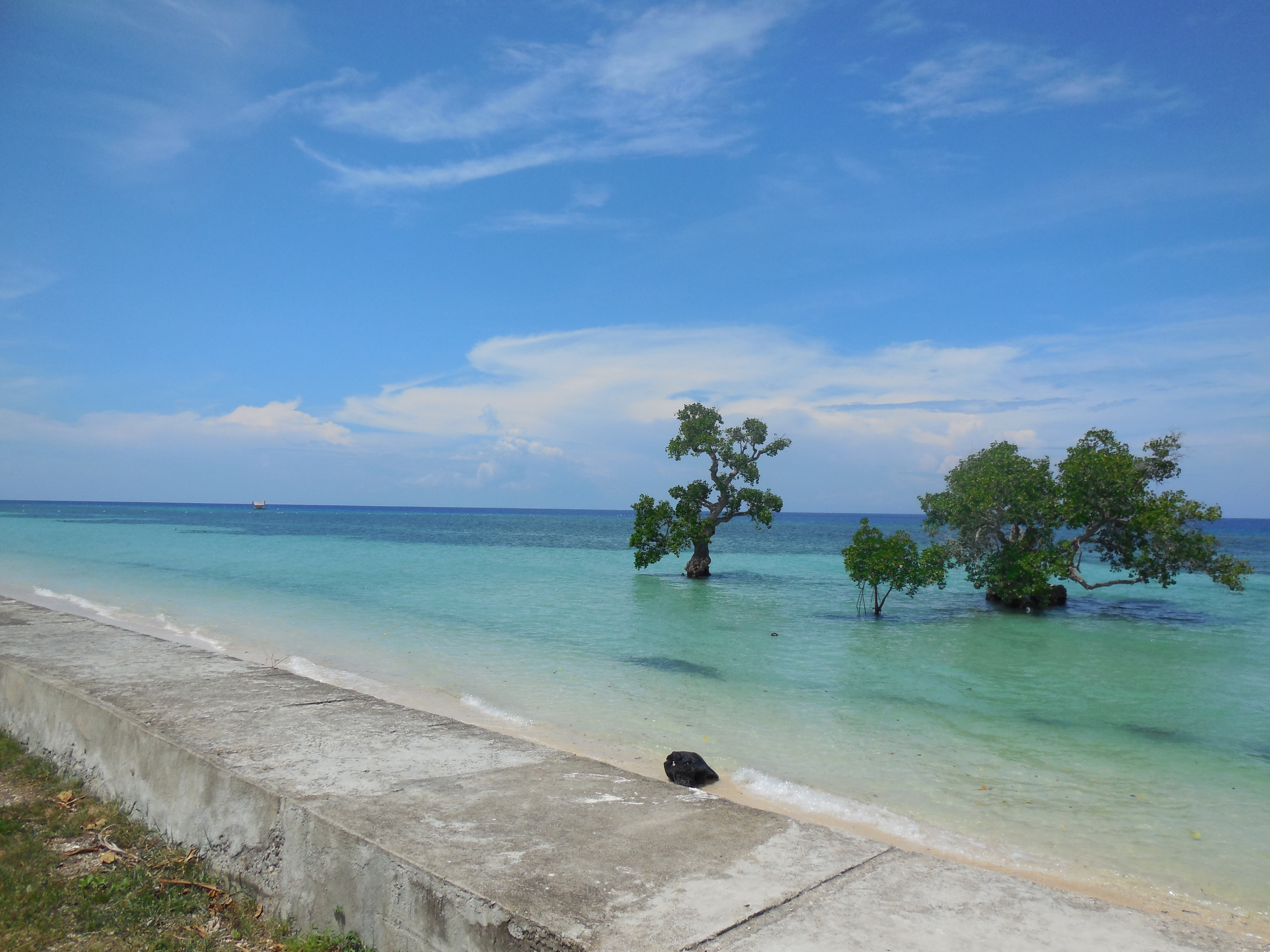
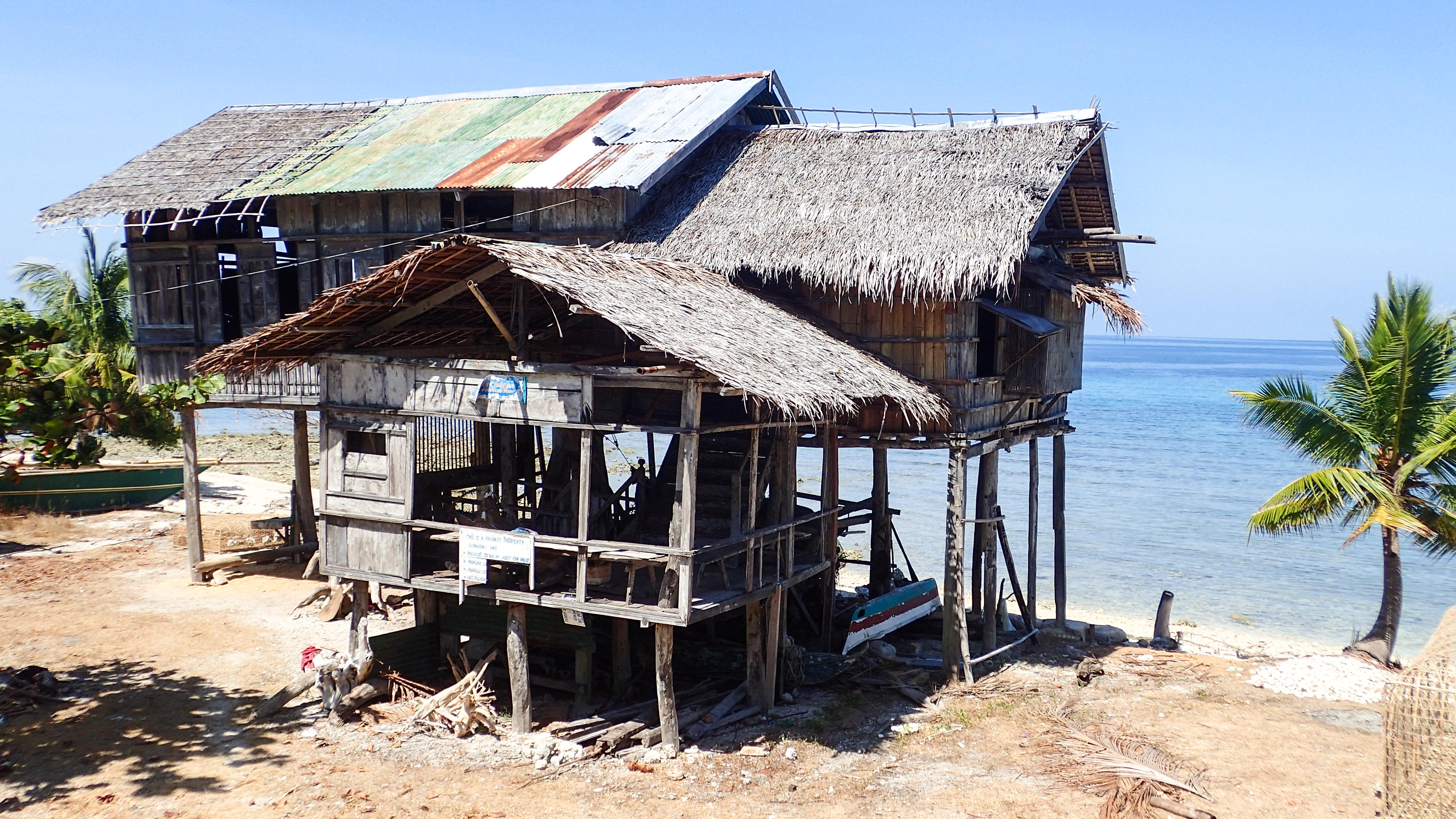
- Island Circumferential Road Tulapos Marine Sanctuary Cang-Isok House

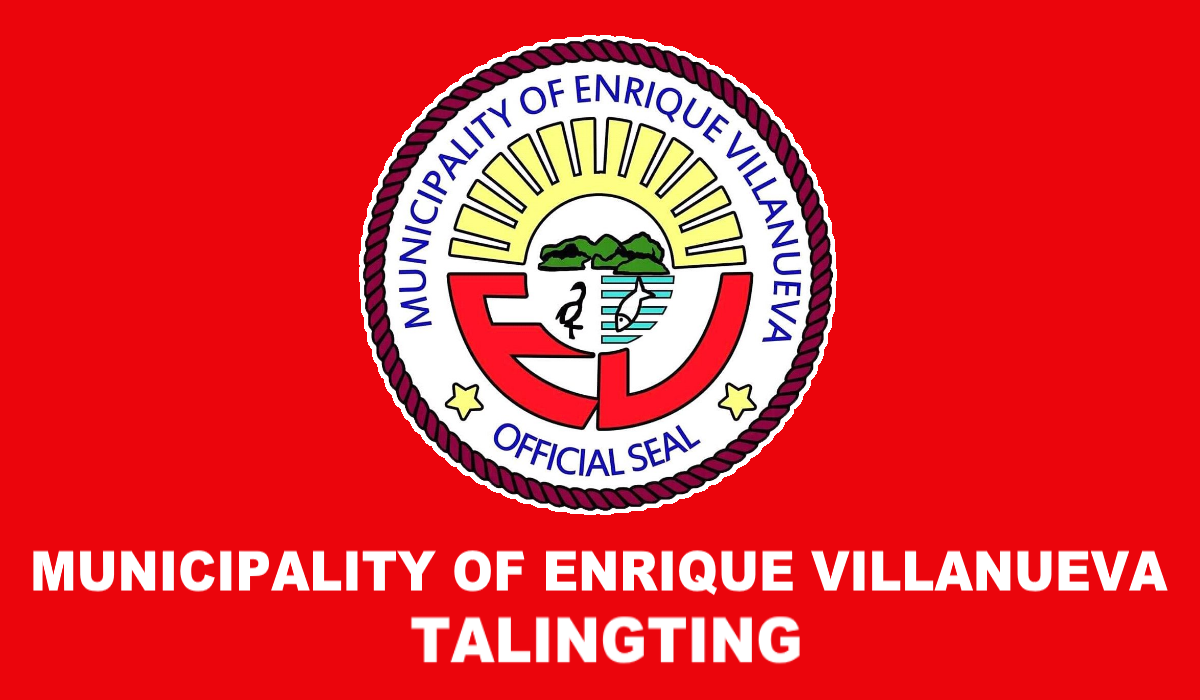
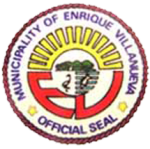
- Flag Seal

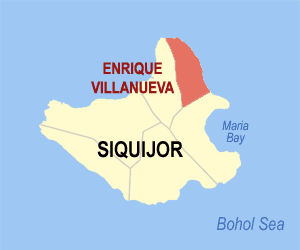
- Map of Siquijor with Enrique Villanueva highlighted
- Interactive map of Enrique Villanueva
- Location within the Philippines
- Coordinates: 9°16′34″N 123°38′49″E
- Country: Philippines
- Region: Negros Island Region
- Province: Siquijor
- District: Lone district
- Founded: April 1924
- Named for: Governor Enrique Cayetano Villanueva y Teves
- Barangays: 14 (see Barangays)

Government
  - Type: Sangguniang Bayan
  - Mayor: Ruth B. Aque (PFP)
  - Vice Mayor: Gerold V. Pal-ing (PFP)
  - Representative: Zaldy Villa (Lakas)
  - Municipal Council: Members: Jesus L. Suminguit, Jr.; Sherwin L. Patay; Porferio C. Inguito, Jr.; Abner E. Lomongo; Jaime S. Tuale; Renna Fern A. Quebec; Leonardo P. Paculba; Aldwin S. Magsalay
  - Electorate: 6,035 voters (2025)

Area
  - Total: 28.60 km^{2} (11.04 sq mi)
- Elevation: 26 m (85 ft)
- Highest elevation: 602 m (1,975 ft)
- Lowest elevation: 0 m (0 ft)

Population (2024 census)
  - Total: 6,965
  - Density: 243.5/km^{2} (630.7/sq mi)
  - Households: 1,653

Economy
  - Income class: 5th municipal income class
  - Poverty incidence: 5.32% (2023)
  - Revenue: ₱ 78.22 million (2024)
  - Assets: ₱ 197.5 million (2024)
  - Expenditure: ₱ 23.6 million (2024)
  - Liabilities: ₱ 30.35 million (2024)

Service provider
  - Electricity: Province of Siquijor Electric Cooperative (PROSIELCO)
- Time zone: UTC+8 (PST)
- ZIP code: 6230
- PSGC: 0706101000
- IDD : area code: +63 (0)35
- Native languages: Cebuano; Tagalog
- Patron saint: Our Lady of Mount Carmel

Enrique Villanueva, officially the Municipality of Enrique Villanueva (Cebuano: Lungsod sa Enrique Villanueva; Tagalog: Bayan ng Enrique Villanueva, Known Locally as Talingting), is a municipality in the province of Siquijor, Philippines. According to the 2024 census, it has a population of 6,965 people.

The town is named after Enrique Cayetano Villanueva y Teves, a former Governor of Negros Oriental. Enrique Villanueva is 22 kilometres (14 mi) from the provincial capital Siquijor.

== Geography ==
=== Barangays ===
Enrique Villanueva is politically subdivided into 14 barangays. Each barangay consists of puroks and some have sitios.

PSGC	Barangay	Population			±% p.a.	
		2024		2010		
076101001	Balolong	2.1%	145	149	▾	−0.19%
076101002	Bino‑ongan	7.2%	498	438	▴	0.89%
076101003	Bitaug	14.5%	1,012	828	▴	1.39%
076101004	Bolot	2.9%	202	137	▴	2.71%
076101005	Camogao	5.1%	352	313	▴	0.81%
076101006	Cangmangki	6.4%	449	412	▴	0.59%
076101007	Libo	13.5%	938	798	▴	1.12%
076101008	Lomangcapan	10.7%	744	621	▴	1.25%
076101009	Lotloton	7.1%	492	467	▴	0.36%
076101010	Manan‑ao	2.6%	180	135	▴	2.00%
076101011	Olave	3.0%	208	191	▴	0.59%
076101012	Parian	3.0%	206	216	▾	−0.33%
076101013	Poblacion	7.6%	530	464	▴	0.92%
076101014	Tulapos	12.0%	834	803	▴	0.26%
	Total		6,965	5,972	▴	1.06%

=== Climate ===
Climate data for Enrique Villanueva, Siquijor
Month	Jan	Feb	Mar	Apr	May	Jun	Jul	Aug	Sep	Oct	Nov	Dec	Year
Mean daily maximum °C (°F)	30 (86)	30 (86)	31 (88)	33 (91)	32 (90)	31 (88)	30 (86)	30 (86)	30 (86)	30 (86)	30 (86)	30 (86)	31 (87)
Mean daily minimum °C (°F)	22 (72)	22 (72)	22 (72)	23 (73)	24 (75)	25 (77)	24 (75)	24 (75)	24 (75)	24 (75)	23 (73)	23 (73)	23 (74)
Average precipitation mm (inches)	26 (1.0)	22 (0.9)	28 (1.1)	41 (1.6)	95 (3.7)	136 (5.4)	147 (5.8)	126 (5.0)	132 (5.2)	150 (5.9)	98 (3.9)	46 (1.8)	1,047 (41.3)
Average rainy days	7.5	6.7	8.9	10.4	21.6	25.6	26.3	25.0	24.1	26.2	19.2	12.1	213.6
Source: Meteoblue (modeled/calculated data, not measured locally)

== Demographics ==
Population census of Enrique Villanueva

Year	Pop.	±% p.a.
1939	4,516	—
1948	4,472	−0.11%
1960	4,206	−0.51%
1970	4,239	+0.08%
1975	4,661	+1.92%

Year	Pop.	±% p.a.
1980	4,770	+0.46%
1990	4,733	−0.08%
1995	4,868	+0.53%
2000	5,364	+2.10%
2007	5,878	+1.27%

Year	Pop.	±% p.a.
2010	5,972	+0.58%
2015	6,104	+0.42%
2020	6,790	+2.27%
2024	6,965	+0.61%

Source: Philippine Statistics Authority

== Economy ==
Poverty incidence of Enrique Villanueva (%)

Source: Philippine Statistics Authority

== Education ==
Enrique Villanueva National High School

The public schools in the town of Enrique Villanueva are administered by one school district under the Schools Division of Siquijor.

Elementary schools:

- Bitaug Elementary School — Bitaug
- Enrique Villanueva Central Elementary School — Tulapos
- Libo Elementary School — Libo
- Roxas Elementary School — Cangmangki

High schools:

- Enrique Villanueva National High School — Tulapos

== Gallery ==
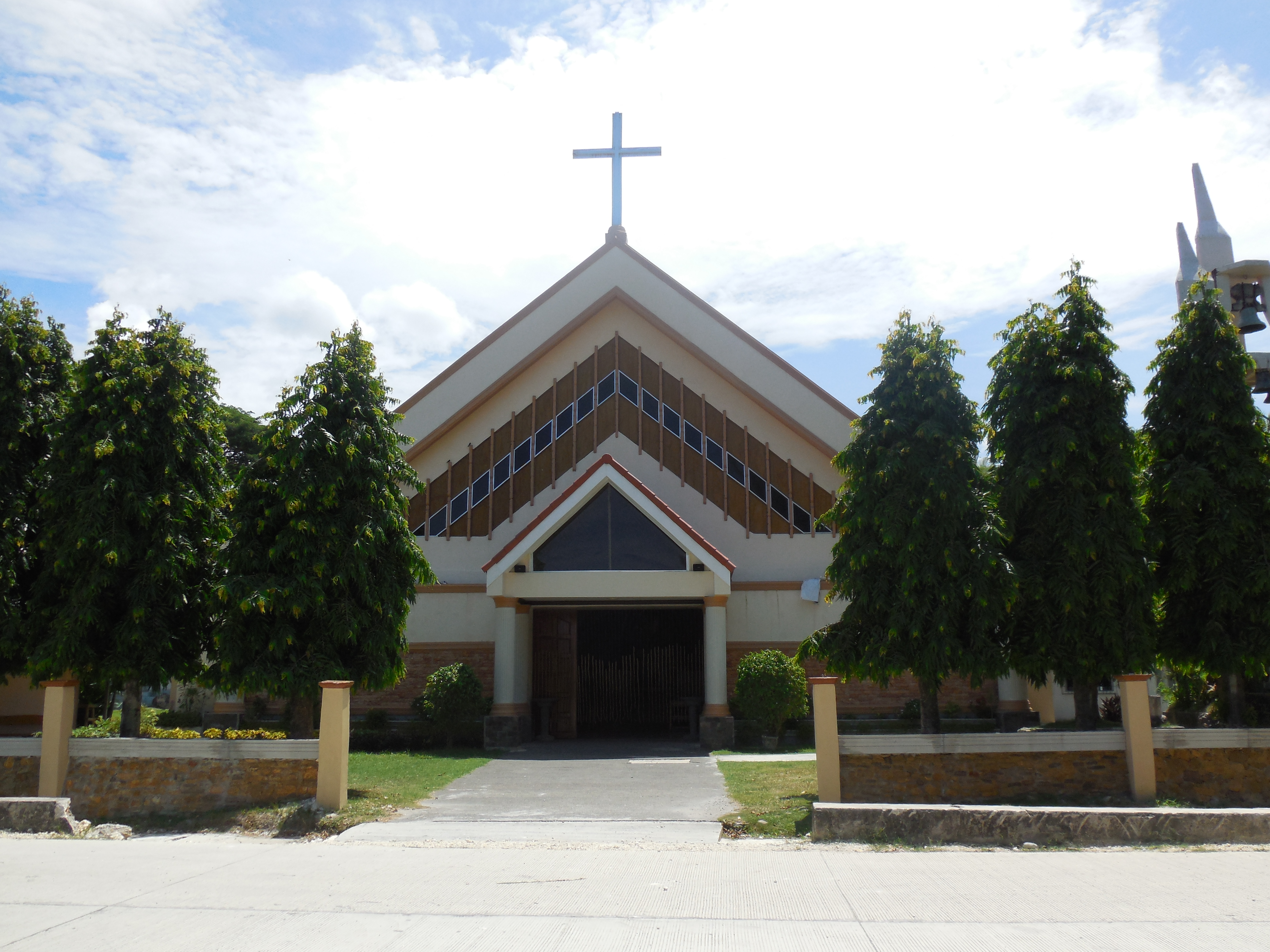
Mount Carmel Parish Church

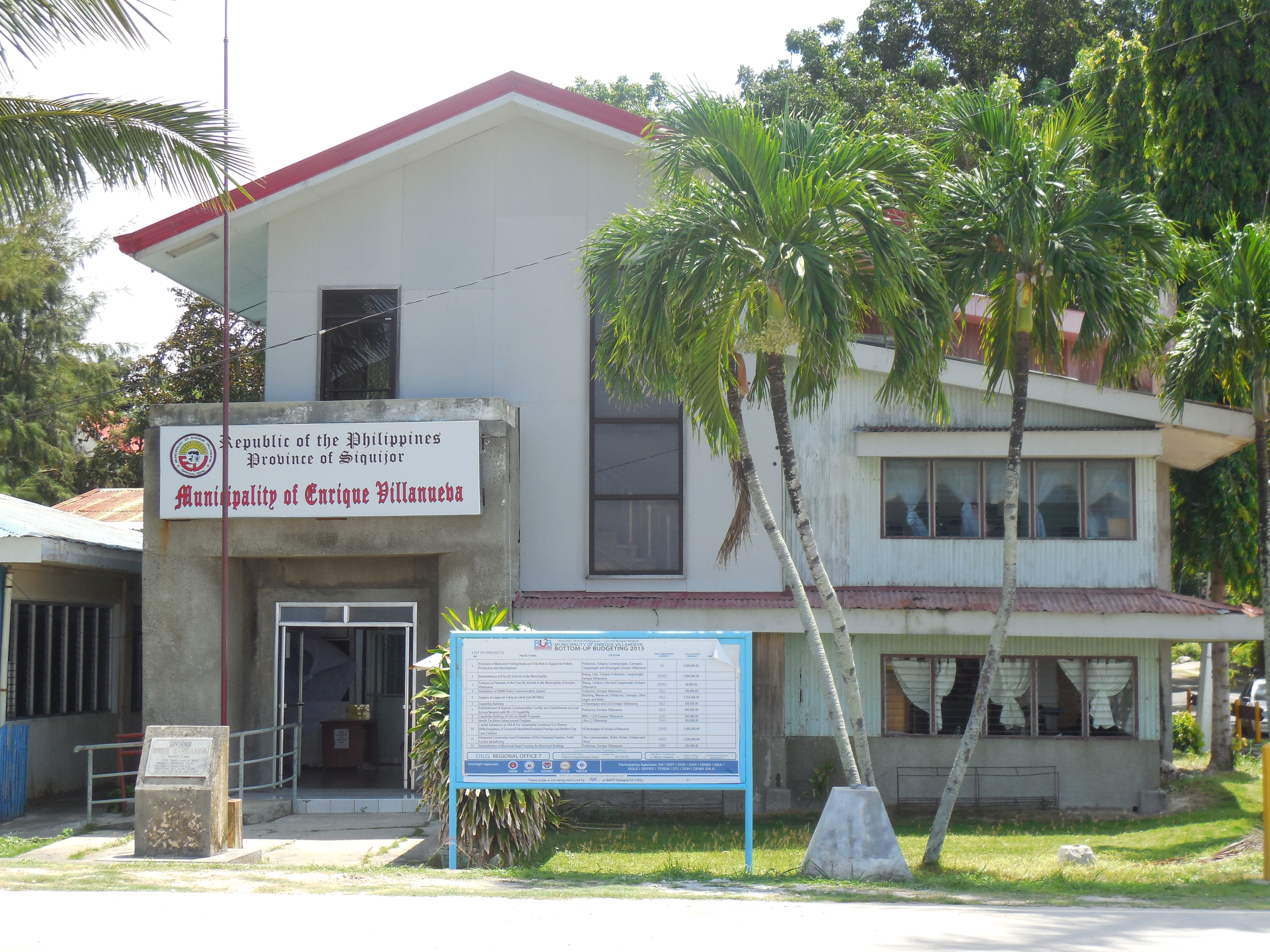
Enrique Villanueva Town Hall
