= Siquijor's at-large congressional district =

District of the Philippines

- Constituency for the House of Representatives of the Philippines
- Location of Siquijor within the Philippines
- Province: Siquijor
- Region: Negros Island Region
- Population: 103,395 (2020)
- Electorate: 81,404 (2025)
- Area: 337.49 km^{2} (130.31 sq mi)

Current constituency
- Created: 1984
- Representative: Zaldy Villa
- Political party: PFP
- Congressional bloc: TBD

Siquijor's at-large congressional district is the provincewide electoral district in Siquijor, Philippines. The province has been represented in the country's national legislatures since 1984. It first elected a representative at-large during the 1984 Philippine parliamentary election following the restoration of provincial and city district representation in the Batasang Pambansa where Siquijor had previously been included in the regionwide representation of Central Visayas (Region VII) for the interim parliament. The province, created by the 1971 separation of Siquijor Island from Negros Oriental, was formerly represented as part of that province's 2nd district in earlier legislatures. Since the 1987 restoration of Congress following the ratification of a new constitution, Siquijor has been entitled to one member in the House of Representatives. It is currently represented in the 20th Congress by Zaldy Villa of the Partido Federal ng Pilipinas (PFP).

== Representation history ==
#	Image	Member	Term of office		Batasang Pambansa	Party	Electoral history
#	Image	Member	Start	End	Batasang Pambansa	Party	Electoral history
=== Siquijor's at-large district for the Regular Batasang Pambansa ===
District created February 1, 1984 from Region VII's at-large district.
1		Manolito L. Asok	July 23, 1984	March 25, 1986	2nd	KBL	Elected in 1984.
#	Image	Member	Term of office		Congress	Party	Electoral history
#	Image	Member	Start	End	Congress	Party	Electoral history
=== Siquijor's at-large district for the House of Representatives of the Philippines ===
District re-created February 2, 1987.
2		Orlando B. Fua	June 30, 1987	June 30, 1998	8th	Lakas ng Bansa (GAD)	Elected in 1987.
2		Orlando B. Fua	June 30, 1987	June 30, 1998	9th	LDP	Re-elected in 1992.
2		Orlando B. Fua	June 30, 1987	June 30, 1998	10th	Lakas	Re-elected in 1995.
3		Orlando A. Fua Jr.	June 30, 1998	June 30, 2007	11th	NPC	Elected in 1998.
3		Orlando A. Fua Jr.	June 30, 1998	June 30, 2007	12th	Lakas	Re-elected in 2001.
3		Orlando A. Fua Jr.	June 30, 1998	June 30, 2007	13th	Lakas	Re-elected in 2004.
(2)		Orlando B. Fua	June 30, 2007	June 30, 2013	14th	Lakas	Elected in 2007.
(2)		Orlando B. Fua	June 30, 2007	June 30, 2013	15th	Lakas	Re-elected in 2010.
4		Marie Anne S. Pernes	June 30, 2013	June 30, 2016	16th	Liberal	Elected in 2013.
5		Ramon Vicente Rocamora	June 30, 2016	June 30, 2019	17th	Independent	Elected in 2016.
5		Ramon Vicente Rocamora	June 30, 2016	June 30, 2019	17th	PDP–Laban	Elected in 2016.
6		Jake Vincent S. Villa	June 30, 2019	June 30, 2022	18th	NPC	Elected in 2019.
7		Zaldy S. Villa	June 30, 2022	Incumbent	19th	PDP–Laban	Elected in 2022.
7		Zaldy S. Villa	June 30, 2022	Incumbent	20th	Lakas	Re-elected in 2025.
7		Zaldy S. Villa	June 30, 2022	Incumbent	20th	PFP	Re-elected in 2025.

== Election results ==
=== 2025 ===
Candidate	Party	Votes	%
Zaldy Villa (incumbent)	Lakas–CMD	41,221	56.98
Mimi Quezon	Aksyon Demokratiko	30,858	42.66
Johnney Ensong	Independent	264	0.36
Total		72,343	100.00
Valid votes		72,343	96.77
Invalid/blank votes		2,415	3.23
Total votes		74,758	100.00
Registered voters/turnout		81,404	91.84
Lakas–CMD hold			
Source: Commission on Elections

=== 2022 ===
Philippine House of Representatives election at Siquijor's Lone district
Party	Candidate	Votes	%
PDP–Laban	Zaldy Villa	33,989	49.19%
Aksyon	Orlando Fua Jr.	26,722	38.67%
Independent	Guido Ganhinhin	1,660	2.40%
Independent	Joy Lopes de Andrade	474	0.69%
PROMDI	Armin Demetillo	310	0.45%
Valid ballots		63,155	91.39%
Invalid or blank votes		5,948	8.61%
Total votes		69,103	100.00%

=== 2019 ===
Philippine House of Representatives election at Siquijor's Lone district
Party	Candidate	Votes	%
NPC	Jake Vincent Villa	26,840	45.46%
PDP–Laban	Ramon Vicente Antonio Rocamora	18,775	31.80%
Independent	Orlando Fua Jr.	10,348	17.53%
PFP	Marie Anne Pernes	2,849	4.83%
Independent	Demosthenes Fernandez	223	0.38%
Total votes		59,035	100.00%
NPC gain from PDP–Laban			

=== 2016 ===
Philippine House of Representatives election at Siquijor's Lone district
Party	Candidate	Votes	%
Independent	Ramon Vicente Antonio Rocamora	22,125	40.61%
Liberal	Marie Anne Pernes	18,216	33.43%
UNA	Orlando Fua Jr.	9,695	17.79%
Independent	Carl Mark Ganhinhin	4,439	8.14%
Total votes		54,475	100.00%
Independent gain from Liberal			

=== 2013 ===
Philippine House of Representatives election at Siquijor's district
Party	Candidate	Votes	%
Liberal	Marie Anne Pernes	28,395	51.66
Lakas	Orlando Fua, Jr.	23,671	43.06
Margin of victory		4,724	8.59%
Invalid or blank votes		2,900	5.28
Total votes		54,966	100.00
Liberal gain from Lakas			

=== 2010 ===
Philippine House of Representatives election at Siquijor
Party	Candidate	Votes	%
Lakas–Kampi	Orlando Fua, Sr.	33,509	66.52
PDSP	Fernando Avanzado	10,094	20.04
Liberal	Grace Sumalpong	6,565	13.03
Independent	Jesus Flor	206	0.42
Valid ballots		50,374	95.29
Invalid or blank votes		2,489	4.71
Total votes		52,863	100.00
Lakas–Kampi gain from PDSP			

== See also ==
- Legislative districts of Siquijor
