= Legislative districts of Siquijor =

Legislative district of the Philippines

The legislative districts of Siquijor is the representations of the province of Siquijor in the various national legislatures of the Philippines. The province is currently represented in the lower house of the Congress of the Philippines through its lone congressional district.

== History ==
From 1907 the sub-province Siquijor was represented as part of the second district of Negros Oriental. Negros Oriental and the sub-province of Siquijor were represented in the Interim Batasang Pambansa as part of Region VII from 1978 to 1984.

Siquijor's first representative was elected in 1984, after it was established as a regular province on September 17, 1971 through Republic Act No. 6398. The province elected one representative to the Regular Batasang Pambansa from 1984 to 1986. Siquijor retained its lone district under the new Constitution which took effect on February 7, 1987, and elected its member to the restored House of Representatives starting that same year.

== Lone District ==
- Population (2020): 103,395

Period	Representative
8th Congress; 1987–1992	Orlando B. Fua
9th Congress; 1992–1995	Orlando B. Fua
10th Congress; 1995–1998	Orlando B. Fua
11th Congress; 1998–2001	Orlando A. Fua, Jr.
12th Congress; 2001–2004	Orlando A. Fua, Jr.
13th Congress; 2004–2007	Orlando A. Fua, Jr.
14th Congress; 2007–2010	Orlando B. Fua
15th Congress; 2010–2013	Orlando B. Fua
16th Congress; 2013–2016	Marie Anne S. Pernes
17th Congress; 2016–2019	Ramon V.A. M. Rocamora
18th Congress; 2019–2022	Jake Vincent S. Villa
19th Congress; 2022–2025	Zaldy S. Villa

== At-large (defunct) ==
Period	Representative
Regular Batasang Pambansa; 1984–1986	Manolito Asok

== See also ==
- Legislative districts of Negros Oriental
