= Zaldy Villa =

Filipino politician

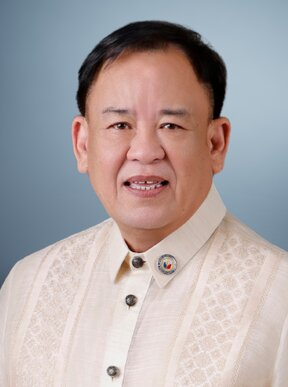
- Official portrait, 2025

Member of the Philippine House of Representatives from Siquijor's at-large district
- Incumbent
- Assumed office June 30, 2022
- Preceded by: Jake Vincent Villa

Governor of Siquijor
- In office June 30, 2013 – June 30, 2022
- Vice Governor: Dingdong Avanzado (2013–2016); Mei Ling Quezon (2016–2022)
- Preceded by: Orlando Fua, Jr.
- Succeeded by: Jake Vincent Villa

Personal details
- Born: Zaldy Samson Villa; September 3, 1959 (age 66) Larena, Siquijor, Philippines
- Party: PFP (2026–present)
- Other political affiliations: Lakas (2023–2026); PDP–Laban (2016–2023); Liberal (2012–2016)
- Spouse: Lyn Sarmiento
- Occupation: Politician; businessman

Zaldy "Jecoy" Samson Villa (born September 3, 1959) is a Filipino businessman and politician who has served as the representative for Siquijor's at-large district since 2022. He previously served as the governor of Siquijor from 2013 to 2022.

== Political career ==
=== Governor of Siquijor ===
Villa was elected governor of the island province of Siquijor in 2013 alongside his running mate, singer Dingdong Avanzado. Villa eventually served three terms as governor until 2022.

=== House of Representatives ===
In 2022, Villa was elected congressman of Siquijor's lone district, succeeding his son Jake Vincent Villa and defeating Orlando Fua Jr. as well as three other candidates.

In November 2023, Villa left PDP-Laban to join the Lakas–CMD party. On February 5, 2025, Villa was among the 95 Lakas–CMD members who voted to impeach vice president Sara Duterte.

== Electoral history ==
Electoral history of Zaldy Villa
Year	Office	Party	Votes received				Result
Year	Office	Party	Total	%	P.	Swing	Result
2013	Governor of Siquijor	Liberal	30,143	56.17%	1st	—N/a	Won
2016	Governor of Siquijor	Liberal	31,708	60.02%	1st	+3.85	Won
2019	Governor of Siquijor	PDP–Laban	41,155	74.61%	1st	+14.59	Won
2022	Representative (Siquijor)	PDP–Laban	33,989	49.19%	1st	—N/a	Won
2025	Representative (Siquijor)	Lakas	41,221	55.14%	1st	+5.95	Won
