= Siquijor, Siquijor =

Capital of Siquijor, Philippines

Siquijor
- Municipality
- Municipality of Siquijor
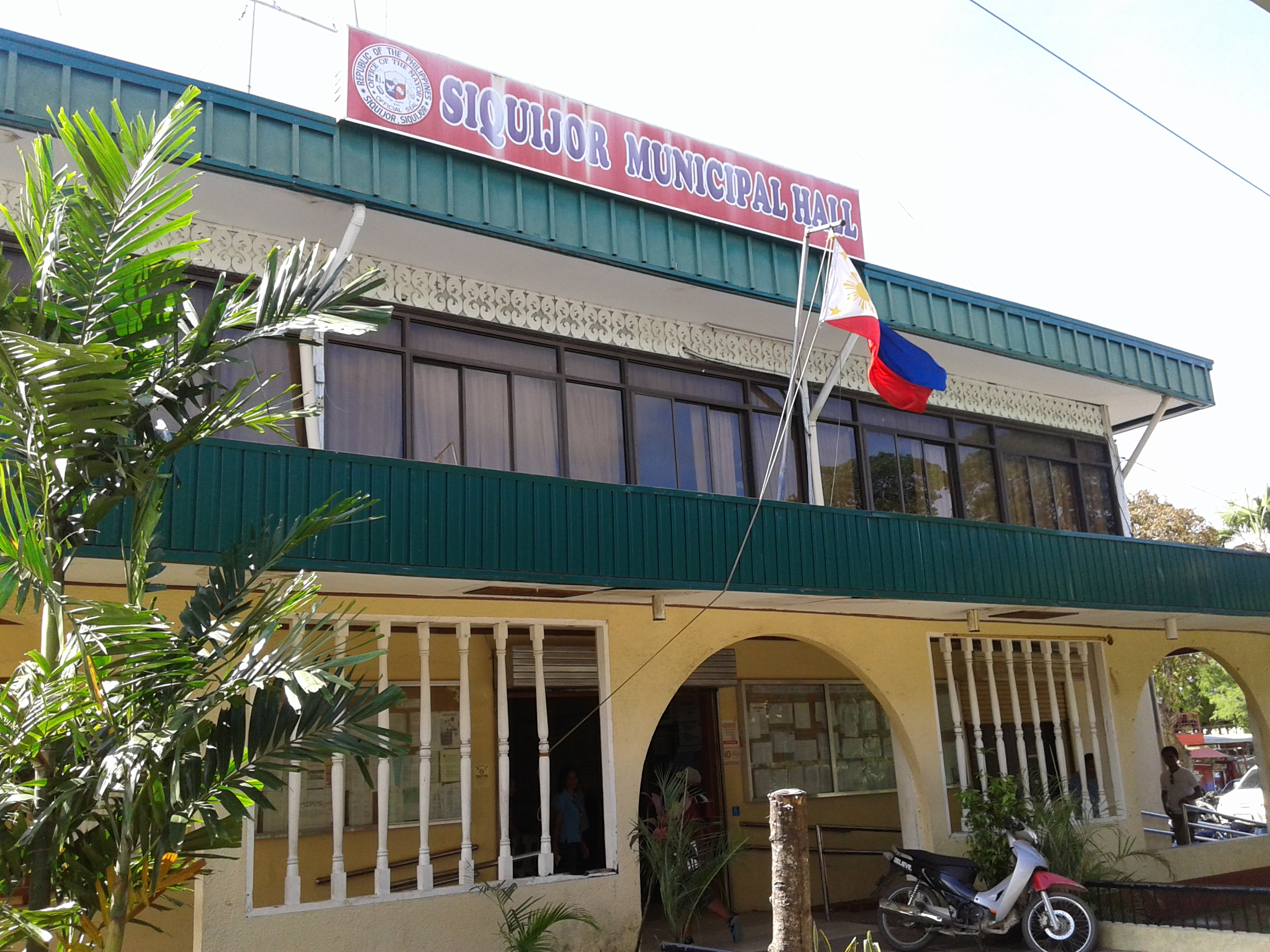
- Saint Francis of Assisi Parish Church Siquijor Municipal Town Hall Coastline

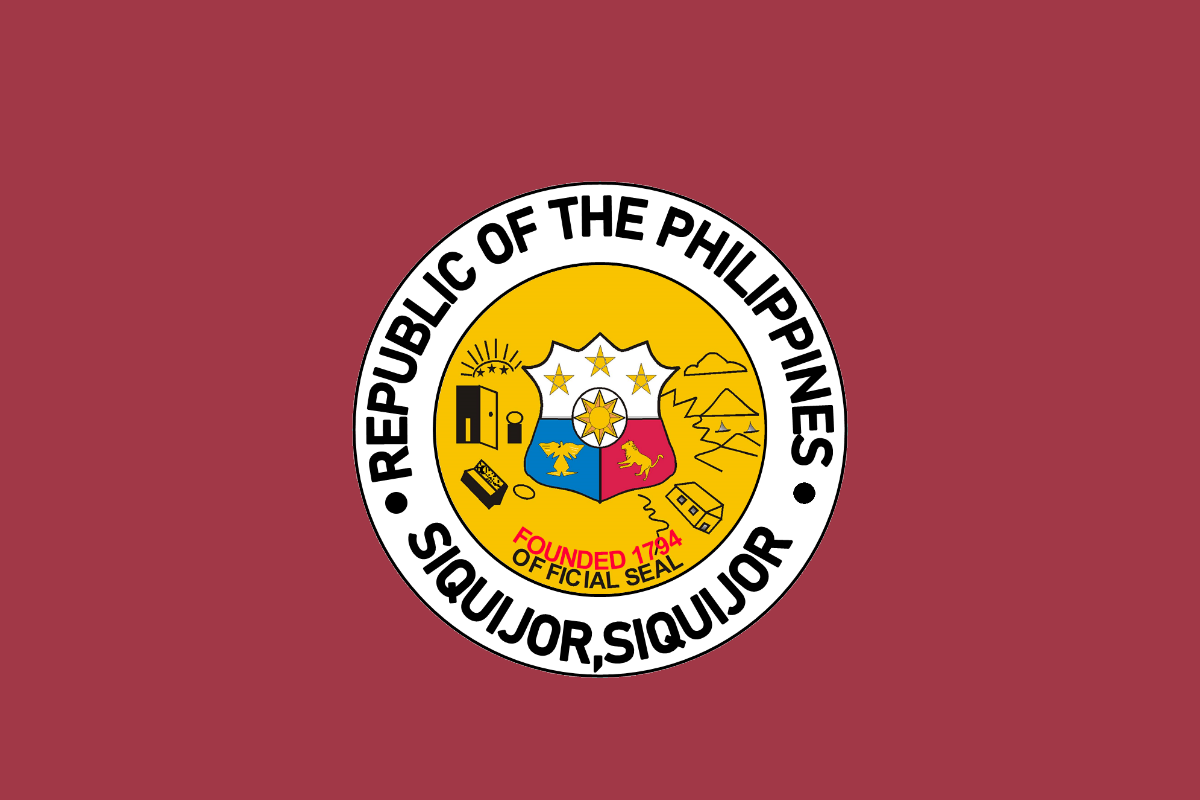
- Flag

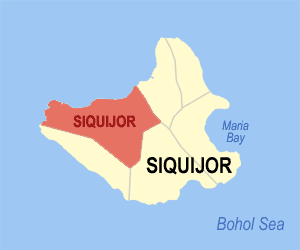
- Map of Siquijor with Siquijor highlighted
- Interactive map of Siquijor
- Location within the Philippines
- Coordinates: 9°12′54″N 123°30′50″E
- Country: Philippines
- Region: Negros Island Region
- Province: Siquijor
- District: Lone district
- Barangays: 42 (see Barangays)

Government
  - Type: Sangguniang Bayan
  - Mayor: Adam S. Duhaylungsod
  - Vice Mayor: Jayson P. Dawami (PFP)
  - Representative: Zaldy Villa (Lakas)
  - Municipal Council: Members: Eric V. Duhaylungsod; James Sidney C. Olpoc; Pat Brian D. Cortes; Sierilyn G. Aso; Andrei Joseph O. Cortes; Eduard A. Batutay; Jim Joe M. Ambalong; Artemio K. Alvarico
  - Electorate: 22,640 voters (2025)

Area
  - Total: 90.70 km^{2} (35.02 sq mi)
- Elevation: 29 m (95 ft)
- Highest elevation: 601 m (1,972 ft)
- Lowest elevation: 0 m (0 ft)

Population (2024 census)
  - Total: 30,215
  - Density: 333.1/km^{2} (862.8/sq mi)
  - Households: 7,358

Economy
  - Income class: 3rd municipal income class
  - Poverty incidence: 4.4% (2023)
  - Revenue: ₱ 177.6 million (2024)
  - Assets: ₱ 574 million (2024)
  - Expenditure: ₱ 84.58 million (2024)
  - Liabilities: ₱ 78.43 million (2024)

Service provider
  - Electricity: Province of Siquijor Electric Cooperative (PROSIELCO)
- Time zone: UTC+8 (PST)
- ZIP code: 6225
- PSGC: 076106000
- IDD : area code: +63 (0)35
- Native languages: Cebuano; Tagalog
- Patron saint: Saint Francis of Assisi

Siquijor, officially the Municipality of Siquijor (Cebuano: Lungsod sa Siquijor; Tagalog: Bayan ng Siquijor), is a municipality and titular capital of the province of Siquijor, Philippines. According to the 2024 census, it has a population of 30,215 people.

== History ==
While Spanish priests arrived in Siquijor as early as 1780, it was not until 1794 that the town became a municipality, the same year the parish was established.

== Geography ==
=== Barangays ===
Siquijor is politically subdivided into 42 barangays. Each barangay consists of puroks and some have sitios.

PSGC	Barangay	Population			±% p.a.	
		2024		2010		
076106001	Banban	2.6%	796	778	▴	0.16%
076106002	Bolos	0.9%	272	252	▴	0.53%
076106003	Caipilan	4.0%	1,210	1,000	▴	1.32%
076106004	Caitican	1.9%	563	444	▴	1.65%
076106005	Calalinan	2.9%	862	675	▴	1.70%
076106007	Canal	1.8%	542	433	▴	1.56%
076106008	Candanay Norte	3.4%	1,016	886	▴	0.95%
076106009	Candanay Sur	3.4%	1,034	885	▴	1.08%
076106010	Cang‑adieng	1.0%	297	256	▴	1.03%
076106011	Cang‑agong	3.3%	994	879	▴	0.85%
076106012	Cang‑alwang	2.9%	882	731	▴	1.30%
076106013	Cang‑asa	3.7%	1,104	863	▴	1.71%
076106006	Cang‑atuyom	1.3%	400	307	▴	1.84%
076106014	Cang‑inte	0.7%	212	215	▾	−0.10%
076106015	Cang‑isad	0.6%	186	142	▴	1.88%
076106016	Canghunoghunog	1.0%	290	247	▴	1.11%
076106017	Cangmatnog	0.7%	225	185	▴	1.36%
076106018	Cangmohao	0.8%	234	177	▴	1.94%
076106019	Cantabon	1.6%	482	497	▾	−0.21%
076106020	Caticugan	3.8%	1,150	842	▴	2.17%
076106021	Dumanhog	2.2%	668	557	▴	1.26%
076106022	Ibabao	1.0%	299	312	▾	−0.29%
076106023	Lambojon	1.0%	291	298	▾	−0.16%
076106024	Luyang	2.4%	734	704	▴	0.29%
076106025	Luzong	1.6%	482	445	▴	0.55%
076106026	Olo	2.7%	829	754	▴	0.65%
076106027	Pangi	5.8%	1,767	1,491	▴	1.18%
076106028	Panlautan	0.9%	270	224	▴	1.29%
076106029	Pasihagon	4.2%	1,258	1,003	▴	1.57%
076106030	Pili	1.4%	437	353	▴	1.48%
076106031	Poblacion	4.9%	1,471	1,596	▾	−0.56%
076106032	Polangyuta	3.0%	908	781	▴	1.04%
076106033	Ponong	2.9%	881	828	▴	0.43%
076106034	Sabang	1.7%	521	554	▾	−0.42%
076106035	San Antonio	2.5%	753	773	▾	−0.18%
076106036	Songculan	1.0%	302	245	▴	1.45%
076106037	Tacdog	1.9%	565	509	▴	0.72%
076106038	Tacloban	2.3%	693	636	▴	0.59%
076106039	Tambisan	2.5%	762	684	▴	0.75%
076106040	Tebjong	0.7%	222	209	▴	0.42%
076106041	Tinago	4.1%	1,235	971	▴	1.67%
076106042	Tongo	2.7%	816	610	▴	2.02%
	Total		30,215	25,231	▴	1.25%

=== Climate ===
Climate data for Siquijor, Siquijor
Month	Jan	Feb	Mar	Apr	May	Jun	Jul	Aug	Sep	Oct	Nov	Dec	Year
Mean daily maximum °C (°F)	29 (84)	30 (86)	31 (88)	32 (90)	31 (88)	30 (86)	30 (86)	30 (86)	30 (86)	29 (84)	29 (84)	29 (84)	30 (86)
Mean daily minimum °C (°F)	22 (72)	22 (72)	22 (72)	23 (73)	24 (75)	24 (75)	24 (75)	24 (75)	24 (75)	24 (75)	23 (73)	23 (73)	23 (74)
Average precipitation mm (inches)	26 (1.0)	22 (0.9)	28 (1.1)	41 (1.6)	95 (3.7)	136 (5.4)	147 (5.8)	126 (5.0)	132 (5.2)	150 (5.9)	98 (3.9)	46 (1.8)	1,047 (41.3)
Average rainy days	7.5	6.7	8.9	10.4	21.6	25.6	26.3	25.0	24.1	26.2	19.2	12.1	213.6
Source: Meteoblue (modeled/calculated data, not measured locally)

== Demographics ==
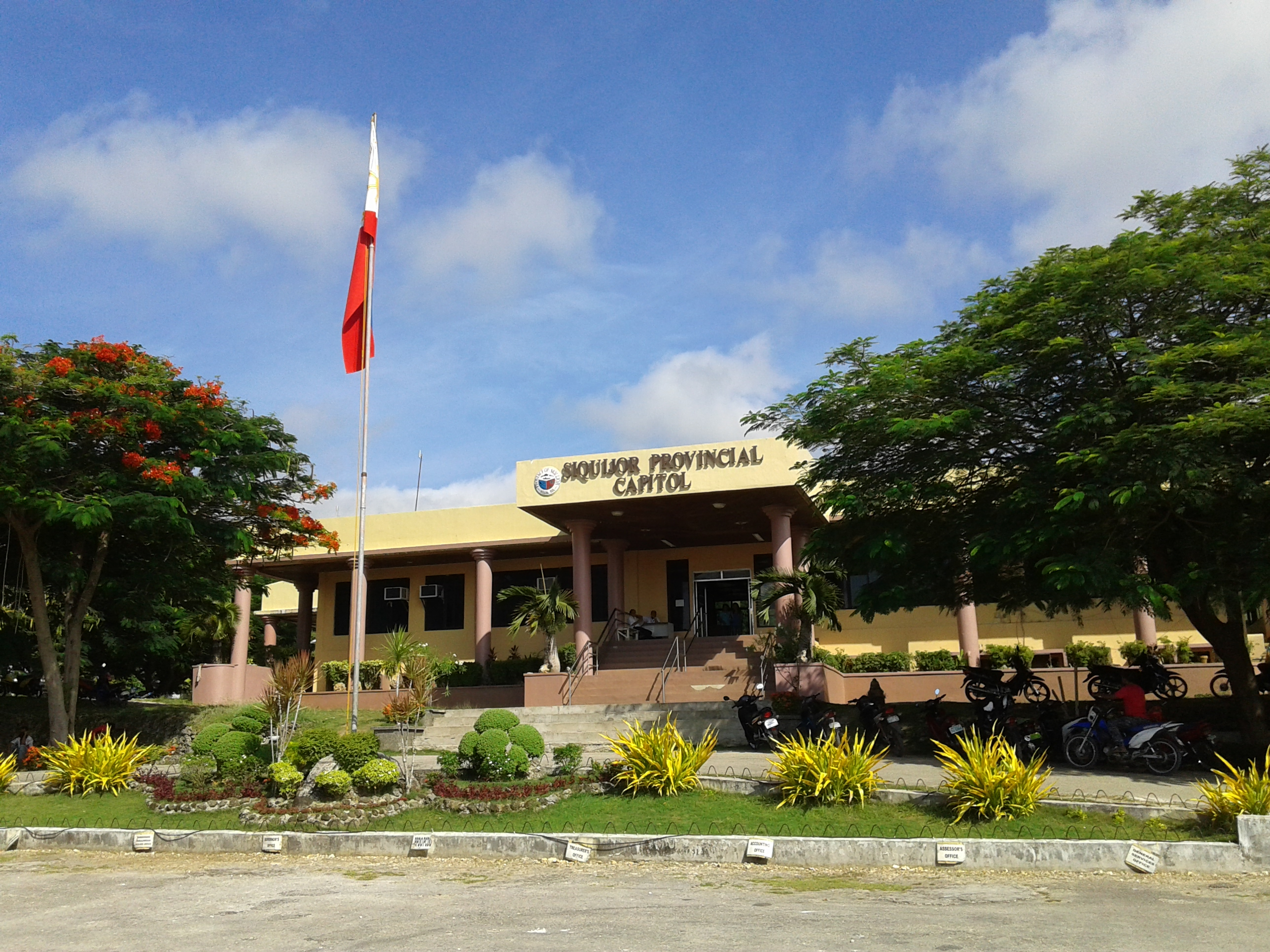
As the Province of Siquijor's provincial capital, the Siquijor Provincial Capitol is located in the town.

Population census of Siquijor

Year	Pop.	±% p.a.
1903	12,116	—
1918	15,237	+1.54%
1939	15,200	−0.01%
1948	14,681	−0.39%
1960	16,515	+0.99%
1970	15,327	−0.74%
1975	16,949	+2.04%
1980	17,533	+0.68%

Year	Pop.	±% p.a.
1990	18,360	+0.46%
1995	18,860	+0.50%
2000	21,150	+2.49%
2007	23,673	+1.57%
2010	25,231	+2.35%
2015	26,861	+1.20%
2020	28,915	+1.56%
2024	30,215	+1.06%

Source: Philippine Statistics Authority

== Economy ==
Poverty incidence of Siquijor (%)

Source: Philippine Statistics Authority

The major economic activities include farming, fishing, woodcraft and furniture making, basket making, peanut processing, banana chips processing, and bakery.

== Transportation ==
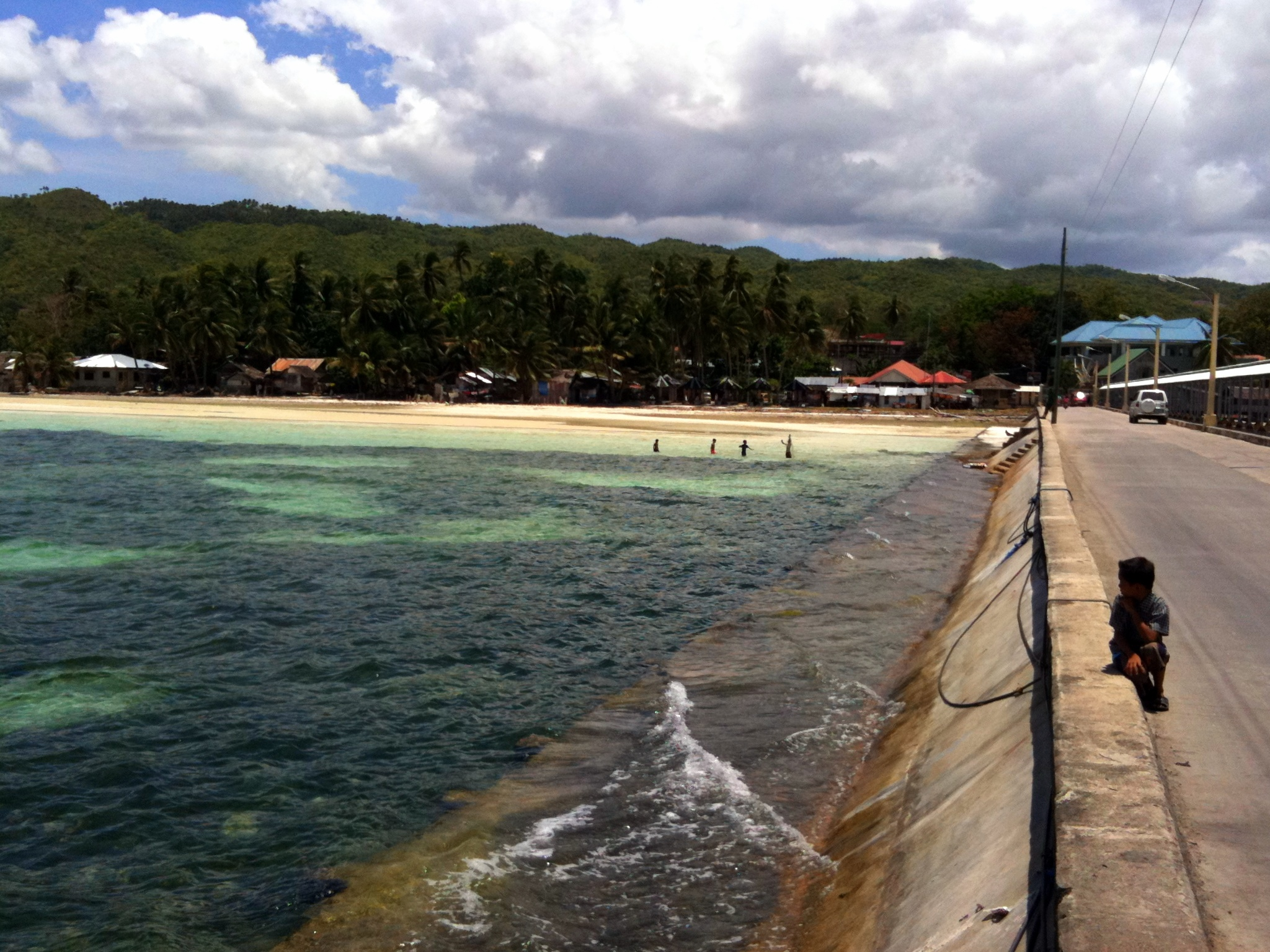
Port of Siquijor

Although Larena has the larger port on the island, the Port of Siquijor also provides daily ferry services. Montenegro Lines and Aleson Shipping Lines provide service to Dumaguete in Negros Oriental. OceanJet provides service to Dumaguete, Tagbilaran in Bohol, and Cebu City.

The island's only aerodrome, Siquijor Airport, is located in barangay Cang‑alwang. The airport is used by smaller private planes and does not serve commercial flights.

== Education ==
The public schools in the town of Siquijor are administered by two school districts under the Schools Division of Siquijor.

High schools:

- Banban National High School — Banban
- Cang-alwang National High School — Tongo
- Ponong High School — Ponong
- San Antonio National High School — San Antonio
- Siquijor Provincial Science High School — Caipilan

Integrated schools:

- Siquijor Integrated School (formerly Siquijor CES) — Polangyuta

Private schools:

- Assisi High School of Siquijor — Sta. Fe Street, Poblacion
- Quezon Memorial Institute of Siquijor — Canal
