= 2022 Siquijor local elections =

Philippine election

2022 Siquijor gubernatorial election
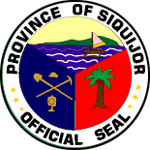
- May 9, 2022
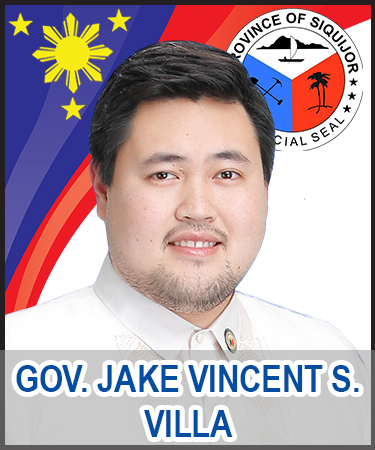
| | | AKSYON |
| Nominee | Jake Vincent Villa | Dean Villa |
| Party | NPC | Aksyon |
| Running mate | Mei Ling Quezon-Brown | Edwin Yu |
| Popular vote | 32,615 | 31,388 |
| Percentage | 47.20% | 45.42% |
Governor before election
Zaldy Villa
PDP–Laban
Elected Governor
Jake Vincent Villa
NPC

Local elections in Siquijor were held on May 9, 2022 as part of the 2022 Philippine general election. Voters elected all local posts in the province: town mayors, vice mayors, town councilors, as well as members of the Sangguniang Panlalawigan - three in each of the province's two administrative districts, the governor, vice governor, and one representative for lone district of Siquijor.

The province's election turnout is 88.08%, (162 election returns) equivalent to 69,103 out of 78,458 total registered voters.

== Provincial elections ==
=== Governor ===
Zaldy Villa is the incumbent but term-limited. He ran for district representative and won.

Siquijor gubernatorial election
| Party | Candidate | Votes | % |
|---|---|---|---|
| NPC | Jake Vincent Villa | 32,615 | 47.20% |
| Aksyon | Dean Villa | 31,388 | 45.42% |
| Valid ballots | | 64,003 | 92.62% |
| Invalid or blank votes | | 5,100 | 7.38% |
| Total votes | | 69,103 | 100.00% |

==== By Municipality ====
| Municipality | Jake Vincent Villa | | Dean Villa | |
| Municipality | Votes | % | Votes | % |
|---|---|---|---|---|
| Enrique Villanueva | 2,402 | 53.34 | 2,101 | 46.66 |
| Larena | 3,885 | 40.08 | 5,808 | 59.92 |
| Lazi | 6,411 | 50.03 | 6,403 | 49.97 |
| Maria | 4,930 | 55.83 | 3,900 | 44.17 |
| San Juan | 4,886 | 49.80 | 4,926 | 50.20 |
| Siquijor | 10,101 | 55.04 | 8,250 | 44.96 |
| TOTAL | 32,615 | 47.20 | 31,388 | 45.42 |

=== Vice-Governor ===
Mei Ling Quezon-Brown is the incumbent.

Siquijor vice-gubernatorial election
| Party | Candidate | Votes | % |
|---|---|---|---|
| NPC | Mei Ling Quezon-Brown | 33,932 | 48.32% |
| Aksyon | Edwin Fua Yu | 25,139 | 36.38% |
| Valid ballots | | 58,531 | 84.70% |
| Invalid or blank votes | | 10,572 | 15.30% |
| Total votes | | 69,103 | 100.00% |

==== By Municipality ====
| Municipality | Mei Ling Quezon-Brown | | Edwin Fua Yu | |
| Municipality | Votes | % | Votes | % |
|---|---|---|---|---|
| Enrique Villanueva | 2,308 | 55.43 | 1,856 | 44.57 |
| Larena | 4,095 | 45.39 | 4,927 | 54.61 |
| Lazi | 5,997 | 51.27 | 5,701 | 48.73 |
| Maria | 4,702 | 61.20 | 2,981 | 38.80 |
| San Juan | 4,695 | 52.98 | 4,167 | 47.02 |
| Siquijor | 12,135 | 68.78 | 5,507 | 31.22 |
| TOTAL | 33,932 | 48.32 | 25,139 | 36.38 |

=== Sangguniang Panlalawigan ===
| Party | Votes | % | Seats |
|---|---|---|---|
| Partido Demokratiko Pilipino-Lakas ng Bayan | 93,238 | 57.38 | 5 |
| Aksyon Demokratiko | 47,011 | 28.93 | 1 |
| Partido Federal ng Pilipinas | 22,256 | 13.70 | – |
| Ex officio seats | | | 3 |
| Total | 162,505 | 100.00 | 9 |

==== 1st District ====
- Municipalities: Enrique Villanueva, Larena, Siquijor
- Population (2020): 50,159
- Electorate (2022): 39,184
- Turnout (2022): 34,346 (87.65%)

Parties are as stated in their certificates of candidacy.

Siquijor 1st District Sangguniang Panlalawigan elections
| Party | Candidate | Votes | % |
|---|---|---|---|
| PDP–Laban | Brylle Deeiah Tumarong | 16,166 | 15.69% |
| PDP–Laban | Leonardo Lingcay Jr. | 15,303 | 14.85% |
| PDP–Laban | Erson Digal | 14,910 | 14.47% |
| Aksyon | Evelyn Tumarong | 13,051 | 12.67% |
| PFP | Arturo Pacatang | 12,881 | 12.50% |
| Aksyon | Dindo Larot | 11,504 | 11.16% |
| Valid ballots | | 27,29% | 81.34% |
| Invalid or blank votes | | 6,408 | 18.66% |
| Total votes | | 34,346 | 100.00% |

==== 2nd District ====
- Municipalities: Maria, Lazi, San Juan
- Population (2020): 53,236
- Electorate (2022): 43,406
- Turnout (2022): 38,369 (88.40%)

Parties are as stated in their certificates of candidacy.

Siquijor 2nd District Sangguniang Panlalawigan elections
| Party | Candidate | Votes | % |
|---|---|---|---|
| PDP–Laban | Dindo Tumala | 17,021 | 14.79% |
| PDP–Laban | Meynard Asok | 16,468 | 14.31% |
| Aksyon | Orville Fua | 14,334 | 12.45% |
| PDP–Laban | Harold Dalaygon | 13,370 | 11.62% |
| PFP | Edwin Quimno | 9,375 | 8.14% |
| Aksyon | Jem Masillones | 8,122 | 7.06% |
| Valid ballots | | 26,230 | 75.47% |
| Invalid or blank votes | | 8,527 | 24.53% |
| Total votes | | 34,757 | 100.00% |

== Congressional election ==
- Population (2020): 103,395
- Electorate (2022): 78,458 (162 election returns)
- Turnout (2022): 69,103 (88.08%)

Jake Vincent Villa is the incumbent. He is now running for governor.

Philippine House of Representatives election at Siquijor's Lone district
| Party | Candidate | Votes | % |
|---|---|---|---|
| PDP–Laban | Zaldy Villa | 33,989 | 49.19% |
| Aksyon | Orlando Fua Jr. | 26,722 | 38.67% |
| Independent | Guido Ganhinhin | 1,660 | 2.40% |
| Independent | Joy Lopes de Andrade | 474 | 0.69% |
| PROMDI | Armin Demetillo | 310 | 0.45% |
| Valid ballots | | 63,155 | 91.39% |
| Invalid or blank votes | | 5,948 | 8.61% |
| Total votes | | 69,103 | 100.00% |

== Municipal elections ==
The mayor and vice mayor with the highest number of votes win the seat; they are voted separately, therefore, they may be of different parties when elected. Parties are as stated in their certificates of candidacy.

=== Enrique Villanueva ===
- Electorate (2022): 5,343 (14 Election Returns)
- Turnout (2022): 4,720 (88.34%)

Gerold Pal-ing is the incumbent but term-limited. He ran for councilor instead. Incumbent vice-mayor Leonardo Paculba gunned for mayor but defeated.

Enrique Villanueva Mayoral Election
| Party | Candidate | Votes | % |
|---|---|---|---|
| PROMDI | Nale Vincent Masayon | 2,241 | 47.48% |
| PDP–Laban | Leonardo Paculba | 2,215 | 46.93% |
| PFP | Francis Michael Tong | 44 | 0.93% |
| Valid ballots | | 4,500 | 95.34% |
| Invalid or blank votes | | 220 | 4.66% |
| Total votes | | 4,720 | 100.00% |

Enrique Villanueva Vice Mayoral Election
| Party | Candidate | Votes | % |
|---|---|---|---|
| PDP–Laban | Ruth Aque | 2,331 | 49.39% |
| PROMDI | Jerry Kitong | 2,021 | 42.82% |
| Valid ballots | | 4,352 | 92.20% |
| Invalid or blank votes | | 368 | 7.80% |
| Total votes | | 4,720 | 100.00% |

=== Larena ===
- Electorate (2022): 11,962 (28 election returns)
- Turnout (2022): 10,041 (83.94%)

Dean Villa is the incumbent but now running for governor of the province. Incumbent vice-mayor Cyrus Vincent Calibo is now vying for mayor of the town.

Larena Mayoral Election
| Party | Candidate | Votes | % |
|---|---|---|---|
| Aksyon | Cyrus Vincent Calibo | 5,884 | 58.60% |
| PDP–Laban | Elvis Samson Villa | 3,671 | 36.56% |
| Valid ballots | | 9,555 | 95.16% |
| Invalid or blank votes | | 486 | 4.84% |
| Total votes | | 10,041 | 100.00% |

Larena Vice Mayoral Election
| Party | Candidate | Votes | % |
|---|---|---|---|
| Aksyon | Jan Dean Villa | 4,937 | 49.17% |
| PDP–Laban | Honey Grace Samson | 4,286 | 42.68% |
| Valid ballots | | 9,223 | 91.85% |
| Invalid or blank votes | | 818 | 8.15% |
| Total votes | | 10,041 | 100.00% |

=== Lazi ===
- Electorate (2022): 16,139 (26 election returns)
- Turnout (2022): 14,296 (88.58%)

James Monte and Earl Aljas are the incumbents and reelectionists. Both were defeated.

Lazi Mayoral Election
| Party | Candidate | Votes | % |
|---|---|---|---|
| PDP–Laban | Phil Moore Largo | 6,591 | 46.10% |
| Aksyon | James Monte | 6,029 | 42.17% |
| Independent | Johnney Ensong | 196 | 1.37% |
| Valid ballots | | 12,816 | 89.56% |
| Invalid or blank votes | | 1,480 | 10.3% |
| Total votes | | 14,296 | 100.00% |

Lazi Vice Mayoral Election
| Party | Candidate | Votes | % |
|---|---|---|---|
| PDP–Laban | Rose May Dalaygon | 6,358 | 44.47% |
| Aksyon | Earl Aljas | 5,804 | 40.60% |
| Valid ballots | | 12,162 | 85.07% |
| Invalid or blank votes | | 2,134 | 14.93% |
| Total votes | | 14,296 | 100.00 |

=== Maria ===
- Electorate (2022): 11,128 (24 election returns)
- Turnout (2022): 9,777 (87.86%)

Meynard Asok is the incumbent but term limited. He ran for board member. Incumbent vice-mayor Ivy Dan Samson is a reelectionist and won.

Maria Mayoral Election
| Party | Candidate | Votes | % |
|---|---|---|---|
| PDP–Laban | Roselyn Asok | 4,898 | 50.10% |
| Aksyon | Leo Enot | 4,009 | 41.00% |
| Valid ballots | | 8,907 | 91.10% |
| Invalid or blank votes | | 870 | 8.90% |
| Total votes | | 9,777 | 100.00% |

Maria Vice Mayoral Election
| Party | Candidate | Votes | % |
|---|---|---|---|
| PDP–Laban | Ivy Dan Samson | 4,512 | 46.15% |
| Aksyon | Candelaria Aninipo | 3,753 | 38.39% |
| Valid ballots | | 8,265 | 84.54% |
| Invalid or blank votes | | 1,512 | 15.46% |
| Total votes | | 9,777 | 100.00% |

=== San Juan ===
- Electorate (2022): 12,007 (24 election returns)
- Turnout (2022): 10,684 (88.98%)

Incumbents Wilfredo Capundag Jr. and Gemma Cenas are all vied for mayor of the town. Capundag won.

San Juan Mayoral Election
| Party | Candidate | Votes | % |
|---|---|---|---|
| PFP | Wilfredo Capundag Jr. | 5,170 | 48.39% |
| PDP–Laban | Gemma Cenas | 3,720 | 34.82% |
| Independent | Dioscoro Maata | 1,043 | 9.76% |
| Valid ballots | | 9,933 | 92.97% |
| Invalid or blank votes | | 751 | 7.03% |
| Total votes | | 10,684 | 100.00% |

San Juan Vice Mayoral Election
| Party | Candidate | Votes | % |
|---|---|---|---|
| Independent | Rubilyn Maata Ragay | 5,180 | 48.48% |
| PFP | Lilian Sumalpong | 3,069 | 28.73% |
| PDP–Laban | Freddie Calibo | 1,429 | 13.38% |
| Valid ballots | | 9,678 | 90.58% |
| Invalid or blank votes | | 1,006 | 9.42% |
| Total votes | | 10,684 | 100.00% |

=== Siquijor ===
- Electorate (2022): 21,879 (48 election returns)
- Turnout (2022): 19,585 (89.52%)

Richard Quezon and Teodoro Jumawan Jr. are the incumbents and reelectionist.

Siquijor Mayoral Election
| Party | Candidate | Votes | % |
|---|---|---|---|
| PDP–Laban | Richard Quezon | 10,281 | 52.49% |
| Aksyon | Adam Duhaylungsod | 7,829 | 39.97% |
| Valid ballots | | 18,110 | 92.47% |
| Valid ballots | | 1,475 | 7.53% |
| Total votes | | 19,585 | 100.00% |

Siquijor Vice Mayoral Election
| Party | Candidate | Votes | % |
|---|---|---|---|
| PDP–Laban | Teodoro Jumawan Jr. | 10,788 | 55.08% |
| Aksyon | Delfin Macahis | 6,335 | 32.35% |
| Valid ballots | | 17,123 | 87.43% |
| Invalid or blank votes | | 2,462 | 12.57% |
| Total votes | | 19,585 | 100.00% |
