= List of people from Cagayan de Oro =

The Cagay-anon people (or Kagay-anons) are the multiethnic permanent residents of Cagayan de Oro, a highly urbanized city located in the Northern Mindanao in the Philippines regardless of ethnicity or religion. Locals are themselves often referred to as a "tripeople", composed of indigenous peoples (mainly Higaonons), Moros and descendants of twentieth-century settlers from the Visayas (mostly from Cebu, Bohol, Siquijor and Negros Oriental) and Luzon.

Cebuano is the lingua franca of Cagayan de Oro, used by its inhabitants of diverse ethnic and religious backgrounds to communicate with each other. Other languages spoken varyingly in the city are Higaonon, Binukid, Subanen, Maranao, Iranun, Maguindanaon, Tausug, Bicolano, Hiligaynon, Ilocano, Kapampangan and Pangasinan. English and Tagalog/Filipino are also widely used.

The following is a list of notable people who were either born in, lived in, are current residents of, or are closely associated with the city of Cagayan de Oro.

== Entertainment ==
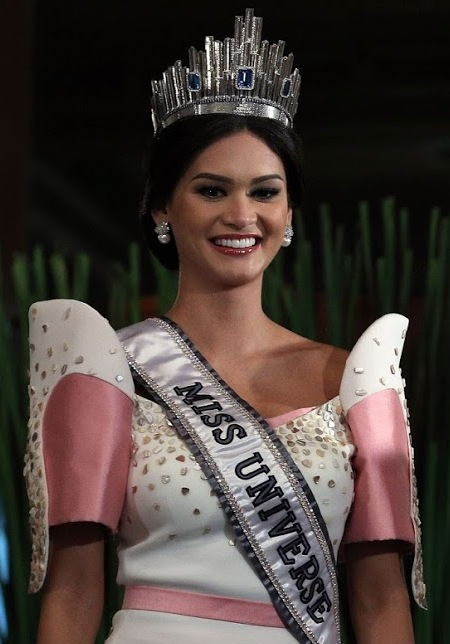
Miss Universe 2015 Pia Wurtzbach

- Arthur Nery – singer, songwriter
- TJ Monterde - singer, songwriter
- Mercy Sunot - singer, member of Aegis
- Felip (musician) - a.k.a. Ken as member of SB19, singer, songwriter, producer
- Maymay Entrata – Pinoy Big Brother: Lucky 7 Big Winner, actress, model
- Charlie Fleming – Pinoy Big Brother: Celebrity Collab Edition 3rd placer, actress, model
- Mark Bautista – singer, songwriter, theater actor
- Sheree Bautista – member of Viva Hot Babes
- Khianna – drag artist from the Drag Race franchise
- Misua — drag artist from the Drag Race franchise
- Maria Isabel Lopez – Binibining Pilipinas Universe 1982, actress
- Nikki de Moura – Miss Grand Philippines 2023
- Maricar Reyes – actress, entrepreneur
- Chanda Romero – actress
- Pia Wurtzbach – Binibining Pilipinas Universe 2015, Miss Universe 2015

== Politics ==
- Rufus Rodriguez – congressman
- Martin Andanar – Secretary of the Presidential Communications Operations Office under President Rodrigo Duterte
- Nicolas Capistrano – lawyer, statesman and revolutionary general who fought against Americans in Cagayan de Misamis (the city's former name) during Philippine-American War, notably the battles of Cagayan de Misamis, Agusan Hill and Macahambus Hill, all in 1900. He entered politics as a 2nd district congressman of then-undivided Misamis Province (1909–1912) and a senator of newly established 11th district shared with Jose Clarin, making him one of the most prominent figures in what is now Cagayan de Oro
- Aquilino "Nene" Pimentel Jr – former Senate President and former city mayor
- Aquilino "Koko" Pimentel III – Senate President under President Rodrigo Duterte, Nene's son
- Atty. Lordan G. Suan – Congressman, Committee on Public Information Chairman and Assistant Majority Leader 20th Congress.Recognized as a top-performing congressman in Northern Mindanao

== Sports ==
- Poy Erram – PBA player (NLEX Road Warriors)
- Jio Jalalon – PBA player (Star Hotshots)
- Carlo Lastimosa – PBA player (NLEX Road Warriors)
- Jojo Lastimosa – retired PBA Player
- Milan Melindo – professional boxer
- Ciso Morales – professional boxer
- Rey Nambatac – PBA player (Rain or Shine)
- Carlo Paalam – Olympic medalist boxer
- Albert Pagara – professional boxer
- Jason Pagara – professional boxer
- Philip Paniamogan – PBA player (NLEX Road Warriors)
- Mariano Vélez – boxer

== Others ==
- Alex Bartolome – rapist and last person to be executed in the Philippines
- Pete Lacaba – poet, writer and journalist
- Emmanuel Lacaba – poet, writer and activist
- Antonio Julian Montalvan – physician, spy, personal surgeon of Col. Wendell Fertig of the 10th Military District during World War 2, executed by the Japanese at Fort Santiago in Manila in 1944 together with José Ozámiz.
- Jose Montalvan – World War II military officer
- Jonaxx – author
- Leo Soriano – former bishop of the United Methodist Church in the Philippines from 2000 to 2012
- Tony Yang (Antonio Lim) – Chinese businessman

== See also ==
- Cagayan de Oro
- Misamis Oriental
