= Montalvan =

Montalvan is a surname of Spanish origin. Notable people with the surname include:

- Antonio Julian Montalván (Born February 8, 1906 - August 30, 1944) was a Filipino member of an espionage team
- Celia Montalván (Born 1899) Mexican actress
- Cristina del Carmen Ferral Montalván (born 16 February 1993) Mexican footballer
- Emilio Álvarez Montalván (1914-2014) Nicaragua ophtalmologist and Foreign Minister
- Jose Montalvan (March 17, 1903 - September 11, 1978) Filipino military, officer, dentist and lawyer
- Luis Carlos Montalvan (April 13, 1973 – December 2, 2016) American writer

== Variants ==
- Montalva
- Montalban
