= Siquijor State College =

Public college in Siquijor, Philippines

- Former names: Larena High School (1920‑1929); Larena Sub‑Provincial High School (1929‑1960); Larena National Vocational School (1960‑1983); Larena National Vocational College (1983‑1995)
- Motto: Strive for Quality Education
- Type: Public State Non-profit Coeducational Higher education institution
- Established: 1920
- Founder: Lt. Gov. Vicente Villanueva
- Academic affiliations: PASUC; AACCUP; PAMI; PPS
- President: Steven J. Sumaylo
- Vice-president: Mary Ann M. Temprosa (VP for Academic Affairs); Michael Vencynth H. Braga (VP for Administration and Finance); Roel D. Taroc (VP for Partnerships, Research, Innovation, Monitoring and Extension); Michael Vencynth H. Braga (Presidential Legal Adviser and Board Secreatary V)
- Dean: List: Renalyn B. Bantawig (Graduate School); Marjorie P. Eslit (College of Arts and Sciences); Jhona Lynn C. Aque (College of Business and Management); Rolito S. Estrellado (College of Technology); Menie J. Dagala (College of Education); Eric Mark E. Opaon (Acting Dean, College of Criminal Justice Education); Gilbert P. Sumalpong (College of Maritime Education); Junbelito B. Altamarino (College of Engineering); Mary Grace B. Lubguban (SHS Principal); Ferilyn B. Maraño (JHS Principal)
- Director: List: Nila T. Caroro (Chief Administrative Officer and Director for Planning and Development); Dawn Iris Calibo-Senit (Director for Research Services); Philna S. Palongpalong (Director for Extension Services); Roel D. Taroc (Director for Maritime Education Programs); Eric Mark E. Opaon (Director for Student Affairs); Renalyn B. Bantawig (Director for Quality Assurance); Ronnmark B. Dimagnaong (Director for Physical Education and Sports, Culture and the Arts); Cyd A. Sarmiento (Director for External Affairs and International Linkages); Rolito S. Estrellado (Director for School Plant, Infrastructure and Facilities); Clifford C. Balolong (Director for Income Generating Projects); Christopher A. Sabado (Director for Networking & ICT Support); Menie J. Dagala (Director for Creatives and Publication); Jay Louie L. Jarbonido (Chief of Staff and Director for Presidential Management Staff); Jull Arcell C. Orlina (Director for Institutional Monitoring and Evaluation); Ruji P. Medina (Director for Strategic Planning, Engagement, Accreditation, and Rankings); Peachy T. Baquilta (Assistant Director for Extension Services and FabLab Manager); Aga S. Hinaut (Director for General Services); Jimmy C. Encabo (Director for Campus Security); Roel D. Taroc (Quality Management Representative); Kyle B. Samson (Document Controller); Jem S. Dandoy (Internal Communication Officer); Jull Arcell C. Orlina (Lead Auditor); Roel D. Taroc (Co-Lead Auditor)
- Students: 3,361 (SY 2021-2022)
- Undergraduates: 3,329
- Postgraduates: 32
- Location: Old Capitol Circle, Brgy. North Poblacion, Larena, Siquijor, Philippines; 9°14′57″N 123°35′21″E
- Campus: 3.9 hectares (9.6 acres)
- Colors: Gray & white
- Website: siquijorstate.edu.ph
- Location in the Visayas Location in the Philippines

Siquijor State College is the only state college in the island province of Siquijor, Negros Island Region, Philippines. The province is situated 30 kilometres (19 mi) east of Negros Island, and 565 kilometres (351 mi) from Manila.

== Campuses ==
The SSC main campus has a total land area of 3.9 hectares (9.6 acres) and is located at Old Capitol Circle in North Poblacion, Larena. It has one satellite campus located in the town of Lazi.

== History ==
Siquijor State College was founded in 1920 by Lt. Governor Vicente Villanueva. It was then called as the Larena High School (LHS) that offered only the first and the second-year levels, one section per curriculum-year level with only two teachers including the principal and was under the supervision of the Negros Oriental Provincial High School (NOPHS) in Dumaguete.

Nine years later (1929), it operated as a complete secondary school and was renamed the Larena Sub-Provincial High School (LSPHS). On 1 July 1960, by virtue of Republic Act No. 2423, the school was converted into a vocational school offering the Secondary Trades Curriculum. This time the school was renamed Larena National Vocational School (LNVS). As the only vocational school in the province, it offered collegiate technical courses and evening opportunity classes.

The National Assembly approved Batasang Pambansa Blg. 387 on 14 April 1983 and LNVS became the Larena National Vocational College (LNVC). Through the joint efforts of Cong. Orlando B. Fua Sr., then representative of the lone district of Siquijor and Cong. Miguel Romero of the 2nd District of Negros Oriental and the constituents of Siquijor, House Bill No. 412 was enacted into law by President Fidel V. Ramos on March 3, 1995, through Republic Act No. 7947. This law converted LNVC to Siquijor State College and authorized the college to offer additional courses in addition to its existing curricular offerings.

Former college presidents:

- Tirso L. Tan Sr. (1995-1999)
- Rosita T. Bidad, Officer-in-Charge (1999-2000)
- Dominador Q. Cabanganan (2000-2008)
- Baldomero R. Martinez Jr. (2008-2013)
- Maria Imogen T. Quilicot (2013-2020)
- Maximo C. Aljibe, CESO III (2021-2022)
