= Montalva (surname) =

Montalva is a surname of Spanish origin. Notable people with the surname include:

- Eduardo Frei Montalva (16 January 1911 – 22 January 1982), President of Chile
- José Manuel Montalva, Chilean politician who served as a minister
- José Montalva (born 28 May 1985), Chilean politician
- Ramón Cañas Montalva (26 February 1896 – 12 August 1977) Chilean Army general
