= Larena =

Municipality in Siquijor, Philippines

Larena Canoan
- Municipality
- Municipality of Larena
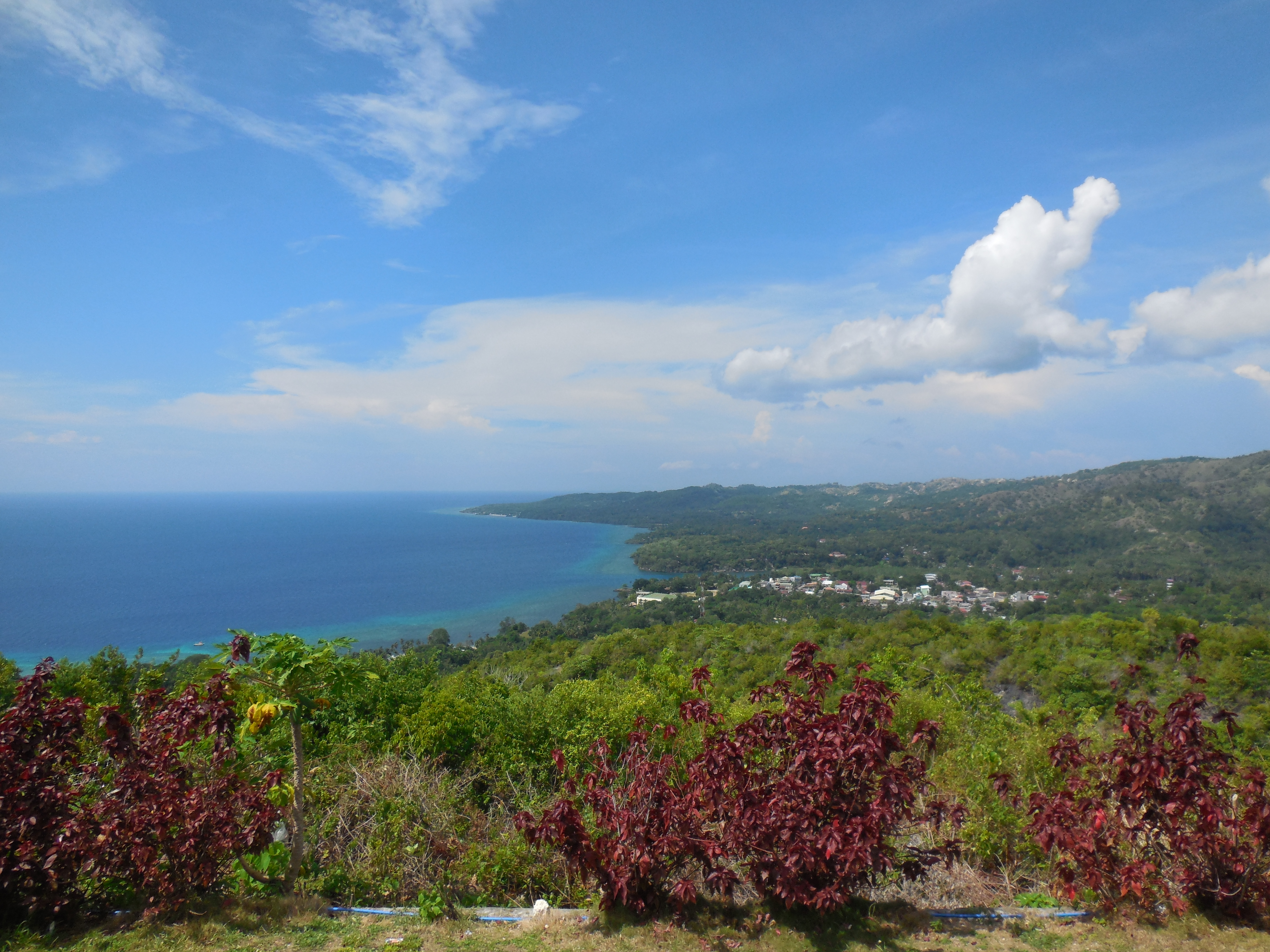
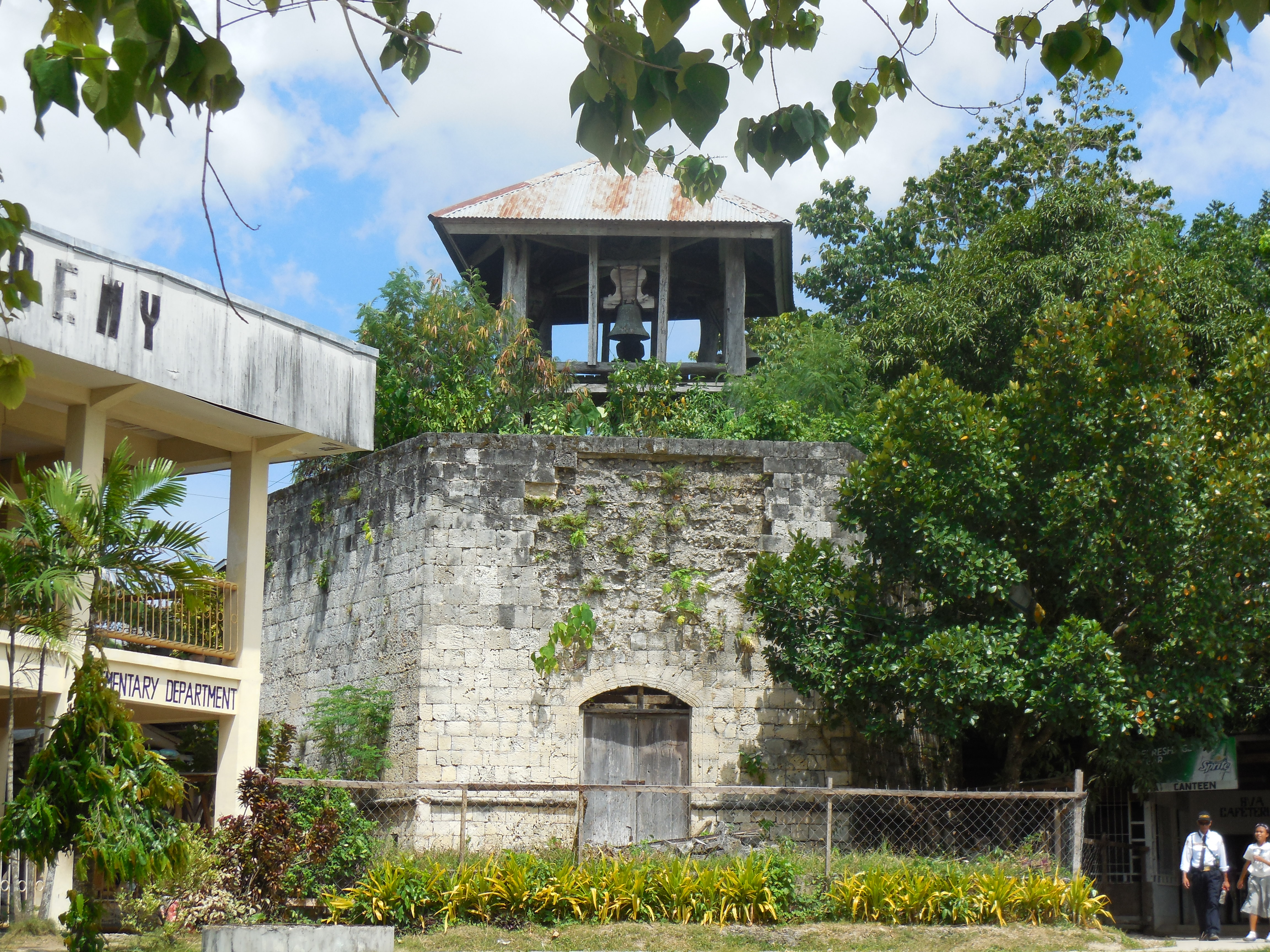
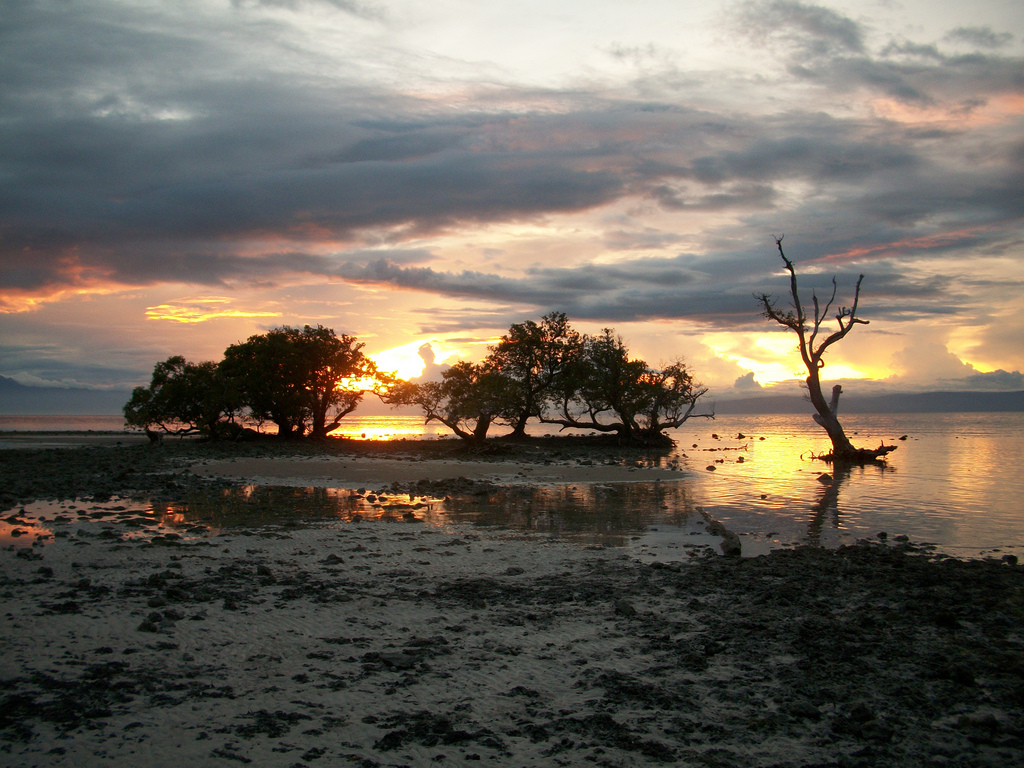
- View of the town proper and Larena Bay from Triad Hill St. Vincent Ferrer Church belfry Sandugan Beach sunset

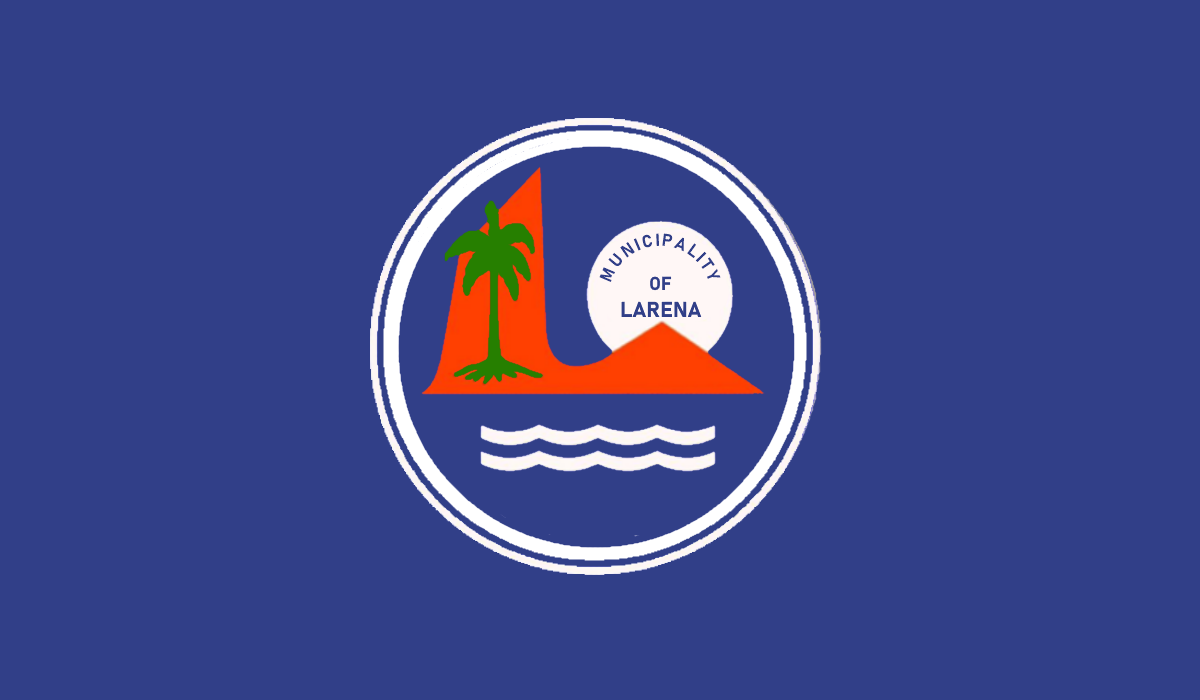
- Flag Seal

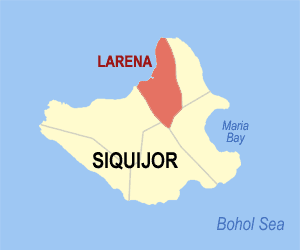
- Map of Siquijor with Larena highlighted
- Interactive map of Larena
- Location within the Philippines
- Coordinates: 9°14′56″N 123°35′28″E
- Country: Philippines
- Region: Negros Island Region
- Province: Siquijor
- District: Lone district
- Named for: Demetrio Larena
- Barangays: 23 (see Barangays)

Government
  - Type: Sangguniang Bayan
  - Mayor: Cyrus Vincent M. Calibo
  - Vice Mayor: Jan Dean O. Villa (Aksyon)
  - Representative: Zaldy Villa (Lakas)
  - Municipal Council: Members: Jose Moses V. Palmitos; Rockshell F. Camero; Honey Grace M. Samson; Haidee T. Lucero; Charles M. Padayhag; Dindo P. Larot; Cris Y. De la Cruz; Norvel S. Manosa
  - Electorate: 11,960 voters (2025)

Area
  - Total: 49.81 km^{2} (19.23 sq mi)
- Elevation: 104 m (341 ft)
- Highest elevation: 448 m (1,470 ft)
- Lowest elevation: 0 m (0 ft)

Population (2024 census)
  - Total: 14,933
  - Density: 299.8/km^{2} (776.5/sq mi)
  - Households: 3,365

Economy
  - Income class: 4th municipal income class
  - Poverty incidence: 4.42% (2023)
  - Revenue: ₱ 122.4 million (2024)
  - Assets: ₱ 375.5 million (2024)
  - Expenditure: ₱ 44.93 million (2024)
  - Liabilities: ₱ 57.29 million (2024)

Service provider
  - Electricity: Province of Siquijor Electric Cooperative (PROSIELCO)
- Time zone: UTC+8 (PST)
- ZIP code: 6226
- PSGC: 076102000
- IDD : area code: +63 (0)35
- Native languages: Cebuano; Tagalog
- Patron saint: Saint Vincent Ferrer
- Website: larena.gov.ph

Larena, officially the Municipality of Larena (Cebuano: Lungsod sa Larena; Tagalog: Bayan ng Larena), is a municipality in the province of Siquijor, Philippines. According to the 2024 census, it has a population of 14,933 people.

Larena is the former capital of the province of Siquijor. It is 10 kilometres (6.2 mi) from the current provincial capital Siquijor.

== History ==
Canoan, the name for Larena during the Spanish period, had long been a thriving township. Its prominence led the Spanish authorities to develop it into a capital town or cabecera for the whole island of Siquijor.

=== American Period ===
At the turn of the century, under the American rule, Canoan continued to serve as a cabecera, with lieutenant governor James Fugate, the first American governor of Siquijor, holding office for sixteen years ending in 1916. That same year, the authorities in Manila, acting on the recommendation of local authorities officially declared Canoan as a capital town. During his term which began in 1901, Governor Demetrio Larena, the first Filipino governor for Negros Oriental and Siquijor, changed the name of Canoan to Larena, his own name, which was duly approved by the Philippine legislature.

From then on until the declaration of martial law in 1972, several people shared the mayoral seat after every four years. Albito was followed by Restituto Calibo. Then Antonio Albito again. In the following election, he was replaced by Herbert Calibo, who in turn was followed by Soledado Lumosad. Juanito Calibo followed and stayed for most of the martial law era and again succeeded by Herbert Calibo.

The post-EDSA Revolution Dr. Remedios Albito served as mayor followed by Gold L. Calibo then Dean S. Villa.

All through the years, spanning the time before and after the war, Larena maintained its position as the hub of business activities in the province. The small but safe port of Larena is a strategic port of call for merchant ships from major cities in Central Visayas and Northern Mindanao. It is home to two commercial banks and a rural bank. Nationally known commercial establishments usually set their shops here.

== Geography ==
=== Barangays ===
Larena is politically subdivided into 23 barangays. Each barangay consists of puroks and some have sitios.

PSGC	Barangay	Population			±% p.a.	
		2024		2010		
076102001	Bagacay	4.0%	593	631	▾	−0.43%
076102002	Balolang	2.3%	343	313	▴	0.63%
076102003	Basac	6.8%	1,022	1,051	▾	−0.19%
076102004	Bintangan	2.3%	350	217	▴	3.35%
076102005	Bontod	3.8%	571	532	▴	0.49%
076102006	Cabulihan	2.1%	318	251	▴	1.64%
076102007	Calunasan	2.7%	401	381	▴	0.35%
076102008	Candigum	2.9%	426	353	▴	1.30%
076102009	Cang‑allas	2.6%	386	294	▴	1.89%
076102010	Cang‑apa	3.0%	454	332	▴	2.18%
076102011	Cangbagsa	7.0%	1,039	881	▴	1.14%
076102012	Cangmalalag	3.1%	465	376	▴	1.47%
076102013	Canlambo	5.2%	779	758	▴	0.19%
076102014	Canlasog	2.2%	329	274	▴	1.27%
076102015	Catamboan	3.6%	545	392	▴	2.29%
076102016	Helen (Datag)	9.0%	1,348	1,262	▴	0.45%
076102017	Nonoc	7.9%	1,176	1,027	▴	0.94%
076102018	North Poblacion	5.8%	861	1,019	▾	−1.15%
076102020	Ponong	2.0%	302	266	▴	0.88%
076102021	Sabang (Note: With boundary dispute with barangay Sabang, Siquijor.)	3.0%	451	84	▴	12.27%
076102022	Sandugan	7.2%	1,077	1,021	▴	0.37%
076102019	South Poblacion	5.5%	827	789	▴	0.32%
076102023	Taculing	2.6%	391	425	▾	−0.57%
	Total		14,933	12,931	▴	1.00%

=== Climate ===
Climate data for Larena, Siquijor
Month	Jan	Feb	Mar	Apr	May	Jun	Jul	Aug	Sep	Oct	Nov	Dec	Year
Mean daily maximum °C (°F)	29 (84)	30 (86)	31 (88)	32 (90)	31 (88)	30 (86)	30 (86)	30 (86)	30 (86)	29 (84)	29 (84)	29 (84)	30 (86)
Mean daily minimum °C (°F)	22 (72)	22 (72)	22 (72)	23 (73)	24 (75)	24 (75)	24 (75)	24 (75)	24 (75)	24 (75)	23 (73)	23 (73)	23 (74)
Average precipitation mm (inches)	26 (1.0)	22 (0.9)	28 (1.1)	41 (1.6)	95 (3.7)	136 (5.4)	147 (5.8)	126 (5.0)	132 (5.2)	150 (5.9)	98 (3.9)	46 (1.8)	1,047 (41.3)
Average rainy days	7.5	6.7	8.9	10.4	21.6	25.6	26.3	25.0	24.1	26.2	19.2	12.1	213.6
Source: Meteoblue (modeled/calculated data, not measured locally)

== Demographics ==
Population census of Larena

Year	Pop.	±% p.a.
1903	10,450	—
1918	11,884	+0.86%
1939	7,544	−2.14%
1948	7,041	−0.76%
1960	7,790	+0.85%
1970	9,344	+1.83%

Year	Pop.	±% p.a.
1975	9,794	+0.95%
1980	10,365	+1.14%
1990	11,010	+0.61%
1995	11,212	+0.34%
2000	11,861	+1.21%
2007	12,550	+0.78%

Year	Pop.	±% p.a.
2010	12,931	+1.09%
2015	13,847	+1.31%
2020	14,454	+0.91%
2024	14,933	+0.79%

Source: Philippine Statistics Authority

== Economy ==
Poverty incidence of Larena (%)

Source: Philippine Statistics Authority

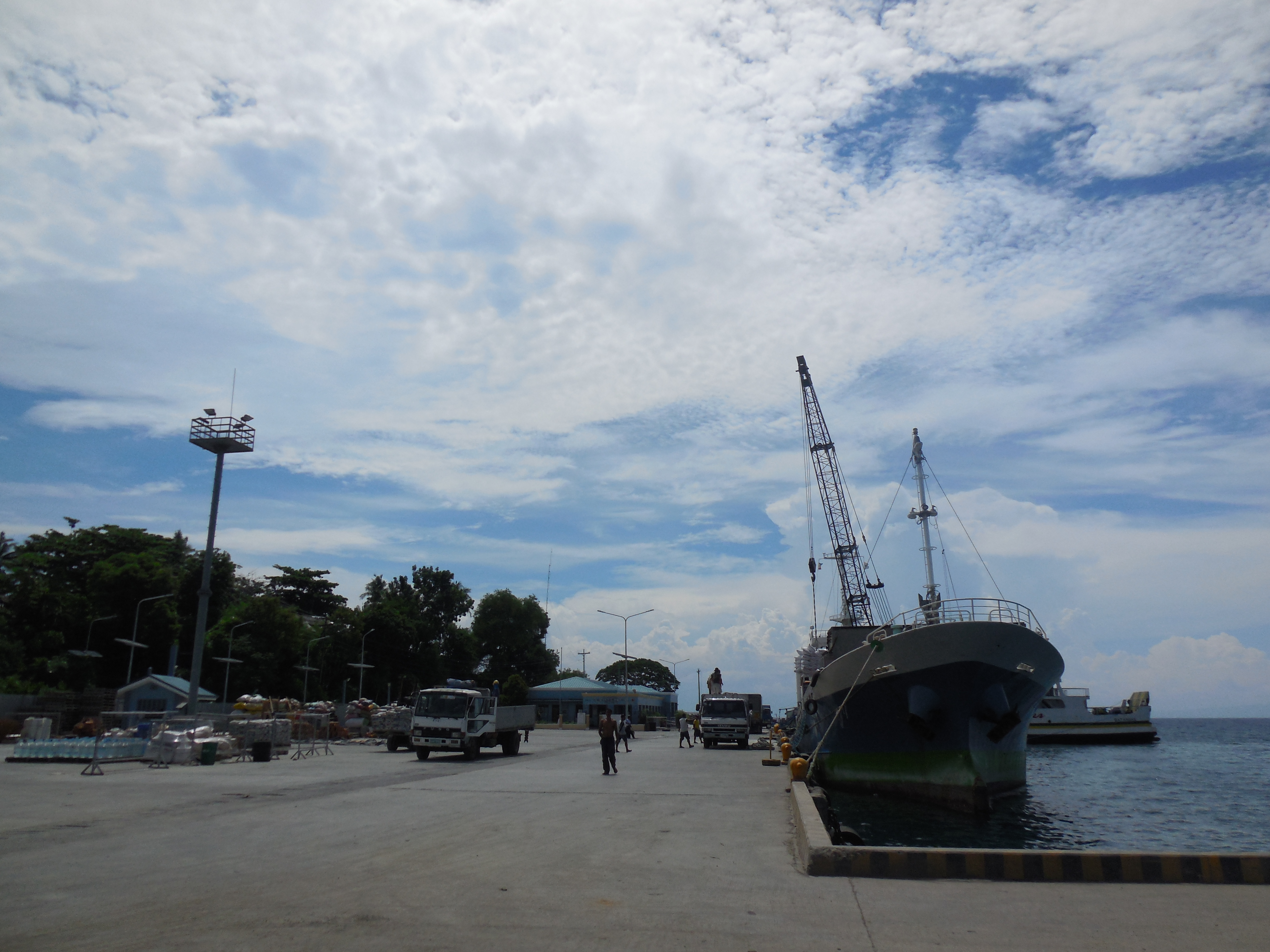
Larena Port

== Transportation ==
The Port of Larena is the main gateway to Siquijor Island as it is the largest port. It can accommodate ships up to 1,000 tons. Lite Ferries provides service from Larena to Tagbilaran in Bohol, Cebu City, and Plaridel in Misamis Occidental. Maayo Shipping provides service from Larena to Liloan in Santander, Cebu and Bato in Samboan, Cebu.

== Education ==
An established educational institution in Larena underwent several structural changes. Initially founded as the Larena Sub-Provincial High School, the institution became the Larena National Vocational School and was later renamed the Larena National Vocational College, attracting students across the province and surrounding regions.

On 3 March 1995, LNVC was converted into a state college now known as Siquijor State College (SSC). In 2006, a second campus was named SSC-Lazi campus in the town of Lazi.

The public schools in the town of Larena are administered by one school district under the Schools Division of Siquijor.

Elementary schools:

- Basac Elementary School — Basac
- Candigum Elementary School — Candigum
- New Bataan Elementary School — Cang-apa
- New Corregidor Elementary School — Calunasan
- Nonoc Elementary School — Nonoc
- Ponong Elementary School — Ponong

High schools:

- Basac National High School — Basac

Integrated schools:

- Cabulihan Integrated School — Cangmalalag
- Larena Integrated School (formerly Larena CES) — Helen

== Gallery ==
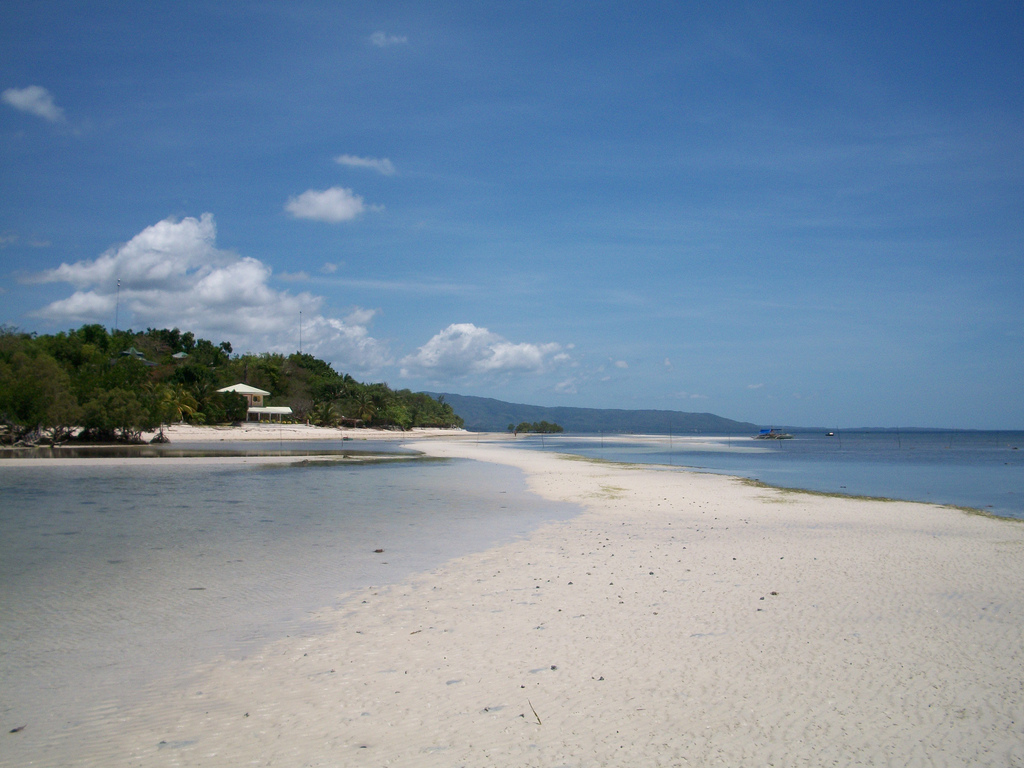
Sandugan Beach in Larena, Siquijor

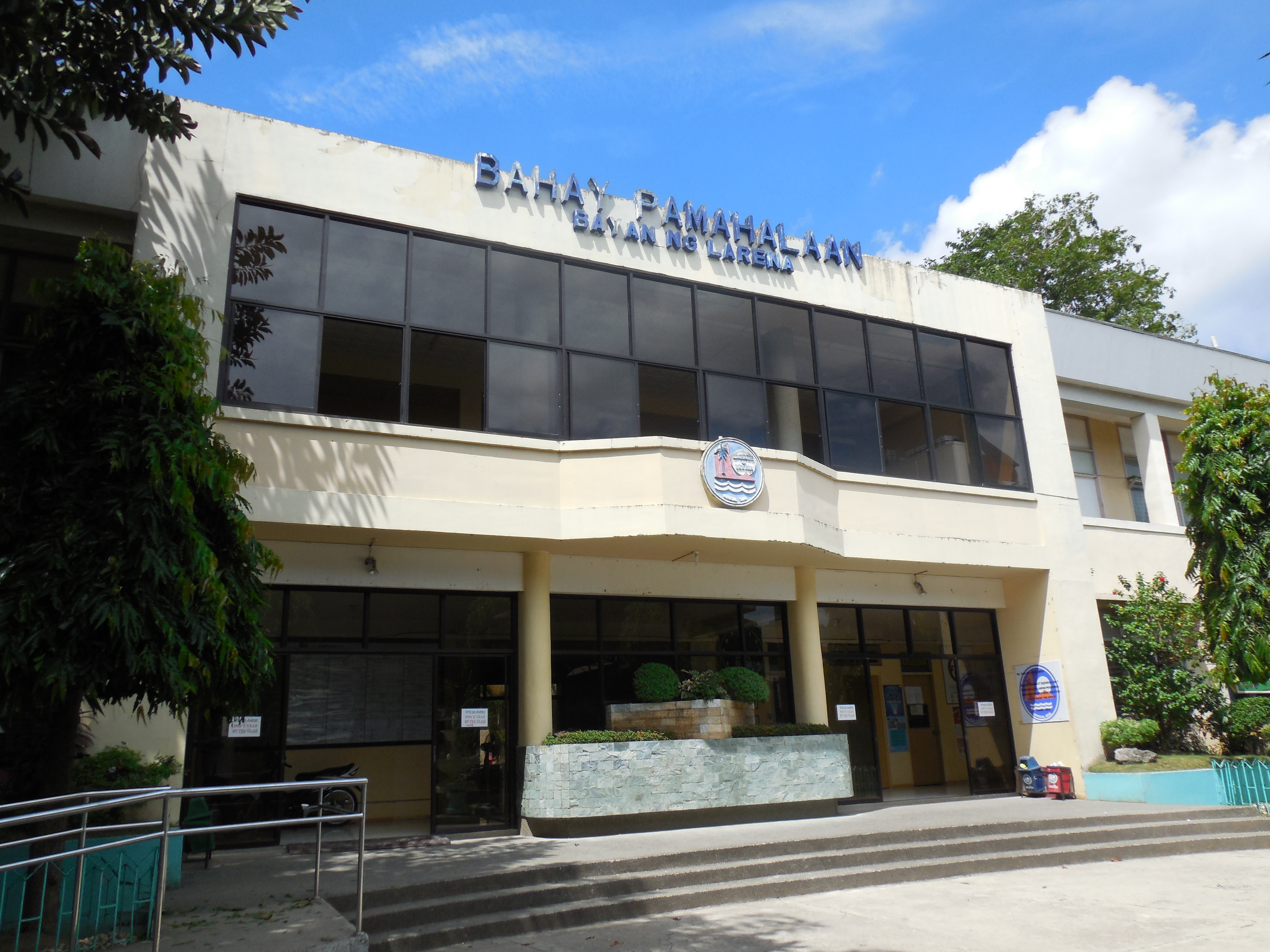
Town Hall

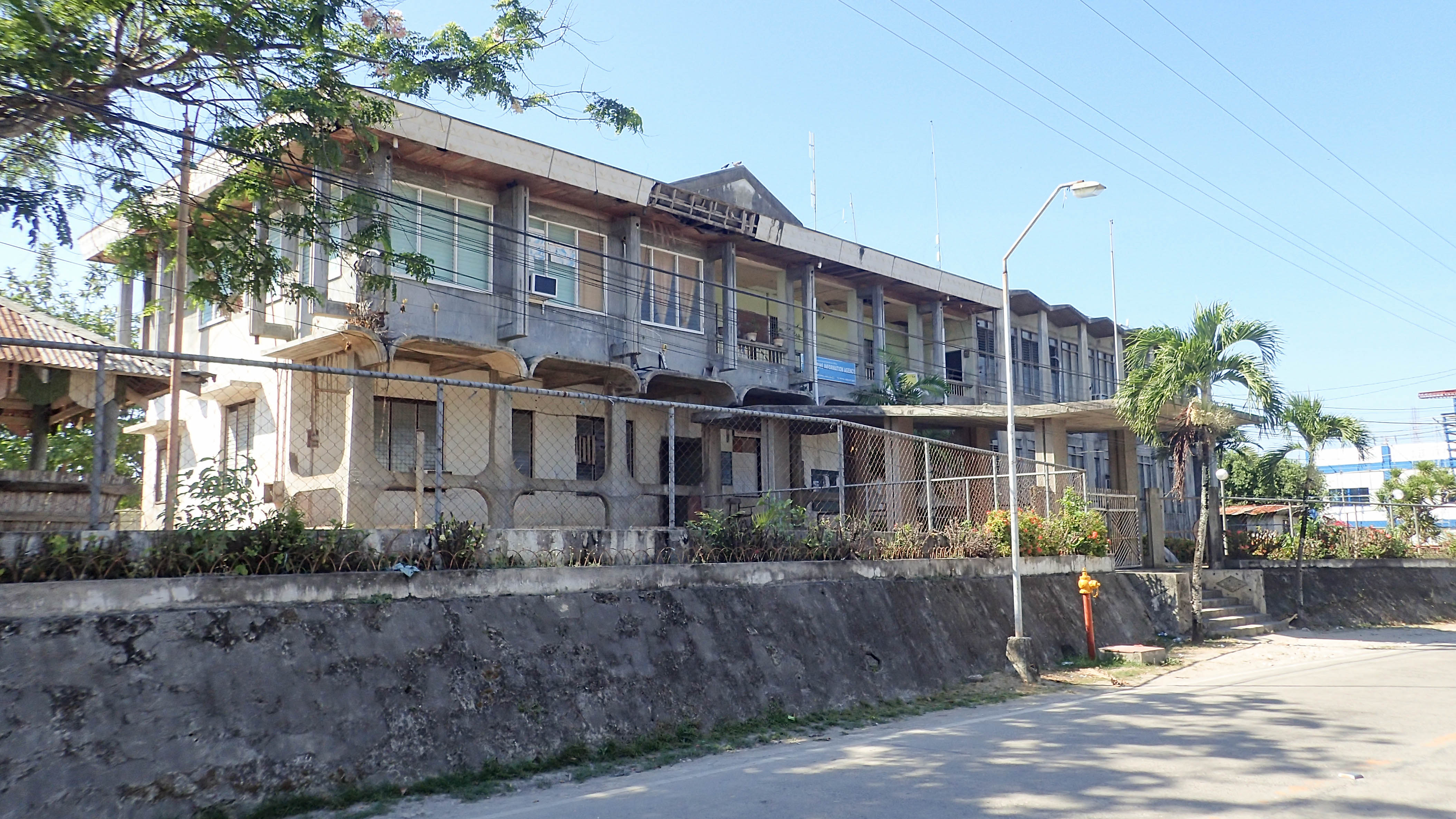
Old Provincial Capitol of Siquijor

St. Vincent Ferrer Parish Church

Larena Tourism Office
