= Antonio Julian Montalván =

- Born: February 8, 1906; Cagayan de Misamis, Philippine Islands, United States
- Died: August 30, 1944 (aged 38); Manila, Philippines
- Resting place: Cementerio del Norte
- Education: University of Santo Tomas
- Occupation: Medical doctor
- Spouse: Rosario Llamas

Antonio Julian Montalván (February 8, 1906 – August 30, 1944) was a Filipino member of an espionage team working for the return of General Douglas MacArthur to the Philippines.

The group helped establish coastal radio relay stations in Mindanao, Visayas and Southern Luzon. Later, he became part of a Manila spy network. Then newly married to Rosario Llamas, a cousin of Virginia Llamas Romulo—the first Mrs. Carlos P. Romulo—he was arrested by the Japanese Kempeitai in Tayabas town, in the house of his mother in-law Doña Tecla Capistrano Llamas. He was about to pack his bags for another clandestine boat trip to Mindanao. The Japanese later detained and tortured him in Fort Santiago and at the Old Bilibid Prisons in Manila.

On August 30, 1944, he was executed by decapitation with the group of his cousin and brother in-law Senator José Ozámiz and the Elizalde group of Manila which included the writer Rafael Roces and Blanche Walker Jurika, the mother in-law of guerilla leader Charles "Chick" Parsons.

Philippine historian Ambeth Ocampo describes Montalbán as a "World War II hero of Mindanao". A street in Cagayan de Oro is named for him.
