= Siquijor =

- Province
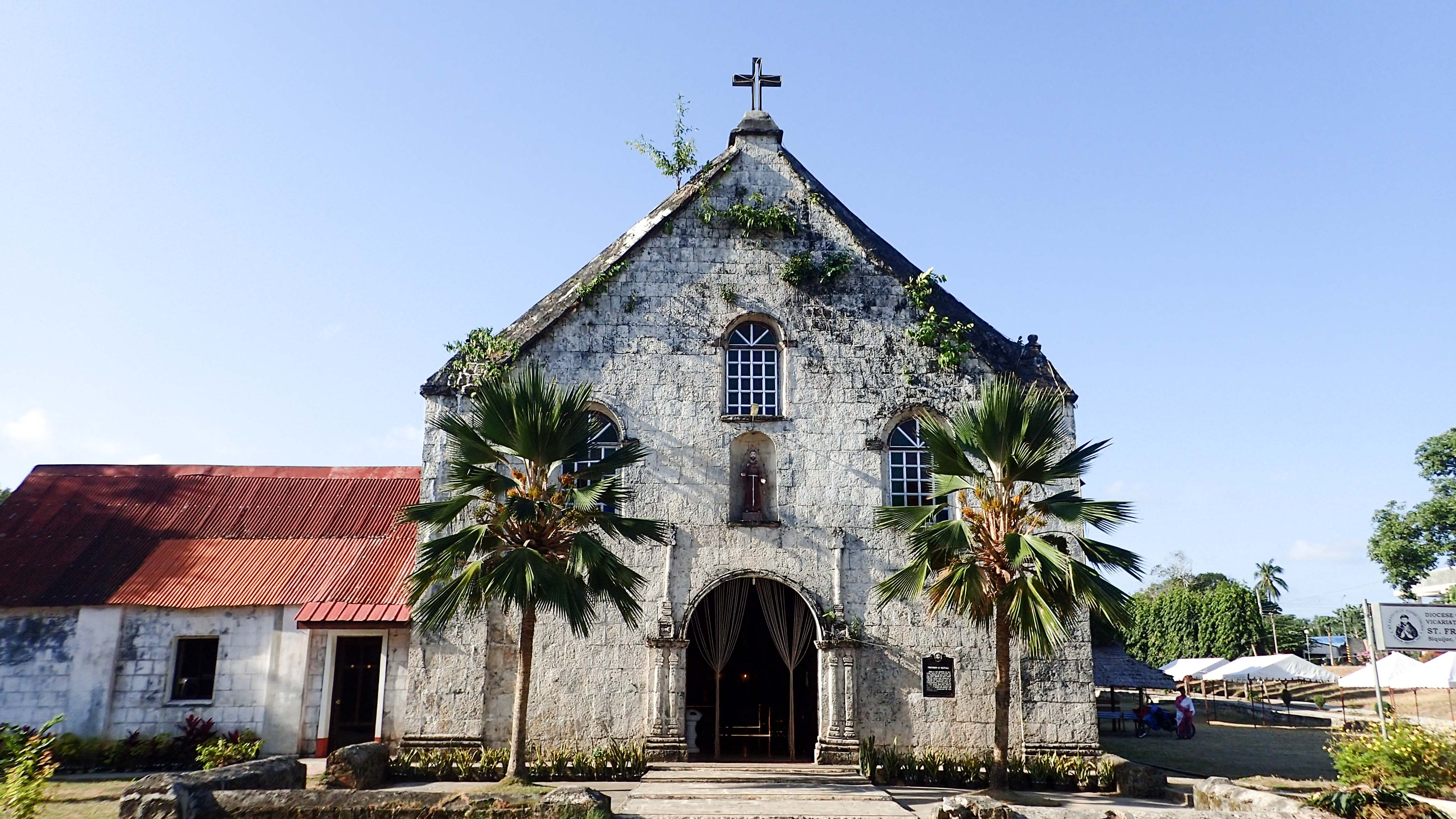
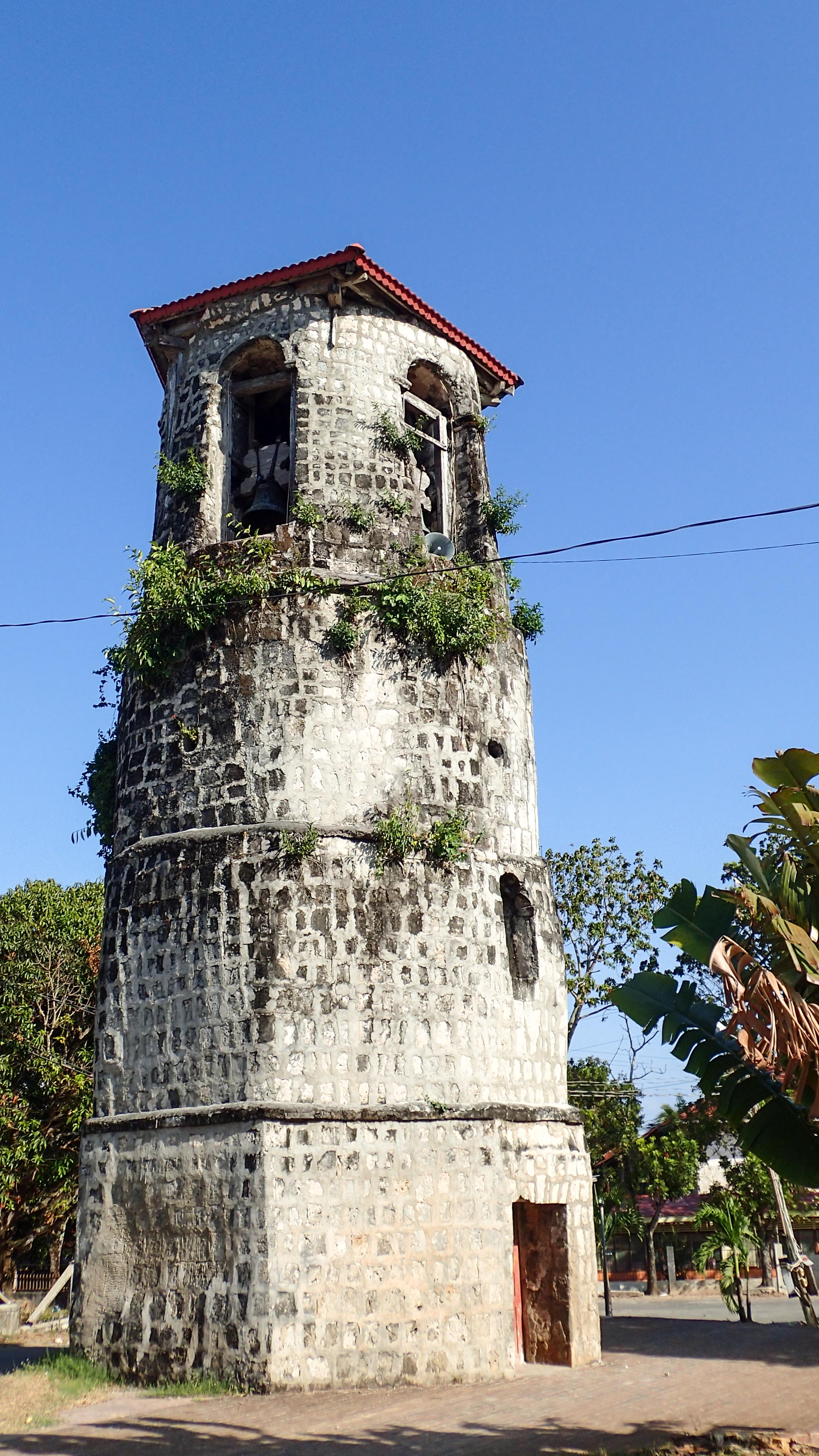
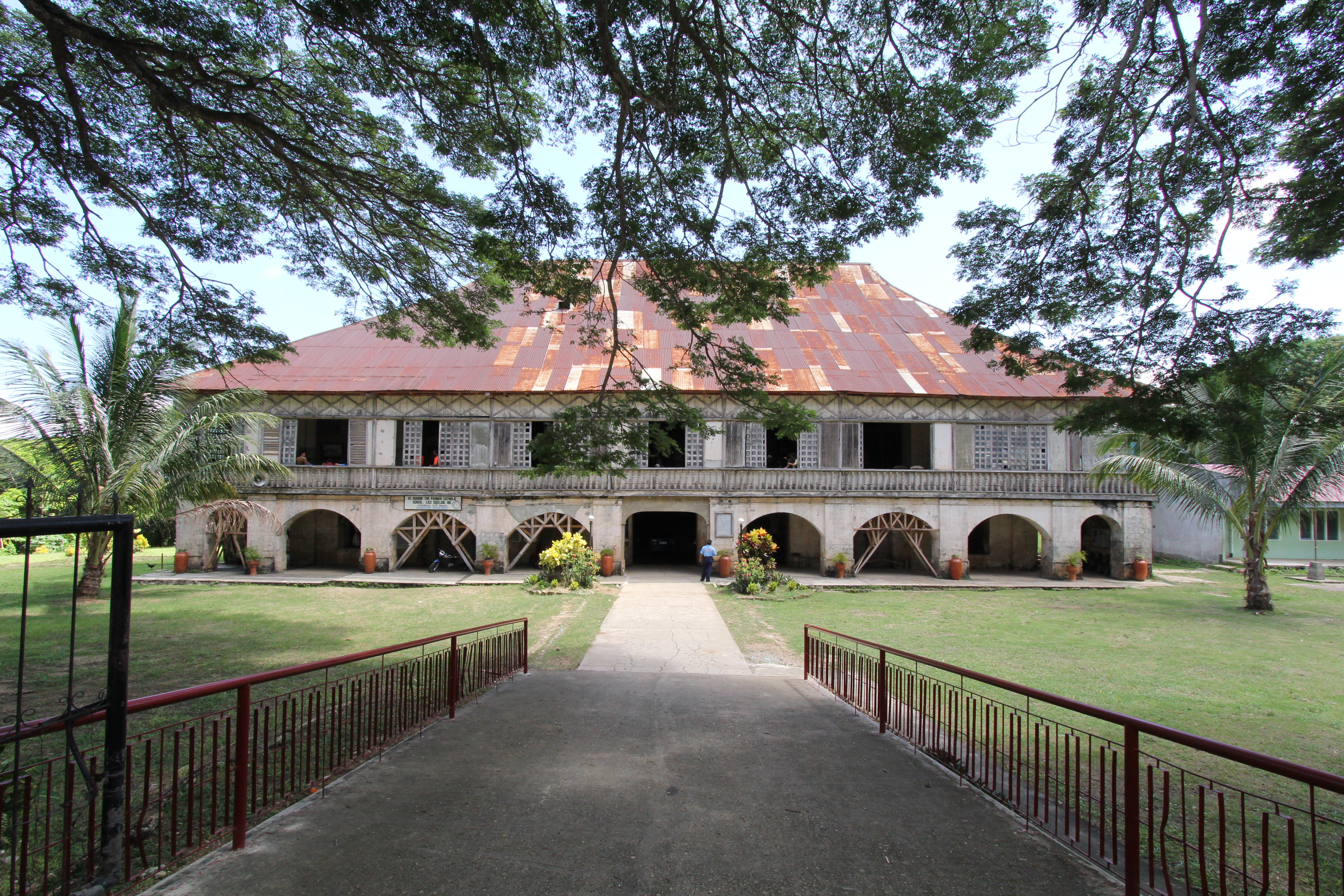
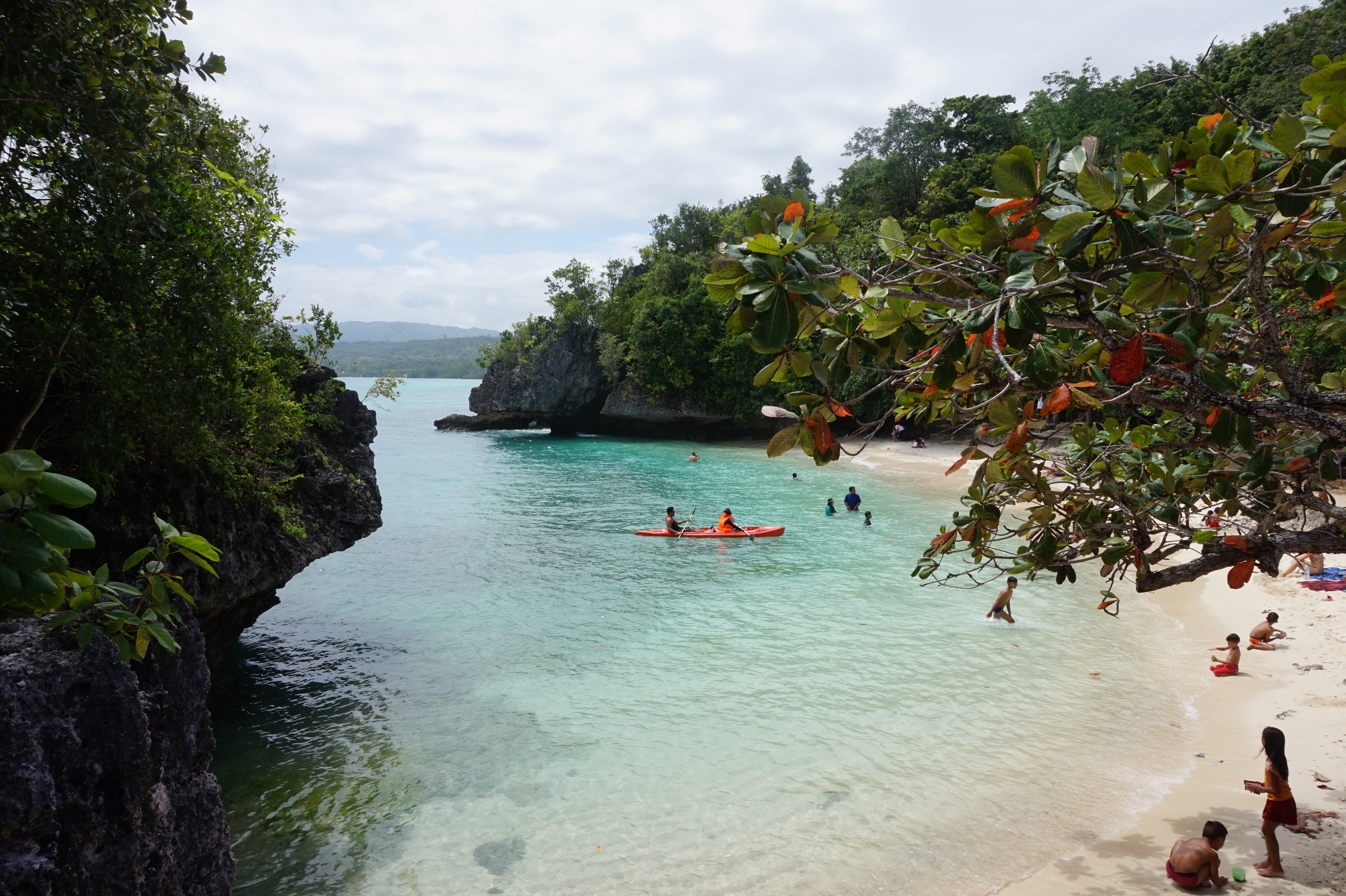
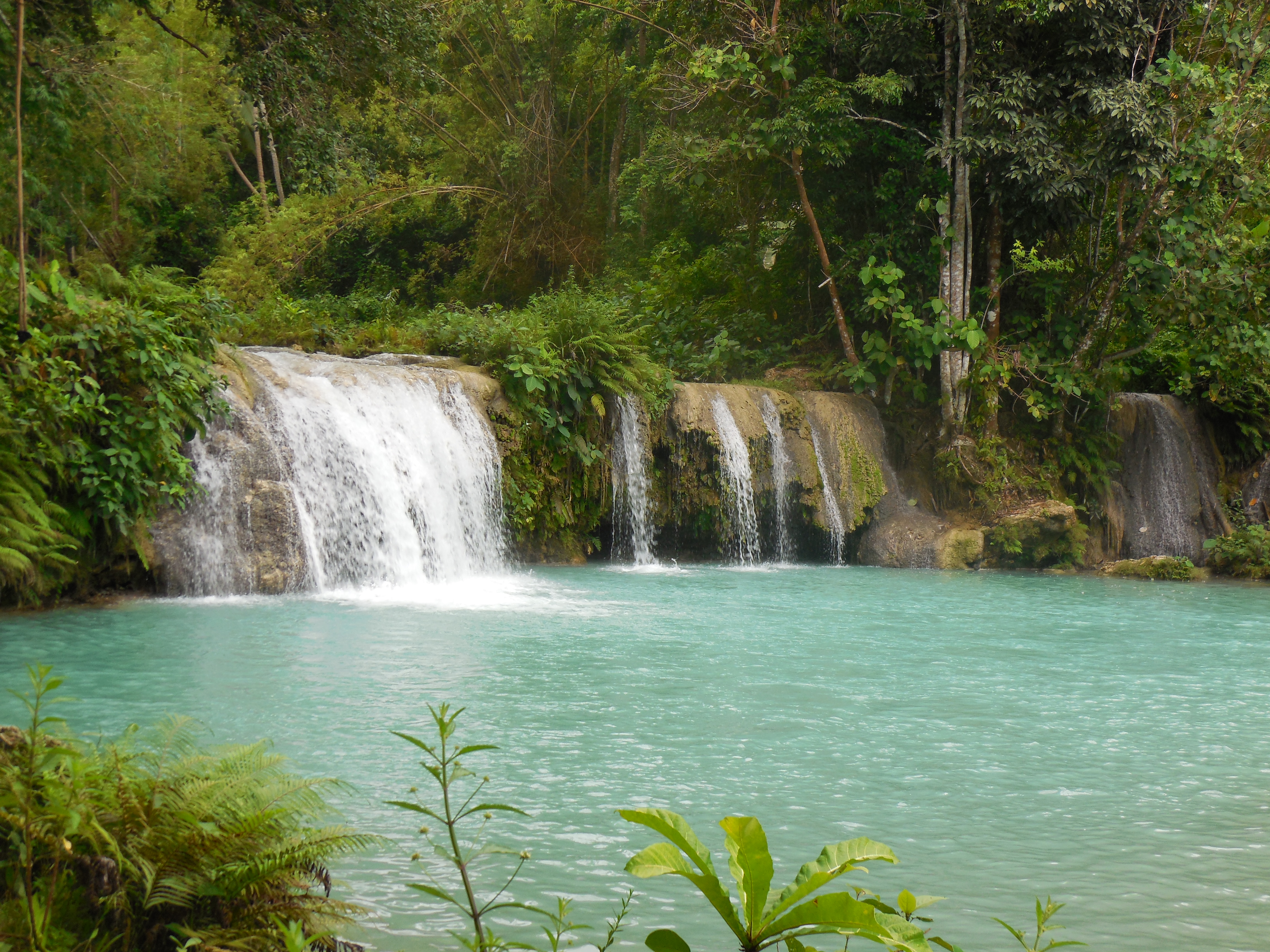
- Clockwise from the top: Saint Francis of Assisi Church, Lazi Church Convent, Cambugahay Falls, Salagdoong Beach, Saint Francis of Assisi Church Belfry

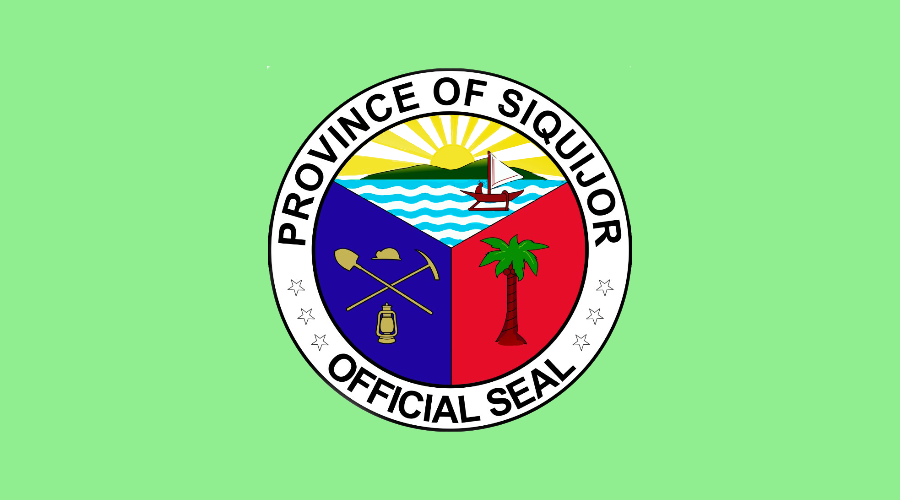
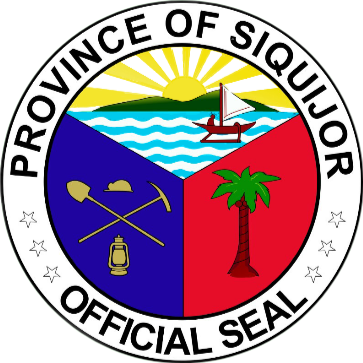
- Flag Seal

- Location in the Philippines
- Interactive map of Siquijor
- Coordinates: 9°11′N 123°35′E
- Country: Philippines
- Region: Negros Island Region
- Founded: 17 September 1971
- Capital and largest municipality: Siquijor

Government
  - Type: Sangguniang Panlalawigan
  - Governor: Jake Vincent S. Villa (PFP)
  - Vice Governor: Dindo A. Tumala (PFP)
  - Representative: Zaldy Villa (PFP)
  - Legislature: Siquijor Provincial Board
  - Electorate: 81,404 voters (2025)

Area
  - Total: 337.49 km^{2} (130.31 sq mi)
  - Rank: 79th out of 82
- Highest elevation (Mount Bandila-an): 628 m (2,060 ft)

Population (2024 census)
  - Total: 107,642
  - Rank: 79th out of 82
  - Density: 318.95/km^{2} (826.07/sq mi)
  - Rank: 29th out of 82
  - Households: 25,805
- Demonym: Siquijodnon

Divisions
  - Component cities: 0
  - Municipalities: 6: Enrique Villanueva; Larena; Lazi; Maria; San Juan; Siquijor
  - Barangays: 134
  - Districts: Legislative district of Siquijor

Economy
  - Income class: 3rd provincial income class
  - Poverty incidence: 3.5% (2023)
  - Revenue: ₱ 924.1 million (2024)
  - Assets: ₱ 5,594 million (2024)
  - Expenditure: ₱ 481.6 million (2024)
  - Liabilities: ₱ 1,428 million (2024)
- Time zone: UTC+08:00 (PST)
- PSGC: 076100000
- IDD : area code: +63 (0)35
- ISO 3166 code: PH-SIG
- Spoken languages: Cebuano; Tagalog; English
- Website: siquijorprovince.com

Siquijor (/ˌsɪkiˈhɔːr/ SIK-ee-HOR, Tagalog: [sɪkɪˈhɔɾ]), officially the Province of Siquijor (Cebuano: Lalawigan sa Siquijor; Tagalog: Lalawigan ng Siquijor), is a Philippine island province (the third smallest in the country, in terms of population and land area) located within the Negros Island Region. Its largest town and capital is the municipality of Siquijor. The province lies south of Cebu, southeast of Negros Oriental, southwest of Bohol, and north of Mindanao.

During the Spanish colonial period of the Philippines, the Spaniards called Siquijor the Isla del Fuego (Island of Fire), due to the glow of fireflies that swarmed the molave trees.

== Etymology ==
One popular legend says the name "Siquijor" comes from the famed pre-Spanish ruler of the island, King Datu Kihod. Upon the Spaniards' arrival, Kihod introduced himself by saying "si kihod", or "I am Kihod", something which, presumably, the Spanish believed to be in reference to the physical island, thus they named it "Sikihod". Over time, the name eventually morphed into Siquijor.

Another legend says that a priest who visited the island said to the people, in Bohol, "sequor," meaning "to follow the waves"; the people misheard this, and assumed the island's name to be Siquijor.

Siquijor may have also come from the native word quidjod, meaning "the tide is going out".

== History ==
=== Early history ===
According to legend, Siquijor was formed from the sea by a storm and an earthquake in the Visayan region. In modern times, highland farmers have found giant seashells underneath their farm plots to support this legend.

Prior to colonization, Siquijor was once called Katugasan, named after the tugas, the molave trees which abounded the island. The native dwellers of the island used these trees to build posts (haligi) for their houses because of their strength and durability that could withstand strong typhoons and monsoons. Most of the patriarchs of the island used the tugas to make a wooden plow (tukod) to cultivate the rocky soil for farming using mainly male cattle (toro) to pull it through the sticky and hard rocky soil. However, before the discovery of using tugas as the foundations of their houses, the island natives dwelt in caves as shown by the pottery and old tools like stone grinder excavated from the three caves of Sam-ang.

During this time, the people were already in contact with Chinese traders, as seen through archaeological evidence including Chinese ceramics and other objects. The art of traditional healing and traditional witchcraft belief systems also developed within this period. During the arrival of the Spanish, the monarch of the island was Datu Kihod, as recorded in Legazpi's chronicles.

=== Spanish occupation ===
The island was first sighted by the Spaniards in 1565 during Miguel López de Legazpi's expedition. The Spaniards called the island Isla del Fuego ("Island of Fire"), because the island gave off an eerie glow, from the great swarms of fireflies that lived in the numerous molave trees on the island. Esteban Rodríguez of the Legazpi expedition led the first Spaniards to discover the island. He was captain of a small party that left Legazpi's camp in Bohol to explore the nearby islands which are now called Pamilacan, Siquijor, and Negros.

The island, along with the rest of the archipelago, was subsequently annexed to the Spanish Empire. Founded in 1783 under the administration of secular clergymen, Siquijor became the first municipality as well as the first parish to be established on the island. Siquijor was, from the beginning, administered by the Diocese of Cebu. As for civil administration, Siquijor was under Bohol since the province had its own governor. The first Augustinian Recollect priest arrived in Siquijor in 1794. The 1818 census yielded the counting of 2,450 native families and 16 Spanish-Filipino families. Several years later, a priest of the same order founded the parishes of Larena (initially called Can‑oan), Lazi (formerly Tigbawan), San Juan (Makalipay), and Maria (Cang‑meniao). With the exception of Enrique Villanueva, the other five municipalities were established as parishes in 1877. From 1854 to 1892, Siquijor was administered by the politico-military province of Bohol. Later in 1892, it was transferred to Negros Oriental and became its sub-province in 1901.

=== American occupation ===
At the turn of the century, Spain ceded the Philippines to the United States of America with the Treaty of Paris that ended the Spanish–American War. Siquijor Island felt the presence of American rule when a unit of the American Cavalry Division came and stayed for some time. The American Military Governor in Manila appointed James Fugate, a scout with the California Volunteers of the U.S. Infantry, to oversee and implement the organization and development programs in Siquijor Island. Governor Fugate stayed for 16 years as lieutenant governor of Siquijor. (Note: After Siquijor, Fugate became governor of Sulu province, where he was murdered in 1938.)

=== Japanese occupation ===
While it was not at the center of military action, Siquijor was not spared by World War II. Imperial Japanese detachments occupied the island between 1942 and 1943, announcing their arrival on the island with heavy shelling. At the outbreak of the war, Siquijor was a sub-province of Negros Oriental, headed by Lieutenant Governor Nicolas Parami. Refusing to pledge allegiance to the Japanese forces, Parami was taken by Japanese soldiers from his residence at Poo, Lazi one evening and brought to the military headquarters in Larena. He was never heard from again. On November 10, 1942, Japanese warships started shelling Lazi from Cang‑abas Point. In Lazi, a garrison was established in the old Home Economics Building of the Central School. Filipino guerrillas engaged in sabotage and the interaction during this time caused havoc on the Japanese lives and properties.

During this period, Siquijor was briefly governed by Shunzo Suzuki, a Japanese civilian appointed by the Japanese forces until he was assassinated in October 1942 by the guerrilla forces led by Iluminado Jumawanin, of Caipilan, Siquijor. Mamor Fukuda took control of Siquijor from June 1943 until the Japanese forces abandoned the island when the liberation forces came in 1944. In 1943, the Japanese puppet government appointed Sebastian Monera of San Juan as Governor of Siquijor. His administration, however, was cut short when he was executed, presumably by Filipino guerrillas operating in the mountains of Siquijor.

On September 30, 1943, the United States submarine USS Bowfin (SS-287) delivered supplies to the people of Siquijor and evacuated people from the island. On February 21, 1945, the destroyer USS Renshaw (DD-499) was escorting a convoy of about 50 landing ships with 12 other escorts, when it was attacked by a Japanese midget submarine off the coast of Siquijor, which caused extensive damage to the ship and killed 19 of the crew.

In mid-1945, local Filipino soldiers and officers under the 7th, 75th, and 76th Infantry Division of the Philippine Commonwealth Army arrived, and alongside recognized guerrilla fighter groups, liberated Siquijor.

=== Philippine independence ===
St. Isidore the Laborer Church

After the war, Siquijor spent most of the time of the Third Philippine Republic as a subprovince of Negros Oriental.

Siquijor became an independent province on September 17, 1971, under Republic Act 6398. The move was supported by the people of Siquijor as they have a distinct culture from those of Negros Oriental, while Marcos used the movement as a means to secure support from the people of the island to pave martial law acceptance the following year. The capital, formerly Larena, was transferred to the municipality of Siquijor in 1972 by Proclamation No. 1075, under martial law.

=== Contemporary ===
In 2006, the Lazi Church was added by the government as an extension to the Baroque Churches of the Philippines UNESCO World Heritage Site. The inscription of the church has been pending since.

In 2024, Siquijor was transferred from the Central Visayas Region to the Negros Island Region following the signing of Republic Act No. 12000 by President Bongbong Marcos.

== Geography ==
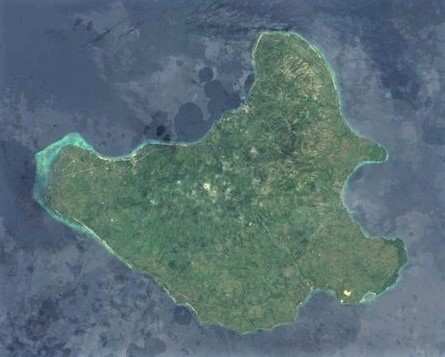
Satellite image of Siquijor Island

Siquijor Average annual temperature in Siquijor is 27·6°C Humidity 75–85%

Climate chart (precipitation, max. and min. temperature)
J	F	M	A	M	J	J	A	S	O	N	D
- █ Average max. and min. temperatures in °C
- █ Precipitation totals in mm
- Source: Climate: Siquijor
Imperial conversion
J	F	M	A	M	J	J	A	S	O	N	D
- █ Average max. and min. temperatures in °F
- █ Precipitation totals in inches

Siquijor is an island province in Negros Island Region. It is located in the Bohol Sea and lies south of Cebu across the Cebu Strait, southeast of Negros, southwest of Bohol, and north of Mindanao. Panglao Island, which is part of Bohol, has a similar soil composition found throughout Siquijor.

With a land area of 343.5 square kilometres (132.6 sq mi) and a coastline 102 kilometres (63 mi) long, Siquijor is the third-smallest province of the Philippines, both in terms of population and land area, after Camiguin and Batanes.

=== Topography ===
The island lies about 19 kilometres (12 mi) east of the nearest point on southern Negros, 25 kilometres (16 mi) southeast of Cebu, 30 kilometres (19 mi) southwest of Bohol, and 45 kilometres (28 mi) north of Zamboanga del Norte in Mindanao. It is predominantly hilly and in many places the hills reach the sea, producing precipitous cliffs. At the center, Mount Malabahoc (locally known as Mount Bandila‑an) reaches about 628 metres (2,060 ft) in elevation, the highest point on the island. Three marine terraces can be roughly traced around Tag‑ibo, San Juan, on the southwestern part of the island.

Siquijor is a coralline island, and fossils of the giant clam tridacna are often encountered in the plowed inland fields. On the hilltops, there are numerous shells of the molluscan species presently living in the seas around the island. Siquijor was probably formed quite recently, geologically speaking. The ocean depths between Siquijor, Bohol, and Mindanao are around 640 metres (350 fathoms; 2,100 feet).

=== Climate ===
Siquijor has two different climates, dominated by a tropical monsoon climate. All climate is within Coronas climate type IV, characterised by not very pronounced maximum rainfall with a short dry season from one to three months and a wet season of nine to ten months. The dry season starts in February and lasts through April sometimes extending to mid‑May.

Five of the municipalities have significant rainfall most months of the year, with a short dry season that has little effect. This location is classified as a tropical monsoon climate. The average annual temperature in Siquijor is 27.6 °C (81.7 °F), with variation throughout the year less than 2 degrees Celsius (3.6 deg F). The precipitation varies 165 millimetres (6 in) between the driest month and the wettest month, with the average rainfall 1,600 millimetres (63 in) or less.

The municipality of Lazi has a significant amount of rainfall during the year. This climate is classified as a tropical rainforest climate. In a year, the average rainfall is 1,655 millimetres (65 in).

=== Administrative division ===
Siquijor comprises six municipalities. Siquijor, Siquijor is the provincial capital.

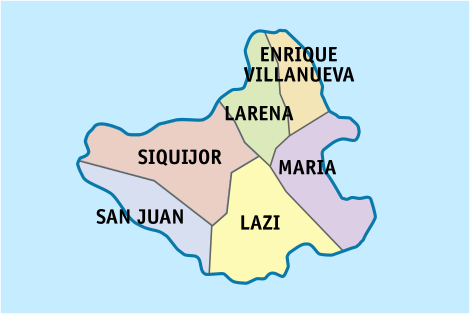
Political divisions

PSGC	City or Municipality	Population			±% p.a.		Area		PD 2024	
		2024		2010			km2	sq mi	/km^{2}	/sq mi
076101000	Enrique Villanueva	6.5%	6,965	5,972	▴	1.07%	28.60	11.04	240	630
076102000	Larena	13.9%	14,933	12,931	▴	1.00%	49.81	19.23	300	780
076103000	Lazi	21.5%	23,092	20,024	▴	0.99%	70.64	27.27	330	850
076104000	Maria	14.1%	15,146	13,383	▴	0.86%	53.37	20.61	280	740
076105000	San Juan	16.1%	17,291	13,525	▴	1.71%	44.37	17.13	390	1,000
076106000	Siquijor †	28.1%	30,215	25,231	▴	1.25%	90.70	35.02	330	860
	TOTAL		107,642	91,066	▴	1.16%	337.49	130.3	320	830
† Provincial capital Municipality

19th Congress of the Philippines

The lone legislative district of Siquijor is the representation of the province in various national legislatures. The current representative is Zaldy S. Villa of PDP-Laban.

== Demographics ==
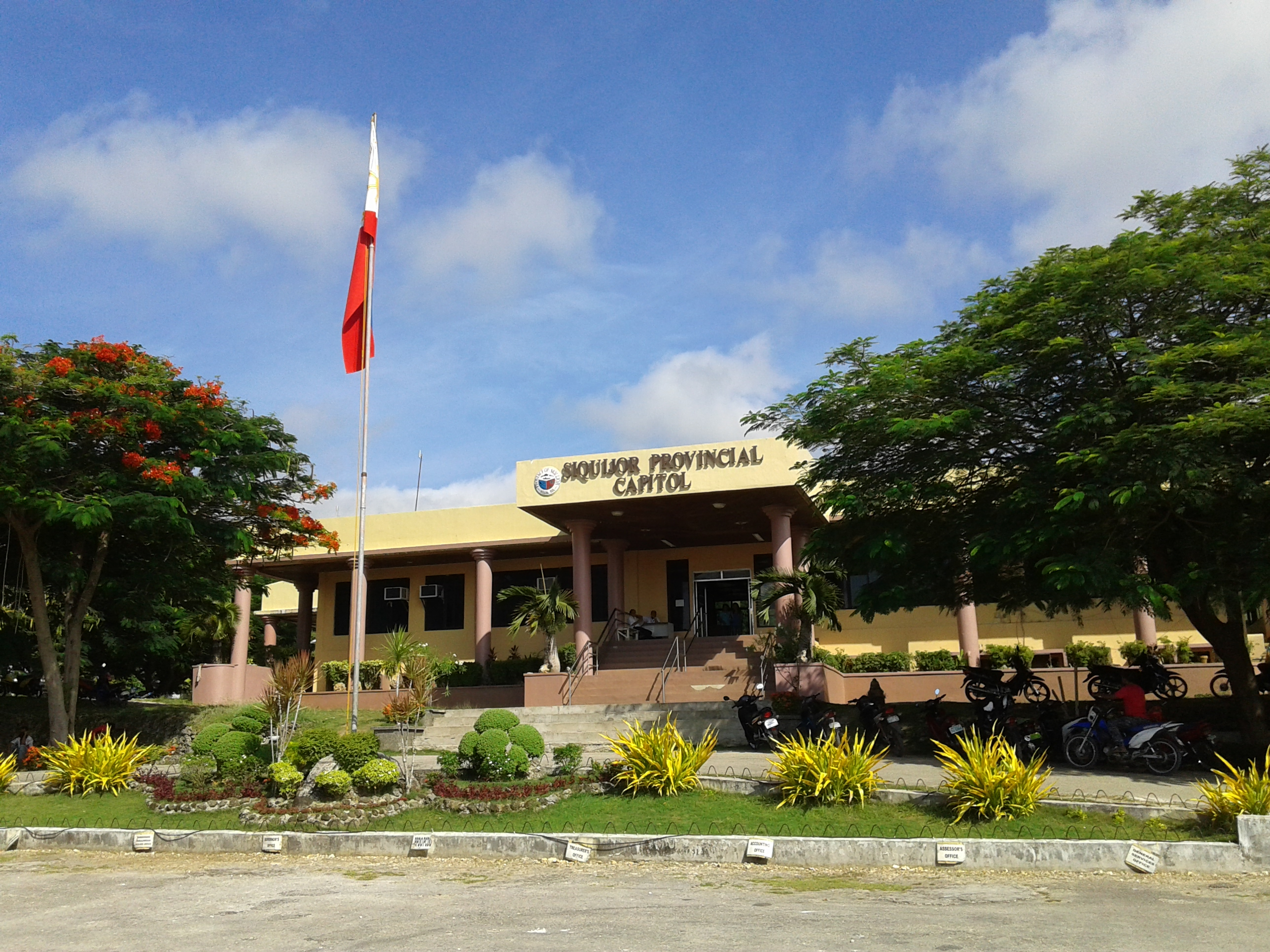
Siquijor Provincial Capitol in the town of Siquijor, Siquijor

Population census of Siquijor
Year	Pop.	±% p.a.
1903	50,156	—
1918	56,774	+0.83%
1939	59,507	+0.22%
1948	57,258	−0.43%
1960	59,555	+0.33%
1970	62,976	+0.56%
1975	69,077	+1.87%
1980	70,360	+0.37%
1990	73,932	+0.50%
1995	73,756	−0.04%
2000	81,598	+2.19%
2007	87,695	+1.00%
2010	91,066	+1.38%
2015	95,984	+1.01%
2020	103,395	+1.58%
2024	107,642	+0.97%
Source: Philippine Statistics Authority

According to the 2024 census, Siquijor has a population of 107,642 people. The average annual growth rate between 2000 and 2015 was 1.09%, lower than the national growth rate of 1.87% for the same period.

=== Languages ===
The main language spoken in Siquijor is Cebuano, with Tagalog and English often used as second languages. Tagalog is understood and used as the national lingua franca, but it is rarely used in everyday conversation among locals.

=== Religion ===
95% of the island's residents belong to the Catholic Church, while the remainder belong to various other Christian churches. Despite the province's Catholic affinities, almost all of the residents continue to adhere to traditional practices that were used prior to the 15th century, albeit these practices have also adopted Christian belief systems as well. Due to the ingrained and indispensable traditional belief systems, the majority of residents have continued to possess a high respect for the natural environment which was revered by the ancestors of the people. Siquijor is known for its unique Philippine culture of blending Catholicism with traditional religious practices – a major part of its people's cultural heritage and identity.

=== Education ===
The literacy rate of 92.5% is one of the highest in the country. The Siquijor State College located in Larena is the only state college in the province.

== Economy ==
Poverty incidence of Siquijor (%)

Source: Philippine Statistics Authority

== Tourism ==
Siquijor has long been associated with pre-Spanish traditions centered around self-help, mysticism, shamanism, and natural healing rituals, something the island's growing tourism industry promotes. One example is the "Healing and Wellness Tour", a guided ceremony and experience for (paying) visitors to experience ancient meditative and cleansing procedures purported to rid themselves of negative energies. The experience is reportedly harmless and simply involves the application of herbs, with smoke and incense being burned, while meditating and being guided by a shamanic healer. There are also a number of other options for spiritual retreats for wealthy tourists interested in experiencing alternative practices with a non-medical, non-mainstream approach.

Nonetheless, official signage is placed around the island, upon which a portrait of the governor is seen, assuring visitors that "magic" and "witchcraft" does not exist, nor has it ever existed, on Siquijor. It is reported that certain elderly or superstitious individuals, even to this day, view the island as cursed and will not set foot there or utter its name for fear of bad luck. The island's enduring reputation as a site of pre-colonial "magic" and "sorcery" has attracted its fair share of interested visitors, and also has earned it the scorn and condemnation of others, primarily very religious (Catholic and other Christian) groups, who view self-help and "natural" healing to be "blasphemous", as it may be seen as a human attempt to "become" or imitate the works of God.

Besides the mystical attractions, nature abounds on Siquijor, and the many ecological and geographical attractions include pristine beaches, waterfalls, coral reef diving, caves, plant and animal life. The coral reefs ringing the island offer some of the best diving in the Philippines for snorkelers and scuba divers. Dive courses are conducted by several dive operators on the island, in the formats of PADI, CMAS*, and NAUI. Two of the most popular natural attractions are Cambugahay Falls and the centuries-old Balete, a species of endemic Ficus tree, both located in Lazi. Mount Bandila-an, Siquijor's highest mountain, has a natural park and butterfly sanctuary located at the center of the island in Barangay Cantabon.

== Transportation ==
Siquijor has two public seaports: the Port of Siquijor and the Port of Larena. These seaports are capable of servicing cargo and passenger seacrafts daily. Destinations include Dumaguete in Negros Oriental, Tagbilaran in Bohol, Cebu City, and Plaridel in Misamis Occidental.

Siquijor also has an airfield, Siquijor Airport, located near Siquijor capable of handling smaller and mostly privately-owned airplanes. Sunlight Air is the only provider of commercial flights to the island three times per week from Cebu

== Gallery ==
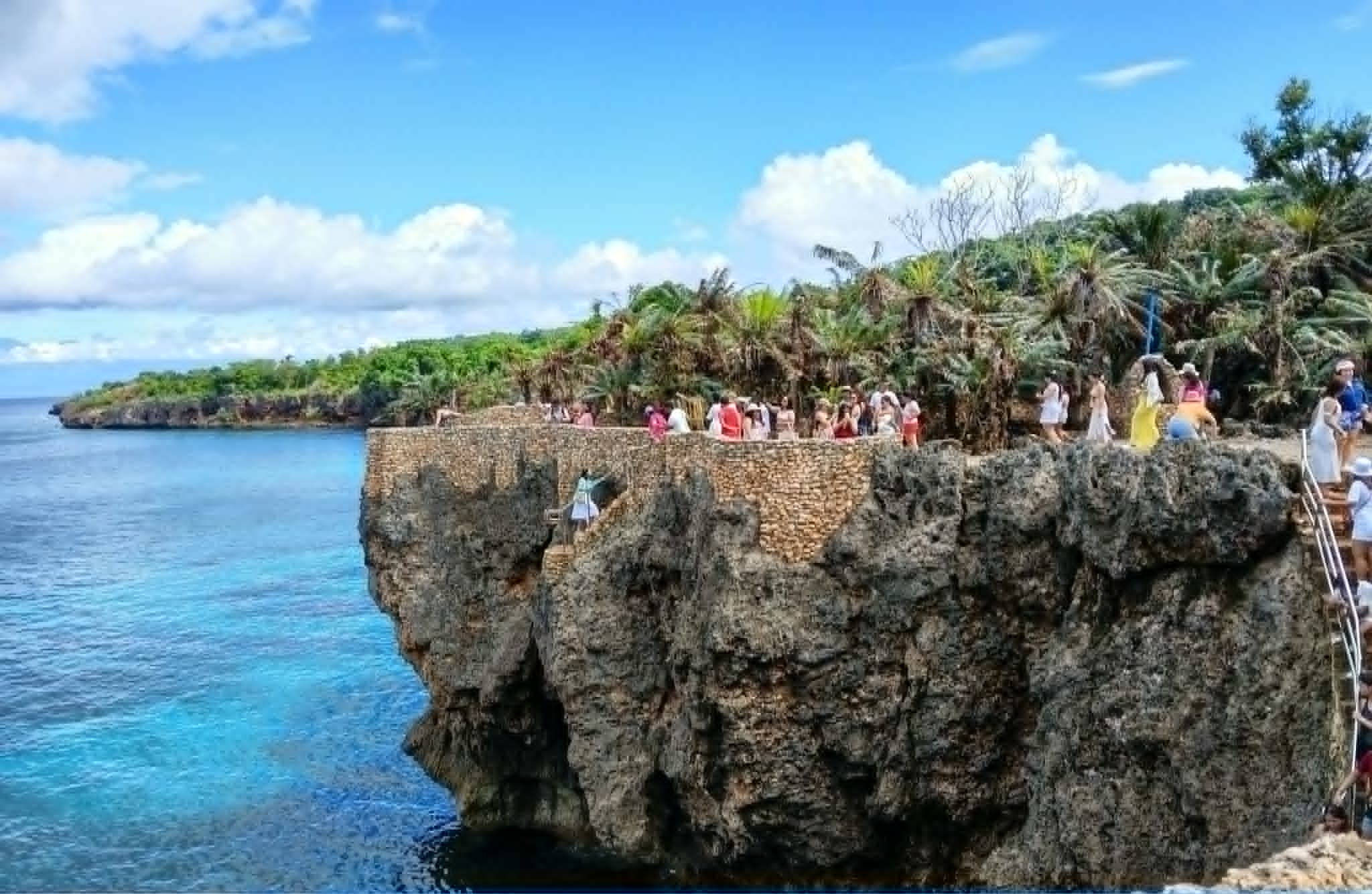
Pitogo Cliff, San Juan

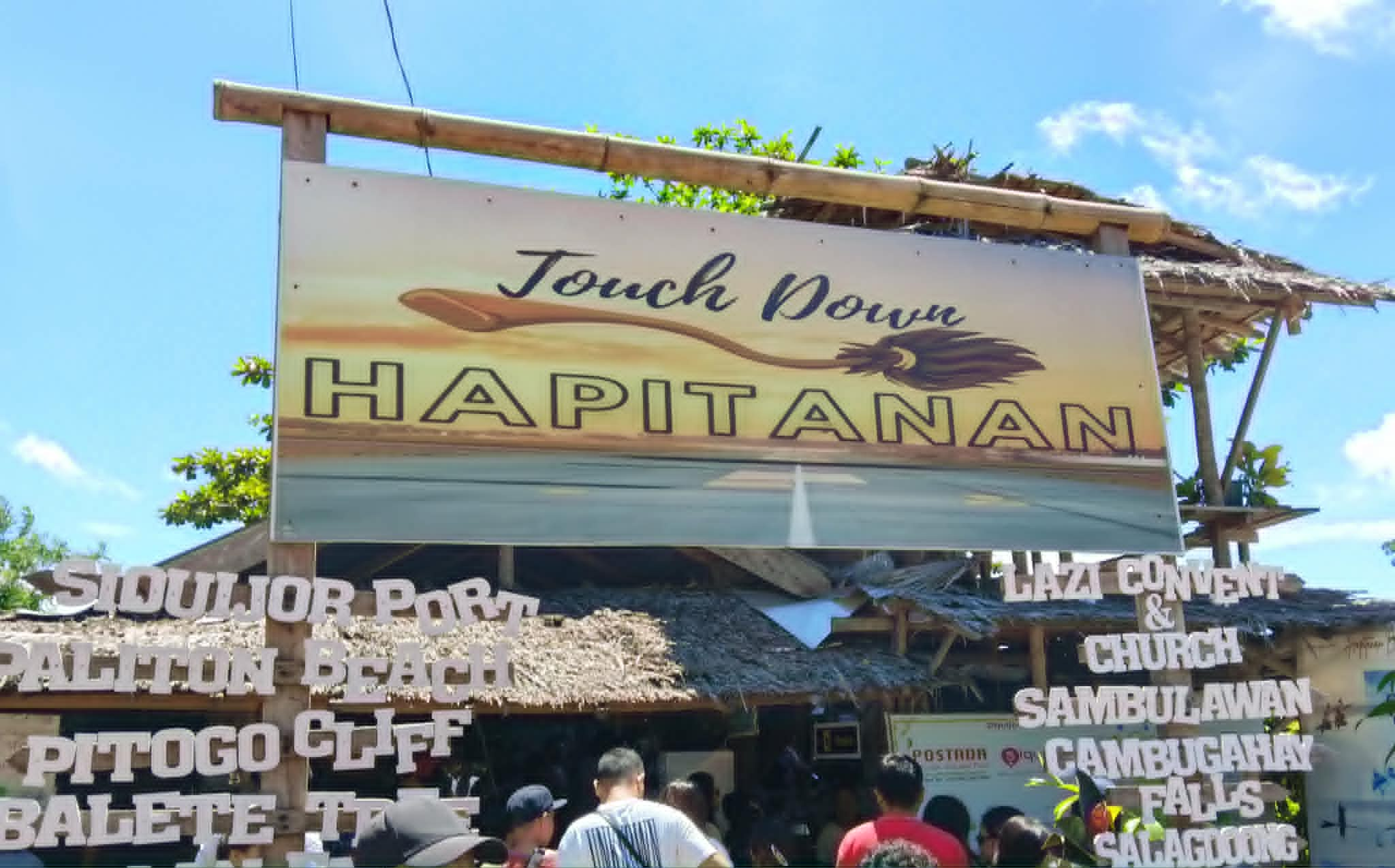
Hapitanan Cafe, Lazi

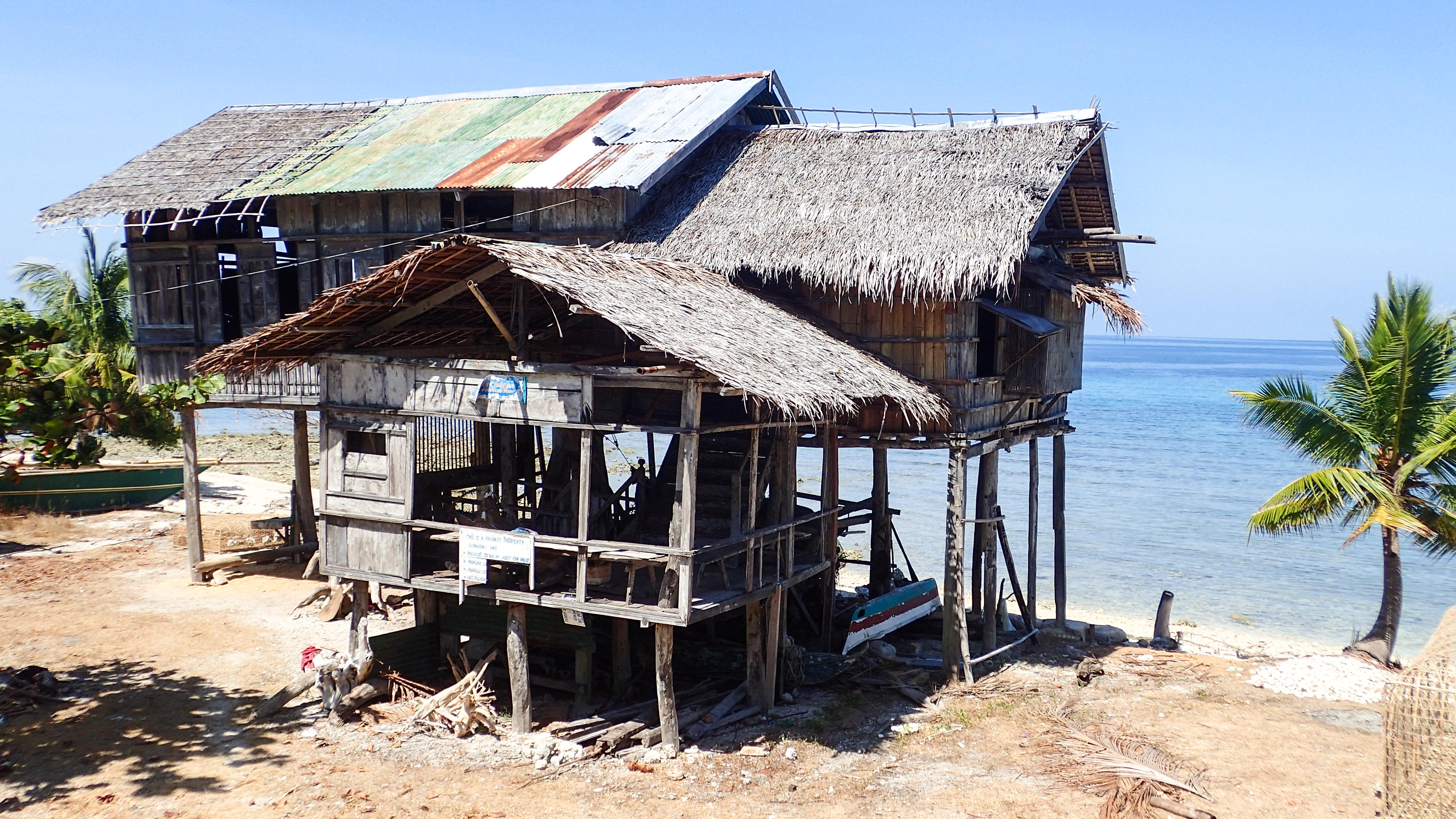
Cang‑Isok house in the town of Enrique Villanueva, a century-old house built on stilts that withstood ravages brought about by time and nature

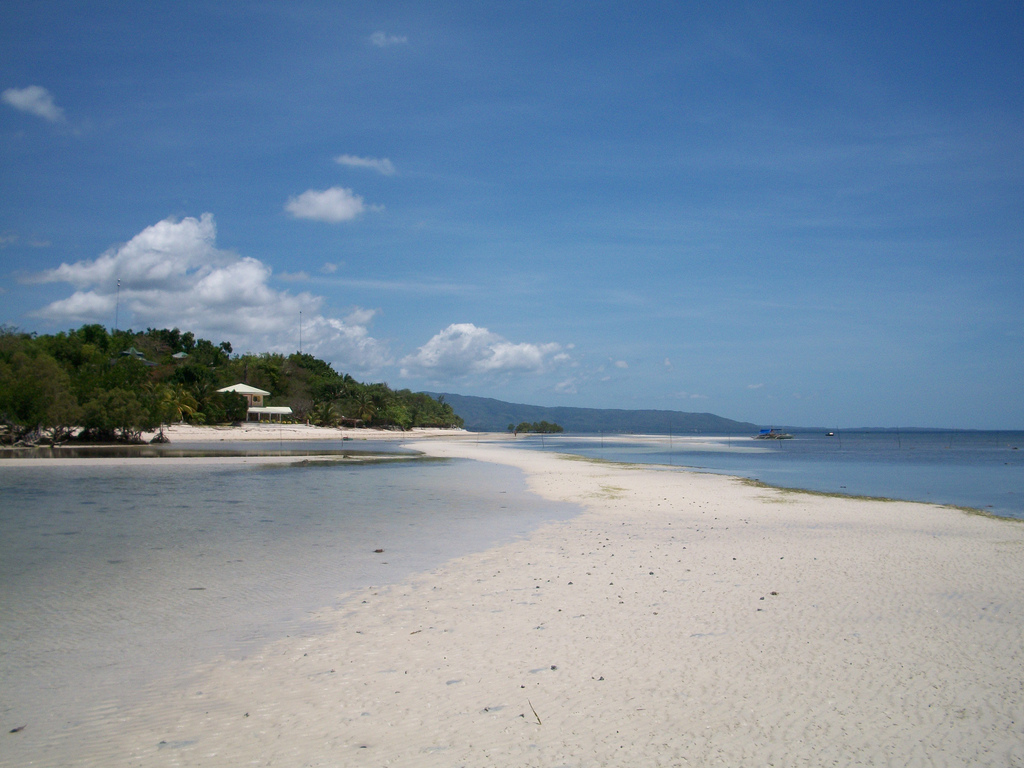
Sandugan Beach, Larena

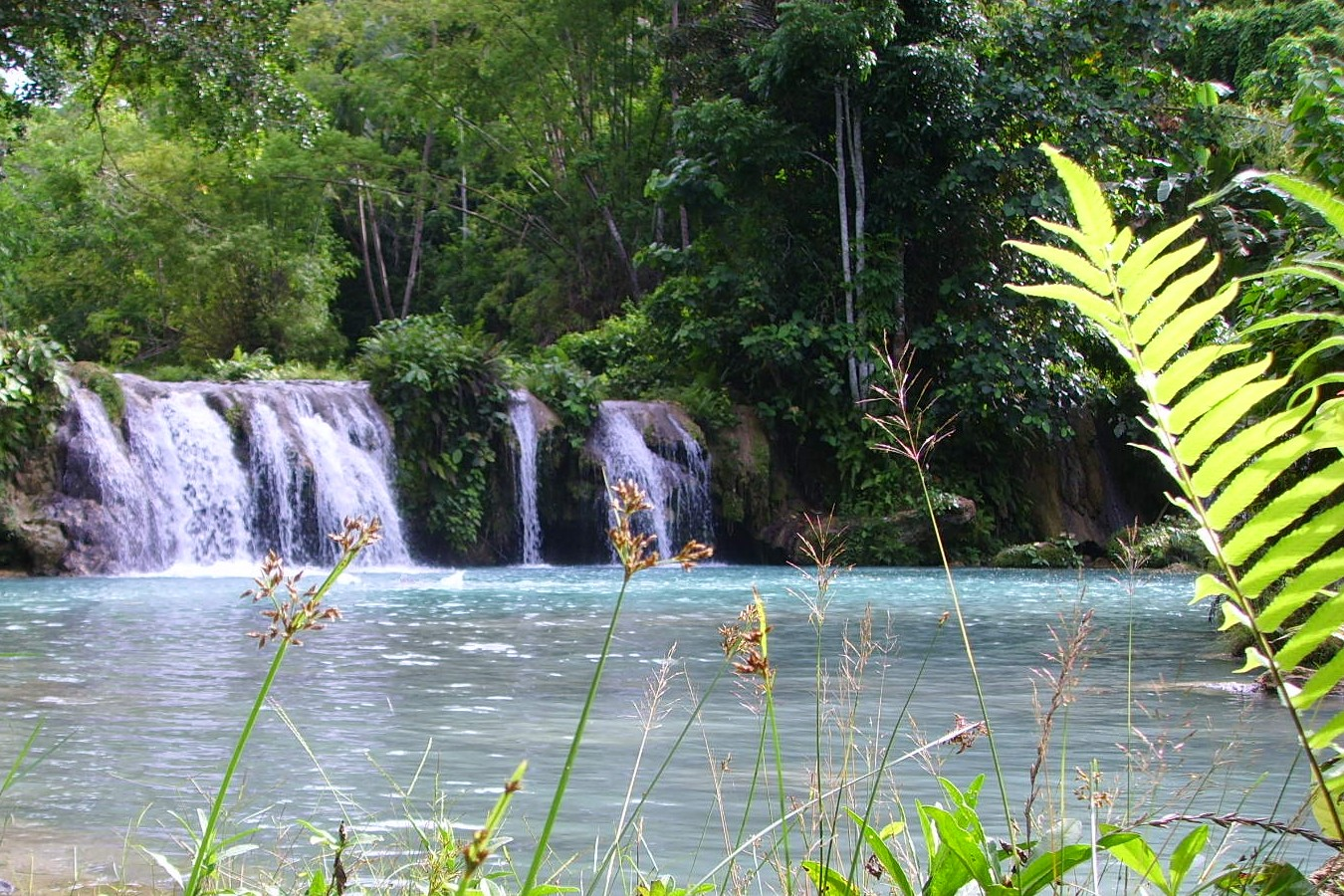
Cambugahay Falls, Lazi

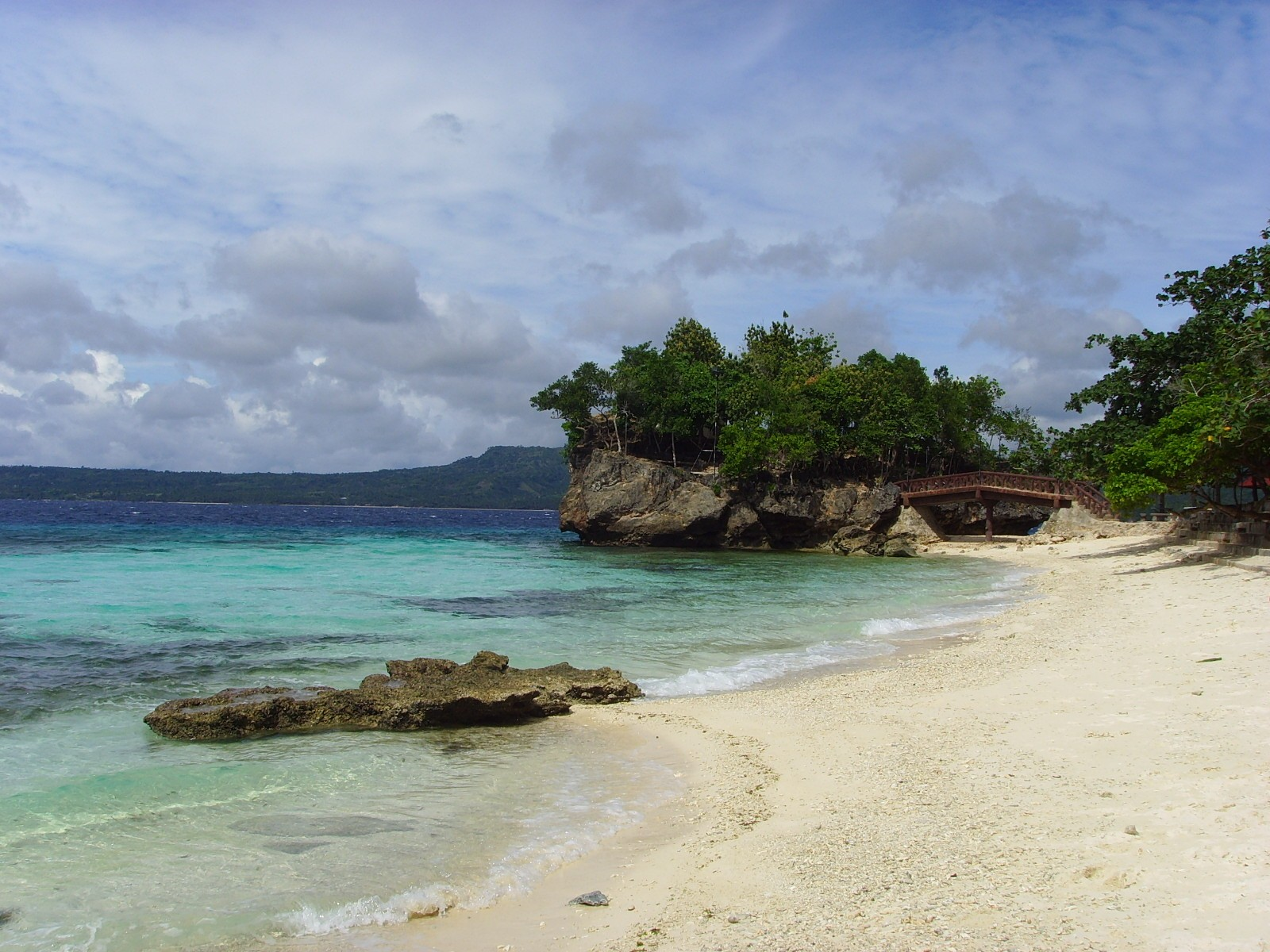
Salagdoong Beach, Maria

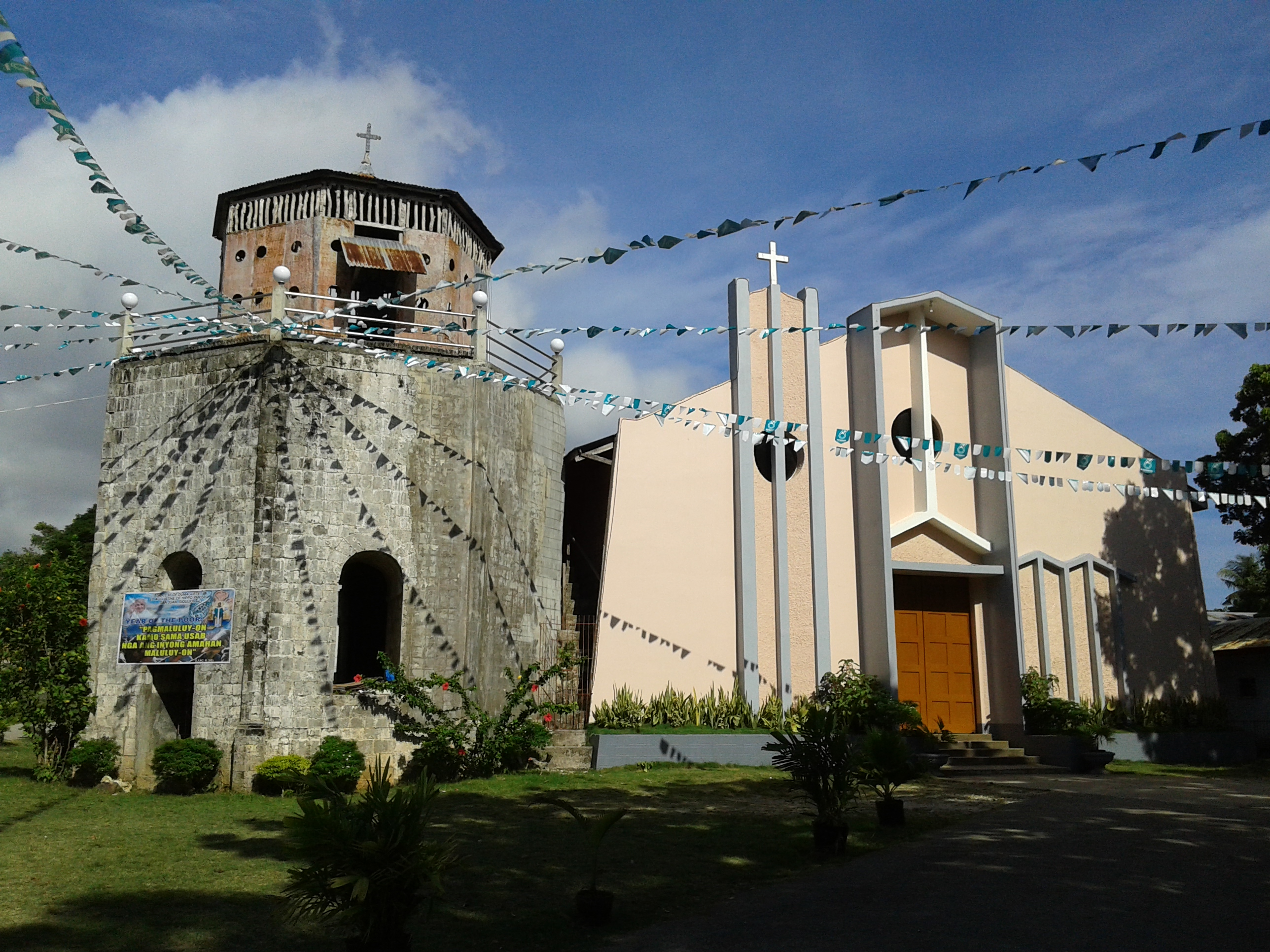
St. Augustine of Hippo church, San Juan

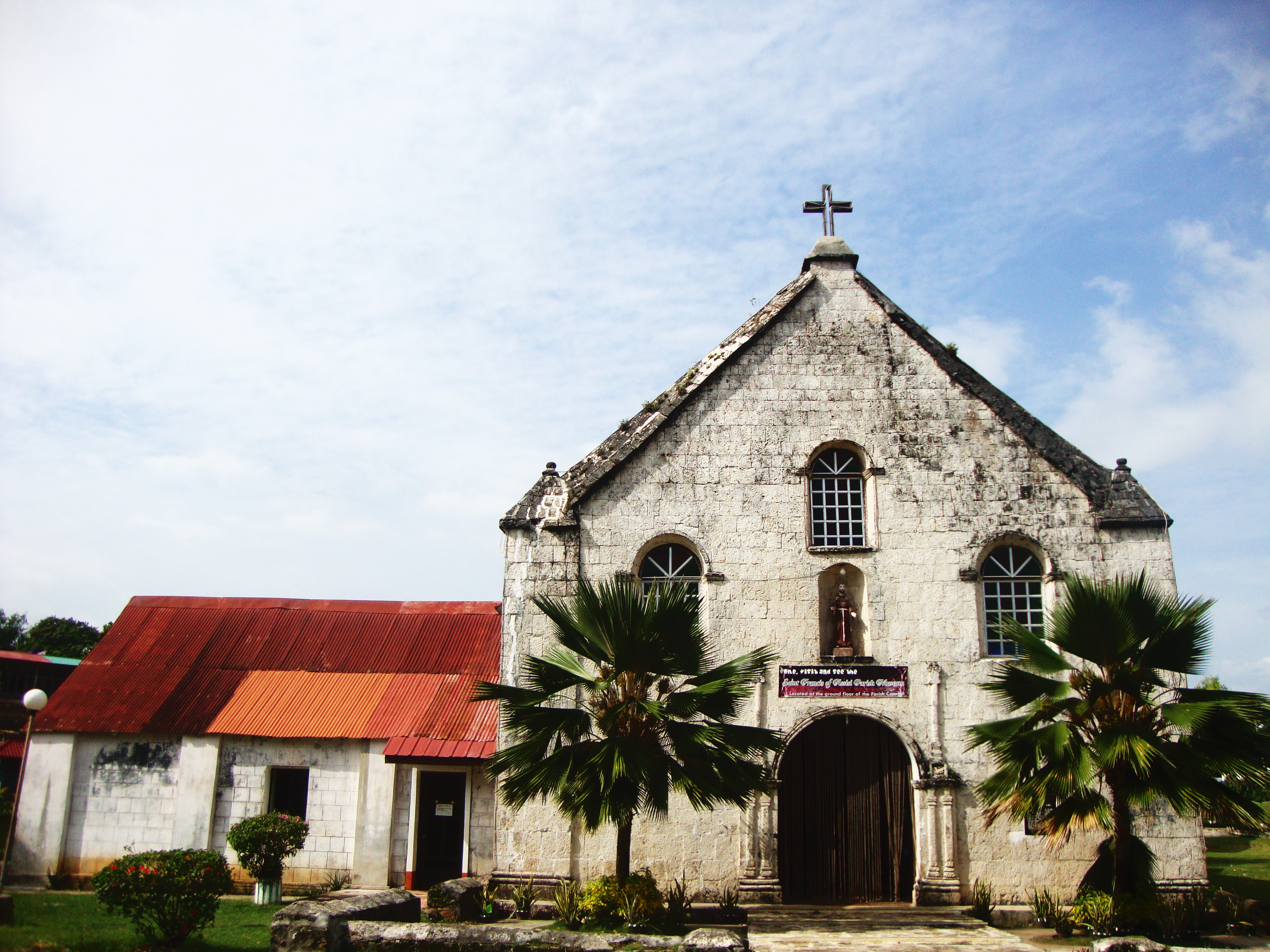
Façade of Saint Francis of Assisi church, Siquijor

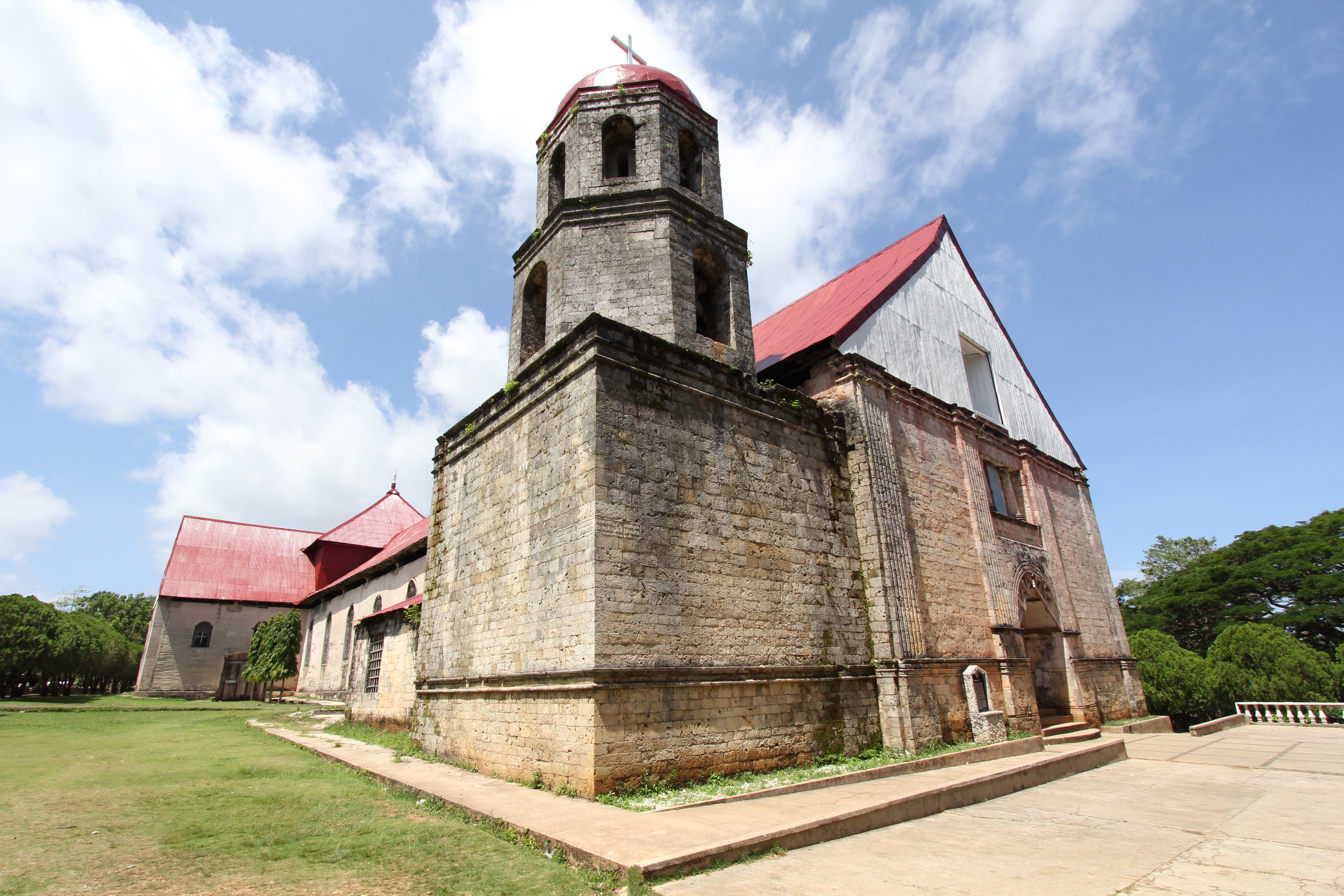
Lazi Church

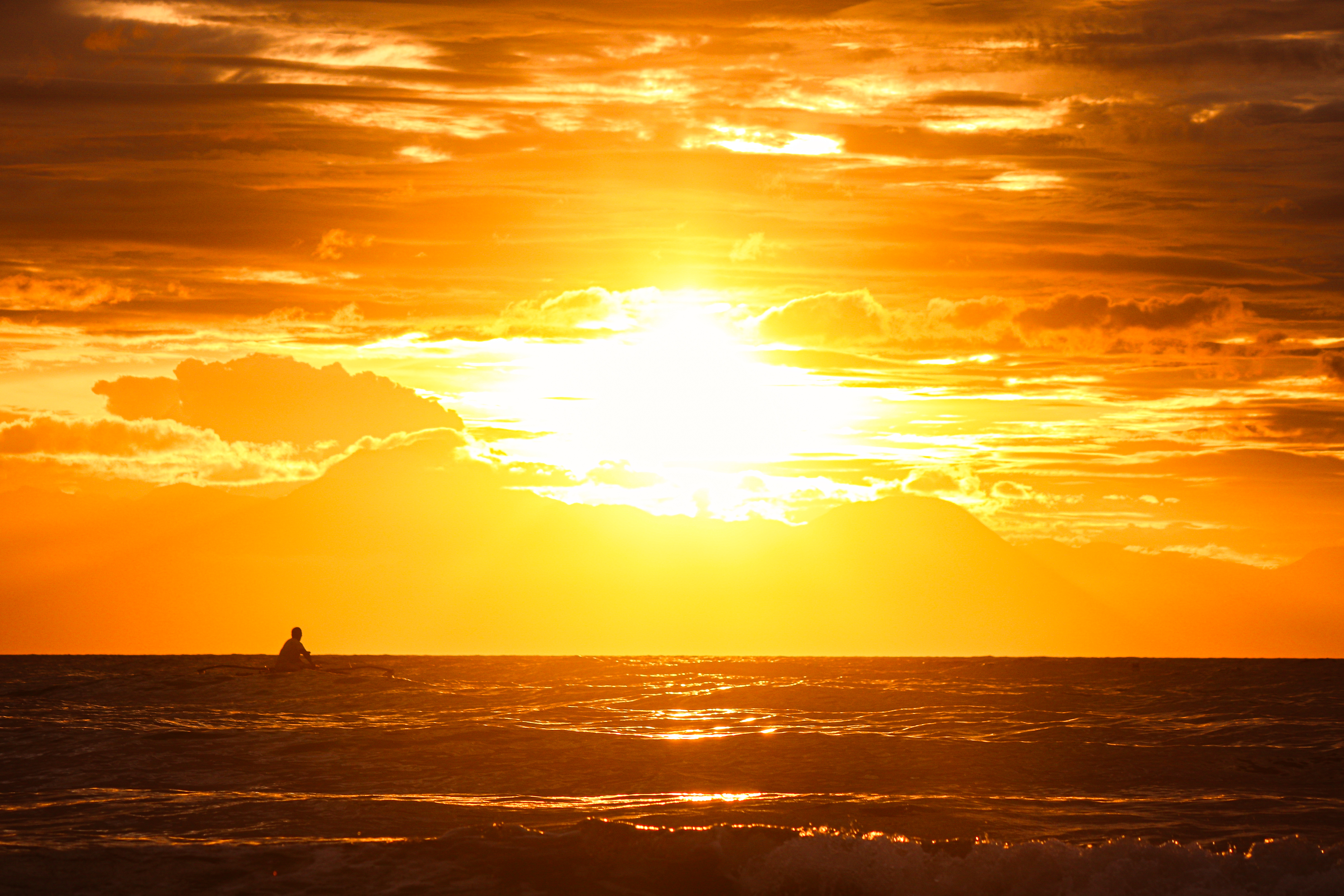
Sunset at the coastline of Siquijor

== Notable personalities ==
- Ryan Jimenez, Archbishop of Agaña
- Julito Cortes, Bishop of Dumaguete

== See also ==
- Provinces of the Philippines

== Sources ==
- Cebu Daily News, Cris Evert Lato & Jun P. Tagalog (October 17, 2007). "Neda: Tourism drove economy". Archived from the original on August 21, 2014.
- Coronas, José (1920). The Climate and Weather of the Philippines, 1903 to 1918. Manila Observatory: Bureau of Philippines.
- DOST, Mario P. de la Peña (October 2, 2008). "Island butterfly sanctuary now open for tourists". Philippine Information Agency. Archived from the original on February 28, 2009.
- Hackett, Bob; Kingsepp, Sander (2006). Sensuikan! Operational histories of Japanese submarines in WW II. Vol. Midget Submarines Based in the Philippines 1944-1945.
- Hayden, Joseph Ralston, ed. (1937). "Fugate, James 1877-1938". Bentley Historical Library. U Michigan.
- Philippine Daily Inquirer, Linda Bolido (October 24, 2004). "Who's afraid of Siquijor?". Archived from the original on January 25, 2005.
- "Geography". Provincial Government of Siquijor. 2012. Archived from the original on October 2, 2012.
- USS Bowfin (2002). "USS Bowfin Submarine Museum & Park". Patrol Summary. Archived from the original on May 4, 2016.
- Visayan Daily Star, Rene Genove (October 10, 2009). "Butterfly sanctuary launched in Siquijor". Archived from the original on October 13, 2008.
