= List of elections in the Philippines =

This is a list of elections and referendums held in the Philippines.

== By type ==
=== General and local elections ===
For much of its history since 1935, the Philippines has been governed as a presidential unitary republic. The term "general election" is not predominantly used in the Philippines, but for the purposes of this article, a "general election" may refer to an election day where the presidency or at least a class of members of Congress are on the ballot. Since 1992, on presidential election days, the presidency, half of the Senate, the House of Representatives and all local officials above the barangay level, but below the regional level, are at stake. On a "midterm election", it's the same, except for the presidency is not at stake.

Local elections above the barangay level, but below the regional level, are synchronized with elections for national positions. From 1947 until 1971, these were scheduled in midterm election years.

Barangay elections are usually held separately from general and local elections.

Year	Type	President	Upper house	Lower house	Local (above barangay level)	Barangay	Constitutional Convention
1895					Municipal		
1898			Revolutionary Congress				
1899		President			Local		
1902					Local		
1904					Local		
1905					Local		
1907				Philippine Assembly			
1909				Philippine Assembly	Local		
1912				Philippine Assembly	Local		
1916	Legislative		Senate	House of Representatives	Local		
1919	Legislative		Senate	House of Representatives	Local		
1922	Legislative		Senate	House of Representatives	Local		
1925	Legislative		Senate	House of Representatives	Local		
1928	Legislative		Senate	House of Representatives	Local		
1931	Legislative		Senate	House of Representatives	Local		
1934	Legislative		Senate	House of Representatives	Local		Constitutional convention
1935	General	President & vice president	National Assembly				
1937					Local		
1938			National Assembly				
1940					Local		
1941	General	President & vice president	Senate	House of Representatives	Local		
1943			National Assembly		Local		
1946	General	President & vice president	Senate	House of Representatives			
1947			Senate		Local		
1949	General	President & vice president	Senate	House of Representatives			
1951			Senate		Local		
1953	General	President & vice president	Senate	House of Representatives			
1955			Senate		Local		
1957	General	President & vice president	Senate	House of Representatives			
1959			Senate		Local		
1961	General	President & vice president	Senate	House of Representatives			
1963			Senate		Local		
1965	General	President & vice president	Senate	House of Representatives			
1967			Senate		Local		
1969	General	President & vice president	Senate	House of Representatives			
1970							Constitutional convention
1971			Senate		Local		
1975					Sangguniang Bayan	Kabataang Barangay	
1978			Parliament				
1980				Local			
1981		President					
1982						Barangay	
1984			Parliament				
1986		President & vice president					
1987	Legislative		Senate	House of Representatives			
1988					Local		
1989						Barangay	
1992	General	President & vice president	Senate	House of Representatives	Local	SK	
1994						Barangay	
1995	General		Senate	House of Representatives	Local		
1996						SK	
1997						Barangay	
1998	General	President & vice president	Senate	House of Representatives	Local		
2001	General		Senate	House of Representatives	Local		
2002						Barangay & SK	
2004	General	President & vice president	Senate	House of Representatives	Local		
2007	General		Senate	House of Representatives	Local	Barangay & SK	
2010	General	President & vice president	Senate	House of Representatives	Local	Barangay & SK	
2013	General		Senate	House of Representatives	Local	Barangay	
2016	General	President & vice president	Senate	House of Representatives	Local		
2018						Barangay & SK	
2019	General		Senate	House of Representatives	Local		
2022	General	President & vice president	Senate	House of Representatives	Local		
2023						Barangay & SK	
2025	General		Senate	House of Representatives	Local		
2028	General	President & vice president	Senate	House of Representatives	Local	Barangay & SK	

=== Regional elections ===
Regional elections are held for the autonomous regions. There had been four autonomous regions in the Philippines: Central Mindanao and Western Mindanao, then replaced by the Autonomous Region in Muslim Mindanao (ARMM), then the Bangsamoro that replaced it. Regional elections were not synchronized with general elections above, but on 2013 and 2016, they were. The 2016 election was the last ARMM election. After the approval of the Bangsamoro in a plebiscite, there was a transition period, and the first Bangsamoro election is expected to be held on 2026.

Year	Autonomous region(s)	Details
1979	Western Mindanao and Central Mindanao	Details
1982	Western Mindanao and Central Mindanao	Details
1990	Autonomous Region in Muslim Mindanao	Details
1993	Autonomous Region in Muslim Mindanao	Details
1996	Autonomous Region in Muslim Mindanao	Details
2001	Autonomous Region in Muslim Mindanao	Details
2005	Autonomous Region in Muslim Mindanao	Details
2008	Autonomous Region in Muslim Mindanao	Details
2013	Autonomous Region in Muslim Mindanao	Details
2016	Autonomous Region in Muslim Mindanao	Details
2026	Bangsamoro	Details

=== National referendums ===
Referendums are on an ad hoc basis. Before 1973, these were mostly used on amending the constitution. Starting from martial law up to the People Power Revolution, referendums became more frequent. After the People Power Revolution, there had only been one national referendum, on the approval of the current constitution.

Year	Type	Ballot question	Result	Details
1935	Plebiscite	Approval of constitution	Yes 96.47%	Details
1937	Plebiscite	Women's suffrage	Yes 90.94%	Details
1939	Plebiscite	Setting up export tariffs	Yes 96.56%	Details
1940	Plebiscite	Creation of a bicameral Congress	Yes 79.14%	Details
1940	Plebiscite	Re-election of president and vice president	Yes 81.67%	Details
1940	Plebiscite	Creation of a Commission on Elections	Yes 77.95%	Details
1947	Plebiscite	Approval of the Bell Trade Act	Yes 78.89%	Details
1967	Plebiscite	Enlarging the House of Representatives	No 81.72%	Details
1967	Plebiscite	Allowing members of Congress to serve in the Constitutional Convention without forfeiting their seats	No 83.44%	Details
1973	Plebiscite	Adopting the constitution	Yes 90.67%	Details
1973	Plebiscite	Calling a plebiscite to ratify the constitution	No 90.96%	Details
1973	Referendum	Allow the president to continue beyond 1973 and finish the reforms under martial law	Yes 90.67%	Details
1975	Referendum	Approval of the president's actions	Yes 88.69%	Details
1975	Referendum	Approval of the president continuing the same powers	Yes 87.51%	Details
1975	Referendum	Selection of local officials	By appointment 60.51%	Details
1976	Referendum	Allowing martial law to continue	Yes 90.95%	Details
1976	Plebiscite	Substituting the Regular Batasang Pambansa with the Interim Batasang Pambansa	Yes 87.58%	Details
1977	Referendum	Allowing the president to continue in office after the organization of the Interim Batasang Pambansa	Yes 89.27%	Details
1981	Plebiscite	Approval of the modified parliamentary system	Yes 79.53%	Details
1981	Plebiscite	Prohibiting elected officials for being appointed except in the Executive Committee; Limiting accreditation of political parties to top two parties only; Prohibiting public officers from switching parties mid-term	Yes 78.95%	Details
1981	Plebiscite	Allowing erstwhile natural-born citizens who lost citizenship to own land	Yes 77.55%	Details
1981	Referendum	Holding barangay elections after the 1981 presidential election	Yes 81.09%	Details
1984	Plebiscite	Redistricting the Batasang Pambansa to per city and province	Yes 83.94%	Details
1984	Plebiscite	Abolishing the executive committee and restoring the vice presidency	Yes 82.99%	Details
1984	Plebiscite	Allowing indigents to possess public lands by grants	Yes 69.25%	Details
1984	Plebiscite	Undertaking an urban land reform program	Yes 68.59%	Details
1987	Plebiscite	Approval of constitution	Yes 77.04%	Details

=== Recall elections ===
Only officials elected via the Local Government Code of 1991 can be recalled.

These are the recall elections above the barangay level:

Year	Location	Position recalled	Incumbent	Result	Winner	Details
1993	Bataan	Governor	Ding Roman	Lost	Tet Garcia	Details
1997	Basilisa, Surigao del Norte	Mayor	Jesus Jariol			Details
1997	Basilisa, Surigao del Norte	Vice mayor	Romeo Ecleo			Details
1997	Basilisa, Surigao del Norte	Six councilors	Aniano Busmeon			Details
1997	Basilisa, Surigao del Norte	Six councilors	Alberto Tubo			Details
1997	Basilisa, Surigao del Norte	Six councilors	Juan Digal Jr.			Details
1997	Basilisa, Surigao del Norte	Six councilors	Generoso Saren			Details
1997	Basilisa, Surigao del Norte	Six councilors	Isidro Monesit			Details
1997	Basilisa, Surigao del Norte	Six councilors	Saturnino Lanugon			Details
1997	Caloocan	Mayor	Rey Malonzo	Won	Rey Malonzo	Details
2000	Lucena	Mayor	Bernard Tagarao	Lost	Ramon Talaga Jr.	Details
2000	Pasay	Mayor	Jovito Claudio	Lost	Wenceslao Trinidad	Details
2002	Puerto Princesa, Palawan	Mayor	Victorino Dennis Socrates	Lost	Edward Hagedorn	Details
2003	Agoo, La Union	Vice mayor	Ramil Lopez	Lost	Shiela Milo	Details
2015	Puerto Princesa	Mayor	Lucilo Bayron	Won	Lucilo Bayron	Details

=== Special elections ===
Both chambers of Congress conduct special elections (known as "by-elections" elsewhere) once a seat becomes vacant.

The upcoming Bangsamoro Parliament can also hold special elections for vacancies for seats from its parliamentary districts.

A special election can also be called if the offices of president and vice president of the Philippines are vacant in the same time.

=== People's Initiatives ===
People's Initiative is a common appellative in the Philippines that refers to either a mode for constitutional amendment provided by the 1987 Philippine Constitution or to the act of pushing an initiative (national or local) allowed by the Initiative and Referendum Act of 1987. While the Supreme Court had declared amending the constitution via initiative as "fatally defective" and those inoperable, the Initiative and Referendum Act of 1987 can still be used to initiate initiatives for statues, ordinances and resolutions at the national and local level.

While there had been no referendums at the national level, this has been successfully implemented at the local level, particularly in barangays.

== By date ==
- June 23 – September 10, 1898: 1898 Philippine legislative election
- May 7, 1899: 1899 Philippine local elections
- 1902 Philippine local elections
- 1904 Philippine local elections
- January 15, 1905: 1905 Philippine local elections
- July 30, 1907: 1907 Philippine Assembly elections
- November 2, 1909: 1909 Philippine Assembly elections
- June 4, 1912:
  - 1912 Philippine Assembly elections
  - 1912 Philippine local elections
- June 6, 1916:
  - 1916 Philippine Assembly elections
  - 1916 Philippine local elections
- October 3, 1916: 1916 Philippine Senate elections
- June 3, 1919:
  - 1919 Philippine Senate elections
  - 1919 Philippine House of Representatives elections
  - 1919 Philippine local elections
- June 6, 1922:
  - 1922 Philippine Senate elections
  - 1922 Philippine House of Representatives elections
  - 1922 Philippine local elections
- June 2, 1925:
  - 1925 Philippine Senate elections
  - 1925 Philippine House of Representatives elections
  - 1925 Philippine local elections
- June 5, 1928:
  - 1928 Philippine Senate elections
  - 1928 Philippine House of Representatives elections
  - 1928 Philippine local elections
- June 2, 1931:
  - 1931 Philippine Senate elections
  - 1931 Philippine House of Representatives elections
  - 1931 Philippine local elections
- June 5, 1934:
  - 1934 Philippine Senate elections
  - 1934 Philippine House of Representatives elections
  - 1934 Philippine local elections
- July 10, 1934: 1934 Philippine Constitutional Convention election
- May 14, 1935: 1935 Philippine constitutional plebiscite
- September 16, 1935: 1935 Philippine general election
  - 1935 Philippine presidential election
  - 1935 Philippine legislative election
- April 30, 1937: 1937 Philippine women's suffrage plebiscite
- December 14, 1937: 1937 Philippine local elections
- November 8, 1938: 1938 Philippine legislative election
- October 24, 1939: 1939 Philippine constitutional plebiscite
- June 18, 1940: 1940 Philippine constitutional plebiscites
- December 10, 1940: 1940 Philippine local elections
- November 11, 1941: 1941 Philippine general election
  - 1941 Philippine presidential election
  - 1941 Philippine Senate election
  - 1941 Philippine House of Representatives elections
  - 1941 Philippine local elections
- September 20, 1943: 1943 Philippine legislative election
- April 26, 1946: 1946 Philippine general election
  - 1946 Philippine presidential election
  - 1946 Philippine Senate election
  - 1946 Philippine House of Representatives elections
- March 11, 1947; 1947 Philippine constitutional plebiscite
- November 11, 1947:
  - 1947 Philippine Senate election
  - 1947 Philippine local elections
- November 8, 1949: 1949 Philippine general election
  - 1949 Philippine presidential election
  - 1949 Philippine Senate election
  - 1949 Philippine House of Representatives elections
- November 13, 1951:
  - 1951 Philippine Senate election
  - 1951 Philippine local elections
- November 10, 1953: 1953 Philippine general election
  - 1953 Philippine presidential election
  - 1953 Philippine Senate election
  - 1953 Philippine House of Representatives elections
- November 8, 1955:
  - 1955 Philippine Senate election
  - 1955 Philippine local elections
- November 12, 1957: 1957 Philippine general election
  - 1957 Philippine presidential election
  - 1957 Philippine Senate election
  - 1957 Philippine House of Representatives elections
- November 10, 1959:
  - 1955 Philippine Senate election
  - 1955 Philippine local elections
- November 14, 1961: 1961 Philippine general election
  - 1961 Philippine presidential election
  - 1961 Philippine Senate election
  - 1961 Philippine House of Representatives elections
- November 12, 1963:
  - 1963 Philippine Senate election
  - 1963 Philippine local elections
- November 9, 1965: 1965 Philippine general election
  - 1965 Philippine presidential election
  - 1965 Philippine Senate election
  - 1965 Philippine House of Representatives elections
- November 14, 1967:
  - 1967 Philippine Senate election
  - 1967 Philippine local elections
  - 1967 Philippine constitutional plebiscite
- November 11, 1969: 1969 Philippine general election
  - 1969 Philippine presidential election
  - 1969 Philippine Senate election
  - 1969 Philippine House of Representatives elections
- November 10, 1970: 1970 Philippine Constitutional Convention election
- November 8, 1971:
  - 1971 Philippine Senate election
  - 1971 Philippine local elections
- January 10–15, 1973: 1973 Philippine constitutional plebiscite
- July 27–28, 1973: 1973 Philippine martial law referendum
- February 27–28, 1975: 1975 Philippine executive and legislative powers referendum
- October 16–17, 1976: 1976 Philippine martial law referendum and constitutional plebiscite
- December 16–17, 1977: 1977 Philippine presidential referendum
- April 7 and 27, 1978: 1978 Philippine parliamentary election
- January 30, 1980: 1980 Philippine local elections
- April 7, 1981: 1981 Philippine constitutional plebiscite
- June 16, 1981: 1981 Philippine presidential election and referendum
- May 17, 1982: 1982 Philippine barangay elections
- January 27, 1984: 1984 Philippine constitutional plebiscite
- May 14, 1984: 1984 Philippine parliamentary election
- February 7, 1986: 1986 Philippine presidential election
- February 2, 1987: 1987 Philippine constitutional plebiscite
- May 11, 1987:
  - 1987 Philippine Senate election
  - 1987 Philippine House of Representatives elections
- January 18, 1988: 1988 Philippine local elections
- March 28, 1989: 1989 Philippine barangay elections
- May 11, 1992: 1992 Philippine general election
  - 1992 Philippine presidential election
  - 1992 Philippine Senate election
  - 1992 Philippine House of Representatives elections
  - 1992 Philippine local elections
- December 4, 1992: 1992 Philippine Sangguniang Kabataan elections
- May 9, 1994: 1994 Philippine barangay elections
- May 8, 1995: 1995 Philippine general election
  - 1995 Philippine Senate election
  - 1995 Philippine House of Representatives elections
  - 1995 Philippine local elections
- May 6, 1996: 1996 Philippine Sangguniang Kabataan elections
- May 12, 1997: 1997 Philippine barangay elections
- May 11, 1998: 1998 Philippine general election
  - 1998 Philippine presidential election
  - 1998 Philippine Senate election
  - 1998 Philippine House of Representatives elections
  - 1998 Philippine local elections
- May 14, 2001: 2001 Philippine general election
  - 2001 Philippine Senate election
  - 2001 Philippine House of Representatives elections
  - 2001 Philippine local elections
- July 15, 2002: 2002 Philippine barangay and Sangguniang Kabataan elections
- May 10, 2004: 2004 Philippine general election
  - 2004 Philippine presidential election
  - 2004 Philippine Senate election
  - 2004 Philippine House of Representatives elections
  - 2004 Philippine local elections
- May 14, 2007: 2007 Philippine general election
  - 2007 Philippine Senate election
  - 2007 Philippine House of Representatives elections
  - 2007 Philippine local elections
- October 29, 2007: 2007 Philippine barangay and Sangguniang Kabataan elections
- May 10, 2010: 2010 Philippine general election
  - 2010 Philippine presidential election
  - 2010 Philippine Senate election
  - 2010 Philippine House of Representatives elections
  - 2010 Philippine local elections
- October 25, 2010: 2010 Philippine barangay and Sangguniang Kabataan elections
- May 13, 2013: 2013 Philippine general election
  - 2013 Philippine Senate election
  - 2013 Philippine House of Representatives elections
  - 2013 Philippine local elections
- October 28, 2013: 2013 Philippine barangay elections
- May 9, 2016: 2016 Philippine general election
  - 2016 Philippine presidential election
  - 2016 Philippine Senate election
  - 2016 Philippine House of Representatives elections
  - 2016 Philippine local elections
- May 14, 2018: 2018 Philippine barangay and Sangguniang Kabataan elections
- May 13, 2019: 2019 Philippine general election
  - 2019 Philippine Senate election
  - 2019 Philippine House of Representatives elections
  - 2019 Philippine local elections
- May 9, 2022: 2022 Philippine general election
  - 2022 Philippine presidential election
  - 2022 Philippine Senate election
  - 2022 Philippine House of Representatives elections
  - 2022 Philippine local elections
- October 30, 2023: 2023 Philippine barangay and Sangguniang Kabataan elections
- May 12, 2025: 2025 Philippine general election
  - 2025 Philippine Senate election
  - 2025 Philippine House of Representatives elections
  - 2025 Philippine local elections
- May 8, 2028: 2028 Philippine general election
  - 2028 Philippine presidential election
  - 2028 Philippine Senate election
  - 2028 Philippine House of Representatives elections
  - 2028 Philippine local elections
- November 13, 2028: 2028 Philippine barangay and Sangguniang Kabataan elections
