= Barangay elections =

Smallest level of local elections in the Philippines

Barangay elections are elections in the Philippines held in the barangays, the smallest of the administrative divisions in the Philippines. Barangays make up cities and municipalities and are in turn divided into sitios and puroks, whose leaders are not elected. Voters aged 18 and over in each barangay are eligible to vote for one barangay captain and seven barangay councilors. Together, the barangay captain and barangay councilors make up the Sangguniang Barangay (barangay council). Voters aged 15 to 30 vote in elections for the Sangguniang Kabataan (SK), electing one SK chairperson and seven SK councilors during the same election. The winning SK chairperson serves as an ex officio member of the barangay council. When elections for both barangay and SK positions are held simultaneously, the event is called the barangay and Sangguniang Kabataan elections (BSKE).

Barangay captains and SK chairpersons are elected using first-past-the-post voting, while barangay and SK councilors are elected using the plurality-at-large voting system, with each barangay serving as an at-large "district".

While candidates are nominally nonpartisan and do not represent political parties, slates consisting of a candidate for barangay captain and seven barangay councilor candidates are not uncommon. SK slates are also sometimes connected to a barangay captain's slate. Winning candidates serve a three-year term and may be reelected for up to two additional terms. Terms of office for barangay officials are usually extended when elections are postponed as a cost-saving measure.

Winning barangay captains in a municipality or city elect from among themselves an Association of Barangay Captains (ABC) president, who serves as their representative in the Sangguniang Bayan (municipal council) or Sangguniang Panlungsod (city council). ABC presidents in a province elect from among themselves a representative to the Sangguniang Panlalawigan (provincial board). ABC presidents serving on provincial boards and city councils independent of any province elect from among themselves a national president and other officials of the Liga ng mga Barangay.

SK chairpersons undergo a similar series of indirect elections at each level, although there was no national leadership structure at the beginning of 2018.

== History ==
In a 1981 referendum, the electorate was asked if barangay elections should be done after the concurrently-held presidential election; the electorate carried the proposal. The Barangay Election Act of 1982 prescribed that the election shall be on May 17, 1982, terms start on June 7, and that terms shall be for six years.

Postponing barangay elections was done several times despite the 1987 Constitution and special laws like the Local Government Code of 1991 but in 2023, the Supreme Court held that the succeeding synchronized Barangay and Sangguniang Kabataan Elections (BSKE) shall be held on the first Monday of December 2025, and every three (3) years thereafter, pursuant to Republic Act No. 11462. The SC Public Information Office added: "More significantly, the said Decision laid down the criteria to serve as guidelines and principles for the bench, the bar, and the public as regards any government action that seeks to postpone any elections."

According to law expert Michael Henry Yusingco, political dynasties continue to victimize barangay elections, the latest results of which made genuine political competition impossible.

=== Elections since 1982 ===
Sangguniang Barangay
Date	Law	Term		Status	Total barangays	Turnout	
Date	Law	Years	Started	Status	Total barangays	Total	%
May 17, 1982	BP 222	6	June 7, 1982	Completed		19,302,910	66.35%
May 9, 1988	RA 6653	5	January 1, 1989	Postponed to November 1988		—	
November 14, 1988	RA 6679	5	—	Postponed to 1989		—	
March 28, 1989	RA 6679	5	May 1, 1989	Completed	~42,000	18,876,334	67.50%
May 9, 1994	RA 7160	3	May 9, 1994	Completed	~42,000	22,670,532	64.75%
May 12, 1997	RA 8524	5	May 12, 1997	Completed	~42,000	24,322,413	63.78%
July 15, 2002	RA 9164	3	August 15, 2002	Completed	~42,000	26,533,451	70.30%
October 31, 2005	RA 9340	3	—	Postponed to 2007	41,995	—	
October 29, 2007	RA 9340	3	November 30, 2007	Completed	41,995	31,979,309	68.14%
October 25, 2010	RA 9340	3	November 30, 2010	Completed	42,095	34,154,174	70.80%
October 28, 2013	RA 9340	3	November 30, 2013	Completed	42,028	38,721,421	72.11%
October 30, 2016	RA 10923	3	—	Postponed to 2017	41,948	—	
October 29, 2017	RA 10952	3	—	Postponed to 2018	41,948	—	
May 14, 2018	RA 10952	3	June 30, 2018	Completed	41,948	39,977,516	69.67%
May 12, 2020	RA 11462	3	—	Postponed to 2022	42,001	—	
December 5, 2022	RA 11462	3	—	Postponed to 2023	42,001	—	
October 30, 2023	RA 11935; GR 263590	3	January 1, 2024	Completed	42,001	To be determined	
December 1, 2025	RA 11462	3	—	Postponed to 2026	42,011		
November 2, 2026	RA 12232	4	—	Postponed to 2028			
November 13, 2028	RA 12326	5	December 1, 2026	Scheduled			

Sangguniang Kabataan
Date	Law	Term		Age range	Status	Synched with barangay elections?	Total barangays	Turnout	
Date	Law	Years	Started	Age range	Status	Synched with barangay elections?	Total barangays	Total	%
December 4, 1992	RA 7160	3		15–21	Completed	No	~42,000	3,227,926	77.20%
May 9, 1994	RA 7808	3	—	15–21	Postponed to 1996	—N/a	~42,000	—	
May 6, 1996	RA 7808	3		15–21	Completed	No	~42,000	3,340,926	77.89%
May 9, 2001	RA 8524	5	—	15–21	Postponed to 2002	—N/a	~42,000	—	
July 15, 2002	RA 9164	3	August 15, 2002	15–18	Completed	Yes	~42,000	1,980,829	77.37%
October 31, 2005	RA 9340	3	—	15–18	Postponed to 2007	—N/a	41,995	—	
October 29, 2007	RA 9340	3	November 30, 2007	15–18	Completed	Yes	41,995	2,542,408	85.29%
October 25, 2010	RA 9340	3	November 30, 2010	15–18	Completed	Yes	42,095	2,101,405	90.54%
October 28, 2013	RA 10632	3	—	15–18	Postponed up to 2015	Yes	42,028	—	
October 30, 2016	RA 10656	3	—	15–18	Postponed to 2017	—N/a	41,948	—	
October 29, 2017	RA 10742	3	—	15–30	Postponed to 2018	—N/a	41,948	—	
May 14, 2018	RA 10742	3	June 30, 2018	15–30	Completed	Yes	41,948	13,529,267	65.51%
May 12, 2020	RA 11462	3	—	15–30	Postponed to 2022	—N/a	42,001	—	
December 5, 2022	RA 11462	3	—	15–30	Postponed to 2023	—N/a	42,001	—	
October 30, 2023	RA 11935; GR 263590	3	January 1, 2024	15–30	Completed	Yes	42,001	To be determined	
December 1, 2025	RA 11462	3	January 1, 2026	15–30	Postponed to 2026	—N/a	42,011		
November 2, 2026	RA 12232	4	December 1, 2026	15–30	Postponed to 2028	—N/a	42,011		
November 13, 2028	RA 12326	5	December 1, 2026	15–30	Scheduled	Yes			

== Indirect elections ==
=== Barangay captain ===
Barangay captain
Municipal chapter

Barangay captain
Component city chapter
Provincial chapter
National chapter

Barangay captain
Highly urbanized or independent component city chapter

=== SK chairperson ===
SK chairperson
Municipal chapter

SK chairperson
Component city chapter
Provincial chapter

SK chairperson
Highly urbanized or independent component city chapter

== See also ==
- Local government in the Philippines
- List of cities and municipalities in the Philippines
