= Vitalez =

Barangay in Parañaque, Metro Manila, Philippines

- Barangay
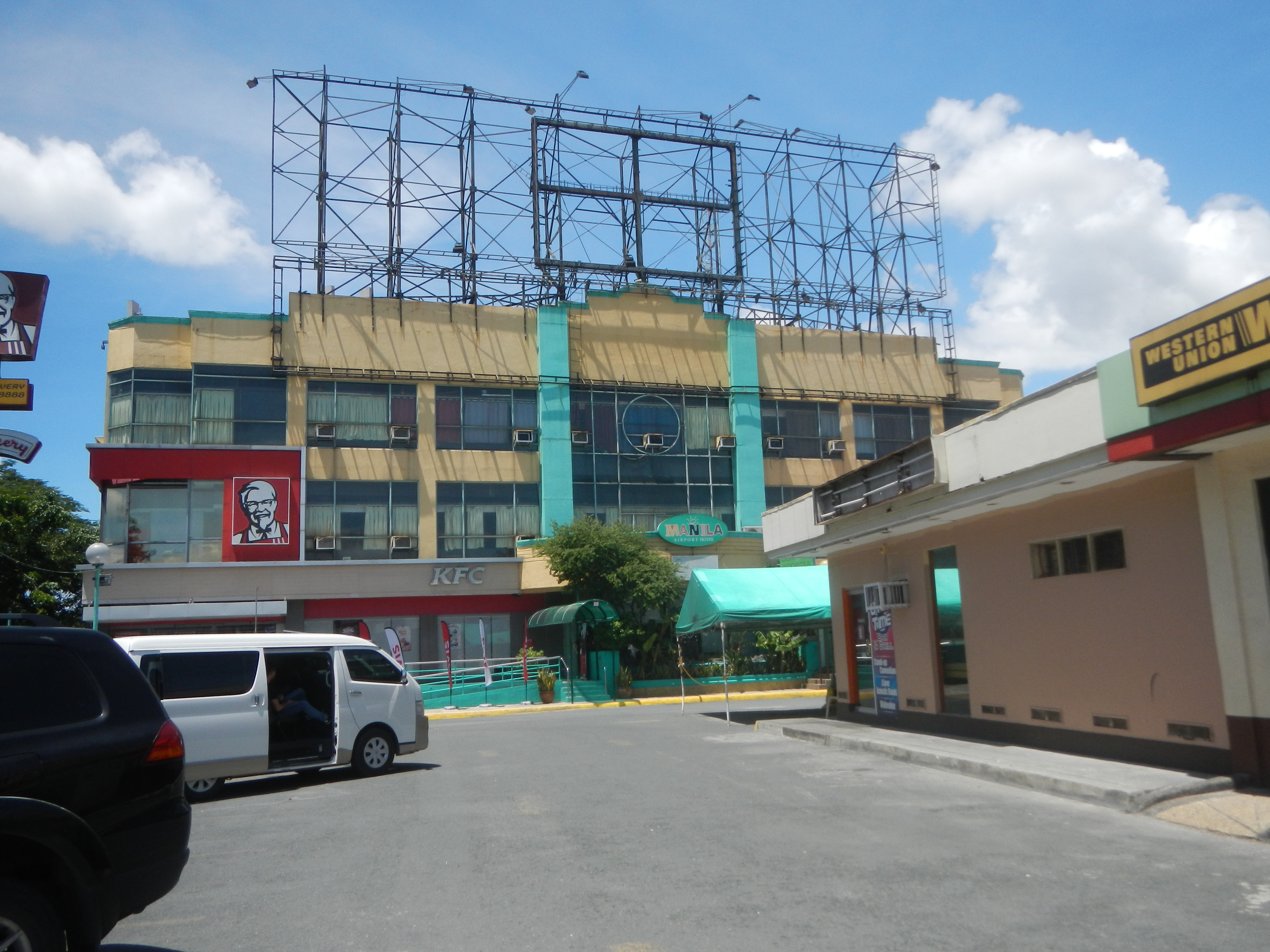
- Manila Airport Hotel

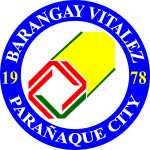
- Seal
- Map of Vitalez and the location of the barangay hall
- Vitalez's location within Metro Manila Vitalez's location within Luzon Vitalez's location within the Philippines
- Coordinates: 14°30′29.68″N 121°0′21.42″E
- Country: Philippines
- Region: Metro Manila
- City: Parañaque
- District: District 1
- Created: April 3, 1978

Government
  - Type: Sangguniang Barangay
  - Barangay Captain: Alexander Alvarez
  - Barangay Councilor: Daniel Abad; Lambert Feliciano; Misa Ralston; Ado Canlas; Divina Fajarillo; Allan Gonzales; Rommel Dauigoy
  - Sangguniang Kabataan Chairperson: Jonika Angel Quilpio

Area
  - Total: 21.52 ha (53.2 acres)

Population (2024)
  - Total: 5,477
- Time zone: UTC+08:00
- ZIP Code: 1700

Vitalez, officially Barangay Vitalez, is an urban barangay located in the first district of Parañaque, Philippines. Located near Ninoy Aquino International Airport, it is the smallest barangay in the city. As of the 2024 census, the population was 5,477. The barangay was created on April 3, 1978.

== Etymology ==
According to an October 2020 infographic by Marvin Lopez, shared by the Parañaque City Public Library, Vitalez was named after the Vitalez Compound, which the barangay encompasses. In the case Office of the City Mayor of Parañaque City, et al. v. Mario D. Ebio, et al. (G.R. No. 178411), it was claimed that a 406-square-meter (0.0406 ha) parcel of land in the compound was originally owned by Jose Vitalez.

== History ==
The land where Vitalez is situated today was once part of Nichols Field, a United States military airfield located south of Manila. In 1957, the then-barrio of Tambo in Parañaque acquired that land, while majority of the airfield was transferred to Pasay, and made it a sitio called Buli. Vitalez was created as an independent barangay on April 3, 1978, after then-President Ferdinand Marcos signed Presidential Decree No. 1327, detaching the Airlane Village, Baltao, Gat Mendoza, Jetlane Village, and Vitalez subdivisions from Tambo.

== Geography ==
Vitalez is the smallest barangay in Parañaque, with its land area totaling 21.52 hectares (215,200 m^{2}). The barangay is bordered to the west, north, and east by Barangays 196, 197, and 198 in Pasay, separated by Cut-Cut Creek, and to the south by Barangay Santo Niño in Parañaque.

== Demographics ==
Historical population
Year	Population	±%
1980	3,293	—
1985^{*}	—	—
1990	3,543	—
1995	3,424	−3.4%
2000	3,166	−7.5%
2007^{**}	3,886	+22.7%
2010	4,518	+16.3%
2015	5,634	+24.7%
2020	5,100	−9.5%
2024	5,477	+7.4%
* No census was held in 1985 due to a political and economic crisis ** Census was delayed from the original 2005 due to the reenacted budget that lasted until 2006; Source: National Census and Statistics Office (1980 and 1990 census), National Statistics Office (1995, 2000, 2007, and 2010 census), and Philippine Statistics Authority (2015, 2020, and 2024 census)

As of the 2024 Philippine census, there were 5,477 residents living in Vitalez.

== Government ==
Rogelio Gatchalian became barangay captain (Filipino: kapitan ng barangay) of Vitalez in 1994 and was reelected in 1997. He was succeeded by his wife Teresita in 2002. Alexander Alvarez won the position during the barangay elections in 2013, and again in 2018 and 2023. As the incumbent barangay captain, Alvarez is assisted by current barangay councilors (Filipino: barangay kagawad) Daniel Abad, Lambert Feliciano, Misa Ralston, Ado Canlas, Divina Fajarillo, Allan Gonzales, and Rommel Dauigoy. Jonika Angel Quilpio is the current chairperson of the Sangguniang Kabataan.

== Education ==
One public elementary school can be found in Vitalez: Rogelio G. Gatchalian Elementary School. The school began operations in June 2002 as Vitalez Elementary School and was renamed in August 2003 in honor of the late namesake barangay captain. As of 2017, the barangay has one day care center with one day care worker serving 92 children.

== Landmarks ==
The Manila Airport Hotel is situated at Airlane Village in Vitalez, within the Ninoy Aquino International Airport Terminal 1 complex. Cargohaus, a service provider of bonded warehouse and logistics, has a building inside the barangay. It houses offices for businesses such as the logistics companies Air21 and U-Freight.

== Transportation ==
As of 2018, Vitalez has a total road network of 3.3 kilometers. Pedicabs are the most prevalent transportation used to ply around the barangay.
