= Liga ng mga Barangay =

Formal organization in the Philippines

Liga ng mga Barangay sa Pilipinas
- Headquarters: 1401 Prestige Towers, Emerald Avenue, Ortigas Center, Pasig
- Members: ~42,000
- National President: Maria Katrina Jessica G. Dy
- Website: ligangbarangay.com

The Liga ng mga Barangay sa Pilipinas (Note: lit. 'league of barangays in the Philippines') and the Asosasyon ng mga Kapitan ng Barangay (Note: lit. 'association of barangay captains') are formal organizations representing all barangays in the Philippines. Presently, almost 42,000 barangays are part of the organization, making it the association of Philippine local government units with the largest membership.

The current association is the latest form of an organization that has been known by various names in the past, such as the Barrio Lieutenants’ Association of the Philippines (BLAP), the Association of Barangay Councils (ABC), and the Pambansang Katipunan ng mga Barangay (PKB; lit. 'national association of barangays').

Each barangay is represented in the league by its barangay captain. In case of the absence or incapacity of the barangay captain, a barangay councilor shall serve as its representative after being elected for this purpose by its members.

== History ==
The Liga ng mga Barangay began with the election in July 1992, of its first National President, Alex David from Caloocan.

The Liga ng mga Barangay is the largest of local government associations whose members come from the grassroots level. It represents a membership of almost 42,000 barangays.

The Liga began in 1958 with the organization of the Barrio Lieutenants’ Association of the Philippines (BLAP) organized through the assistance of the now-defunct Presidential Arm on Community Development. It had then a membership of around 20,000 barrio lieutenants.

In 1972 (1963), Congress enacted Republic Act No. 3590, otherwise known as the Revised Barrio Charter, which altered the title of barrio lieutenant to captain, consequently changing the organization in the Federation of Barrio Captains of the Philippines (FBCP).

Over the years, the membership significantly grew in number with the creation of new barrios. Thus, in 1972, the federation boasted a membership of 33,700.

A few years following the declaration of Martial Law on September 21, 1972, the barrio was renamed into barangay. This paved the way for the organizational restructuring of the entire federation. Then, the former Department of Local Government and Community Development (DLGCD) issued Memorandum Circular No. 74-62 dated November 19, 1974, which mandated a change in the mode of membership of the federation. What was once a federation of only the heads of the different barrios became a federation which included the entire barrio councils. The mode of membership was no longer by individual barrio captain but by council. This tremendously increased the membership of the federation which has now reached approximately 40,000 barangays nationwide.

Subsequently, a reorganization of the entire federation, then known as the Association of Barangay Councils (ABC) from the national down to the barangay level, was effected. The chapters at the municipal and city levels were called the Municipal Association of Barangay Councils (MABC) and the City Association of Barangay Councils (CABC) while at the provincial and regional levels, they were known as the Provincial Federation of the Association of Barangay Councils (PFABC) and Regional Federation of the Association of Barangay Councils, respectively. Later, the whole confederation of the various associations at the different local levels became officially known as the Pambansang Katipunan ng mga Barangay (PKB).

In January 1975, the first national president of the PKB was elected in the person of Mrs. Nora Z. Petines, the first woman president, who hailed from San Isidro, Northern Samar.

With the change in administration in 1986 following the People Power Revolution, the PKB went into a hiatus until its revival and eventual reorganization in 1989. Then, in January 1990, the PKB elected its new set of national officers. Nick Enciso, a Barangay Captain and a veteran journalist from Tagaytay City, won the presidency. He was shot to death on May 27, 1991 cutting short his term, and Alex David was eventually elected as national president.

It was during the latter’s term that the Local Government Code of 1991 was enacted. The new Code modified the name Pambansang Katipunan ng mga Barangay into what is now known nationwide as the Liga ng mga Barangay.

The current league's creation and purpose is mandated by Section 491 of the Republic Act 7160, otherwise known as the Local Government Code of 1991, as amended, which states:

There shall be an organization of all barangays to be known as the liga ng mga barangay for the primary purpose of determining the representation of the Liga in the sanggunians, and for ventilating, articulating and crystallizing issues affecting barangay government administration and securing, through proper and legal means, solutions thereto.

== Organization ==
The League is structured into chapters and each chapter has a President, Vice President and five members of the board of directors. The board of directors appoints a secretary, a treasurer and any other position needed to properly manage the chapter.

The chapters are formed at various levels corresponding to each hierarchy of the Philippine local government units, namely:

- Municipal - members are composed of the Punong Barangay or their representative sanggunian members from the various barangay under the municipality.
- City - members are composed of the Punong Barangay or their representative sanggunian members from the various barangay under the city.
- Provincial - members are composed of the duly elected presidents of all the constituent municipal and city chapters under the province.
- Metropolitan Political Subdivision - members are composed of the duly elected presidents of all the constituent municipal and city chapters under the metropolitan political subdivision.

All duly elected president of any chapter regardless of the level shall automatically become an ex-officio member of the sanggunian at their level.

=== National Liga ===
The biggest chapter at the national level is called the National Liga. Its members are composed of the duly elected presidents of all the highly urbanized cities, provincial chapters, the Metropolitan Manila chapter and metropolitan political subdivision chapters of the country. A Secretary-General is elected from the members of the National Liga and is charged with the overall operation of the liga at the national level.

=== National Presidents ===
Year	President	From
1992 (Note: The Association of Barangay Captains was organized only in 1992.)	Alex David	Barangay 77, Caloocan
1994	Alex David	Barangay 77, Caloocan
1997	James Marty Lim	Barangay II, Gasan, Marinduque
2002	James Marty Lim	Barangay II, Gasan, Marinduque
2008	RJ Echiverri	Barangay 84, Caloocan
2010	RJ Echiverri	Barangay 84, Caloocan
2013	Edmund Abesamis Jr	Poblacion I, Peñaranda, Nueva Ecija
2018	Inno Dy	San Fabian, Echague, Isabela
2019 (Note: Dy left office after being elected as representative from Isabela's 6th congressional district in 2019.)	Eden Chua Pineda	Barangay 16, Tacloban
2024 (Note: Barangay elections were held in December 2023)	Jessica Dy	San Fabian, Echague, Isabela

== Powers, functions, and duties ==
Section 495 of the Local Government Code of 1991 outlines the following powers, functions and duties of the League:

- Give priority to programs designed for the total development of the barangays and in consonance with the policies, programs and projects of the national government;
- Assist in the education of barangay residents for people's participation in local government administration in order to promote united and concerted action to achieve country-wide development goals;
- Supplement the efforts of government in creating gainful employment within the barangay;
- Adopt measures to promote the welfare of barangay officials;
- Serve as a forum of the barangays in order to forge linkages with government and non-governmental organizations and thereby promote the social, economic and political well-being of the barangays; and
- Exercise such other powers and perform such other duties and functions which will bring about stronger ties between barangays and promote the welfare of the barangay inhabitants.
