= Luis Marcaida III =

Filipino politician

Luis M. Marcaida III

Councilor of Puerto Princesa
- Incumbent
- Assumed office June 30, 2022

Mayor of Puerto Princesa
- In office February 21, 2017 – October 15, 2018
- Preceded by: Lucilo R. Bayron
- Succeeded by: Lucilo R. Bayron

Vice Mayor of Puerto Princesa
- In office October 16, 2018 – June 30, 2019
- Preceded by: Nancy Socrates
- Succeeded by: Nancy Socrates
- In office June 30, 2013 – February 20, 2017
- Preceded by: Lucilo R. Bayron
- Succeeded by: Nancy Socrates (Acting)

Personal details
- Born: Luis Marimla Marcaida III; March 11, 1973 (age 53) San Fernando, Pampanga, Philippines
- Party: PFP (2024–present)
- Other political affiliations: Independent (2012–2015; 2021–2024); Aksyon (2018–2021); NPC (2015–2018)

Luis Marimla Marcaida III (born March 11, 1973, in San Fernando) is a Filipino politician who previously served as SK Federation President, Punong Barangay of Bancao-Bancao, City Councilor, interim mayor and as vice-mayor of Puerto Princesa, Palawan, Philippines.

== Early life and education ==
Marcaida was born on March 11, 1973, in San Jose Barangay San Fernando, Pampanga, Philippines to former provincial prosecutor Luis Roxas Marcaida II and Immaculada Marimla Marcaida. He is the youngest of six children. He has an AB in political science.

== Political career ==
Marcaida was elected president of the Sangguniang Kabataan Federation in Puerto Princesa in 1996 and 2002. After his terms, he became the youngest punong barangay in the Bancao-Bancao neighborhood. In 2007, he won a seat on the city council after running as an independent candidate. At the end of his term in 2010, he was elected as a city councilor.

He was elected as vice mayor of Puerto Princesa in 2013 and 2016, and in 2017 became mayor, replacing Lucilo Bayron after he was suspended from office. Despite initially saying he did not necessarily want the role of mayor, he refused to step down when Bayron returned in June 2017. He eventually agreed to let Bayron resume his position but did not return to his role as vice mayor. Following his release from prison in October 2018 on drug charges, Marcaida did resume his position as vice mayor and filed his candidacy for mayor. He ran on the Aksyon Demokratiko ticket but lost to Bayron by 13,510 votes.

He was reelected as a city councilor in 2022.

Marcaida has authored 216 resolutions and co-authored another 222. Prior to become mayor, he proposed 13 ordinances and co-authors 11 more. He has helped implement Executive Order No. 2, popularly known as the DAMAYAN Program, which aimed to provide basic public services to the 66 barangays of the city. More than 27,000 residents have been beneficiaries of the program. He is also a strong supporter of implementing Executive Order No. 3, known as Task Force BANAT (Bayan Against Narcotics, Addiction and Trafficking).

== Drug charges ==
A search warrant of Marcaida's house was issued for possession of drugs, a violation of the Comprehensive Dangerous Drugs Act of 2002. Police raided Marcaida's house on September 4, 2017, and found "30 sachets of shabu, and illegal firearms and explosives," which Marcaida were planted by Bayron. He remained in jail for a year before being allowed to post P1.2 million in bail in October 2018. He was classed by President Duterte as a "high-value target" on the government's narco-list in October 2017 but was no longer listed in March 2019. Marcaido maintains his innocence.

== Personal life ==
Marcaida and his wife Monette have at least one son, Ramon.
