= Barangay (disambiguation) =

Barangay is an administrative division in the Philippines. It may also refer to:

== Related to Barangay ==
- Barangay captain, highest-elected official.
- Barangay councilor, elected government official in the Philippines.
- Barangay elections, smallest level of local elections in the Philippines.
- Precolonial barangay

== Others ==
- Barangay 143, Filipino television series.
- Barangay FM, an FM radio network owned by GMA Network Inc.
  - Barangay LS 97.1, its flagship station.
- Barangay Ginebra San Miguel, Philippine professional basketball team.
- Barangay Singko Panalo, Philippine television game show.

== See also ==
- Balangay, a type of plank boat
