= List of elections in 1905 =

The following elections occurred in the year 1905.

- 1905 Ecuadorian presidential election
- 1905 Liberian general election
- 1905 Philippine local election
- 1905 Uruguayan parliamentary election

== Asia ==
- 1905 Philippine local election

== Australia ==
- 1905 Ashfield state by-election
- 1905 Rous state by-election
- 1905 South Australian state election
- 1905 Western Australian state election

== Europe ==
- 1905 Dutch general election
- 1905 Faroese general election
- 1905 Greek legislative election
- 1905 Hungarian parliamentary election
- 1905 Luxembourg general election
- 1905 Montenegrin Constitutional Assembly election
- 1905 Portuguese legislative election
- 1905 Norwegian union dissolution referendum
- 1905 Norwegian monarchy referendum
- 1905 Romanian general election
- 1905 Serbian parliamentary election
- 1905 Spanish general election
- 1905 Swedish general election
- 1905 Swiss federal election

=== United Kingdom ===
- 22 local elections (list, among them)
- 1905 Appleby by-election
- 1905 Barkston Ash by-election
- 1905 Belfast North by-election
- 1905 Brighton by-election
- 1905 Buteshire by-election
- 1905 Carlisle by-election
- 1905 Chichester by-election
- 1905 Cork City by-election
- 1905 Elgin Burghs by-election
- 1905 Finsbury East by-election
- 1905 Kingswinford by-election
- 1905 Liverpool Everton by-election
- 1905 Mile End by-election
- 1905 New Forest by-election
- 1905 Normanton by-election
- 1905 North Donegal by-election
- 1905 North Dorset by-election
- 1905 North Kildare by-election
- 1905 Stalybridge by-election
- 1905 West Down by-election
- 1905 Whitby by-election

== North America ==
=== Canada ===
- 1905 Alberta general election
- 1905 Edmonton municipal election
- 1905 Ontario general election
- 1905 Saskatchewan general election
- 1905 Yukon general election

=== Caribbean ===
- 1905 Cuban general election

=== United States ===
- 1905 New York state election

==== United States gubernatorial ====
- 1905 Massachusetts gubernatorial election
- 1905 Ohio gubernatorial election
- 1905 Rhode Island gubernatorial election
- 1905 United States gubernatorial elections
- 1905 Virginia gubernatorial election

==== United States House of Representatives ====
- 1905 Illinois's 14th congressional district special election
- 1905 United States House of Representatives elections

==== United States Senate ====
- 1904 and 1905 United States Senate elections
- 1905–06 United States Senate elections
- United States Senate election in California, 1905
- United States Senate election in Massachusetts, 1905
- United States Senate election in New York, 1905
- United States Senate election in Pennsylvania, 1905
- United States Senate election in Wisconsin, 1905

==== United States mayoral elections ====
- 1905 Boston mayoral election
- 1905 Chicago mayoral election
- 1905 Columbus, Ohio mayoral election
- 1905 New York City mayoral election
- 1905 San Diego mayoral election
- 1905 San Francisco mayoral election

== Oceania ==
=== Australia ===
- 1905 South Australian state election
- 1905 Western Australian state election

=== New Zealand ===
- 1905 New Zealand general election
- 1905 City of Wellington by-election

== See also ==
- Category:1905 elections
