= 1982 Philippine barangay elections =

Barangay elections were held for the first time in the country's 42,000 barangays for the positions of barangay captains and six councilors on May 17, 1982 following the Batas Pambansa Blg. 222 or the Barangay Election Act of 1982.

== Background ==
Batas Pambansa Blg. 222, approved on March 25, 1982, provided for the election in each barangay of a Punong Barangay (barangay captain) as presiding officer of the Sangguniang Barangay, and six Kagawad (barangay councilmen) to constitute the members of the council, to be held on May 17. As stated, the term of office of these officials should be six years, beginning on June 7. The campaign period was set on May 1–15.

== Barangay officials ==
A barangay is led and governed by its barangay officials. The barangay officials are considered as a Local Government Unit (LGU) same as the Provincial and the Municipal Government. It is composed of a Punong Barangay, seven Barangay Councilors or Barangay Kagawad. Thus, there are eight members of the Legislative Council in a barangay. Each member has its own respective committee where they are Chairmen of those committees. There are three appointed members of each committee.

The Committees are the following:

- Peace and Order Committee
- Infrastructure Committee
- Education Committee
- Health Committee
- Agriculture Committee
- Tourism Committee
- Finance Committee
- Youth and Sports Committee

== Plebiscites ==
Through Proclamation No. 2188 which was issued on April 29, a plebiscite for the ratification for eleven newly created local entities was set to coincide with the barangay elections. The laws specified the municipalities and barangays, as follows:

- Creation of eight municipalities: Banisilan (B.P. Blg. 141) and Aleosan (B.P. Blg. 206) in North Cotabato; Godod (B.P. Blg. 146) and Bacungan (B.P. Blg. 204) in Zamboanga del Norte; Vincenzo Sagun (B.P. Blg. 173) and Roseller Lim (B.P. Blg. 183) in Zamboanga del Sur; Kapatagan in Lanao del Sur (B.P. Blg. 168); and Don Mariano Marcos in Misamis Occidental. (B.P. Blg. 171)
- Creation of three barangays: Industrial Valley in Marikina (B.P. Blg. 203) and New Alabang Village in Muntinlupa (B.P. Blg. 219), both in Metro Manila; and Inasagan, constituting sitio Allere in Salvador, Lanao del Norte (B.P. Blg. 167).

== See also ==
- Commission on Elections
- Politics of the Philippines
- Philippine elections
- President of the Philippines
