= 2013 Philippine barangay elections =

← 2010	October 28, 2013	2018 →

All 42,028 Barangay Captains with Sangguniang Barangay seats

Barangay elections were held on Monday, October 28, 2013. The election shall elect the Punong Barangay, more commonly known as barangay captains, and members of the Sangguniang Barangay, or barangay council, in 42,028 barangays throughout the Philippines whose terms start on November 30, 2013. Barangays are the smallest local government unit in the Philippines.

Elections for Sangguniang Kabataan, known as the SK Chairman, and members of the Katipunan ng mga Kabataan were originally scheduled to be held at the same time but on September 24, 2013 the Philippine Congress voted to postpone the elections for at least a year.

These elections shall conclude the 2013 election cycle that started in May for the members of the Philippine Congress and provincial, city and municipal officials. Upon their election, barangay captains shall hold indirect elections for their cities and municipalities representations in the local councils and provincial boards.

== Background ==
Republic Act No. 9340 mandates that synchronized elections for the Barangay and SK elections to be held every three years on the last Monday of October. Presently (as of October 2013), there are 42,028 barangays across the Philippines.

Several proposals were made to postpone the elections. Fourteen bills were proposed in the 15th Philippine Congress to postpone the election to a variety of dates. COMELEC Chairman Sixto Brillantes proposed postponing the elections to either 2014 or early 2015. Postponement would require amending Republic Act No. 9340 by an act of Congress, signed by the president. President Benigno Aquino III was opposed to postponing the elections.

== Preparations ==
=== Postponement of the Sangguniang Kabataan elections ===
Because of allegations that the Sangguniang Kabataan (SK) was a "breeding ground for political dynasty and exposes the youth to corruption and the practice of traditional politicians" known colloquially as trapos, on September 24, 2013, the Congress of the Philippines passed a bill to (a) postpone the scheduled October 2013 SK elections until sometime between October 28, 2014 and February 23, 2015 and (b) leave vacant all the SK positions until new officers are elected. The bill explicitly prohibits the appointing of officials to fill the vacant positions. Sen. Francis Escudero said the no-holder of officials would technically abolish the SK. The 10% funds from the Internal Revenue Allotment designated for SK activities would be used by the barangays for youth development programs.

=== Special elections in Zamboanga City and Bohol ===
The Commission on Elections decided to postpone the elections in Zamboanga City in October 8 as the city was still reeling from the effects of the Zamboanga City crisis and of massive floods On the aftermath of the 2013 Bohol earthquake, Chairman Sixto Brillantes announced on October 21 that the commission also postponed the elections in the entire province of Bohol. The next day, commission voted to hold the elections in both places to be held on November 25, or five days before the terms of incumbents expire.

=== Gun ban and official campaign period ===
A gun ban went into effect on September 28, 2013.

The official campaign period was one week, from October 18 to 26, 2013.

For the special elections in Zamboanga City and Bohol, the election period and gun ban went into effect from October 26 to December 10, 2013, filing of COCs was November 7–13, 2013, and the campaign period was one week, November 15–23, 2013.

== Election ==
The election was a manual one and not automated as the May 2013 national elections were. The ballots were blank and voters were required to write in the name of the candidates that they wanted to vote for.

In August 2013, there were 54,051,626 registered to vote in the elections.

== Statistics ==
Barangays	42,028
Barangay chairmen seats	42,028
Barangay councilor seats	294,196
Registered voters	54,051,626

== Results ==
=== Barangay captains ===
Party	Votes	%	Seats
Nonpartisan	38,721,421	100.00	42,028
Total	38,721,421	100.00	42,028
Total votes	38,721,421	–	
Registered voters/turnout	53,698,002	72.11	

=== Barangay councilors ===
Party	Votes	%	Seats
Nonpartisan	38,721,421	100.00	294,196
Total	38,721,421	100.00	294,196
Total votes	38,721,421	–	
Registered voters/turnout	53,698,002	72.11	

== See also ==
- 2013 Davao Occidental creation plebiscite; done on the same day
