= 2028 Philippine general election =

A general election will be held in the Philippines on May 8, 2028. All elective officials above the barangay level, but excluding the members of the Bangsamoro Parliament shall be decided on this day.

At the top of the ballot is the presidential election to decide the successor of Bongbong Marcos. The successor of Sara Duterte, who had announced that she is running for president, will be decided on the vice presidential election. Also up for election were the following:

- 12 seats in the Senate
- All seats in the House of Representatives
- All provincial-level officials
- All city-level officials
- All municipal-level officials

== Preparation ==
=== Voter registration ===
The Commission on Elections expects around 74 million voters in the 2028 elections. They announced that the voter registration for this election shall be from November 10, 2026 to July 30, 2027.

== Electoral system ==
In the Philippines, congressional and local elections, excluding the regional and barangay levels, have been synchronized to be held on the second Monday of May every three years, starting in 1992. Presidents and vice presidents have six-year terms, so they are only elected on even-numbered years (1992, 1998, and so on). Elections where the presidency is not on the ballot are called midterm elections, and occur on odd-numbered years (1995, 2001, and so on).

Every seat up for election is voted on separately. Since 2010, general elections have been automated, with voters shading an oval next to their chosen candidate. For executive positions, elections are decided via the first-past-the-post voting (FPTP) system, where the voter has one choice. Elections to the Senate and local legislatures are held via multiple non-transferable vote, where the voter has x number of choices depending on the number of seats up for election (12 in the case of the Senate), and the x candidates with the highest number of votes win. For House elections, each voter has two votes, one via FPTP, and the other via a modified party-list proportional representation system.

The incumbent president, and with some exceptions, senators on their second term, and House representatives and local officials on their third terms, are term limited.

Elections are organized, run, and adjudicated by the Commission on Elections (COMELEC), an independent governmental body. Appeals are allowed under certain conditions to the Regional Trial Courts, the Congress, or the Supreme Court, sitting as the House of Representatives Electoral Tribunal, the Senate Electoral Tribunal, or the Presidential Electoral Tribunal depending on the election being appealed.

== Parties and coalitions ==
As this will be a presidential election year, presidential candidates could endorse a running mate for vice president, a senatorial slate, district and party-list representatives, and local officials, who may not necessarily be of the same party or coalition. According to Joy Aceron, an academic from the Ateneo de Manila University, political parties in the Philippines have been described as "temporary political alliances", or it is argued that there are no parties at all, merely "fan clubs of politicians". Party-switching is not uncommon, and the dependence of parties on personalities instead of issues is seen as a factor of why this is so.

In this election cycle, three forces are seen to contest the various political positions: the Marcos-led administration, the Duterte-led opposition, and the Kakampink-led opposition, so-called after the supporters of Leni Robredo during her failed 2022 presidential campaign.

== Presidential election ==
Incumbent Bongbong Marcos is term limited. This election will determine the next president of the Philippines.

In 2026, vice president Sara Duterte is the first to announce her presidential candidacy.

== Vice presidential election ==
Incumbent Sara Duterte is not term limited, but announced to run for the presidency instead. This election will determine the next vice president of the Philippines.

== Senate election ==
In the Senate of the Philippines, twelve seats are up, of which four are term-limited. One incumbent, Robin Padilla, announced that if he is not running for vice president as Sara Duterte's running mate, he'd retire from politics instead.

== House of Representatives elections ==
In the House of Representatives of the Philippines, all seats will be up. There are currently 318 seats, of which 80% or 254 are from congressional districts, and 20% or 64 are elected via the party-list system.

Congress determines the number of seats, and redistricting laws are expected to be passed that should increase the number of seats to be contested.

== Local elections ==
Local elections are also to be held on this day. Voters elect their officials above the barangay, but below the regional, level.
