= 2018 Philippine barangay and Sangguniang Kabataan elections =

Elections in the Philippines

2018 Philippine barangay elections
- May 14, 2018

41,948 barangay captain positions and 293,636 barangay councilors 5 in each barangay in the Sangguniang Barangay seats needed for a majority
- Registered: 57,378,380
- Turnout: 39,977,516 (69.67%)
Barangay captains	41,948
Sangguniang Barangay members	293,636
League of Barangays in the Philippines National President before election
Edmund Abesamis
Elected League of Barangays in the Philippines National President
Faustino Dy V
- 2018 Philippine Sangguniang Kabataan elections
- May 14, 2018

41,948 Sangguniang Kabataan (SK) chairmen, and 293,636 SK councilors 4 in each barangay in the Sangguniang Kabataan seats needed for a majority
- Registered: 20,626,220
- Turnout: 13,204,059 (64.02%)
SK chairpersons	41,948
Sangguniang Kabataan members	293,636

Barangay and Sangguniang Kabataan elections (BSKE) in the Philippines were held on May 14, 2018. The elections determined the barangay captains and members of the Sangguniang Barangay (barangay council) in 41,948 barangays throughout the country. Their terms began on June 30, 2018. Barangays are the smallest type of local government unit in the Philippines, and their governance is nonpartisan.

Elections for the reformed Sangguniang Kabataan (SK; youth councils) were also held at the same time. These were the first SK elections since 2010. Upon their election, barangay captains elected their cities' or municipalities' Liga ng mga Barangay chairman, also known as the Association of Barangay Captains or ABC chairman, who would also serve on their respective local municipal or city council. The provincial ABC chairman would likewise serve on the Sangguniang Panlalawigan (provincial board). The provincial and some city ABC chairmen would elect the national leadership of the League from among themselves.

The elections were originally scheduled for October 2016 and were intended to conclude the 2016 election cycle that began in May with the election of the Philippine president, members of Philippine Congress, and provincial, city, and municipal officials. They were subsequently postponed to October 2017 and then to May 2018. There were attempts to postpone them further, but Congress did not have enough time to pass a law doing so.

The winning officials were originally to serve until June 30, 2020, but after the 2020 elections were postponed to 2022 in 2019, and again to 2023, their terms were also extended to November 30, 2023.

== Electoral system ==
Each barangay has an elected chief executive, the Punong Barangay, and an 8-seat legislature, the Sangguniang Barangay, of which seven are elected at-large in this election.

The youth also elect among themselves the Sangguniang Kabataan (SK) chairman, who is the eighth member of the Sangguniang Barangay, and all 7 members of the Sangguniang Kabataan at-large. Both barangay and SK chairmen are elected via the first-past-the-post system, while the legislatures are elected via multiple non-transferable vote.

== Preparations ==
=== Postponement ===
On October 18, 2016, or roughly two weeks before the elections, it was confirmed that President Rodrigo Duterte signed into law a bill postponing the October 2016 barangay elections to October 2017. In addition, the subsequent election would be on the second Monday of May 2020, and every three years thereafter. Officials who were elected in 2013 shall continue to serve until 2017.

By March 2017, Duterte expressed that he wanted to postpone the barangay elections until 2020, and replace the barangay officials whose terms are expiring, with his own appointees. This allegedly due to prevent drug money from influencing the result of the elections. His allies in Congress moved to enact a bill doing such. Experts later said that appointing barangay officials is unconstitutional.

On October 2, 2017, President Rodrigo Duterte signed into law a bill postponing again the 2017 barangay and SK election to May 2018. The House of Representatives then passed a bill to postpone the election from May to October, but it was defeated in the Senate as there was no counterpart bill submitted there. At the hearings at the attempt to postpone it to October 2018, League national president Edmund Abesamis, who was supporting the election's postponement defending that it wasn't self-serving, was berated by Congressman Antonio Tinio of the Alliance of Concerned Teachers who branded him as shameless. Tinio added that several barangay officials are term limited and should have been replaced by an election as early as 2016.

=== Nominations ===
As there was no law postponing the elections further, the commission released the schedule for the election. Filing of candidacies will be on April 14 to 20. The eligible ages for the Sangguniang Kabataan elections were changed to 18–24 years old for candidates, and 15-30 for voters. Candidates were required to submit a resumé. The commission also told politicians to keep the elections non-partisan, for candidates to refrain mentioning politicians' names, and for them to lower expenses.

Filing for candidacies was extended until April 21. There were concerns that the number of candidates is less than the number of positions that shall be contested. The Sangguniang Kabataan posts were a concern, with only 181,296 candidacies as opposed to 338,584 positions.

May 4, 2018 will be the start of the campaign period, that will end on May 12. Election silence is on May 13, and election day is on Monday, May 14.

=== Candidates allegedly involved in the drug trade ===
Following the pronouncements of President Rodrigo Duterte, the Philippine Drug Enforcement Agency (PDEA) and the Department of the Interior and Local Government (DILG) released on 30 April 2018, the list of barangay officials allegedly involved in the drug trade. PDEA Director-General Aaron Aquino and DILG Officer-in-Charge Eduardo Año stated that nearly 200 personalities are in the list. PDEA admitted that the said list that were based on existing police and military intelligence reports, lacks adequate veracity hence cases have not been filed against the said personalities in the courts. The list is considered part of the earlier extensive narco list that was partially released by President Duterte in 2016.

== Statistics ==
The Philippines has 42,044 barangays, each with 1 chairperson, 7 councilors, 1 SK chairperson and 7 SK councilors. In addition, the SK chairperson is an ex officio member of the barangay council. The newest barangays are in San Jose, Occidental Mindoro, Asipulo, Ifugao, Dumalneg, Ilocos Norte, and in Navotas, Metro Manila, where the barangays were reorganized. Furthermore, Barangay Rizal was transferred from Burdeos, Quezon to Panukulan, Quezon after a Supreme Court decision became final and executory.

All 96 barangays in Marawi are not holding elections in May 2018 due to the aftermath of the Battle of Marawi. This means only 41,948 barangays shall be holding elections. The commission shall determine at a later date when to hold elections in the city.

Position	Total elected per barangay	National total	Change from 2018
Barangay chairperson	1	41,948	▼80
Barangay councilor*	7	293,636	▼560
SK chairperson	1	41,948	▼147
SK councilor	7	293,636	▼1,079

*Aside from the 7 regular members, the SK chairperson is also an ex officio member of the barangay council.

== Results ==
There was no nationwide campaign, and the election was nonpartisan.

=== Barangay captains ===
Party	Votes	%	Seats
Nonpartisan	39,977,516	100.00	41,948
Total	39,977,516	100.00	41,948
Total votes	39,977,516	–	
Registered voters/turnout	57,378,380	69.67	
Source: COMELEC

=== Barangay councilors ===
Party	Votes	%	Seats
Nonpartisan	39,977,516	100.00	293,636
Total	39,977,516	100.00	293,636
Total votes	39,977,516	–	
Registered voters/turnout	57,378,380	69.67	
Source: COMELEC

=== SK chairpersons ===
Party	Votes	%	Seats
Nonpartisan	13,204,059	100.00	41,948
Total	13,204,059	100.00	41,948
Total votes	13,204,059	–	
Registered voters/turnout	20,626,220	64.02	
Source: COMELEC

=== SK councilors ===
Party	Votes	%	Seats
Nonpartisan	13,204,059	100.00	293,636
Total	13,204,059	100.00	293,636
Total votes	13,204,059	–	
Registered voters/turnout	20,626,220	64.02	
Source: COMELEC

== Aftermath ==
After election day, the Commission on Elections said that there were no failure of elections for the first time, except for a case in Northern Samar. The Philippine National Police said that 35 people died in the run-up to the election, with election day itself "relatively peaceful". While most leading politicians voted, President Duterte notably didn't, saying he didn't want to disappoint his friends who ran against each other. Several candidates in the "narcolist" still won, while others lost.

Three days after the election, the commission said 100% of the positions have been proclaimed. The DILG asked the commission to hold special elections in 39 barangays where no SK candidates ran. The DILG said that this the most democratic way in determining who gets the positions, as against to appointment of members to the posts. Furthermore, the commission also suspended the 729 candidacies of people who were either overage to run in the SK, or did not satisfy residency requirements; if any of these won, their proclamations would be suspended.

After the winners were determined, the winning barangay and Sangguniang Kabataan chairmen started to vote among themselves on who would be sitting in their respective local legislatures as their representatives. The DILG has released a schedule and guidelines for these series of indirect elections. After nominations and candidacies were made, elections at the municipal and component city level was held on July 16. The winners shall sit in their respective Sangguniang Bayan or Sangguniang Panlungsod. Meanwhile, those who won in the component city and municipal level shall vote among themselves to determine who shall sit among them in their respective Sangguniang Panlalawigan, on July 30. Chairmen from independent component and highly urbanized cities also hold their elections on this date to determine their representatives in their respective Sangguniang Panlungsod.

The sitting representatives in all Sangguniang Panlalawigan, and Sangguniang Panlungsod of independent component and highly urbanized cities shall vote among themselves the officials of the national chapter of the league, including the president on August 29. In the national convention held at the Manila Hotel, Barangay Captain Faustino Dy V of San Fabian, Echague, Isabela was elected national president of the Liga ng mga Barangay unopposed. Dy is the son of Isabela Governor Faustino Dy III.

For deadlocked legislatures, these elections determine on whether the sitting executive will or will not have control of the legislature.

== Marawi elections ==
The barangay elections in Marawi were delayed due to the siege of Marawi, which lasted for five months.

By mid-July, the commission had planned to hold the barangay elections in Marawi in September 2018. The commission was uncertain, though, if the voters had returned to the city. On July 31, the commission decided to hold the elections on September 22.

On Election Day, a brawl and allegations of vote-buying marred the proceedings. Despite this, Col. Romeo Brawner Jr., deputy commander of Joint Task Force Ranao, said that there were no casualties during the day. The commission later said that all winners were proclaimed at least by 6:00 a.m. the following morning.
