= 1905 Uruguayan parliamentary election =

Parliamentary elections were held in Uruguay on 22 January 1905 to elect all members of the Chamber of Representatives and 7 of the 19 members of the Senate. The elections had originally been scheduled for November 1904, but were postponed in the aftermath of the Saravia revolt, which had culminated in the Battle of Masoller in September 1904.

== Electoral system ==
Suffrage was limited to literate men. Voting was not secret, as voters had to sign their ballot papers.

== Results ==
=== Chamber of Representatives ===
Party	Votes	%	Seats	+/–
Colorado Party	27,163	61.33	51	+9
National Party	16,645	37.58	20	–5
People's List	484	1.09	0	New
Total	44,292	100.00	71	+4
Source: Bottinelli et al.

=== Senate ===
Party	Votes	%	Seats
Colorado Party	14,987	59.88	5
National Party	9,750	38.95	2
People's List	292	1.17	0
Total	25,029	100.00	7
Source: Bottinelli et al.
