= Philippine legislative election, 1916 =

Philippine legislative election, 1916 may refer to:

- 1916 Philippine House of Representatives elections
- 1916 Philippine Senate elections
