= 1947 Philippine constitutional plebiscite =

- March 11, 1947
- To vote for the approval of the proposed amendment, the voter shall write the word "Yes" in the blank space after the question; to vote for the rejection thereof, he shall write the word "No".
- Outcome: Proposal approved

Results
| Choice | Votes | % |
|---|---|---|
| Yes | 1,743,981 | 88.52% |
| No | 226,238 | 11.48% |
| Total votes | 1,970,219 | 100.00% |

A plebiscite was held in the Philippines on March 11, 1947, which determined the approval of an amendment to the Constitution of the Philippines, as required by the Bell Trade Act, to provide parity rights between American and Philippine citizens.

The amendment was approved by 1,743,981 votes, with 226,238 votes cast against.

== Results ==
| Choice | Votes | % |
|---|---|---|
| Yes | 1,743,981 | 88.52 |
| Against | 226,238 | 11.48 |
| Total | 1,970,219 | 100.00 |
| Registered voters/turnout | 3,096,683 | – |
Source: Kerkvliet

1947 Philippine constitutional plebiscite results (excluding invalid votes)
| Yes; 1,743,981 (88.5%) |
▲50%

=== By province/city ===
| Province/City | Yes | No | Electorate |
|---|---|---|---|
| Abra | 9,864 | 231 | 12,681 |
| Agusan | 12,360 | 1,294 | 23,156 |
| Albay | 31,876 | 3,185 | 58,900 |
| Antique | 17,555 | 2,643 | 35,611 |
| Bacolod | 7,159 | 439 | 15,610 |
| Baguio | 2,052 | 401 | 5,442 |
| Bataan | 13,403 | 867 | 21,509 |
| Batanes | 1,829 | 41 | 2,841 |
| Batangas | 31,178 | 11,758 | 96,973 |
| Bohol | 55,802 | 8,112 | 88,200 |
| Bukidnon | 3,736 | 308 | 7,602 |
| Bulacan | 33,181 | 17,010 | 91,684 |
| Cagayan | 39,231 | 1,898 | 50,171 |
| Camarines Norte | 7,371 | 1,706 | 18,325 |
| Camarines Sur | 41,583 | 4,770 | 71,176 |
| Capiz | 40,430 | 1,745 | 72,429 |
| Catanduanes | 6,187 | 2,978 | 15,648 |
| Cavite | 40,329 | 1,466 | 53,122 |
| Cavite City | 3,314 | 280 | 8,218 |
| Cebu | 90,058 | 8,046 | 159,029 |
| Cebu City | 13,744 | 1,867 | 30,756 |
| Cotabato | 34,693 | 1,123 | 50,944 |
| Davao | 16,730 | 2,454 | 27,068 |
| Davao City | 7,990 | 1,608 | 18,461 |
| Ilocos Norte | 25,380 | 3,018 | 42,140 |
| Ilocos Sur | 34,505 | 2,223 | 55,991 |
| Iloilo | 91,946 | 5,112 | 137,897 |
| Iloilo City | 12,206 | 978 | 23,086 |
| Isabela | 20,611 | 1,365 | 30,647 |
| La Union | 26,861 | 3,121 | 43,501 |
| Laguna | 19,328 | 9,158 | 59,938 |
| Lanao | 86,142 | 4,518 | 100,837 |
| Leyte | 100,258 | 7,596 | 145,832 |
| Manila | 44,832 | 16,313 | 141,791 |
| Marinduque | 10,224 | 1,134 | 15,371 |
| Masbate | 14,706 | 1,090 | 28,342 |
| Mindoro | 13,557 | 2,034 | 28,057 |
| Misamis Occidental | 17,437 | 4,022 | 34,246 |
| Misamis Oriental | 16,077 | 4,347 | 34,574 |
| Mountain Province | 14,778 | 821 | 24,330 |
| Negros Occidental | 114,477 | 2,695 | 150,062 |
| Negros Oriental | 31,575 | 2,547 | 48,939 |
| Nueva Ecija | 33,833 | 6,439 | 83,635 |
| Nueva Vizcaya | 10,939 | 138 | 13,331 |
| Palawan | 9,305 | 618 | 15,816 |
| Pampanga | 35,375 | 4,103 | 90,778 |
| Pangasinan | 92,011 | 23,531 | 167,633 |
| Quezon | 34,582 | 6,637 | 71,373 |
| Quezon City | 3,293 | 841 | 10,632 |
| Rizal | 38,376 | 18,049 | 106,181 |
| Romblon | 9,299 | 532 | 14,946 |
| Samar | 75,575 | 1,278 | 92,687 |
| San Pablo | 3,480 | 2,454 | 10,904 |
| Sorsogon | 34,648 | 1,185 | 45,205 |
| Sulu | 21,782 | 182 | 27,190 |
| Surigao | 20,623 | 2,781 | 36,577 |
| Tagaytay | 634 | 12 | 752 |
| Tarlac | 22,583 | 3,628 | 48,602 |
| Zambales | 13,908 | 1,017 | 26,476 |
| Zamboanga | 14,571 | 3,407 | 28,962 |
| Zamboanga City | 12,262 | 1,084 | 20,866 |
| Total | 1,743,981 | 226,238 | 3,096,683 |
Source: Kerkvliet
