= 1981 Philippine constitutional plebiscite =

- April 7, 1981

Changing the form of government
| For | 79.53% |
| Against | 20.47% |

Certain prohibitions on elective officials
| For | 78.95% |
| Against | 21.05% |

Allowing natural-born citizens who lost citizenship to own land
| For | 77.55% |
| Against | 22.45% |

A national plebiscite and local plebiscites were held on April 7, 1981 in the Philippines. The plebiscite was set to amend the following revisions made by the Interim Batasang Pambansa, pursuant to Batasang Pambansa Blg. 122:

- Call for the establishment of a modified parliamentary system, amending for this purpose Articles VII, VIII and IX of the Philippine Constitution
- Institute electoral reforms
- Provides that a natural-born citizen of the Philippines who has lost his Philippine citizenship may be a transferee of private land, for use by him as residence

Also were held in certain areas the creation of three municipalities in Bohol, South Cotabato and Zamboanga del Norte:

- For the creation of the new municipality of Bien Unido, Bohol, from certain barangays of Alibon and Trinidad, Bohol
- For the creation of the new municipality of Sto. Niño, South Cotabato from certain barangays of Banga and Norala, South Cotabato
- For the creation of the new municipality of Baliguian, Zamboanga del Norte, from certain Barangays of Siocon, Zamboanga del Norte

== Results ==
The majority of the Filipino people voted "Yes" to the terms and constitutional amendments.

=== On changing the form of government ===
Do you approve of to amend the constitution and establish a modified parliamentary system?
| Choice | Votes | % |
|---|---|---|
| Yes | 13,847,765 | 79.53 |
| No | 3,564,675 | 20.47 |
| Total | 17,412,440 | 100.00 |

Question #1 of the 1981 Philippine constitutional plebiscite results (excluding invalid votes)
| Yes; 13,847,765 (79.5%) | No; 3,564,675 (20.5%) |
▲50%

=== On prohibiting elective officials from being appointed, limiting participation to two largest parties only, and prohibiting party-switching ===
Do you want to prohibit elective officials from being eligible for appointment during their term, except as member of the Executive Committee? Do you want to entitle accreditation to the top two political parties only? Do you want to prohibit public officers from changing political party affiliations during their term?
| Choice | Votes | % |
|---|---|---|
| Yes | 13,774,799 | 78.95 |
| No | 3,672,644 | 21.05 |
| Total | 17,447,443 | 100.00 |

Question #2 of the 1981 Philippine constitutional plebiscite results (excluding invalid votes)
| Yes; 13,774,799 (79%) | No; 3,672,644 (21%) |
▲50%

=== On allowing erstwhile natural-born citizens who lost citizenship to own land ===
Do you want to allow natural-born citizens of the Philippines who have lost their citizenship to own land?
| Choice | Votes | % |
|---|---|---|
| Yes | 13,382,300 | 77.55 |
| No | 3,874,416 | 22.45 |
| Total | 17,256,716 | 100.00 |

Question #3 of the 1981 Philippine constitutional plebiscite results (excluding invalid votes)
| Yes; 13,382,300 (77.5%) | No; 3,874,416 (22.5%) |
▲50%

== See also ==
- Commission on Elections
- Politics of the Philippines
- Philippine elections
- President of the Philippines
