= 1937 Philippine local elections =

1937 Philippine local election
← 1935	December 14, 1937	1941 →

Local elections were held December 14, 1937 in the Philippines. All Philippine women were allowed to vote and elect among them into public offices. One of the famous examples is the election of Carmen Planas as Councilor of the City of Manila.

== See also ==
- Commission on Elections
- Politics of the Philippines
- Philippine elections
- President of the Philippines
