= 1940 Philippine constitutional plebiscites =

- June 18, 1940

On creating a bicameral legislature
For	79.14%
Against	20.86%

On having president and vice president re-elected
For	81.67%
Against	18.33%

On creating a Commission on Elections
For	77.95%
Against	22.05%

Plebiscites were held on June 18, 1940 in the Philippines to ratify the following amendments to the Constitution: the extension of the tenure of the President and the Vice-President to four years with reelection for another term; the establishment of a bicameral Congress of the Philippines, with the Senate as the upper house and the House of Representatives as the lower house; and the creation of an independent Commission on Elections composed of three members to supervise all elections and plebiscites.

== Results ==
=== On creating a bicameral legislature ===
Are you in favor of creating a bicameral Congress composed of the Senate and the House of Representatives?
Choice	Votes	%
For	1,043,712	79.14
Against	275,184	20.86
Total	1,318,896	100.00

Question #1 of the 1940 Philippine constitutional plebiscites results (excluding invalid votes)
Yes; 1,043,712 (79.1%)	No; 275,184 (20.9%)
▲50%

==== By province/city ====
Province/City	Yes	No
Abra	10,469	389
Agusan	7,898	3,187
Albay	17,154	8,431
Antique	10,867	2,643
Bacolod	5,490	829
Baguio	4,478	324
Bataan	5,870	2,790
Batanes	1,889	125
Batangas	24,586	6,163
Bohol	29,539	7,283
Bukidnon	2,386	1,983
Bulacan	23,663	10,801
Cagayan	13,098	4,620
Camarines Norte	5,252	2,302
Camarines Sur	21,860	4,709
Capiz	18,383	3,224
Cavite	4,992	5,042
Cavite City	809	967
Cebu	35,875	19,220
Cebu City	4,859	7,135
Cotabato	10,088	3,613
Davao	4,934	4,146
Davao City	1,664	2,892
Ilocos Norte	13,339	8,129
Ilocos Sur	14,041	5,370
Iloilo	57,108	5,360
Iloilo City	4,147	1,667
Isabela	20,868	2,349
La Union	12,741	3,857
Laguna	40,250	4,420
Lanao	46,743	2,338
Leyte	53,545	17,017
Manila	25,667	12,059
Marinduque	2,638	3,558
Masbate	9,956	1,211
Mindoro	9,823	1,247
Misamis Occidental	11,310	2,844
Misamis Oriental	7,789	7,877
Mountain Province	7,110	2,268
Negros Occidental	108,235	6,555
Negros Oriental	17,471	3,722
Nueva Ecija	28,437	8,784
Nueva Vizcaya	2,349	1,451
Palawan	3,270	1,992
Pampanga	18,984	6,388
Pangasinan	45,319	13,076
Quezon City	2,109	239
Rizal	39,137	9,721
Romblon	3,646	1,528
Samar	44,447	6,231
San Pablo	9,656	14
Sorsogon	30,557	2,422
Sulu	10,372	788
Surigao	7,060	8,124
Tagaytay	365	2
Tarlac	11,542	6,311
Tayabas	32,928	7,444
Zambales	11,938	1,444
Zamboanga	6,951	3,065
Zamboanga City	5,761	1,494
Total	1,043,712	275,184

=== On having president and vice president re-elected ===
Are you in favor of allowing the president and vice president to serve for four years, with re-election of one term?
Choice	Votes	%
For	1,072,039	81.67
Against	240,632	18.33
Total	1,312,671	100.00

Question #2 of the 1940 Philippine constitutional plebiscites results (excluding invalid votes)
Yes; 1,072,039 (81.7%)
▲50%

==== By province/city ====
Province/City	Yes	No
Abra	10,494	353
Agusan	7,899	2,956
Albay	18,505	7,020
Antique	11,295	2,204
Bacolod	5,530	799
Baguio	4,539	261
Bataan	6,214	2,399
Batanes	1,647	104
Batangas	25,812	4,902
Bohol	30,017	7,187
Bukidnon	2,563	1,840
Bulacan	24,794	9,574
Cagayan	13,838	3,854
Camarines Norte	5,695	1,825
Camarines Sur	22,607	3,771
Capiz	18,962	2,782
Cavite	5,776	4,296
Cavite City	908	852
Cebu	37,971	18,653
Cebu City	5,119	6,881
Cotabato	10,608	2,928
Davao	5,492	3,540
Davao City	1,839	2,703
Ilocos Norte	14,163	7,252
Ilocos Sur	14,158	4,606
Iloilo	57,405	4,698
Iloilo City	4,164	1,553
Isabela	20,860	1,922
La Union	13,284	3,273
Laguna	39,523	3,819
Lanao	46,992	1,831
Leyte	53,736	16,219
Manila	27,621	9,731
Marinduque	3,415	2,806
Masbate	10,075	1,043
Mindoro	10,221	834
Misamis Occidental	11,328	2,740
Misamis Oriental	7,987	7,644
Mountain Province	7,765	1,625
Negros Occidental	108,332	5,972
Negros Oriental	17,738	3,357
Nueva Ecija	29,453	7,595
Nueva Vizcaya	2,499	1,291
Palawan	3,666	1,575
Pampanga	19,910	5,329
Pangasinan	47,322	10,652
Quezon City	2,139	198
Rizal	40,797	7,805
Romblon	3,878	1,246
Samar	45,234	5,646
San Pablo	9,648	23
Sorsogon	30,942	2,031
Sulu	10,443	709
Surigao	8,310	6,821
Tagaytay	367	0
Tarlac	12,219	5,518
Tayabas	32,887	6,439
Zambales	12,223	1,142
Zamboanga	7,465	2,520
Zamboanga City	5,746	1,483
Total	1,072,039	240,632

=== On creating a Commission on Elections ===
Are you in favor of creating a Commission on Elections?
Choice	Votes	%
For	1,017,606	77.95
Against	287,923	22.05
Total	1,305,529	100.00

Question #3 of the 1940 Philippine constitutional plebiscites results (excluding invalid votes)
Yes; 1,017,606 (77.9%)	No; 287,923 (22.1%)
▲50%

==== By province/city ====
Province/City	Yes	No
Abra	10,486	365
Agusan	5,276	5,361
Albay	17,623	7,999
Antique	11,051	2,428
Bacolod	5,531	780
Baguio	4,535	260
Bataan	5,499	3,060
Batanes	1,857	130
Batangas	24,334	6,292
Bohol	28,849	7,874
Bukidnon	2,367	1,986
Bulacan	23,122	11,125
Cagayan	13,210	4,341
Camarines Norte	5,402	1,998
Camarines Sur	21,651	5,432
Capiz	18,905	2,903
Cavite	5,062	4,878
Cavite City	822	910
Cebu	37,574	18,785
Cebu City	4,843	7,096
Cotabato	10,412	3,209
Davao	5,095	3,872
Davao City	1,711	2,787
Ilocos Norte	13,312	8,001
Ilocos Sur	14,104	5,052
Iloilo	57,234	4,872
Iloilo City	4,164	1,647
Isabela	20,253	2,479
La Union	12,344	3,795
Laguna	35,257	7,978
Lanao	45,401	3,585
Leyte	45,054	23,314
Manila	25,476	11,567
Marinduque	2,213	3,897
Masbate	9,859	1,195
Mindoro	9,866	1,146
Misamis Occidental	11,074	2,979
Misamis Oriental	7,543	7,256
Mountain Province	6,476	1,947
Negros Occidental	107,213	7,231
Negros Oriental	17,504	3,548
Nueva Ecija	28,624	8,476
Nueva Vizcaya	1,376	2,399
Palawan	3,274	1,923
Pampanga	18,588	6,419
Pangasinan	45,570	12,330
Quezon City	2,090	253
Rizal	38,397	9,938
Romblon	3,591	1,506
Samar	44,268	6,262
San Pablo	7,543	1,750
Sorsogon	30,187	2,558
Sulu	10,440	703
Surigao	7,182	7,927
Tagaytay	367	0
Tarlac	11,672	5,954
Tayabas	31,349	7,808
Zambales	11,767	1,258
Zamboanga	4,919	2,180
Zamboanga City	6,838	2,919
Total	1,017,606	287,923

== See also ==
- Commission on Elections
- Politics of the Philippines
- Philippine elections
