= 1975 Philippine executive and legislative powers referendum =

A national referendum was called for February 27–28, 1975 where the majority of the barangays voted approved the following:

- The use by the President of his power to restructure the local governments in Greater Manila into an integrated system like a manager- commission for under such terms and conditions as he may decide,
- The appointment by the President of the successors of local elective officials (outside the Greater Manila) whose terms of office expired on December 31, 1975, and
- The manner in which the President has been exercising his powers under Martial Law and the Constitution and that the President should continue exercising the same powers.
- Referendum allowing Martial law to continue, not to convene the Interim National Assembly and extend the terms of local officials by appointment, and suspend elections, pursuant to Presidential Decrees Nos. 1366, 1366-A and 1366-B.

== Results ==
=== For Greater Manila ===
==== On local governments and officials ====
1. Do you want the present Mayor-Council form of government now existing in the cities and municipalities of Greater Manila to continue?

2. If you do not want the Mayor-Council type to continue, do you favor the President exercising his powers to restructure the local governments in Greater Manila (four cities and 13 municipalities) into an integrated system like a Manager or Commission form under such terms and conditions as he may decide?

Choice	Votes	%
Integrated system (Manager-Commission)	1,995,619	60.83
Mayor-Council	948,323	28.91
Abstentions	336,794	10.27
Total	3,280,736	100.00
Source: U.S. House of Representatives

==== On martial law ====
1. Do you approve of the manner President Marcos has been exercising his powers under Martial Law and the Constitution, including the power to issue proclamations, orders, decrees and instructions with the force of law?

Choice	Votes	%
Yes	2,812,928	85.79
No	378,524	11.54
Abstentions	87,420	2.67
Total	3,278,872	100.00
Source: U.S. House of Representatives

2. Do you want the President to continue exercising the same power?

Choice	Votes	%
Yes	2,721,957	84.43
No	406,141	12.60
Abstentions	96,000	2.98
Total	3,224,098	100.00
Source: U.S. House of Representatives

=== For areas outside of Greater Manila ===
==== On local officials ====
At the expiration of the terms of office of your local elective officials on December 31, 1975, how do you want their successors chosen: to be appointed by the President or elected in accordance with the Election Code?

Choice	Votes	%
Appointment	15,321,779	77.45
Election	3,278,058	16.57
Abstentions	1,183,183	5.98
Total	19,783,020	100.00
Source: U.S. House of Representatives

==== On martial law ====
1. Do you approve of the manner President Marcos has been exercising his powers under Martial Law and the Constitution, including the power to issue proclamations, orders, decrees and instructions with the force of law?

Choice	Votes	%
Yes	17,675,437	89.17
No	1,791,983	9.04
Abstentions	354,232	1.79
Total	19,821,652	100.00
Source: U.S. House of Representatives

2. Do you want the President to continue exercising the same power?

Choice	Votes	%
Yes	17,198,028	88.02
No	1,875,426	9.60
Abstentions	466,047	2.39
Total	19,539,501	100.00
Source: U.S. House of Representatives

== See also ==
- Commission on Elections
- Politics of the Philippines
- Philippine elections
