= Michael Henry Yusingco =

Filipino lawyer

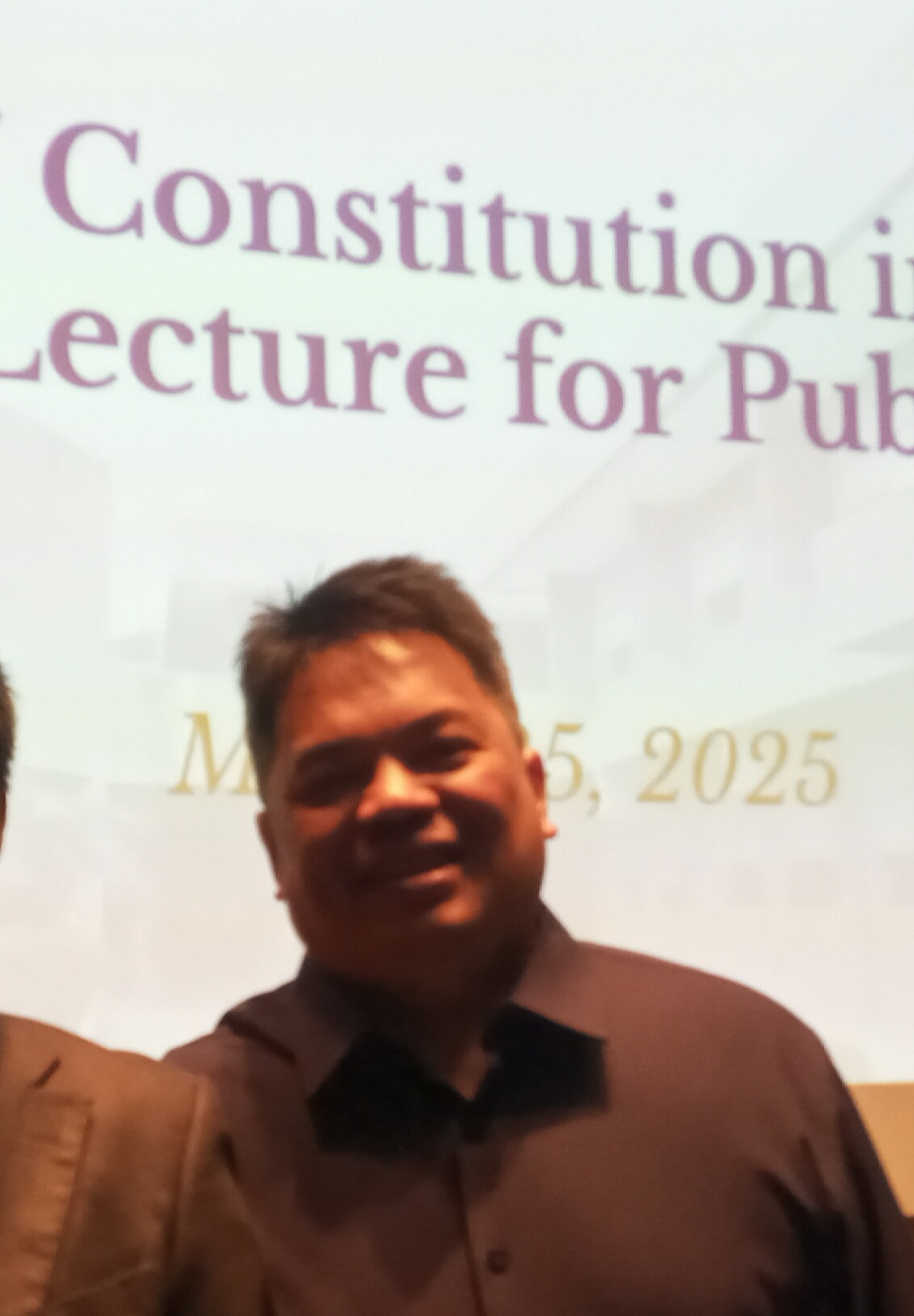
- Yusingco in 2025
- Born: April 28, 1973 (age 53)
- Occupations: Lawyer; Law professor Political scientist Constitutional law expert
- Known for: Constitutional law expertise Research on federalism Political analysis Legal education

Academic background
- Education: Ateneo de Manila University (AB); Arellano University (LLB); University of Melbourne (MLaw&Dev)

Academic work
- Discipline: Law Constitutional studies Political science Public policy
- Sub-discipline: Constitutional law Federalism; Local governance Political reforms
- Notable works: Studies on Philippine constitutional reform; Research on federalism and decentralization Analysis of local governance

Michael Henry Yusingco is a Filipino lawyer and academic professional. His constitutional reform analyses and political insights are frequently heard in broadcast media interviews. He writes papers and policy briefs on issues related to charter change, decentralization, and federalism as a research fellow in various institutions, including the Institute for Autonomy and Governance and the Ateneo Policy Center.

He has served as a consultant to the Office of Senator Koko Pimentel for a year and has written op-ed articles for various newspapers and news sites.

== Education ==
Yusingco graduated with a bachelor's degree in philosophy from Ateneo de Manila University in 1995 and obtained his law degree from Arellano University School of Law in 2002, successfully passing the bar examinations the following year. In 2014, he earned a Master of Law and Development degree from the University of Melbourne Law School.

== Major publications ==
=== Books ===
- Rethinking the Bangsamoro Perspective [Ateneo de Davao University and Al Qalam Research Institute for Islamic Identity and Dialogue in Southeast Asia, November 2013].
- Engaging the Bangsamoro Autonomous Region: A Handbook for Civil Society Organizations [Institute for Autonomy and Governance, July 2020].

=== Book chapters ===
- "Imperial Manila" and local autonomy. In Building Inclusive Democracies in ASEAN, 2018, pp. 346–355.

=== Journal articles ===
- A Philippine Strongman's Legislative and Constitutional Reforms Legacy. Yusingco, M.H.L., Mendoza, R.U., Mendoza, G.A.S., Yap, J. In Journal of Current Southeast Asian Affairs, 2023, 42(1), pp. 63–89.
- Term limits and political dynasties in the Philippines: Unpacking the links. Mendoza, R.U., Banaag, M.S., Hiwatig, J.D., Yusingco, M.H.L., Yap, J.K. In Asia-Pacific Social Science Review, 2020, 20(4), pp. 88–99.
