= 2028 Philippine vice presidential election =

16th election of the Philippine vice president

- May 8, 2028
Incumbent Vice President
Sara Duterte
Hugpong

Vice presidential elections are scheduled to be held in the Philippines on May 8, 2028, as part of a general election that will also determine the control of the Congress of the Philippines and numerous local positions in the country. This will be the 16th vice presidential election in the country since 1935, and will be the seventh sextennial presidential and vice presidential election since 1992.

Incumbent vice president Sara Duterte is eligible for re-election to a second term under the Constitution of the Philippines but has decided to run for president instead. Therefore, this election will determine the 16th vice president. The president and vice president are elected separately, thus, the two winning candidates may come from different political parties.

== Background ==
In the 2022 Philippine presidential and vice presidential elections, the UniTeam ticket of former Senator Bongbong Marcos of the Partido Federal ng Pilipinas (PFP) and Davao City mayor Sara Duterte of Lakas won, running on a platform that promised broad continuity of incumbent president Rodrigo Duterte's programs and policies.

The tandem had a falling out that led to Duterte from resigning from the cabinet and from Lakas in June 2024. Duterte and Marcos endorsed opposing senatorial slates in 2025, and Marcos allies in the House of Representatives impeached Duterte while campaigning was ongoing. The Supreme Court ruled Duterte's impeachment as unconstitutional.

Duterte announced on February 18, 2026 that she is running for the presidency in 2028. In 2026, Marcos allies in the House are attempting to impeach Duterte again.

Sara Duterte, the incumbent vice president whose term will expire at noon on June 30, 2028.

== Electoral system ==
Vice presidential elections in the Philippines are held every six years, after 1992, on the second Monday of May. Elections to the vice presidency use the first-past-the-post voting to determine the winner, with the candidate with the highest number of votes, whether or not one has a majority, winning the contested position. The elections with the presidency are held in parallel and voters may split their ticket. If two or more candidates are tied for either position, Congress shall vote from among them which shall be the vice president, as the case may be.

The winner will serve a six-year term commencing at noon on June 30, 2028, and ending on the same day, six years later.

=== Eligibility ===
The Constitution of the Philippines limits the occupancy of the vice presidency to natural-born citizens aged 40 on the day of the election who are registered to vote, who have been a resident of the Philippines for at least ten years immediately preceding such election, and are able to read and write. The incumbent vice president may seek reelection for a second consecutive term.

== Candidates ==
=== Publicly expressed interest ===
The following individuals have expressed running for vice president but has no final decision yet.

Individuals who have expressed an interest in running for the vice presidential election (Note: Individuals listed below have, as of May 2026, personally expressed an interest in seeking the 2028 vice presidential election in at least two reliable media sources in the last six months.)
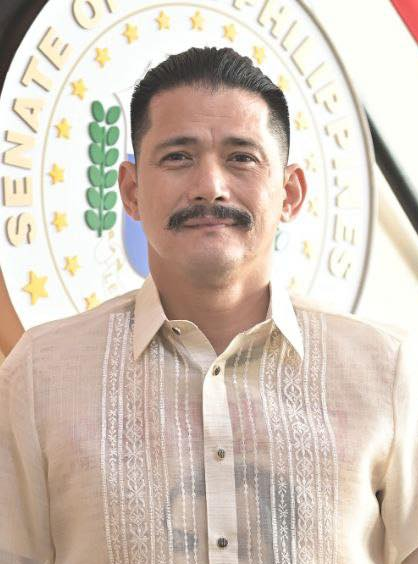
Senator
Robin Padilla
(2022–present)

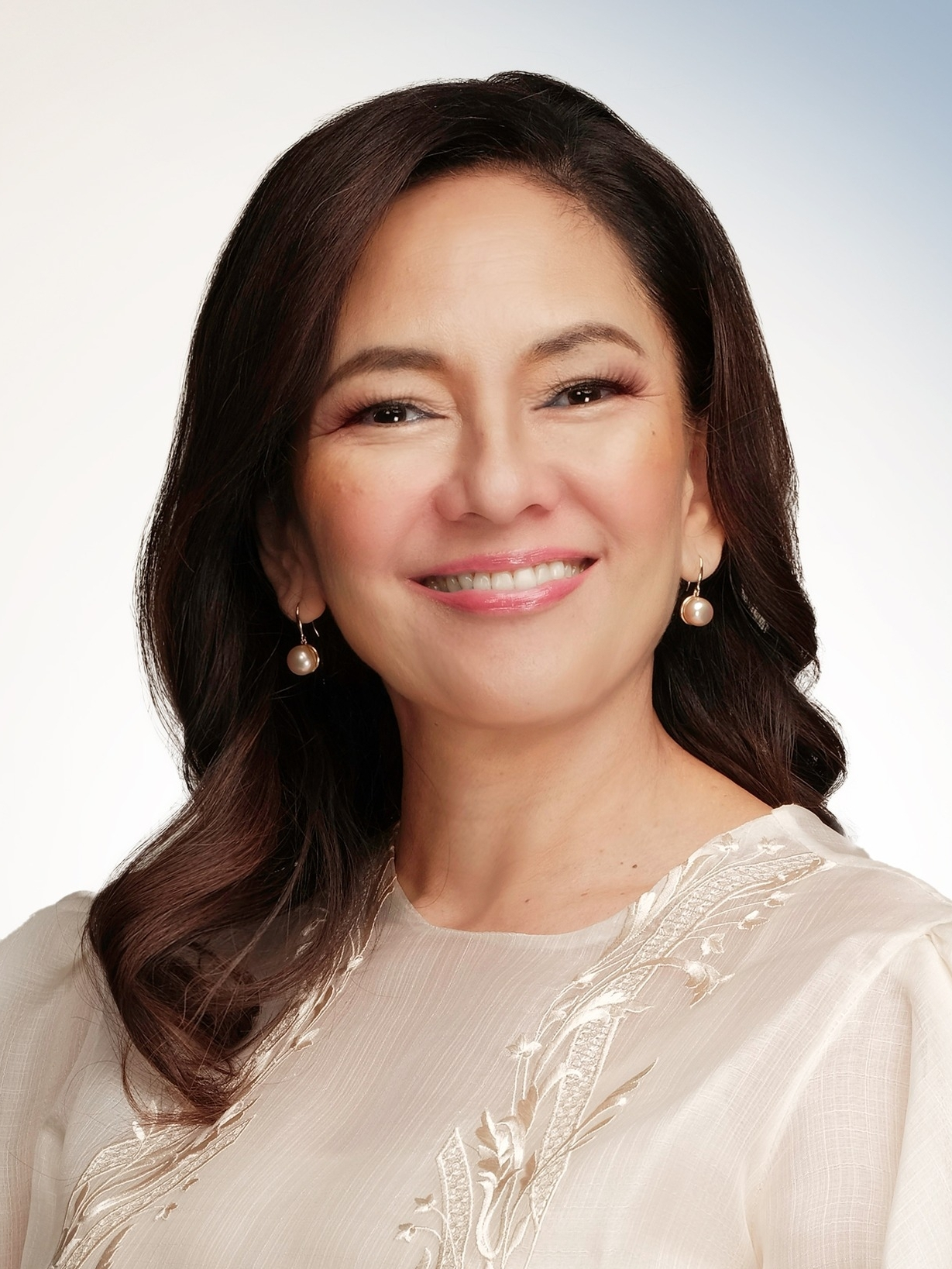
Senator
Risa Hontiveros
(2016–present)

==== Robin Padilla ====
Robin Padilla has served as Senator of the Philippines since 2022 after being the topnotcher of the 2022 senate election. Padilla has stated his openness to a vice presidential bid alongside Sara Duterte, if asked by former president Duterte. Earlier, Padilla's wife, Mariel Rodriguez said that Padilla won't run for another elected position in 2028 due to frustration toward the slow pace of government. He has also endorsed Imee Marcos as Duterte's running mate.

==== Risa Hontiveros ====
Risa Hontiveros has served as the Senator of the Philippines since 2016, despite saying that she is ready and seriously considering a presidential run in 2028. Hontiveros is also open to running for vice president if chose by the liberal opposition. She is also seen as the potential running mate of former vice president Leni Robredo and senator Bam Aquino.

=== Speculated by the media ===
Individuals below have been mentioned in media discussions as possible vice presidential candidates but have not publicly expressed interest in running.

Speculated by the media (Note: Individuals listed below have, as of May 2026, been mentioned as potential 2028 vice presidential candidates in at least two reliable media sources in the last six months.)
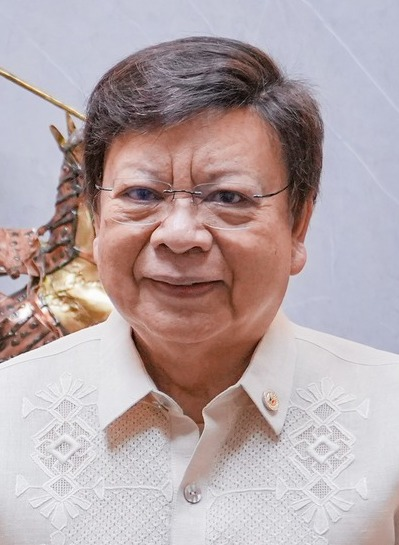
Senator
Rodante Marcoleta
(2025–present)

==== Rodante Marcoleta ====
Rodante Marcoleta has served as the Senator of the Philippines since 2025. Hugpong Secretary-General and Former Davao del Norte Governor Anthony del Rosario identified Marcoleta as a potential running mate for Sara Duterte given his loyalty to the Dutertes and legal experience. Partido Reporma also endorsed Duterte and Marcoleta in 2026 saying Marcoleta "brings independence of judgment, clarity of principle, and legislative experience rooted in constitutional accountability." Marcoleta declined to comment if he was Sara Duterte's running mate.

=== Declined to run for vice president ===
The following individuals have been mentioned as potential candidates for vice president but have publicly declined to run for the position.

- Bam Aquino (KANP), incumbent senator of the Philippines (2013–2019, 2025–present)
  - On February 19, 2026, when reacting to speculations of him running for vice president, he simply said "I will not run for Vice President in 2028".
- Benjamin Magalong (NPC), incumbent Mayor of Baguio (2019–present)
  - Magalong plans to retire and won't run for any public office in 2028, this came after he saw lawyer Raul Lambino proposing a "Duterte-Magalong 2028" tandem in which Magalong thought was a joke.
- Imee Marcos (Nacionalista), incumbent senator of the Philippines (2019–present)
  - Marcos has stated that she will not seek any higher office in 2028 and will complete her term as a senator until being term-limited in 2031.

== Opinion polling ==
Social research institutions in the Philippines, including Social Weather Stations (SWS), Pulse Asia, OCTA Research, have conducted surveys for the 2028 Philippine vice presidential election as early as 2025. In each poll, bold indicates the leading candidate whereas italics indicate runner(s)-up within the margin of error.

=== Before the filing of candidacy ===
Fieldwork date(s)	Pollster	Sample size	MoE	Abalos PFP	Angara LDP	Aquino KANP	A. Cayetano Ind.	P. Cayetano Nacionalista	dela Rosa PDP	Dizon (Note: Declined to run) Ind.	R. Duterte PDP	Sa. Duterte HNP	Se. Duterte PDP	Escudero NPC	Garcia Ind.	Gatchalian NPC	Go PDP	Hontiveros Akbayan	Magalong NPC	Marcoleta Ind.	B. Marcos PFP	I. Marcos Nacionalista	Moreno Aksyon	Pacquiao PFP	Padilla PDP	Pangilinan Liberal	Poe Ind.	Robredo Liberal	Romualdez Lakas	T. Sotto NPC	V. Sotto Ind.	Teodoro PRP	Torre Ind.	Trillanes Aksyon	E. Tulfo Lakas	R. Tulfo Ind.	Villar Nacionalista	Zubiri Ind.	Others	Und./ None	Ref.	Lead
June 28–July 3 & 6, 2026	Pulse Asia	2,400	±2.0%	—	—	14	0.01	0.1	0.1	0.02	—	—	—	—	—	0.01	**27**	—	—	1	—	—	0.01	—	21	4	14	0.02	—	0.2	0.04	—	0.5	0.01	9	0.02	—	—	—	8	1	Go +6
March 10–17, 2026	WR Numero	1,455	±3.0%	—	0.5	1.9	—	—	—	0.6	—	—	—	5	—	0.7	**12.2**	5.9	0.4	8.4	3.6	1.9	3.5	—	11.7	5	11.9	—	—	—	—	—	0.0	—	—	—	—	—	—	**26.8**	—	Go +0.3
February 19–20, 2026	Tangere	1,200	±2.77%	—	—	21	—	—	—	—	—	—	—	—	—	—	**27**	—	—	—	—	—	—	—	10	—	—	—	—	—	—	—	—	—	—	13	—	—	4	15	—	Go +6
November 21–28, 2025	WR Numero	1,412	±3.0%	—	0.3	7.2	—	—	—	0.2	—	—	—	2.6	—	1.2	**19.1**	2.8	1.7	—	—	4.3	6.8	—	8.5	5	8.4	—	—	—	—	—	—	—	—	—	1.2	—	—	**30.6**	—	Go +10.6
July 29 – August 6, 2025	WR Numero	1,418	—	—	—	14.9	—	—	—	—	—	—	—	5.9	—	0.4	**16.2**	4.3	—	—	—	4.5	—	1.8	7.7	—	6.8	—	1.4	—	—	—	—	—	—	8.4	—	—	0.3	5.5	—	Go +1.3
June 20—22, 2025	Tangere	2,000	±2.15%	—	—	22	—	—	—	—	—	—	—	4	—	—	**38**	5	—	—	—	4	—	—	3	—	—	—	—	—	—	—	—	—	4	9	—	—	3	8	—	Go +16
May 20—21, 2025	Tangere	1,800	±2.48%	—	—	26	—	—	—	—	—	—	—	4	—	—	**36**	6	—	—	—	—	—	—	3	—	—	—	—	—	—	—	—	—	4	11	—	—	4	6	—	Go +10
March 31 – April 7, 2025	WR Numero	—	—	—	—	—	—	—	—	—	—	—	—	—	—	—	—	—	—	—	—	7.4	—	5.2	8.4	—	**18.4**	16.1	1.4	—	—	1.6	—	—	—	—	—	3	7.7	**30.7**	—	None +12.3
February 20—26, 2025	Pulse Asia	—	—	—	—	—	—	—	—	—	—	—	—	—	—	—	—	—	—	—	—	—	—	—	—	—	**47**	—	—	—	—	—	—	—	—	—	—	—	—	—	—	Poe +47
February 10—18, 2025	WR Numero	1,814	±2.0%	—	—	—	—	—	—	—	—	—	—	—	—	—	—	—	—	—	—	7.0	—	9.7	8.3	—	**15.6**	13.5	1.1	—	—	2.8	—	—	—	—	—	3.3	6.2	**33**	—	None +17.4
September 5—23, 2024	WR Numero	1,729	—	—	—	—	—	—	—	—	—	—	—	—	—	—	—	—	—	—	—	8	—	8	9	—	**20**	14	3	—	—	3	—	—	—	—	—	4	—	—	—	Poe +6
June 25—30, 2024	Oculum	1,200	±3.0%	—	—	—	—	—	—	—	16	—	—	—	—	—	5	6	—	—	—	4	6	4	4	—	—	7	1	—	—	—	—	—	—	**20**	—	—	—	**22**	—	None +2
May 23—26, 2024	Tangere		±2.5%	2.33	—	—	—	—	—	—	11.80	0.01	0.87	11.27	1.40	—	9.60	7.80	—	—	—	5.67	—	4.00	3.13	2.27	13.93	—	—	—	—	2.13	—	—	—	**17.80**	—	2.13	3.87	—	—	R. Tulfo +3.87
March 6—10, 2024	Pulse Asia	—	—	—	—	—	—	—	—	—	0.001	0.01	0.004	—	—	—	0.3	0.05	—	—	—	16	—	14	14	0.02	**35**	—	1	—	—	4	—	—	—	0.5	—	7	—	6	2	Poe +19
November 24 – December 24, 2023	WR Numero	1,457	—	—	—	—	—	—	—	—	—	—	—	—	—	—	—	—	—	—	—	15	—	11	11	—	**22**	9	2	—	—	4	—	—	—	—	—	6	—	21	—	Poe +1
