= Philippine legislative election, 1934 =

Philippine legislative election, 1934 may refer to:

- 1934 Philippine House of Representatives elections
- 1934 Philippine Senate elections
