= Philippine legislative election, 1931 =

Philippine legislative election, 1931 may refer to:

- 1931 Philippine House of Representatives elections
- 1931 Philippine Senate elections
