= 1967 Philippine constitutional plebiscite =

- November 14, 1967
- Are you in favor of increasing the number of congressmen from 120 to 180?
- Outcome: Proposal rejected

Results
Choice	Votes	%
Yes	737,997	18.28%
No	3,299,485	81.72%
Total votes	4,037,482	100.00%
Registered voters/turnout	9,744,604	41.43%
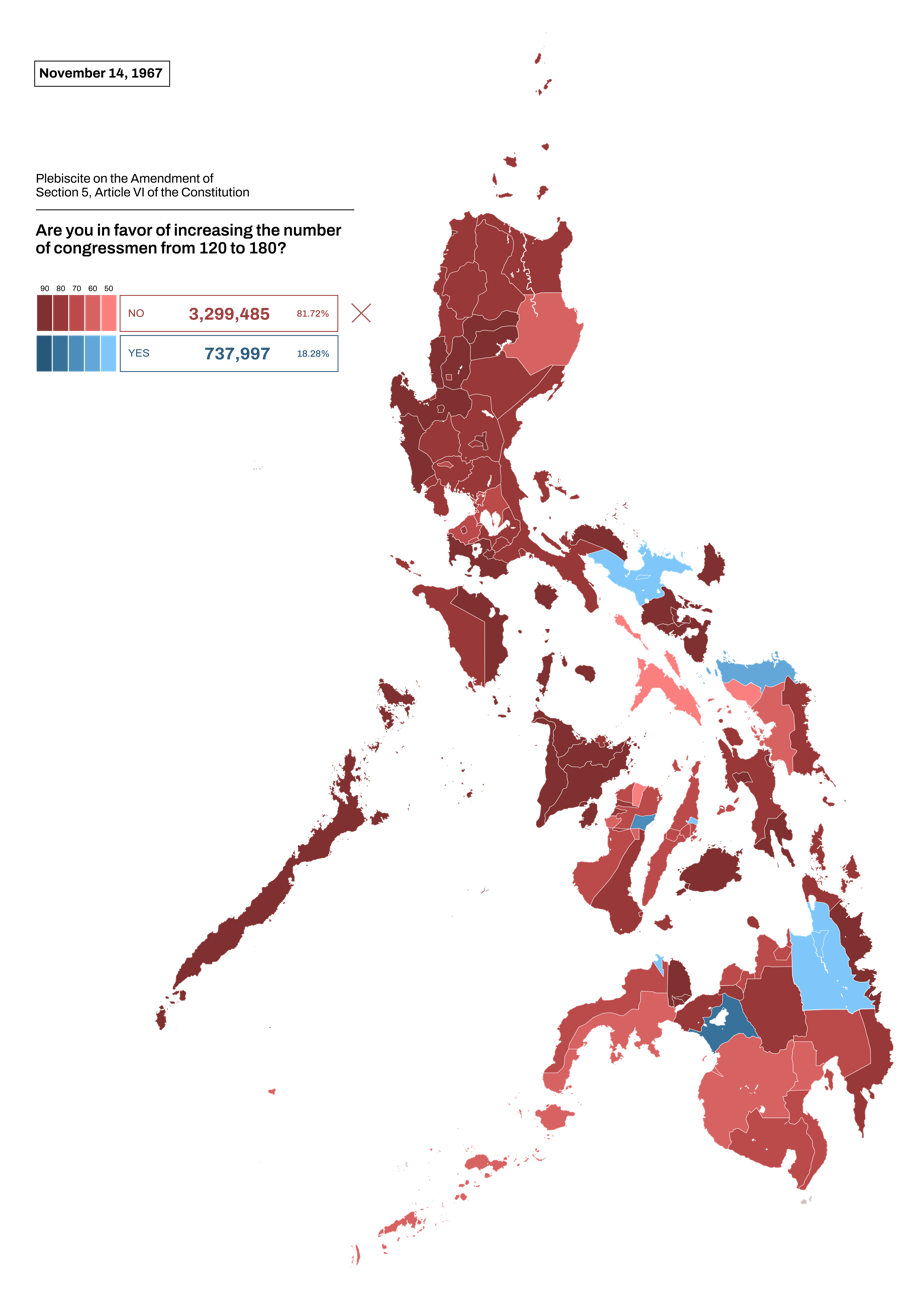
- Results by province and city
Yes: 50–60% 60–70% 70–80%	80–90% 90-100%	No: 50–60% 60–70% 70–80%	80–90% 90-100%

- Are you in favor of allowing members of Congress to serve in the coming Constitutional Convention without forfeiting their seats?
- Outcome: Proposal rejected

Results
Choice	Votes	%
Yes	652,127	16.56%
No	3,286,879	83.44%
Total votes	3,939,006	100.00%
Registered voters/turnout	9,744,604	40.42%
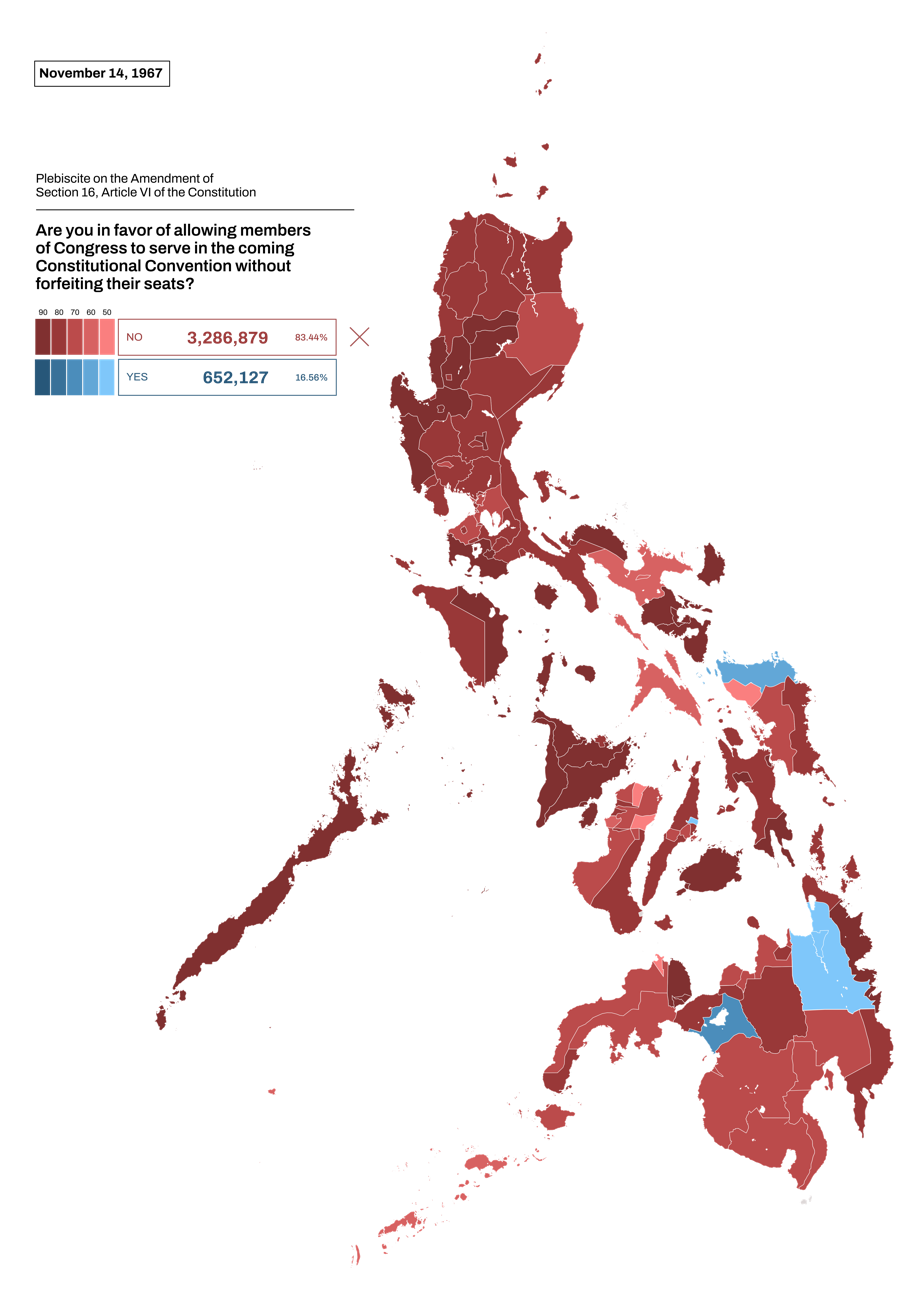
- Results by province and city
Yes: 50–60% 60–70% 70–80%	80–90% 90-100%	No: 50–60% 60–70% 70–80%	80–90% 90-100%

A constitutional referendum was held in the Philippines on 14 November 1967. On 16 March 1967 Congress decided that a Constitutional Convention would be elected in 1971. In preparation for the election, two amendments to the constitution were proposed beforehand. Voters were asked whether they approved of two amendments to the Constitution of the Philippines; one to increase the number of members of the House of Representatives from 120 to 180, and one to allow members of Congress to be elected to Constitutional Conventions without giving up their Congress seats. A petition seeking to stop the referendum was filed before the Supreme Court, but was dismissed five days before the referendum. Both proposals were rejected by voters.

A Constitutional Convention was subsequently elected on 10 November 1970, and began work on a new constitution on 6 January 1971. A draft was published on 29 November 1972 and put to a referendum on 15 January 1973.

== Results ==
=== On enlarging the House of Representatives ===
Are you in favor of increasing the number of congressmen from 120 to 180?
Choice	Votes	%
For	737,997	18.28
Against	3,299,485	81.72
Total	4,037,482	100.00

Question #1 of the 1967 Philippine constitutional plebiscites results (excluding invalid votes)
No; 3,299,485 (81.7%)
▲50%

==== By province/city ====
Province/City	Yes	No	Total
Abra	2,216	11,827	14,043
Agusan	22,055	14,837	36,892
Aklan	1,971	30,614	32,585
Albay	3,278	59,917	63,195
Angeles	2,500	7,035	9,535
Antique	992	37,789	38,781
Bacolod	3,674	16,883	20,557
Bago	2,123	4,199	6,322
Baguio	1,931	10,387	12,318
Basilan	2,196	4,667	6,863
Bataan	3,170	23,892	27,062
Batanes	262	1,770	2,032
Batangas	6,554	102,670	109,224
Benguet	1,150	17,049	18,199
Bohol	5,781	82,490	88,271
Bukidnon	4,281	20,984	25,265
Bulacan	13,246	110,733	123,979
Butuan	11,495	8,935	20,430
Cabanatuan	2,111	9,248	11,359
Cadiz	1,794	2,326	4,120
Cagayan	7,818	44,940	52,758
Cagayan de Oro	4,295	12,154	16,449
Calbayog	3,522	4,662	8,184
Caloocan	7,952	21,090	29,042
Camarines Norte	1,770	31,800	33,570
Camarines Sur	48,267	39,207	87,474
Camiguin	1,315	5,408	6,723
Canlaon	347	762	1,109
Capiz	2,014	28,574	30,588
Catanduanes	713	17,420	18,133
Cavite	9,842	34,465	44,307
Cavite City	1,812	6,541	8,353
Cebu	22,577	84,496	107,073
Cebu City	10,022	36,159	46,181
Cotabato	20,554	47,676	68,230
Cotabato City	1,547	3,522	5,069
Dagupan	1,660	12,538	14,198
Danao	2,962	2,194	5,156
Dapitan	2,488	2,078	4,566
Davao City	9,294	20,950	30,244
Davao del Norte	8,051	28,002	36,053
Davao del Sur	8,003	20,479	28,482
Davao Oriental	4,068	17,492	21,560
Dumaguete	811	6,459	7,270
Eastern Samar	3,930	26,285	30,215
Gingoog	1,151	4,501	5,652
Ifugao	431	4,176	4,607
Iligan	1,920	9,404	11,324
Ilocos Norte	5,892	39,058	44,950
Ilocos Sur	8,043	41,997	50,040
Iloilo	5,998	119,947	125,945
Iloilo City	2,838	30,694	33,532
Isabela	21,719	39,028	60,747
Kalinga-Apayao	1,739	8,713	10,452
La Carlota	1,013	4,109	5,122
La Union	4,319	55,561	59,880
Laguna	10,315	64,833	75,148
Lanao del Norte	4,978	21,802	26,780
Lanao del Sur	36,567	8,844	45,411
Laoag	991	11,350	12,341
Lapu-Lapu	1,440	4,360	5,800
Legazpi	854	10,716	11,570
Leyte	10,912	85,738	96,650
Lipa	1,100	10,843	11,943
Lucena	1,386	7,525	8,911
Manila	29,438	172,177	201,615
Marawi	6,625	852	7,477
Marinduque	826	17,031	17,857
Masbate	14,751	17,527	32,278
Misamis Occidental	2,137	31,725	33,862
Misamis Oriental	6,162	21,596	27,758
Mountain Province	748	8,391	9,139
Naga	4,646	4,339	8,985
Negros Occidental	21,502	54,106	75,608
Negros Oriental	7,063	38,707	45,770
Northern Samar	20,566	9,458	30,024
Nueva Ecija	11,900	84,145	96,045
Nueva Vizcaya	3,176	24,868	28,044
Occidental Mindoro	1,725	15,188	16,913
Olongapo	1,395	7,681	9,076
Oriental Mindoro	2,783	34,428	37,211
Ormoc	615	8,347	8,962
Ozamiz	513	10,964	11,477
Palawan	2,061	21,203	23,264
Palayan	22	287	309
Pampanga	10,619	64,538	75,157
Pangasinan	16,962	188,703	205,665
Pasay	5,413	22,704	28,117
Quezon	17,420	94,456	111,876
Quezon City	15,096	51,195	66,291
Rizal	39,342	142,374	181,716
Romblon	1,013	20,270	21,283
Roxas	630	5,281	5,911
San Carlos, Negros Occidental	5,181	1,447	6,628
San Carlos, Pangasinan	631	13,434	14,065
San Pablo	2,786	11,779	14,565
Silay	863	4,525	5,388
Sorsogon	2,708	51,233	53,941
South Cotabato	9,528	29,120	38,648
Southern Leyte	2,389	29,883	32,272
Sulu	10,588	17,924	28,512
Surigao del Norte	3,463	28,307	31,770
Surigao del Sur	2,926	26,944	29,870
Tacloban	1,010	9,493	10,503
Tagaytay	226	814	1,040
Tagbilaran	282	5,095	5,377
Tangub	132	3,337	3,469
Tarlac	7,972	62,361	70,333
Toledo	1,146	3,093	4,239
Trece Martires	37	249	286
Western Samar	8,563	18,050	26,613
Zambales	3,003	31,659	34,662
Zamboanga City	4,421	7,817	12,238
Zamboanga del Norte	7,873	20,538	28,411
Zamboanga del Sur	15,100	33,038	48,138
Total	737,997	3,299,485	4,037,482
Source: Congress

=== On Congress members becoming Constitutional Convention delegates ===
Are you in favor of allowing members of Congress to serve in the coming Constitutional Convention without forfeiting their seats?
Choice	Votes	%
For	652,127	16.56
Against	3,286,879	83.44
Total	3,939,006	100.00

Question #2 of the 1967 Philippine constitutional plebiscites results (excluding invalid votes)
No; 3,286,879 (83.4%)
▲50%

==== By province/city ====
Province/City	Yes	No	Total
Abra	2,238	11,217	13,455
Agusan	21,378	14,601	35,979
Aklan	2,082	29,711	31,793
Albay	3,104	58,557	61,661
Angeles	2,399	7,064	9,463
Antique	1,166	36,674	37,840
Bacolod	3,307	17,038	20,345
Bago	1,978	4,192	6,170
Baguio	1,944	10,249	12,193
Basilan	1,847	4,738	4,585
Bataan	3,075	22,906	25,981
Batanes	267	1,725	1,992
Batangas	6,392	100,528	106,920
Benguet	1,229	16,693	17,922
Bohol	5,672	80,174	85,846
Bukidnon	4,252	20,348	24,600
Bulacan	12,791	108,632	121,423
Butuan	11,059	8,755	19,814
Cabanatuan	2,038	9,027	11,065
Cadiz	1,780	2,336	4,116
Cagayan	7,521	43,360	50,881
Cagayan de Oro	3,426	12,704	16,130
Calbayog	3,136	4,576	7,712
Caloocan	5,643	23,387	29,030
Camarines Norte	1,995	30,988	32,983
Camarines Sur	25,531	57,427	82,958
Camiguin	1,173	5,198	6,371
Canlaon	240	821	1,061
Capiz	2,028	27,211	29,239
Catanduanes	740	16,868	17,608
Cavite	9,184	34,320	43,504
Cavite City	1,762	6,617	8,379
Cebu	19,565	81,896	101,461
Cebu City	10,647	34,751	45,398
Cotabato	17,697	47,940	65,637
Cotabato City	1,271	3,490	4,761
Dagupan	1,523	12,404	13,927
Danao	3,012	2,093	5,015
Dapitan	1,931	2,474	4,405
Davao City	7,603	22,211	29,814
Davao del Norte	7,324	27,231	34,555
Davao del Sur	7,089	20,350	27,439
Davao Oriental	3,685	16,683	20,368
Dumaguete	893	6,343	7,236
Eastern Samar	3,814	26,016	29,830
Gingoog	942	4,587	5,529
Ifugao	346	4,242	4,588
Iligan	1,863	9,475	11,338
Ilocos Norte	6,013	37,914	43,927
Ilocos Sur	7,845	41,250	49,095
Iloilo	5,769	115,779	121,548
Iloilo City	2,931	29,956	32,887
Isabela	16,285	42,855	59,140
Kalinga-Apayao	1,541	8,577	10,118
La Carlota	543	4,745	5,288
La Union	4,340	54,666	59,006
Laguna	9,927	63,934	73,861
Lanao del Norte	4,653	21,567	26,220
Lanao del Sur	30,147	12,717	42,864
Laoag	1,068	10,818	11,886
Lapu-Lapu	1,423	4,157	5,580
Legazpi	841	10,539	11,380
Leyte	10,379	83,073	93,452
Lipa	1,065	10,668	11,733
Lucena	1,286	7,489	8,775
Manila	29,081	171,352	200,433
Marawi	5,033	1,580	6,613
Marinduque	876	16,615	17,491
Masbate	11,511	18,896	30,407
Misamis Occidental	2,386	30,820	33,206
Misamis Oriental	6,349	21,428	27,777
Mountain Province	724	7,944	8,668
Naga	3,011	5,813	8,824
Negros Occidental	18,118	55,322	73,440
Negros Oriental	5,895	39,355	45,250
Northern Samar	18,455	10,937	29,392
Nueva Ecija	11,207	82,318	93,525
Nueva Vizcaya	3,453	24,209	27,662
Occidental Mindoro	1,791	14,806	16,597
Olongapo	1,650	7,459	9,109
Oriental Mindoro	2,639	34,158	36,797
Ormoc	599	8,322	8,921
Ozamiz	486	10,613	11,099
Palawan	2,134	20,598	22,732
Palayan	24	273	297
Pampanga	10,236	63,329	73,565
Pangasinan	16,539	185,267	201,806
Pasay	5,194	22,755	27,949
Quezon	15,066	94,751	109,817
Quezon City	13,622	52,385	66,007
Rizal	38,116	141,654	179,770
Romblon	986	19,808	20,794
Roxas	688	5,070	5,758
San Carlos, Negros Occidental	2,568	3,405	5,973
San Carlos, Pangasinan	599	13,028	13,627
San Pablo	2,732	11,674	14,406
Silay	717	4,657	5,374
Sorsogon	2,733	49,981	52,714
South Cotabato	8,755	28,997	37,752
Southern Leyte	2,519	28,814	31,333
Sulu	9,350	18,003	27,353
Surigao del Norte	3,452	28,588	32,040
Surigao del Sur	2,748	25,749	28,497
Tacloban	960	9,870	10,830
Tagaytay	199	828	1,027
Tagbilaran	313	5,029	5,342
Tangub	112	3,219	3,331
Tarlac	8,057	61,105	69,162
Toledo	1,180	2,916	4,096
Trece Martires	40	242	282
Western Samar	7,263	17,908	25,171
Zambales	3,053	29,156	32,209
Zamboanga City	2,296	9,559	11,855
Zamboanga del Norte	6,051	22,300	28,351
Zamboanga del Sur	12,943	32,482	45,425
Total	652,127	3,286,879	3,939,006
Source: Congress

== See also ==
The 1967 Agusan division plebiscite was also held on this day. Unlike the national plebiscite, the division of Agusan province to two provinces, Agusan del Norte and Agusan del Sur, was approved by the voters.

The 1967 Philippine Senate election was also held on this day. While the government lost the plebiscite, the ruling Nacionalista Party won six of the eight seats contested in the election.

The 1967 Philippine House of Representatives special elections were also held on this day. The Nacionalistas also won all five of the seats contested.
