= 1939 Philippine constitutional plebiscite =

- 24 October 1939

Results
Choice	Votes	%
Yes	1,393,453	96.56%
No	49,633	3.44%
Valid votes	1,443,086	100.00%
Invalid or blank votes	0	0.00%
Total votes	1,443,086	100.00%

A plebiscite on the amendment to the Constitution of the Philippines pursuant to resolution of the dated November 3, 1939, setting up export tariffs for goods such as sugar. This occurred on October 24, 1939.

== Results ==
Should Philippine products be placed under duty-free quotas for the remainder of the Commonwealth?
Choice	Votes	%
For	1,393,453	96.56
Against	49,633	3.44
Total	1,443,086	100.00

1939 Philippine constitutional plebiscite results (excluding invalid votes)
Yes; 1,393,453 (96.6%)
▲50%

== See also ==
- Commission on Elections
- Politics of the Philippines
- Philippine elections
- Trade agreement
