= 1992 Philippine Sangguniang Kabataan elections =

Sangguniang Kabataan elections were held on December 4, 1992, after the enactment of the 1991 Local Government Code of the Department of the Interior and Local Government. The Sangguniang Kabataan (SK) (Youth Council) is the governing body in every chapter of the Katipunan ng Kabataan (Youth Federation). Each barangay in the Philippines is mandated by law to have its own chapter of the Katipunan ng Kabataan in which the members elect their officers called as the Sangguniang Kabataan.

The Sangguniang Kabataan is the youth legislature in every local village or community. It also initiates policies, programs and projects for the development of youth in their respective political territories. The Chairman of the Sangguniang Kabataan acts as the Chief Executive of the Sanggunian (Council) while the Kagawad (Councilor) as the legislative council. The Kagawads approve resolutions of the Sanggunian and appropriates the money allotted to the council, a share in the revenue of the Barangay.

The Chairman automatically sits in the Sangguniang Barangay (Village Council) as ex officio member. He automatically gets chairmanship of the Committee on Youth and Sports, one of the standing committees in the village council. Every Sangguniang Kabataan is then federated into municipal and city federations, then city and municipal federations are federated into a provincial federation.

The Barangay SK Captain represents the barangay in the municipal or city federation. The presidents of the city and municipal federation presidents becomes member of the provincial federation and the provincial federation president. The presidents of highly urbanized and independent component cities composed the membership in the national federation and elect the national federation president who automatically sits in the National Youth Commission as ex officio member of the commission.

== List of Provincial Federation Presidents ==
Christian Basalo Lariosa Mark Jayson Samonte (Bulacan) Mark Anthony Jerome Santiago (Bulacan) Winwin Garbo (Pampanga) Angelyn Paca (Ormoc City) Charles Vailoces (Cebu City) Janet Loreto (Tacloban City) Ryan Anthony Culima (Butuan City)Von Mark Mendoza(Pangasinan)

== See also ==
- Commission on Elections
- Politics of the Philippines
- Philippine elections
- Sangguniang Kabataan
