= 1905 Philippine local elections =

1905 Philippine local election
- January 15, 1905

Local elections were held for provincial and municipal posts throughout the Philippine Archipelago on January 15, 1905. Famous lawyers and doctors including the rich and the wealthy, political families were elected. Manuel L. Quezon and Sergio Osmeña Sr. were elected as the first Filipino provincial governors of Tayabas and Cebu.
