= 2007 Philippine barangay and Sangguniang Kabataan elections =

- October 29, 2007

All 41,995 Barangay Chairmen seats with 293,365 Sangguniang Barangay seats and all 41,995 SK Chairmen seats with 293,365 Katipunan ng mga Kabataan seats
Barangay Chairmen	41,995
Sangguniang Barangay	293,365
SK Chairmen	41,995
Katipunan ng mga Kabataan	293,365

Synchronized Barangay and Sangguniang Kabataan (SK) elections were held on October 29, 2007, based on the newly amended Republic Act No. 9340, approved on September 22, 2005, by the 13th Congress of the Philippines which prescribed that Barangay and SK elections would occur on the last Monday of October 2007 and in subsequent elections after three years. The 14th Congress of the Philippines tried twice to reset the Barangay and SK Elections instead to May 2008 so the elections could be trial for the computerization of elections following Republic Act No. 9369, also known as Amending the Election Modernization Act but were unsuccessful since the Senate rejected the bill. The elections were held in the country's 41,995 barangays and contested 41,995 posts for the Barangay Chairman also known as the Punong Barangay also for the SK Chairman and 293,965 posts for the Members of the Sangguniang Barangay also known as the Barangay Kagawad also for the Members of the Katipunan ng mga Kabataan also known as the SK Kagawad.

== Timeline ==
2005

- September 22 - Republic Act No. 9340 is passed which resets the Barangay and SK Elections to October 29, 2007. President Gloria Macapagal Arroyo was signed.

2007

- July 31 - The last day of voters' registration for Barangay Elections.
- August 3 - The Office of the President calls of classes for high school and college students so they can register for the Barangay and SK Elections.
- August 5 - The last day of voters' registration for SK Elections.
- September 5 to 7 - Student leaders, educators, top officials of the League of Municipalities and League of Cities of the Philippines, among other groups, called for the abolition of the SK.
- September 17 - The House of Representatives passed House Bill 2417, postponing the Barangay and SK elections, originally set October 29, to the first Monday of May 2009.
- September 23 - Senate Pres. Manuel B. Villar, Jr. said the Senate does not agree with the postponement of the Barangay and SK Elections and instead pushed for polls to go ahead on the October 29 polls. Villar also assured that the Senate would not file its own version of the bill for the postponement.
- September 29 - The Philippine National Police began its implementation of the mandatory 45-day gun ban in preparation for the upcoming Barangay and SK Elections.
- September 29 to October 18 - Barangay and Sangguniang Kabataan (SK) candidates filed their certificates of candidacy.
- October 1 - Commission on Elections (COMELEC) Chairman Benjamin Abalos Sr. resigned. The poll body, however, assured the upcoming Barangay and SK Elections will be held as scheduled. Commissioner Resureccion Z. Borra is made Acting Chairman of the COMELEC.
- October 3 - President Gloria Arroyo asked members of both chambers of Congress to support the House proposal seeking a two-year postponement of the October 29 Synchronized Barangay and SK Elections.
- October 19 to 27 - Official Campaign Period (Friday to Saturday Only)
- October 28 to 29 - Drinking of liquor, and giving, accepting free transportation, food, drinks and things of value by candidates are prohibited.
- 29 October 07:00 to 15:00 Philippine Time (UTC+8) - Election Day
- October 29 to 30 October 15:00 to 00:00 (UTC+8) - Counting of ballots and Proclamation of Barangay and SK Officials
- November 30 - Inauguration of all Barangay and SK Officials

== Sources ==
- Official Website of the Commission on Elections
- Republic Act No. 9340
