= 1996 Philippine Sangguniang Kabataan elections =

Sangguiniang Kabataan elections were held on May 5, 1996. The Sangguniang Kabataan (SK) (Youth Council) is the governing body in every chapter of the Katipunan ng Kabataan (Youth Federation). Each barangay in the Philippines is mandated by law to have its own chapter of the Katipunan ng Kabataan in which the members elect their officers called as the Sangguniang Kabataan. The Sangguniang Kabataan is the youth legislature in every local village or community.

== See also ==
- Commission on Elections
- Politics of the Philippines
- Philippine elections
