= 1997 Philippine barangay elections =

Barangay elections were held in the country's 42,000 barangays for the positions of barangay captains and six councilors on May 12, 1997.

== Electoral system ==
Barangays are the smallest division of the Philippines. They are governed by one Barangay captain, and seven barangay councilors. There is also the Sangguniang Kabataan, with one SK captain and seven SK Councilors, the SK Captain is also a part of the barangay council. For the captains, they use the First-past-the-post voting, where the one with the most votes wins, while the council uses the Plurality at large voting system.

== See also ==
- Commission on Elections
- Politics of the Philippines
- Philippine elections
- President of the Philippines
