= 2010 Philippine barangay and Sangguniang Kabataan elections =

- October 25, 2010

All 42,095 Barangay Chairmen positions with 294,715 Sangguniang Barangay seats and all 42,095 SK Chairmen positions with 294,715 Katipunan ng mga Kabataan seats
- Turnout: 70.80% (barangay); 90.18% (SK)
Barangay Chairmen	42,095
Sangguniang Barangay	294,715
SK Chairmen	42,095
Katipunan ng mga Kabataan	294,715

Synchronized Barangay and Sangguniang Kabataan (SK) elections were held on October 25, 2010, in the Philippines. The electorate elected in nonpartisan elections, the Barangay chairman also known as the Punong Barangay and members of the Sangguniang Barangay (Village council) for voters aged 18 and above. While voters aged 15 to 17 voted for the chairman of the Sangguniang Kabataan (Youth village council) and members of the Katipunan ng mga Kabataan. Due to funding issues, the Commission on Elections opted to use the manual voting system like with pre-2008 Philippine elections instead of the automated elections as was done in the last 2010 national elections.

== Background ==
Republic Act No. 9340 mandates that synchronized elections for the Barangay and SK elections to be held on the last Monday of October after three years, starting from 2007. There are 630,375 positions to be decided on Election Day in 42,095 barangays (Villages) across the Philippines. However, the elections have been postponed in several areas due to damage caused by Typhoon Megi (Juan) while in the provinces of Isabela, Cagayan and Kalinga where voting will start early from 6 AM to 2 PM instead of the normal voting hours from 7 AM to 3 PM.

The Commission on Elections has delivered the needed election paraphernalia to the voting areas on October 24, 2010, although there are areas were the materials were delivered late. The Philippine National Police (PNP) has heightened security in the lead-up to the polls and has placed it on full alert. Cases of election-related violence has reduced since 2007, with 29 incidents recorded since the nationwide gun ban on September 25, 2010.

=== Proposal to abolish the Barangay and Sangguniang Kabataan ===
Due to spending costs, there are proposals in the Senate to abolish the Sangguniang Kabataan (SK). Senator Teofisto Guingona III and Senator Franklin Drilon are proposing to replace SK with youth representatives to be elected in provincial, city and municipal boards. Enrile also proposed to abolish the Barangay system with mayors appointing leaders in the respective barangays instead.

== Candidates ==
The Department of the Interior and Local Government has issued a list of officials who have served multiple-terms which prohibited under the law, more commonly known as "multiple termers". Under COMELEC Resolution No. 9077, the Barangay Boards of Canvassers (BBOC) will suspend the proclamation of these candidates based on the list given. The COMELEC says that it will file charges of election disqualification and criminal charges if a candidate is proven as a multiple-termer. There are currently 4,433 barangay officials prohibited from running in the election and can only serve for three consecutive terms.

== Election day and aftermath ==
Elections were generally peaceful although there were reports of vote buying, ballot snatching and presence of armed groups of candidates notably in Abra and Antipolo. The Department of Education has suspended classes in all public elementary and high schools on October 26 to give teachers who served as Board of Election Inspectors (BEIs) in the elections a rest day.

President Benigno Aquino III was disappointed at the Commission on Elections on the delays in the deliveries of election paraphernalia before the polls were opened. He told the media in a press conference after voting in his home province of Tarlac this was a "simple undertaking" than the automated elections in May 2010. However, he asked people to come out and vote still in the elections.

=== Postponement of elections ===
Elections were postponed in 1,732 barangays due to the late delivery of election materials and ballot boxes. The barangays involved are in the provinces of Masbate, Albay, Catanduanes, Sorsogon, Pangasinan, Isabela, Cagayan, Tarlac, Capiz and Aklan. Failure of elections were declared as well in 23 barangays in Marawi City because election harassment and failure of the Board of Election Inspectors (BEIs) not showing up at the polling precincts. Also failure of election were declared in two barangays in Sultan Kudarat due to poll violence.

Pursuant to COMELEC Resolution No. 9078 issued on October 24, 2010, the elections will be held instead on October 26 or October 27 if the election materials will not be delivered by noon time on Election Day.

=== Election-related violence ===
Election-related violence incidents (ERVIs) have increased to 47 from 29, where 32 people have been killed as a result. This has reduced the number of cases from 67 in the last elections in 2007.

=== Inauguration of officials and start of term ===
After the officials won the elections for the 2010–2013 term, inauguration ceremonies of an oath of position were made at various dates of November 2010 depending on the barangay. The said term started on November 30, 2010 which stepped down and ended those from the previous 2007–2010 term.

== Statistics ==
=== Barangay elections ===
	Total	%
Voter turnout	34,154,174	70.80%
Registered voters	48,240,973	100%

=== SK elections ===
	Total	%
Voter turnout	2,083,069	90.18%
Registered voters	2,309,934	100%
