= 1989 Philippine barangay elections =

Barangay elections were held in the country's roughly 42,000 barangays for the positions of barangay captain and six councilors on March 28, 1989. Such elections are supposed to be held every three years but have often been postponed. Originally scheduled for November 1988, President Corazon Aquino and the military recommended its postponement for concern that infrastructure projects could be delayed in the provinces.

== See also ==
- Commission on Elections
- Politics of the Philippines
- Philippine elections
- President of the Philippines
