= 1994 Philippine barangay elections =

Barangay elections were held in the country's 42,000 barangays for the positions of barangay captains and six councilors on May 9, 1994.

In theory, barangay elections are separate from national elections, but by 1994, they all became expensive, involved patronage, and relied heavily upon the same local networks of voters to get out the vote. These and the other elections from 1993 to 1997 were called by President Fidel V. Ramos "bottomline tests for democracy".

The 1994 elections were the first regular elections in years; in 1988, the barangay elections had been postponed to 1989.

== See also ==
- Commission on Elections
- Politics of the Philippines
- Philippine elections
- President of the Philippines
