= Sangguniang Barangay =

Legislature in Philippine barangays

The Sangguniang Barangay, known in English as the Barangay Council, (Note: Formerly known as the Rural Council and then the Barrio Council) is the legislative body and governing council of a barangay, the smallest administrative division in the Philippines. Each barangay has its own Sangguniang Barangay. The term is derived from the Tagalog words sanggunian (lit. 'advisory') and barangay.

Each Sangguniang Barangay is headed by a barangay captain, who serves as the chief executive and is elected at-large by first-past-the-post voting. The council consists of seven regular members, all known as barangay councilors, who are elected at large by multi-member plurality voting, in which voters may vote for as many candidates as there are council seats. The chairperson of the Sangguniang Kabataan (the barangay's youth council), elected by registered voters aged 15 to 30, serves as the ex officio eighth member. In barangays with populations of indigenous peoples, an Indigenous Peoples Mandatory Representative (IPMR), elected separately, serves as the ex officio ninth member.

As with other elective local officials in the Philippines, members of the Sangguniang Barangay must be Filipino citizens and residents of the barangay for at least one year immediately preceding the barangay elections. Candidates for barangay captain and barangay councilor must be at least 18 years old on election day and able to read and write Filipino or any other language or dialect of the Philippines. Candidates for the Sangguniang Kabataan must be at least 18 years old but not more than 24 years old on election day.

As a collegiate body, the Sangguniang Barangay enacts ordinances and adopts resolutions for the effective administration of the barangay. Its powers and functions are defined by the Local Government Code of 1991. The barangay secretary and barangay treasurer are appointed by the barangay captain with the concurrence of the Sangguniang Barangay. Their qualifications, powers, and duties are likewise prescribed by the Local Government Code.

== History ==
Seal of the Barangay Council

During the American colonial period, appointed rural councils were created, with four councilors assisting the barrio lieutenant, now known as the barangay captain. The body was later renamed the Barrio Council. The Barrio Charter Act of 1959, enacted after Philippine independence in 1946, made members of the council elective rather than appointive.

In 1982, Batas Pambansa Blg. 222 (lit. 'National Law No. 222') provided for the election of barangay officials. Under the act, barangay officials consisted of the barangay captain (punong barangay or kapitan ng barangay) and six councilors (kagawad) comprising the Sangguniang Barangay. The Local Government Code of 1991 redefined the composition, powers, and functions of the Sangguniang Barangay and remains the governing law.

== See also ==
- Liga ng mga Barangay
- List of cities and municipalities in the Philippines
