= 2002 Philippine barangay and Sangguniang Kabataan elections =

Synchronized Barangay and Sangguniang Kabataan (SK) elections were held for the first time in the Philippines on July 15, 2002. The elections were now synchronized after the passage of Republic Act No. 9164 which was approved on March 19, 2002, by the 12th Congress of the Philippines. During the voter's registration from May 21 – 22 2002 had poor turnout, prompted calls for the abolition of SK.

== Sources ==
- Official Website of the Commission on Elections
- Republic Act No. 9164
