= Barangay councilor =

Elected legislator in the Philippines' smallest administrative divisions

A barangay councilor (Filipino: kagawad or konsehal) is an elected government official who is a member of the Sangguniang Barangay (Barangay Council) of a particular barangay, the smallest political unit in the Philippines. Each barangay council has seven regular councilors who are elected at-large by multi-member plurality voting. Barangay councilors are elected to three-year terms and are term-limited to three consecutive terms.

The chairperson of the Sangguniang Kabataan (barangay's youth council) who is elected by voters aged 15 to 30 years old, is the ex officio eighth councilor. Some barangays with a population of indigenous people have an Indigenous People's Mandatory Representative (IPMR) as the ex officio ninth councilor albeit elected separately.

The barangay councilors serve as the legislature of the barangay, while the barangay captain (Filipino: punong barangay) serves as the chief executive, together forming the Sangguniang Barangay.

== Composition ==
Each barangay has seven regular kagawads who are elected through at-large multi-member plurality voting: voters may vote for up to seven candidates, and the seven candidates with the highest number of votes are elected. Under the Local Government Code of 1991 (Republic Act 7160 as amended) Barangay kagawads are elected to three-year terms, and are term limited to three consecutive terms, for a total of nine years. They are elected during barangay elections, the most recent being the ones held on October 30, 2023.

== Authority ==
Under Article 152 of the Revised Penal Code of the Philippines, the barangay captain, members of barangay council, and members of the lupong tagapamayapa are considered persons in authority within their areas of jurisdiction.

== Duties and responsibilities ==
As part of the Sangguniang Barangay, barangay kagawads are expected to do the following, among others: (a) help in establishing, organizing, and promoting cooperative enterprises to improve the economic condition and well-being of the residents; (b) assist in regulating the use of multi-purpose halls, multi-purpose pavements, grain or copra dryers, patios and other post-harvest facilities, barangay waterworks, barangay markets, parking areas or other similar facilities constructed using government funds within the jurisdiction of the barangay and charge reasonable fees for its use; (c) assist in organizing community brigades, barangay tanod, or community service units as may be necessary; (d) assist in organizing regular lectures, programs, or fora on community problems such as sanitation, nutrition, literacy, and drug abuse, and convene assemblies to encourage citizen participation in government; (e) assist in adopting measures to prevent and control the proliferation of squatters and mendicants in the barangay; (f) assist in providing for the proper development and welfare of children in the barangay by promoting and supporting activities for the protection and total development of children, particularly those below seven years of age; (g) assist in adopting measures for the prevention and eradication of drug abuse, child abuse, and juvenile delinquency; (h) assist in initiating the establishment of a barangay high school, whenever feasible, in accordance with law; (i) assist in establishing a non-formal education center in the barangay whenever feasible, in coordination concerned government agencies; and (j) assist in the delivery of basic services.

== Benefits and compensation ==
Under the Local Government Code of 1991, a punong barangay shall receive an honorarium of not less than ₱50,000 per month while barangay kagawads shall get honoraria of ₱30,000 per month which may be adjusted as provided for in Executive Order No. 332. Aside from this, they also receive cash gift as Christmas bonus, insurance coverage, free hospitalization in government hospitals and free tuition and matriculation fees in government schools in their area for two of their legitimate dependent children for the duration of their terms only.
