= Barangay captain =

Highest elected official in a barangay (Philippines)

A barangay captain (Filipino: kapitan ng barangay), (Note: Commonly shortened to as kap) or a barangay chairman (Filipino: punong barangay), is the highest elected official in a barangay, the smallest level of administrative divisions of the Philippines. Sitios and puroks are sub-divisions of barangays, but their leadership is not elected. As of March 2022, there are 42,046 barangays and therefore 42,046 barangay captains.

The current position was created in 1991 and is a successor to historical positions known variously as cabeza de barangay, barrio lieutenant, and barrio captain.

Along with the college of barangay councilors, captains comprise the Sangguniang Barangay (barangay council). They perform many official government duties, and execute minor judicial powers as part of the Barangay Justice System, such as settling disputes between neighbors. Viewed as village elders, they also work informally with many organizations.

Captains are elected for three-year terms, although this may be modified due to election postponements. Their most recent elections were held on October 30, 2023.

== History ==
While the current structure dates only to the 1970s, the concept of a village leader has a long history, as it was already evident amongst pre-colonial barangays. During the Spanish era, the office was known by the title cabeza de barangay (literally, "head of the barangay"), and was an unelected post.

At the beginning of the American colonial period, the office was renamed barrio lieutenant. Under the Administrative Code of 1917, passed by the Philippine Assembly, these too were not elected but rather appointed by and under the supervision of the city councilor for the barrio. Councillors were elected at that time by electoral districts. Barrio lieutenants received no pay or other compensation. The lieutenant was to assist the city councilor and his term ended when the councilor's term ended.

During the American colonial period and after independence in 1946, barangays were known as barrios and barangay leaders were known as barrio lieutenants. In the U.S. the most similar political position to a barangay captain is a county executive (though the US counterpart covers more land and has more population on average than a Filipino barangay), the US colonial administration of the Philippines helped model the barangay captain's powers to that more of a US county executive.

In 1991, the position took its present name and form with amendments to the Local Government Code.

== Responsibilities ==
The captain, along with the barangay councilors (barangay kagawad) comprise the sangguniang barangay or barangay council. Apart from performing many official government duties, they also execute minor judicial powers as part of the Barangay Justice System, such as settling disputes between neighbors. They also work informally with many organizations at the local level.

Republic Act No. 10755 authorized the punong barangay to administer the oath of office of any government official, including the president of the Philippines and the vice president of the Philippines.

== Compensation ==
Barangay officials receive a salary of between ₱600 and ₱1,000 a month as per the Local Government Code. They receive other forms of compensation as well.

== See also ==
- Precolonial barangay
- Cabeza de barangay
- League of Barangays of the Philippines
- Poblacion
- List of cities and municipalities in the Philippines
- Pecalang and Hansip
