= List of members of the House of Representatives of the Philippines (T) =

This is a complete list of past and present members of the House of Representatives of the Philippines whose last names begin with the letter T.

This list also includes members of the Philippine Assembly (1907–1916), the Commonwealth National Assembly (1935–1941), the Second Republic National Assembly (1943–1944) and the Batasang Pambansa (1978–1986).

== Ta ==
- Gloria Tabiana, member for Iloilo's 3rd district (1965–1972)
- Ramon Tabiana, member for Iloilo's 3rd district (1953–1957, 1961–1965)
- Benjamin Tabios, member for Bukidnon (1965–1969)
- Bonifacio Tadiar, member for La Union (1943–1944)
- Rowena Niña Taduran, member for ACT-CIS party-list (2019–2022)
- Celia Taganas-Layus, member for Cagayan's 2nd district (2001–2004)
- Mario Tagarao, member for Quezon's 2nd district (1987–1990)
- Vicente Tagle, sectoral member (1992–1998)
- George Tait, member for Mountain Province's 3rd district (1935–1938), and Mountain Province's 1st district (1945–1949)
- Mariano Tajon, member for Ilocos Sur's 1st district (1992–1998)
- Gregorio Talavera, member for Ilocos Sur's 2nd district (1912–1916)
- Emmylou Taliño-Mendoza, member for Cotabato's 1st district (2001–2010)
- Josefina Tallado, member for Camarines Norte's 1st district (2019–present)
- Reynaldo Tamayo, member for Angat party-list (2022–2025)
- Gustavo Tambunting, member for Parañaque's 2nd district (2013–2019, 2022–2025)
- Joy Tambunting, member for Parañaque's 2nd district (2019–2022)
- Asani Tammang, member for Sulu's 2nd district (1992–2001)
- Datu Tampugaw, member for Mindanao and Sulu (1919–1925)
- Erin Tañada, member for Quezon's 4th district (2004–2013)
- Wigberto Tañada, member for Quezon's 4th district (1995–2001)
- Abdusakur Mahail Tan, member for Sulu's 1st district (1987–1992)
- Aiman Tan, member for Kusug Tausug party-list (2025–present)
- Alyssa Sheena Tan, member for Isabela's 4th district (2019–2022)
- Angelina Tan, member for Quezon's 4th district (2013–2022)
- Antolin Tan, member for Samar's 1st district (1934–1935)
- Carlos Tan, member for Leyte's 1st district (1922–1925, 1931–1935, 1938–1941, 1946–1949, 1953–1957)
- Dominador Tan, member for Leyte's 2nd district (1935–1941, 1945–1946, 1957–1965)
- Glicerio Tan, sectoral member (1995–1998)
- Godofredo Tan, member for Quezon's 2nd district (1969–1972), and Region IV-A (1978–1984)
- Gregorio Bienvenido Tan, member for Samar's 1st district (1953–1954)
- Joseph Tan, member for Isabela's 4th district (2022–present)
- Keith Micah Tan, member for Quezon's 4th district (2022–present)
- Milagrosa Tan, member for Samar's 2nd district (2010–2019)
- Reynolds Michael Tan, member for Samar's 2nd district (2022–present)
- Samier Tan, member for Sulu's 1st district (2019–present)
- Sharee Ann Tan, member for Samar's 2nd district (2007–2010, 2019–2022)
- Shernee Tan, member for Kusug Tausug party-list (2016–2025)
- Stephen James Tan, member for Samar's 1st district (2022–present)
- Jesus Tanchanco, member for Malabon–Navotas–Valenzuela (1984–1986)
- Caroline Tanchay, member for SAGIP party-list (2022–2025), and Kamalayan party-list (2025–present)
- Tiburcio Tancinco, member for Samar's 1st district (1928–1934, 1935–1938)
- Arturo Tanco Jr., member for Region IV-A (1978–1984)
- Dino Tanjuatco, member for Rizal's 2nd district (2022–present)
- Emigdio Tanjuatco Jr., member for Rizal (1984–1986), and Rizal's 2nd district (1987–1998)
- Moises Tapia, member for Catanduanes (1987–1992)
- Florante Tarona, sectoral member (1995–1998)
- Odie Tarriela, member for Occidental Mindoro (2022–present)
- Luis Taruc, member for Pampanga's 2nd district (1946, 1969–1972), and sectoral member (1978–1986)
- Francisco Tatad, member for Region V (1978–1984)
- Tabujur Taupan, member for Mindanao and Sulu (1928–1931)

== Te ==
- Pablo Tecson, member for Bataan (1912–1916)
- Jose Tejada, member for Cotabato's 3rd district (2013–2022)
- Gilbert Teodoro, member for Tarlac's 1st district (1998–2007)
- Maan Teodoro, member for Marikina's 1st district (2022–2025)
- Marcelino Teodoro, member for Marikina's 1st district (2007–2016, 2025–present)
- Mercedes Teodoro, member for Region III (1978–1984), and Tarlac (1984–1986)
- Manuel Terencio, member for Capiz's 3rd district (1922–1925)
- Kenneth Paolo Tereng, member for KM Ngayon Na party-list (2025–present)
- Arnolfo Teves Jr., member for Negros Oriental's 3rd district (2016–2023)
- Herminio Teves, member for Negros Oriental's 1st district (1969–1972), and Negros Oriental's 3rd district (1998–2007)
- Margarito Teves, member for Negros Oriental's 3rd district (1987–1998)
- Jose Teves Jr., member for TGP party-list (2019–present)
- Julian Teves, member for Negros Oriental (1943–1944), and Negros Oriental's 1st district (1945–1946)
- Lorenzo Teves, member for Negros Oriental's 1st district (1946–1949, 1953–1969)
- Pedro Teves, member for Negros Oriental's 2nd district (1919–1922)
- Pryde Henry Teves, member for Negros Oriental's 3rd district (2007–2016)
- Rey Teves, sectoral member (1987–1992)

== Ti ==
- John Rey Tiangco, member for Navotas (2019–2022)
- Toby Tiangco, member for Navotas (2010–2019, 2022–present)
- Emilio Tible, member for Camarines Sur's 1st district (1949–1957)
- Irwin Tieng, member for Buhay party-list (2007–2016), and Manila's 5th district (2022–present)
- Reginaldo Tilanduca, member for Bukidnon's 2nd district (1992–2001)
- Randolph Ting, member for Cagayan's 3rd district (2010–2019)
- Dante Tiñga, member for Taguig–Pateros (1987–1998)
- Sigfrido Tiñga, member for Taguig (2010–2013)
- Rodolfo Tingzon, member for Laguna's 2nd district (1992–1995)
- Antonio Tinio, member for ACT Teachers party-list (2010–2019, 2025–present)
- Eusebio Tionko, member for Surigao (1916–1922)
- Federico Tirador, member for Iloilo's 4th district (1922–1925, 1934–1935)
- Licurgo Tirador, member for Iloilo's 3rd district (1987–1998)
- David Tirol, member for Bohol (1984–1986), and Bohol's 2nd district (1987–1992)
- Emiliano Tria Tirona, member for Cavite (1909–1912, 1916–1919, 1931–1934)
- Tito Tizon, member for Samar's 2nd district (1946–1953)

== To ==
- Faustino Tobia, member for Ilocos Sur's 1st district (1946–1953)
- Leandro Tojong, member for Cebu's 5th district (1946–1949), and Cebu's 2nd district (1949–1953)
- Abraham Tolentino, member for Cavite's 7th district (2013–2019), and Cavite's 8th district (2019–2022)
- Aniela Tolentino, member for Cavite's 8th district (2022–present)
- Arturo Tolentino, member for Manila's 3rd district (1949–1957), Region IV (1978–1984), and Manila (1984–1986)
- Miguel Tolentino, member for Batangas's 1st district (1938–1941, 1945–1946)
- Acmad Tomawis, member for ALIF party-list (2004–2007, 2010–2013)
- Simeon Toribio, member for Bohol's 2nd district (1946–1953)
- Fermín Torralba, member for Bohol's 1st district (1922–1928)
- Juan Torralba, member for Bohol's 1st district (1935–1938)
- Lucy Torres-Gomez, member for Leyte's 4th district (2010–2013, 2013–2022)
- Bernardo Torres, member for Leyte's 1st district (1928–1931), and Leyte (1943–1944)
- Eller Torres, member for Region III (1978–1984)
- Ramon Torres, member for Negros Occidental's 2nd district (1925–1928, 1931–1935)
- Ruben Torres, member for Zambales's 2nd district (2001–2004)

== Tr ==
- Jerry Treñas, member for Iloilo City (2010–2019)
- Juan Triviño, member for Camarines Sur's 1st district (1961–1965)
- Pedro Trono, member for Iloilo's 1st district (1953–1969)

== Tu ==
- Dibu Tuan, member for South Cotabato's 3rd district (2025–present)
- Rodolfo Tuazon, member for Samar's 1st district (1992–2001)
- Sherwin Tugna, member for CIBAC party-list (2010–2019)
- Elnorita Tugung, member for Basilan (1992–1995)
- Generoso Tulagan, member for Pangasinan's 3rd district (1998–2007)
- Bensaudi Tulawie, member for Sulu's 1st district (1992–1998)
- Erwin Tulfo, member for ACT-CIS party-list (2023–2025)
- Jocelyn Tulfo, member for ACT-CIS party-list (2019–present)
- Ralph Tulfo, member for Quezon City's 2nd district (2022–present)
- Medardo Tumagay, member for Region IV-A (1978–1984)
- Jose Tumbokon, member for Aklan (1984–1986)
- Rafael Tumbokon, member for Capiz's 3rd district (1931–1938)
- Binky April Tupas, member for Iloilo's 5th district (2025–present)
- Jose Tupas, member for Rizal's 2nd district (1909–1912)
- Niel Tupas Sr., member for Iloilo (1978–1984), and Iloilo's 5th district (1987–1998)
- Niel Tupas Jr., member for Iloilo's 5th district (2007–2016)
- Raul Tupas, member for Iloilo's 5th district (2016–2025)
- Kalbi Tupay, member for Region IX (1978–1984)
- Antonio Tupaz, member for Region X (1978–1984)
- Sitti Dialia Turabin-Hataman, member for Anak Mindanao party-list (2013–2017)
- Alexie Tutor, member for Bohol's 3rd district (2019–present)
- Juan Tuvera, Cabinet member (1978–1984)
- Domingo Tuzon, member for Cagayan's 1st district (1987–1992)

== Ty ==
- Allan Ty, member for LPGMA party-list (2019–present)
- Arnel Ty, member for LPGMA party-list (2010–2019)
- Diego Ty, member for Misamis Occidental's 1st district (2019–2022)
- Mario Ty, member for Surigao del Sur's 1st district (1987–1998)
- Mary Elizabeth Ty-Delgado, member for Surigao del Sur's 1st district (2013–2016)
