= Legislative districts of Negros Oriental =

Legislative districts of Philippine province

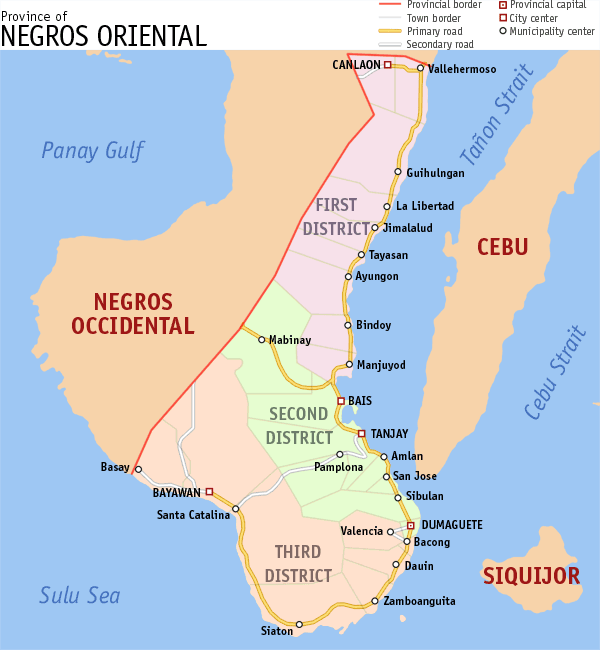
Map of the current congressional districts of Negros Oriental

The legislative districts of Negros Oriental are the representations of the province of Negros Oriental in the various national legislatures of the Philippines. The province is currently represented in the lower house of the Congress of the Philippines through its first, second, and third congressional districts.

== History ==
Negros Oriental was divided into two congressional districts from 1907 to 1972, it was redistricted into three congressional districts in 1986. It was part of the representation of Region VII from 1978 to 1984, and from 1984 to 1986 it elected 3 assemblymen at-large. Siquijor was last represented as part of the province's second district in 1972.

== 1st District ==
- Cities: Canlaon, Guihulngan (became city 2007)
- Municipalities: Ayungon, Bindoy, Jimalalud, La Libertad, Manjuyod, Tayasan, Vallehermoso
- Population (2020): 445,970

Period	Representative
8th Congress; 1987–1992	Jerome V. Paras
9th Congress; 1992–1995	Jerome V. Paras
10th Congress; 1995–1998	Jerome V. Paras
11th Congress; 1998–2001	Jacinto V. Paras
12th Congress; 2001–2004	Jacinto V. Paras
13th Congress; 2004–2007	Jacinto V. Paras
14th Congress; 2007–2010	Jocelyn Sy-Limkaichong
15th Congress; 2010–2013	Jocelyn Sy-Limkaichong
16th Congress; 2013–2016	Emmanuel L. Iway
17th Congress; 2016–2019	Jocelyn Sy-Limkaichong
18th Congress; 2019–2022	Jocelyn Sy-Limkaichong
19th Congress; 2022–2025	Jocelyn Sy-Limkaichong
20th Congress; 2025–2028	Emmanuel L. Iway

=== 1907–1972 ===
- Municipalities: Amlan (Ayuquitan Nuevo), Bais (became city 1968), Dumaguete (became city 1948), Guihulngan, Tanjay, Tayasan, Manjuyod (re-established 1908), Jimalalud (re-established 1910), Sibulan (re-established 1910), Vallehermoso (re-established 1913), La Libertad (re-established 1918), Canlaon (established 1946, became city 1961), Bindoy (Payabon) (established 1949), Pamplona (established 1959), San Jose (established 1955), Mabinay (established 1959)

Period	Representative
1st Philippine Legislature; 1907–1909	Leopoldo Rovira
2nd Philippine Legislature; 1909–1912	Hermenegildo T. Villanueva
3rd Philippine Legislature; 1912–1916	Hermenegildo T. Villanueva
4th Philippine Legislature; 1916–1919	Restituto Villegas
5th Philippine Legislature; 1919–1922	Restituto Villegas
6th Philippine Legislature; 1922–1925	Guillermo Z. Villanueva
7th Philippine Legislature; 1925–1928	Guillermo Z. Villanueva
8th Philippine Legislature; 1928–1931	Guillermo Z. Villanueva
9th Philippine Legislature; 1931–1934	Guillermo Z. Villanueva
10th Philippine Legislature; 1934–1935	Guillermo Z. Villanueva
1st National Assembly; 1935–1938	Guillermo Z. Villanueva
2nd National Assembly; 1938–1941	Guillermo Z. Villanueva
1st Commonwealth Congress; 1945	Julian L. Teves
1st Congress; 1946–1949	Lorenzo G. Teves
2nd Congress; 1949–1953	Pedro A. Bandoquillo
3rd Congress; 1953–1957	Lorenzo G. Teves
4th Congress; 1957–1961	Lorenzo G. Teves
5th Congress; 1961–1965	Lorenzo G. Teves
6th Congress; 1965–1969	Lorenzo G. Teves
7th Congress; 1969–1972	Herminio G. Teves

== 2nd District ==
- City: Bais, Dumaguete, Tanjay (became city 2001)
- Municipalities: Amlan, Mabinay, Pamplona, San Jose, Sibulan
- Population (2020): 535,632

Period	Representative
8th Congress; 1987–1992	Miguel L. Romero
9th Congress; 1992–1995	Miguel L. Romero
10th Congress; 1995–1998	Miguel L. Romero
11th Congress; 1998–2001	Emilio C. Macias II
12th Congress; 2001–2004	Emilio C. Macias II
13th Congress; 2004–2007	Emilio C. Macias II
14th Congress; 2007–2010	George P. Arnaiz
15th Congress; 2010–2013	George P. Arnaiz
16th Congress; 2013–2016	George P. Arnaiz
17th Congress; 2016–2019	Manuel T. Sagarbarria
18th Congress; 2019–2022	Manuel T. Sagarbarria
19th Congress; 2022–2025	Manuel T. Sagarbarria
20th Congress; 2025–2028	Ma. Isabel L. Sagarbarria

=== 1907–1972 ===
- Municipalities: Bacong, Bayawan (Tolong Nuevo), Dauin, Larena, Lazi, Siaton, Siquijor, Valencia (Nueva Valencia, later Luzuriaga), Zamboanguita (established 1908), San Juan (re-established 1908), Maria (re-established 1909), Enrique Villanueva (Talingting) (established 1924), Santa Catalina (Tolong Viejo) (re-established 1947), Basay (established 1968)

Period	Representative
1st Philippine Legislature; 1907–1909	Vicente Locsin
2nd Philippine Legislature; 1909–1912	Teofisto J. Guingona Sr. (Note: Resigned in 1914 to become governor of the old unified Agusan province (now Agusan del Norte and Agusan del Sur).)
3rd Philippine Legislature; 1912–1916	Teofisto J. Guingona Sr.
3rd Philippine Legislature; 1912–1916	Leopoldo Rovira (Note: Served the unexpired term of representative Teofisto Guingona Sr.)
4th Philippine Legislature; 1916–1919	Felipe Tayko
5th Philippine Legislature; 1919–1922	Pedro Teves
6th Philippine Legislature; 1922–1925	Fermin Martinez
7th Philippine Legislature; 1925–1928	Enrique C. Villanueva
8th Philippine Legislature; 1928–1931	Enrique C. Villanueva
9th Philippine Legislature; 1931–1934	Jose E. Romero
10th Philippine Legislature; 1934–1935	Jose E. Romero
1st National Assembly; 1935–1938	Jose E. Romero
2nd National Assembly; 1938–1941	Jose E. Romero
1st Commonwealth Congress; 1945	Jose E. Romero
1st Congress; 1946–1949	Enrique Medina Sr.
2nd Congress; 1949–1953	Enrique Medina Sr.
3rd Congress; 1953–1957	Lamberto L. Macias
4th Congress; 1957–1961	Lamberto L. Macias
5th Congress; 1961–1965	Lamberto L. Macias
6th Congress; 1965–1969	Lamberto L. Macias
7th Congress; 1969–1972	Lamberto L. Macias

== 3rd District ==
- City: Bayawan (became city 2000)
- Municipalities: Bacong, Basay, Dauin, Santa Catalina, Siaton, Valencia, Zamboanguita
- Population (2020): 451,388

Period	Representative
8th Congress; 1987–1992	Margarito B. Teves
9th Congress; 1992–1995	Margarito B. Teves
10th Congress; 1995–1998	Margarito B. Teves
11th Congress; 1998–2001	Herminio G. Teves
12th Congress; 2001–2004	Herminio G. Teves
13th Congress; 2004–2007	Herminio G. Teves
14th Congress; 2007–2010	Pryde Henry A. Teves
15th Congress; 2010–2013	Pryde Henry A. Teves
16th Congress; 2013–2016	Pryde Henry A. Teves
17th Congress; 2016–2019	Arnolfo A. Teves Jr.
18th Congress; 2019–2022	Arnolfo A. Teves Jr.
19th Congress; 2022–2023	Arnolfo A. Teves Jr.
19th Congress; 2023–2025	Vacant (Arnolfo A. Teves Jr. expelled); *House Speaker Martin Romualdez served as legislative caretaker from August 2023 to June 2025.
20th Congress; 2025–2028	Janice V. Degamo

== At-Large (defunct) ==
=== Malolos Congress ===
Period	Representative
Malolos Congress; 1898–1899	Pio del Pilar (Note: Provisional representative appointed by the Revolutionary Government.)
Malolos Congress; 1898–1899	Mariano Oirola
Malolos Congress; 1898–1899	Luciano San Miguel

=== 1943-1944 ===
- Includes present-day Siquijor

Period	Representative
National Assembly; 1943–1944	Julian L. Teves
National Assembly; 1943–1944	Guillermo Z. Villanueva

=== 1984-1986 ===
Period	Representative
Regular Batasang Pambansa; 1984–1986	Ricardo D. Abiera
Regular Batasang Pambansa; 1984–1986	Andres C. Bustamante
Regular Batasang Pambansa; 1984–1986	Emilio C. Macias II

== See also ==
- Legislative district of Siquijor
