= Negros Oriental Provincial Board =

Legislative body of the province of Negros Oriental, Philippines

Oriental Negros Provincial Board Sangguniang Panlalawigan ng Negros Oriental Sangguniang Panlalawigan sa Sidlakang Negros Junta Provincial de Negros Oriental
- 10th Negros Oriental Provincial Board

Type
- Type: Unicameral
- Term limits: 3 terms (9 years)

Leadership
- Presiding Officer: Cezanne Fritz H. Diaz, PFP

Structure
- Seats: 13 board members 1 ex officio presiding officer
- Political groups: PFP (10) Nonpartisan (2)
- Length of term: 3 years
- Authority: Local Government Code of the Philippines

Elections
- Voting system: Multiple non-transferable vote (regular members); Indirect election (ex officio members)
- Last election: May 9, 2022
- Next election: May 12, 2025

Meeting place
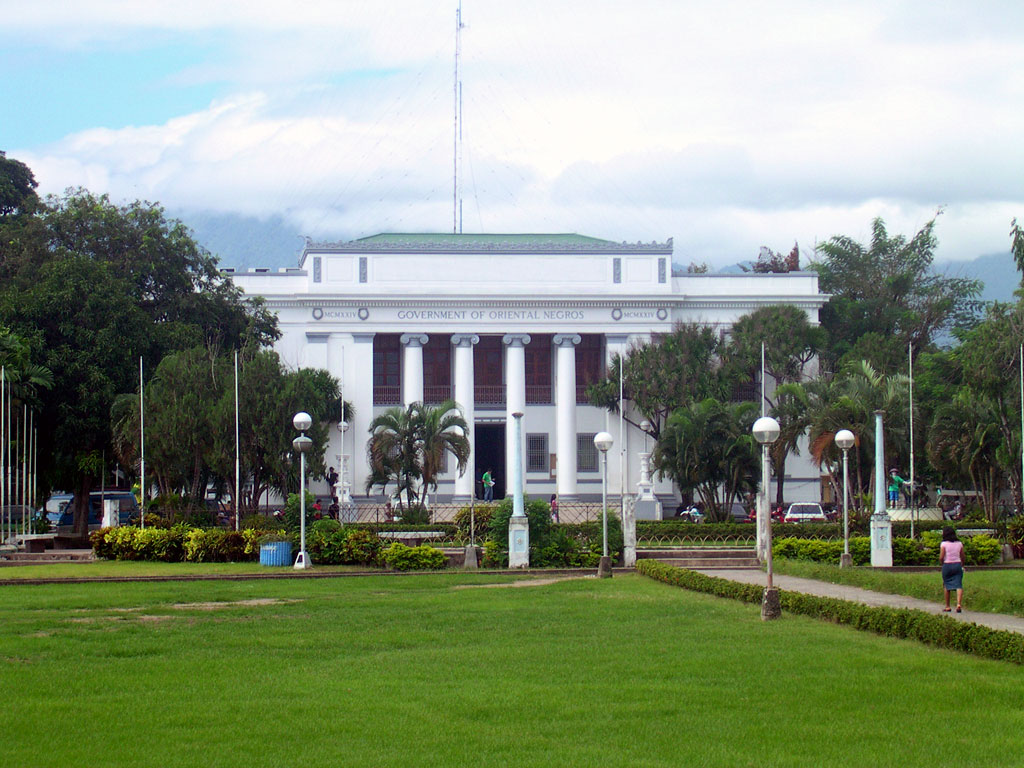
- Negros Oriental Provincial Capitol, Dumaguete

The Oriental Negros Provincial Board is the Sangguniang Panlalawigan (provincial legislature) of the Philippine province of Negros Oriental.

The members are elected via three provincial board districts, coextensive with the legislative districts of Negros Oriental, each sending three members to the provincial board; the electorate votes for three members, with the three candidates with the highest number of votes being elected. The Vice Governor of Negros Oriental is the ex officio presiding officer, elected with the Governor. As ex officio presiding officer, he only votes to break ties.

== District apportionment ==
Elections	No. of seats per district			Ex officio seats	Total seats
Elections	1st	2nd	3rd	Ex officio seats	Total seats
2016–present	3	4	3	3	13

== List of members ==
An additional three ex officio members are the presidents of the provincial chapters of the Association of Barangay Captains, the Councilors' League, the Sangguniang Kabataan provincial president; the municipal and city (if applicable) presidents of the Association of Barangay Captains, Councilor's League and Sangguniang Kabataan, shall elect amongst themselves their provincial presidents which shall be their representatives at the board.

=== Current members ===
These are the members after the 2025 local elections and 2023 barangay and SK elections:

- Vice Governor: Cezanne Fritz H. Diaz (PFP)

Seat	Board member	Party	Start of term	End of term
1st district	Rusty B. Serion	PFP	June 30, 2025	June 30, 2028
1st district	Marianne Angelee A. Soliva	PFP	June 30, 2025	June 30, 2028
1st district	Jessica Jane J. Villanueva	PFP	June 30, 2022	June 30, 2028
2nd district	Nyrth Christian R. Degamo	PFP	June 30, 2022	June 30, 2028
2nd district	Erwin Michael L. Macias	PFP	June 30, 2025	June 30, 2028
2nd district	Woodrow S. Maquiling Sr.	PFP	June 30, 2022	June 30, 2028
2nd district	Apolinario P. Arnaiz Jr.	PFP	June 30, 2022	June 30, 2028
3rd district	Peter Paul F. Renacia	PFP	June 30, 2019	June 30, 2028
3rd district	Marcelo G. Adanza	PFP	June 30, 2022	June 30, 2028
3rd district	Carlo C. Degamo Remontal	PFP	June 30, 2022	June 30, 2028
ABC		Nonpartisan		
PCL				
SK		Nonpartisan		

=== Vice governor ===
Election year	Name	Party	Ref.
2016	Edward Mark L. Macias	Liberal	
2019	Edward Mark L. Macias	Liberal	
2022	Carlo Jorge Joan L. Reyes (June 30, 2022–March 4, 2023) (Note: Elevated to Governor on March 4, 2023 upon the death of Governor Roel Degamo.)	Nacionalista	
2022	Manuel L. Sagarbarria (March 4–May 31, 2023) (Note: Board Member elevated to Vice Governor) (Note: Elevated to Governor on May 31, 2023 upon the death of Governor Carlo Jorge Joan "Guido" Reyes.)	NPC	
2022	Jaime L. Reyes (May 31, 2023–June 30, 2025)	Liberal	
2025	Cezanne Fritz H. Diaz	PFP	

=== 1st district ===
- City: Canlaon, Guihulngan City
- Municipalities: Ayungon, Bindoy, Jimalalud, La Libertad, Manjuyod, Tayasan, Vallehermoso
- Population (2024):

Election year	Member (party)	Member (party)	Member (party)	Ref.
2016	Jessica Jane J. Villanueva (Liberal)	Jaime L. Reyes (Liberal)	Georgita F. Martinez (Liberal)	
2019	Valente D. Yap (Liberal)	Jaime L. Reyes (Liberal)	Chester V. Lim (Liberal)	
2022	Julius C. Sabac (Independent)	Jaime L. Reyes (Note: Elevated to vice governor.) (until May 31, 2023) (Liberal)	Jessica Jane J. Villanueva (Liberal)	
2022	Julius C. Sabac (Independent)	Marie Carlisle D. Reyes (since October 11, 2023) (Liberal)	Jessica Jane J. Villanueva (Liberal)	
2025	Marianne Angelee A. Soliva (PFP)	Rusty B. Serion (PFP)	Jessica Jane J. Villanueva (PFP)	

=== 2nd district ===
- City: Bais, Dumaguete, Tanjay
- Municipalities: Amlan, Mabinay, Pamplona, San Jose, Sibulan
- Population (2024):

Election year	Member (party)	Member (party)	Member (party)	Member (party)	Ref.
2016	Mariant E. Escaño-Villegas (NPC)	Rommel L. Erames (NPC)	Nilo D. Sayson (NPC)	Arturo V. Umbac (UNA)	
2019	Jose "Petit" A. Baldado (Nacionalista)	Erwin Michael L. Macias (NPC)	Estanislao V. Alviola (Independent)	Mariant E. Escaño-Villegas (NPC)	
2022	Manuel L. Sagarbarria (until March 4, 2023) (NPC) (Note: Elevated to Vice Governor on March 4, 2023.)	Nyrth Christian R. Degamo (Nacionalista)	Woodrow S. Maquiling Sr. (NPC)	Apolinario P. Arnaiz Jr. (Lakas)	
2022	Alvin R. Uy (since June 13, 2023) (NPC)	Nyrth Christian R. Degamo (Nacionalista)	Woodrow S. Maquiling Sr. (NPC)	Apolinario P. Arnaiz Jr. (Lakas)	
2025	Erwin Michael L. Macias (PFP)	Nyrth Christian R. Degamo (PFP)	Woodrow S. Maquiling Sr. (PFP)	Apolinario P. Arnaiz Jr. (PFP)	

=== 3rd district ===
- City: Bayawan
- Municipalities: Bacong, Basay, Dauin, Santa Catalina, Siaton, Valencia, Zamboanguita
- Population (2024):

Election year	Member (party)	Member (party)	Member (party)	Ref.
2016	Peve O. Ligan (NPC)	Edmund F. Dy (NPC)	Kit Mark B. Adanza (NUP)	
2019	John "Jack" T. Raymond Jr. (NPC)	Peter Paul F. Renacia (NPC)	Kit Mark B. Adanza (Nacionalista)	
2022	Kit Marc B. Adanza (NPC)	Peter Paul F. Renacia (NPC)	Carlo C. Degamo Remontal (NP)	
2025	Marcelo G. Adanza (PFP)	Peter Paul F. Renacia (PFP)	Carlo C. Degamo Remontal (PFP)	
