= José E. Romero =

Filipino politician (1897–1978)

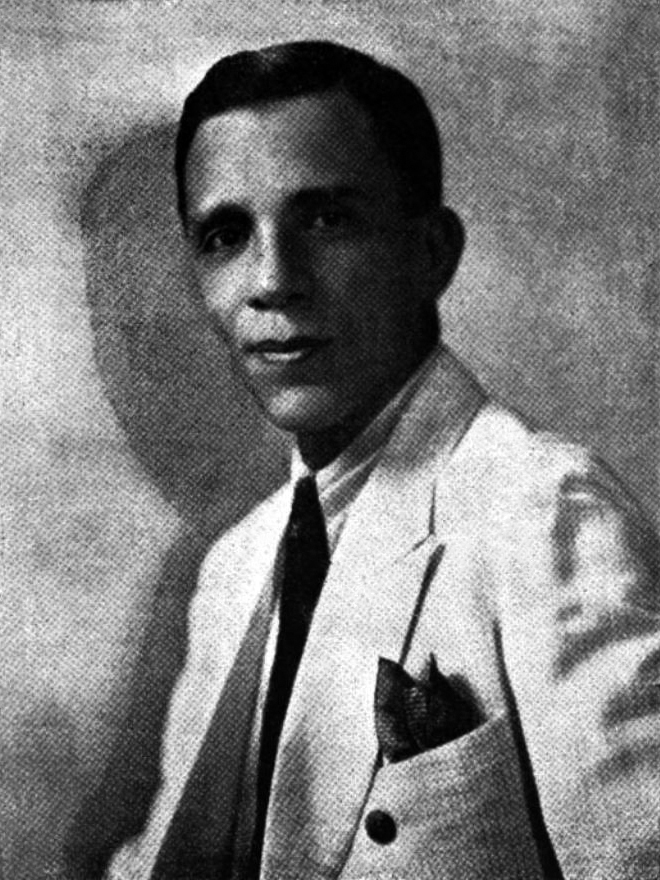
- Photograph from The Commercial & Industrial Manual of the Philippines, 1941

33rd Secretary of Education
- In office 1 June 1959 – 4 September 1962
- President: Carlos P. Garcia; Diosdado P. Macapagal
- Preceded by: Daniel Salcedo
- Succeeded by: Jose Y. Tuazon

Ambassador Extraordinary and Plenipotentiary of the Republic of the Philippines to the United Kingdom
- In office 6 September 1949 – 1953
- President: Elpidio Quirino
- Preceded by: Don Ramón J. Fernandez (as Minister Plenipotentiary)
- Succeeded by: León María Guerrero III

Senator of the Philippines
- In office 25 May 1946 – 22 May 1947

House Majority Leader National Assembly Majority Leader (1935–1938)
- In office 1934 – 15 August 1938
- Preceded by: Francisco Varona
- Succeeded by: Quintín Paredes

Member of the House of Representatives from Negros Oriental's 2nd District Member of the National Assembly (1935–1941)
- In office 9 June 1945 – 23 April 1946
- Preceded by: District recreated
- Succeeded by: Enrique Medina Sr.
- In office 1931 – 30 December 1941
- Preceded by: Enrique Villanueva
- Succeeded by: Position abolished

Member of the Negros Oriental Provincial Board
- In office 1925–1931

Personal details
- Born: José Derecho y Muñoz; 3 March 1897 Bais, Negros Oriental, Captaincy General of the Philippines
- Died: 23 October 1978 (aged 81) Manila, Philippines
- Resting place: Manila North Cemetery, Santa Cruz, Manila, Philippines
- Party: Nacionalista (1925-1978)
- Spouses: Pilar Guzmán Sinco (m. 1923; died 1927) Elisa Zuñiga Villanueva (m. 1930)
- Children: Edgar Romero; Maria Luisa Romero-Gabaldón; Jose Emeterio Romero Jr. Teresita Romero-Romulo; Ernesto Romero; Rodolfo Romero; Raquel Romero-Smith; George Albert Romero
- Education: University of the Philippines; Silliman University
- Profession: Diplomat, Politician, Lawyer, Publisher

José Emeterio Muñoz Romero Sr. (3 March 1897 – 23 October 1978), commonly known as José E. Romero, was a statesman and diplomat from the Philippines. He represented Negros Oriental's Second District and was Majority Floor Leader during the Ninth and Tenth Philippine Legislatures and the First and Second National Assemblies of the Philippines. He was senator-elect of the First Congress of the Philippines and later became the first Philippine ambassador to the United Kingdom and Secretary of Education.

== Early life and education ==
Romero was born as José Derecho y Muñoz on 3 March 1897, one of three children born to Francisco Romero Sr., mayor of Tanjay, Negros Oriental from 1909 to 1916 and later a member of the Provincial Board of Negros Oriental, and Josefa Calumpang Muñoz, daughter of Tanjay gobernadorcillo Don José Teves Muñoz and Doña Aleja Ines Calumpang. His mother died in a stampede that occurred on 24 December 1906 while midnight mass was being celebrated at the St. James the Greater Parish in Tanjay. A group of hooligans falsely announced the approach of pulahanes, a notorious group of bandits, which resulted in a stampede that killed and injured churchgoers rushing to leave the church.

Beginning in 1904, he received primary instruction in the public schools of Tanjay where he spent his formative years. In 1905, he moved to study at Silliman Institute in Dumaguete, Negros Oriental. In 1907, when he was only 10 years old, he was appointed municipal school teacher in Tanjay. From 1908 to 1913, he studied at the Negros Oriental High School for secondary education until he went on to Manila High School where he finished in 1915. As a student in Manila, he was the ward of his father's only sister Adela Romero de Prats and her husband Francisco Prats Mestre.

Romero completed his Associate of Arts degree at Silliman Institute and then went on to the University of the Philippines (UP) to finish a bachelor's degree graduating cum laude in 1917. As a student at UP, he was awarded first prize in a university-wide poetry contest. He also received the Quezon medal in an oratorical contest and was awarded first prize in the Philippines Free Press literary contest for UP students.

After graduation, he enrolled at the University of the Philippines College of Law but had to temporarily postpone his studies due to ill health. He eventually returned to law school upon recovery and completed his Bachelor of Laws degree in 1922. He was admitted to the Philippine Bar and practiced law in Manila before returning to Negros Oriental in 1924.

On 17 July 1918, Romero and Carlos P. Romulo led the first student protest march at UP to show support for university president Ignacio Villamor who was then being criticized and defamed by newspaper columnist Manuel Xerez Burgos of The Manila Times. In April 1922, Romero was a delegate to the World Student Christian Federation conference held at Tsinghua University in Beijing.

Romero published The Rising Philippines in 1917, the first English language magazine published by Filipinos, together with Romulo, Mauro Mendez and Fernando Maramag as editor-in-chief. He succeeded Maramag as editor of the Philippines National Weekly from 1918 to 1920. Later on, he was the sole owner and publisher of the Oriental Negros Chronicle. Romero also wrote the lyrics of the university hymn of the Philippine Women's University.

== Political career ==
Romero, together with his cousin Angel Calumpang, was elected to the Provincial Board of Negros Oriental for two consecutive terms from 1925 to 1928 and from 1928 to 1931 during the incumbency of Atilano Villegas as provincial governor.

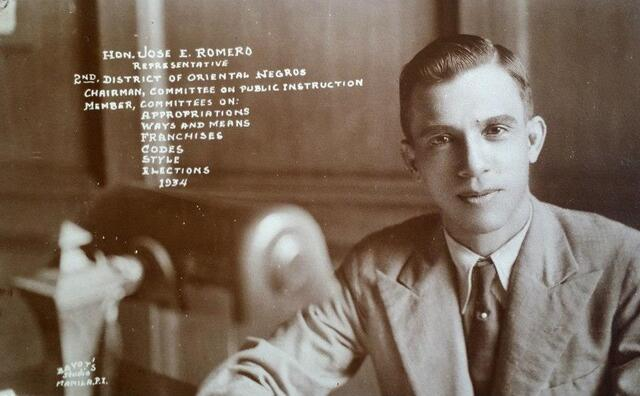
Romero in 1934

In 1931, he was elected to the 9th Philippine Legislature as representative of Negros Oriental's second district. In 1934, he became majority floor leader replacing Francisco Varona. In the same year, he became a delegate to the 1934 Constitutional Convention that drafted the 1935 Philippine Constitution.

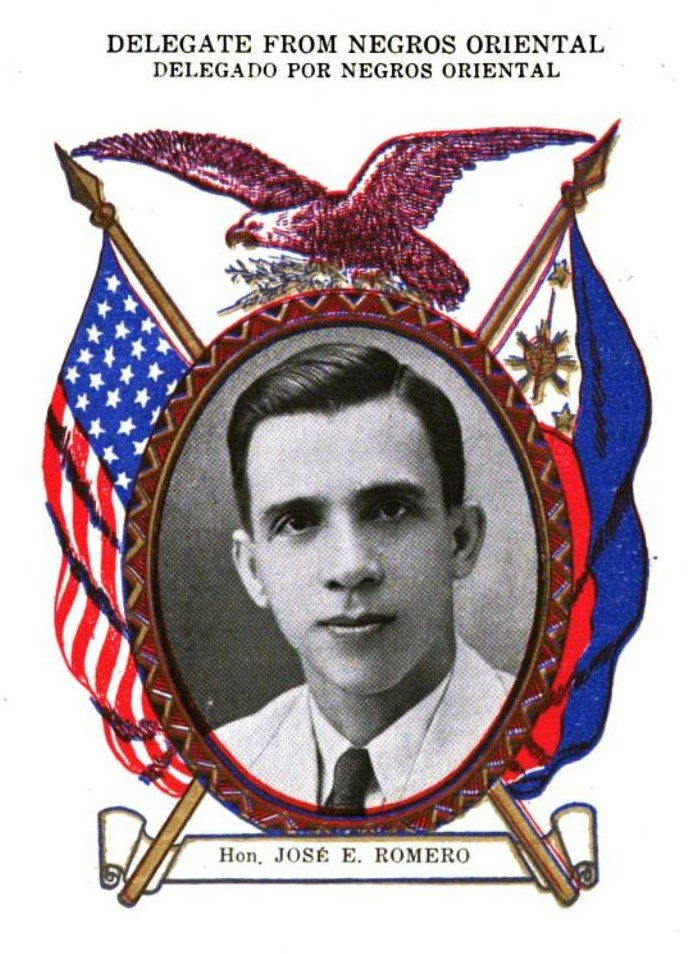
Romero as a delegate to the Philippine Constitutional Convention, published by Benipayo Press (c. 1935)

He was reelected to the 10th Philippine Legislature and remained as majority floor leader, which only lasted until the following year when it was effectively replaced by a unicameral national assembly as a result of the 1935 Constitution.

In 1935, Romero was elected to the National Assembly. He served for two consecutive terms from 1935 to 1938 and from 1938 to 1941. He was majority floor leader from 1935 to 1938, and was concurrently chairman of the Congressional standing committees on rules and on education, and ex-officio member of the Board of Regents of the University of the Philippines. He was succeeded as majority floor leader by Quintin Paredes in 1938.

In 1937, he was appointed by Manuel L. Quezon to the Joint Preparatory Committee on Philippine Affairs (JPCPA), which was convened to study the United States Tariff Commission report and review the trade provisions of the Tydings–McDuffie Act, officially known as the Philippine Independence Act.

In 1939, during a meeting convoked by President Quezon, he called for an indefinite suspension of the planned 1946 Philippine independence, which was under the threat of World War II. Together with fellow assemblymen Salvador Z. Araneta, Tomas Oppus and Carlos Tan, they formed the Philippine Civic League, which conducted education campaigns on the problems and deficiencies of the Philippine independence mission.

In 1946, Romero was elected to the Philippine Senate but was replaced by Prospero Sanidad after a highly politicized electoral protest filed against him and senators-elect Ramon M. Diokno and Jose O. Vera, and elected members of congress belonging to the Democratic Alliance.

== Government service ==
Romero in 1949 as Philippine foreign minister, later first ambassador, to the Court of St. James's.

In 1917, after finishing his undergraduate degree, he worked as an assessor at the Bureau of Customs but only stayed on for four months due to conflicts in schedule with his classes at law school.

Romero was appointed as a member of the Philippine Surplus Property Commission by Manuel Roxas in 1948.

On 20 August 1949, Romero was appointed by Elpidio Quirino as envoy extraordinary and minister plenipotentiary of the Philippine foreign service. He took his oath of office on 6 September 1949 as minister of the Philippine Legation to London, replacing Don Ramon Fernandez who was appointed to the Philippine Council of State. He was accredited by the Court of St. James's on 9 November 1949. The legation was later upgraded to embassy status with Romero serving as the first ambassador extraordinary and plenipotentiary of the Philippines to the Court of St. James's. While ambassador, he headed the Philippine delegation, which included senator José Locsin, to the 1953 International Sugar Agreement convened by the United Nations in London.

In 1953, he ended his tour of duty when he resigned to become the representative of the Philippine Sugar Association (PSA) to Washington for whom he was longtime executive officer and secretary-treasurer, and later president. Upon the recommendation of the PSA, he served as a director of the Philippine Sugar Institute (PHILSUGIN), an agency tasked to conduct research work for the sugar industry in all its phases, agricultural and industrial. PHILSUGIN together with the then Sugar Quota Administration (SQA) effectively replaced the Philippine Sugar Administration in 1951. In May 1956, together with Joaquín M. Elizalde who was chief delegate, he represented the Philippines at one of the meetings of the United Nations Sugar Conference, which opened at the Headquarters of the United Nations in New York.

Romero served as Secretary of Education to Carlos P. Garcia and Diosdado P. Macapagal from 1959 to 1961 and from 1961 to 1962 respectively. He was then concurrently ex-officio chairman of the Jose Rizal National Centennial Commission, a commission created in 1954 by Ramon Magsaysay to spearhead preparations for the centenary of José Rizal's birth in 1961. He was also ex-officio chairman of the Board of Regents of the University of the Philippines.

On 13 August 1959, Romero issued Department Order (D.O.) no. 7, s. 1959 ordering the use of the term Pilipino as the proper name for the national language of the Philippines, which up until that point was referred to as either wikang pambansa or Tagalog.

== Personal life ==
=== Marriage and children ===
He was married to Pilar Guzmán Sinco, a schoolteacher and sister of University of the Philippines president and United Nations Charter signatory Vicente G. Sinco, on 16 June 1923 and had one child:

- Edgar Romero (7 July 1924 – 28 May 2013), National Artist of the Philippines for Cinema and Broadcast Arts

After the death of his first wife in childbirth on 7 July 1927, he married Elisa Zuñiga Villanueva on 6 September 1930. She was the granddaughter of Don Leonardo Villanueva, brother of senator Hermenegildo Villanueva. They had seven children:

- Maria Luisa Romero (11 November 1931 – 9 June 1987), married to Pelayo Valera Gabaldón, grandson of Filipino statesman Isauro Gabaldón and nephew of Ramon O. Valera, National Artist of the Philippines for Fashion Design.
- Jose Emeterio Romero Jr. (4 May 1934 - 10 September 2018), former Philippine ambassador extraordinary and plenipotentiary to Italy; co-founder of the Makati Business Club; former permanent representative to the Food and Agriculture Organization and the International Fund for Agricultural Development; former executive director of the Common Fund for Commodities; former chairman of the Philippine Coconut Authority; formerly married to Carmelita Beatriz Corominas, niece of Anita Corominas-Guerrero, wife of Leon Ma. Guerrero III.
- Teresita Romero (died in 1992), married in 1961 to lawyer Ricardo J. Romulo, son of Filipino statesman Carlos P. Romulo.
- Jose Ernesto Romero, president of the Georgetown Club of the Philippines.
- Jose Rodolfo Romero, lawyer and journalist.
- Raquel Romero-Smith, retired diplomat and civil servant.
- George Albert Romero, former diplomat and civil servant.

=== SS Corregidor ===
On 17 December 1941, he was aboard the ill-fated SS Corregidor when it hit a mine off the coast of Manila Bay where his cousin Juanito Calumpang, an academic supervisor of the Department of Education, and his daughter died. His wife's great-uncle Hermenegildo Villanueva and his son also perished in the incident.

=== Ancestry ===
Romero's paternal grandfather José Maria Romero emigrated from Sanlúcar de Barrameda in the middle of the 19th century and married Maria Ramona Derecho of Manila. His maternal family was descended from gentry who were part of the Principalía. His maternal grandfather José Teves Muñoz was the last gobernadorcillo and capitan municipal of Tanjay who became the town's first presidente municipal in 1901.

His maternal grandmother Aleja Silva Calumpang was the daughter of Leogardo Garcia Calumpang, a capitan pasado of Tanjay. Siblings Martin Silva Calumpang and Agapito Silva Calumpang, as well as brother-in-law Don Bernardo Vea Barot were also capitanes pasados of Tanjay. Agapito later became the first vice presidente municipal of Tanjay in 1901. Jose E. Romero's maternal grandmother Aleja Silva Calumpang was a great-granddaughter of Fernando Vélaz de Medrano y Bracamonte y Dávila, 4th Marquess of Tabuérniga de Velazar (es), 15th Marquis of Cañete (GE) (es), 6th Marquis of Fuente el Sol (es), 8th Marquis of Navamorcuende (es), 15th Lord of Montalbo, and Knight of the Order of Malta who was exiled to the Philippines in 1781. Through his maternal grandmother, Romero was a descendant of Alfonso XI of Castile through four of his sons: Peter of Castile, the twins Henry II of Castile and Fadrique Alfonso, 1st Lord of Haro, and Sancho Alfonso, 1st Count of Albuquerque. Through Peter of Castile's mother Maria of Portugal, he was also a descendant of Afonso IV of Portugal.

Ancestors of José E. Romero

4. José Maria Romero
2. Francisco Derecho Romero (Sr.)
5. Maria Ramona Derecho
1. José E. Romero
12. Antonio Muñoz
6. José Teves Muñoz
26. Vicente Anunciación Teves
13. Liberata Villamil Teves
27. Rufina Villamil
3. Josefa Calumpang Muñoz
28. Laureano de Calumpang Bracamonte
14. Leogardo Garcia Calumpang
29. Joaquina Llosa Garcia
7. Aleja Silva Calumpang
30. Gregorio Silva
15. Prudencia Torres Silva
31. Florentina Torres

== Later life and death ==
In 1961, Romero together with Supreme Court Justices Jose B.L. Reyes and Calixto Zaldivar, Central Bank Governor Miguel Cuaderno Sr., and Senator Salvador Z. Araneta founded the Philippine Constitution Association (PHILCONSA) to defend, preserve and protect the Constitution.

A longtime member of the Nacionalista Party, he ran for a seat in the senate during the 1961 Philippine Senate election but lost where all but two candidates of the Nacionalista ticket, Lorenzo S. Sumulong and Jose J. Roy, won. In 1970, he ran for a seat as delegate to the Constitutional Convention that year representing the first district of Negros Oriental but lost.

In 1973, Romero became president of Bel-Air Village Association, which manages Bel-Air Village, a gated community in Makati where he was a resident.

Romero died on 23 October 1978 in Manila, Philippines and is buried at the Manila North Cemetery.
