= Teves =

Teves may refer to

People

- Arnolfo Teves Jr., Filipino politician, former House of Representatives representative for Negros Oriental
- Margarito Teves, Filipino politician and former finance secretary.
- Miles Teves, Hollywood artist
- Phanie Teves, Filipino politician, Vice Mayor of Muntinlupa.
- Pryde Henry Teves, Filipino politician, former Negros Oriental governor.

Other

- Continental Teves, part of Continental AG of Germany
- TVes, a Venezuelan TV station (called "Teves" in some media)
- Tensor–vector–scalar gravity ("TeVeS"), relativistic generalization of Modified Newtonian dynamics
- Tevet, a month in the Hebrew calendar
