= Negros Oriental's at-large congressional district =

Legislative district of the Philippines

Negros Oriental's at-large congressional district was the provincewide electoral district that was used to elect members of Philippine national legislatures in Negros Oriental before 1987.

Negros Oriental first elected its representatives at-large in the 1943 Philippine legislative election for a seat in the National Assembly of the Second Philippine Republic. Before 1943, the province which also included the territory of present-day Siquijor province was represented in the national legislatures through its first and second districts. The province was also earlier represented in the Malolos Congress of the First Philippine Republic in 1898 by appointed delegates residing in Luzon.

The two districts were restored in Negros Oriental ahead of the 1941 Philippine House of Representatives elections whose elected representatives only began to serve following the dissolution of the Second Republic and the restoration of the Philippine Commonwealth in 1945. An at-large district would not be used in the province again until the 1984 Philippine parliamentary election for three seats in the Batasang Pambansa. It became obsolete following the 1987 reapportionment under a new constitution that divided Negros Oriental into three congressional districts.

== Representation history ==
#	Term of office		National Assembly	Seat A				Seat B				Seat C			
#	Start	End	National Assembly	Image	Member	Party	Electoral history	Image	Member	Party	Electoral history	Image	Member	Party	Electoral history
=== Negros Oriental's at-large district for the Malolos Congress ===
District created June 18, 1898.
–	September 15, 1898	March 23, 1901	1st		Mariano Oriola	Independent	Appointed.		Pío del Pilar	Independent	Appointed.		Luciano San Miguel	Independent	Appointed.
#	Term of office		National Assembly	Seat A				Seat B				Seats eliminated			
#	Start	End	National Assembly	Image	Member	Party	Electoral history	Image	Member	Party	Electoral history	Seats eliminated			
=== Negros Oriental's at-large district for the National Assembly (Second Philippine Republic) ===												Seats eliminated			
District re-created September 7, 1943.												Seats eliminated			
–	September 25, 1943	February 2, 1944	1st		Julián L. Teves	KALIBAPI	Elected in 1943.		Guillermo Z. Villanueva	KALIBAPI	Appointed as an ex officio member.	Seats eliminated			
District dissolved into Negros Oriental's 1st and 2nd districts.												Seats eliminated			
#	Term of office		Batasang Pambansa	Seat A				Seat B				Seat C			
#	Start	End	Batasang Pambansa	Image	Member	Party	Electoral history	Image	Member	Party	Electoral history	Image	Member	Party	Electoral history
=== Negros Oriental's at-large district for the Regular Batasang Pambansa ===
District re-created February 1, 1984.
–	July 23, 1984	March 25, 1986	2nd		Ricardo D. Abiera	KBL	Elected in 1984.		Andres C. Bustamante	KBL	Elected in 1984.		Emilio Macias	KBL	Elected in 1984.
District dissolved into Negros Oriental's 1st, 2nd and 3rd districts.

== See also ==
- Legislative districts of Negros Oriental
