= Chaco Sagarbarria =

Filipino politician (born 1986)

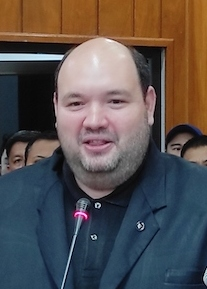
- Sagarbarria in 2023

Governor of Negros Oriental
- Incumbent
- Assumed office May 31, 2023
- Vice Governor: Jaime L. Reyes (2023–2025); Cezanne Fritz H. Diaz (2025–present)
- Preceded by: Carlo Jorge Joan L. Reyes

Vice Governor of Negros Oriental
- In office March 4, 2023 – May 31, 2023
- Governor: Carlo Jorge Joan L. Reyes
- Preceded by: Carlo Jorge Joan L. Reyes
- Succeeded by: Jaime L. Reyes

Member of the Negros Oriental Provincial Board from the 2nd district
- In office June 30, 2022 – March 4, 2023 Serving with Nyrth Christian Degamo, Woodrow Maquiling Sr. and Apolinario Arnaiz Jr.

Member of the Dumaguete City Council
- In office May 20, 2016 – May 30, 2022

Personal details
- Born: Manuel Longa Sagarbarria; May 18, 1986 (age 40) Dumaguete, Negros Oriental, Philippines
- Party: PFP (2024–present)
- Other political affiliations: NPC (2015–2024)
- Spouse: Farrah Mae D. Barot-Sagarbarria (d. 2022)
- Domestic partner: Juvi Calago (c. 2022–present)
- Children: 2
- Education: Silliman University
- Occupation: Politician
- Website: www.facebook.com/@BMChacoL.Sagarbarria/

Manuel "Chaco" Longa Sagarbarria (born May 18, 1986) is a Filipino politician who has served as the governor of Negros Oriental since 2023.

== Early life and education ==
Sagarbarria was born on May 18, 1986 to former Congressman of the 2nd District of Negros Oriental and incumbent Dumaguete Mayor, Manuel "Chiquiting" Teves Sagarbarria and former Barangay Captain, now incumbent 2nd district representative, Ma. Isabel “Maisa” Longa-Sagarbarria.

Sagarbarria graduated from Silliman University and earned an undergraduate degree.

== Political career ==
=== Early political career ===
Sagarbarria was elected SK Kagawad at a young age, and became Barangay Captain a few years after his election as Kagawad.

In 2016, Sagarbarria was elected as City Councilor of Dumaguete with 22,797 votes under the Nationalist People's Coalition, and was re-elected in 2019, with a larger vote share of 35,553 votes.

=== Sangguniang Panlalawigan and Vice Governor ===
In 2022, Sagarbarria was elected as Board Member of the Sangguniang Panlalawigan of Negros Oriental from the Second District, winning with 107,062 votes.

On March 4, 2023, Sagarbarria became the Vice Governor of Negros Oriental, succeeding the then-Vice Governor, Carlo Jorge Joan L. Reyes, who became Governor following the assassination of Governor Roel Degamo.

=== Governor of Negros Oriental ===
On May 31, 2023, Sagarbarria ascended to become Governor of Negros Oriental, following the death of his predecessor, Carlo Jorge Joan L. Reyes, who died from lung cancer while receiving treatment in Metro Manila. Sagarbarria took his oath as governor from Judge Gerardo Paguio Jr. on the same day. One of his first acts as Governor was to order the flying of the Philippine flags at half-mast in honor of the late Reyes.

As Governor, Sagarbarria vowed to prioritize the improvement of the Negros Oriental Provincial Hospital, and to continue the projects that were started by his late predecessor. Sagarbarria called for "unity and hard work" among medical personnel in the province to aide and provide the health needs of the province's residents, and also announced the establishment of a Bids and Awards Committee, specifically for medical centers to fast-track the procurement of equipment and medicines.

In June 2023, Sagarbarria implemented identical measures in handling the threats of African Swine Fever with Cebu Governor, Gwendolyn Garcia, wherein Sagarbarria said that the two provinces would sign a memorandum of agreement that would lay out the near-same protocols about biosecurity measures, as well as lifting the ban on hogs from Bureau of Animal Industry (BAI)-declared ASF-infected areas. In the same year, Sagarbarria also announced that he undertake more sporting events to intensify the provincial government’s tourism campaign. He disclosed in a separate interview that the capitol had spent about ₱50,000 the Macias Sports Center in Dumaguete.

In 2024, Sagarbarria signed Executive Order No. 10, which lifted the ban on pork in the province following the ban on hogs from the BAI. In the same year, he, along with other local leaders, also expressed his support of the proposal that would create a Negros island economic superhighway, saying that the proposed Negros island economic superhighway was designed to boost agriculture, trade, and business between the two Negros provinces, further adding that the project was agreed with Negros Occidental Governor, Eugenio “Bong” Lacson.

Sagarbarria also distributed checks and packages amounting to P910,000 in Sibulan, where 13 former New People's Army rebels and one Militia ng Bayan member each received ₱50,000 worth of livelihood assistance and ₱15,000 as immediate assistance under the Enhanced Comprehensive Local Integration Program (ECLIP).

He was elected on his own right as governor in the 2025 midterm elections with 365,020 votes, winning against former governor, Pryde Henry Teves.

== Personal life ==
Sagarbarria was married to Farrah Mae Barot-Sagarbarria until the latter's death in 2022 due to illness. They have two children together. Sagarbarria is currently in a relationship with Juvilin Calago, businesswoman and an Executive Administrative Assistant at the Provincial Government of Negros Oriental.

== Electoral history ==
Electoral history of Chaco Sagarbarria
Year	Office	Party	Votes received				Result
Year	Office	Party	Total	%	P.	Swing	Result
2016	Councilor of Dumaguete	NPC	22,797	—N/a	10th	—N/a	Won
2019	Councilor of Dumaguete	NPC	35,553	—N/a	2nd	—N/a	Won
2022	Board Member (Negros Oriental–2nd)	NPC	107,062	14.49%	1st	—N/a	Won
2025	Governor of Negros Oriental	PFP	365,020	52.41%	1st	—N/a	Won

Political offices
Preceded by Carlo Jorge Joan L. Reyes	Governor of Negros Oriental; 2023–present	Incumbent
Preceded by Carlo Jorge Joan L. Reyes	Vice Governor of Negros Oriental; 2023-2023	Succeeded by Jamie L. Reyes
