= Demetrio Larena =

The Most Excellent Demetrio Larena
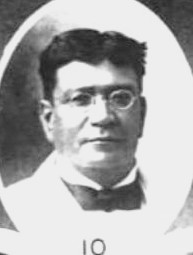
- Portrait as governor, published c. 1905, by the United States Bureau of the Census

Vice-President of the Republic of Negros
- In office November 5, 1898 – April 30, 1901
- Preceded by: (post made)
- Succeeded by: Antonio Jayme (as Civil Vice-Governor)

1st Governor of Negros Oriental
- In office 1901–1906
- Preceded by: (position last held by Antonio Ferrer, as Gobernadorcillo)
- Succeeded by: Hermenegildo Villanueva

Demetrio Larena was a political hero and former governor of Negros Oriental (East Negros), a province on Negros Island in the Philippines. He was born in November 5, 1898 in Dumaguete, Negros Oriental and is the son of Don Agustín de Sandes who is a Spaniard from Málaga, Spain and Doña Versamina Larena, he is the brother of Melitón Larena who was a Filipino politician and the first municipal president of Dumaguete.

Demetrio Larena was the vice-president of the Republic of Negros and eventually the governor of Negros Oriental from 1901 until 1906. Larena was instrumental in the establishment of Silliman University in Dumaguete. When Dr. David Hibbard came to the Philippines to scout for a good location of the school that the Presbyterian Board of Foreign Missions wanted to be founded, Dumaguete was not one of the places originally contemplated. The places that were considered as prospects for the school's location were Iloilo, Cebu and Zamboanga. But due in part to Larena's accommodating gesture and Dumaguete's natural environment at that time, Hibbard decided that the best place to establish the school would be in Dumaguete.
