= Governor of Negros Oriental =

Local chief executive

Governor of Oriental Negros
- Gobernador sa Sidlakang Negros; Gobernador de Negros Oriental
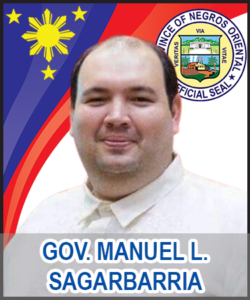
- Incumbent; Manuel Sagarbarría y Longa since May 31, 2023
- Style: The Right Honourable; His Excellency (formerly, Spanish era)
- Seat: Oriental Negros Provincial Capitol, Dumaguete
- Term length: 3 years
- Inaugural holder: Pedro de Alcaráz (de facto, as Corregidor of Negros Island); Joaquin Pardo de Tavera (de jure, as appointed Governor of Negros Oriental)
- Formation: 1625
- Deputy: Vice-Governor (formerly called Lt. Governor)
- Website: Oriental Negros Provincial Government

The Governor of Oriental Negros is the local chief executive and head of the Provincial Government of Negros Oriental. Along with the Governor of Negros Occidental, the governor of Siquijor, and the Mayor of the highly urbanized city of Bacolod, he sits as one of the chief executives of the Negros Island Region.

== Formation ==
Before the establishment of the Republic, the position had been occupied by appointed Spanish military commanders that also serve the role of Governor since the transfer of the capital to Bacolod in 1849. Previously, the local chief executive post was vested on the "Corregidor," or the commander of the military outpost, in the two previous capitals of Ilog, Negros Occidental and Himamaylan. When the island was divided into two provinces, the Military Governor designated Dumaguete as the provincial capital.

After the Negros Revolution, all provincial authority divested on the Office of the President and Vice President, representing Negros Occidental and Negros Oriental. Americans occupied the fledgling republic and requested the provisional government to conduct an island-wide election for the gubernatorial post. Melecio Severino of Silay emerged as the first elected governor for the whole island. But upon the dissolution of the republic, Demetrio Larena, the former Vice-President of the Republic of Negros was appointed Governor.

== Duties and related offices ==
By the convention set for the newly created Negros Island Region, the Governor of Negros Oriental sits as chairperson of one of the two regional councils, namely the Regional Development Council and the Regional Peace and Order Council.

== List of governors ==
=== Spanish governors of Negros province ===
From the formal establishment of the military outpost in the pueblo of Ilog until the promulgation of a royal decree dividing the island into Negros Occidental and Negros Oriental on October 25, 1889, Negros Island was governed as a single province starting from being under the jurisdiction of Oton, Iloilo until it established its capitals in Ilog (1734), Himamaylan (1795) and Bacolod (1849).

Order	Name	Year in office	Title	Capital	Governor-General
1	Pedro de Alcaraz	1625-1627	Corregidor	Ilog (de facto); Administered from Arevalo	Fernándo de Silva
2	Jerónimo Venegas	1627-1629	Corregidor	Ilog (de facto); Administered from Arevalo	Juan Niño de Tabora
3	Juan de León	1629-1631	Corregidor	Ilog (de facto); Administered from Arevalo	Juan Niño de Tabora
--	--	1631-1652	Direct administration by the Alcalde Mayor of Iloilo	Ilog (de facto); Administered from Arevalo	Juan Niño de Tabora; Lorenzo de Olaza; Juan Cerezo de Salamanca; Sebastián Hurtado de Corcuera; Diego Fajardo Chacón
4	Juan Ferrer	1652-1666	Corregidor	Ilog (de facto); Administered from Arevalo	Diego Fajardo Chacón; Sabiniano Manrique de Lara; Diego de Salcedo
5	Pedro de Tortosa	1666-1668	Corregidor	Ilog (de facto); Administered from Arevalo	Diego de Salcedo
6	Jacinto Rivera	1668-1669	Corregidor	Ilog (de facto); Administered from Arevalo	Juan Manuel de la Peña Bonifaz
7	Nicolas Jurado	1669-1671	Corregidor	Ilog (de facto); Administered from Arevalo	Manuel de León
8	Agustin Martínez	1671-1673	Corregidor	Ilog (de facto); Administered from Arevalo	Manuel de León
--	--	1673-1699	Direct administration by the Alcalde Mayor of Iloilo	Ilog (de facto); Administered from Arevalo	Manuel de León; Francisco Coloma; Francisco Sotomayor y Mansilla; Juan de Vargas y Hurtado; Gabriel de Curuzealegui y Arriola; Alonso de Avila Fuertes; Fausto Cruzat y Gongora
9	Francisco Tabares	1699-1701	Corregidor	Ilog (de facto); Administered from Arevalo	Fausto Cruzat y Gongora
10	Ramon Díaz Ruizbobo	1701-1703	Corregidor	Ilog (de facto); Administered from Arevalo	Domingo Zabálburu de Echevarri
11	Felix de Cabrera	1703-1705	Corregidor	Ilog (de facto); Administered from Arevalo	Domingo Zabálburu de Echevarri
--	--	1705-1709	Direct administration by the Alcalde Mayor of Iloilo	Ilog (de facto); Administered from Arevalo	Domingo Zabálburu de Echevarri
12	Francisco de Figueroa	1709-1711	Corregidor	Ilog (de facto); Administered from Arevalo	Martín de Urzúa y Arizmendi
13	Bartolome Gallardo	1711-1714	Corregidor	Ilog (de facto); Administered from Arevalo	Martín de Urzúa y Arizmendi
14	Ricardo Ricarte	1714- 1716	Corregidor	Ilog (de facto); Administered from Arevalo	Martín de Urzúa y Arizmendi; José Torralba
15	Juan Bautista de Sameta	1716-1718	Corregidor	Ilog (de facto); Administered from Arevalo	Fernando Manuel de Bustillo Bustamante y Rueda
--	--	1718-1719	Direct administration by the Alcalde Mayor of Iloilo	Ilog (de facto); Administered from Arevalo	Fernando Manuel de Bustillo Bustamante y Rueda
16	Fernando de Rojas y Mendoza	1719-1721	Corregidor	Ilog (de facto); Administered from Arevalo	Francisco de la Cuesta
17	--	1721-1779	Direct administration by the Alcalde Mayor of Iloilo	Ilog (de jure); Administered from Arevalo	Francisco de la Cuesta; Toribio José Cosio y Campo; Fernándo Valdés y Tamon; Gaspar de la Torre; Juan Arrechederra; Francisco José de Ovando; Pedro Manuel de Arandía Santisteban; Miguel Lino de Ezpeleta; Manuel Rojo del Río y Vieyra; Simón de Anda y Salazar(first); Dawsonne Drake (British Occupation); Francisco Javier de la Torre; José Antonio Raón y Gutiérrez; Simón de Anda y Salazar(second); Pedro de Sarrio; José Basco y Vargas
18	Felipe de Zúñiga	1779-1785 (first); 1789-1790 (second)	Corregidor	Ilog	José Basco y Vargas
19	Mariano Escote	1785-1787	Corregidor	Ilog	José Basco y Vargas
20	Vicente Escote	1787-1789	Corregidor	Ilog	Pedro de Sarrio; Félix Berenguer de Marquina
22	Jose de Arriola	1790- 1793	Corregidor	Ilog	Félix Berenguer de Marquina
23	Ramón de Zúñiga	1793-1799	Corregidor	Himamaylan	Rafael María de Aguilar y Ponce de León
24	Jose Casteu	1799-1803	Corregidor	Himamaylan	Rafael María de Aguilar y Ponce de León
25	Simón Matías de Rojas	1803-1806	Corregidor	Himamaylan	Rafael María de Aguilar y Ponce de León
26	Carlos Casares	1806-1810	Corregidor	Himamaylan	Mariano Fernández de Folgueras
27	Ciriaco Lladoc	1810-1814 (first); 1818-1821 (second)	Corregidor	Himamaylan	Manuel Gonzalez de Aguilar(first); Mariano Fernández de Folgueras(second)
28	Jose Maria de Torres	1814-1818	Corregidor	Himamaylan	José Gardoqui Jaraveitia
30	Fernando Cuervo	1821-1824	Corregidor	Himamaylan	Mariano Fernández de Folgueras; Juan Antonio Martínez
31	Camilo Peña García	1824-1827	Corregidor	Himamaylan	Juan Antonio Martínez; Mariano Ricafort Palacín y Abarca
--	--	1827-1829	Direct administration by the Spanish Governor of Iloilo	Himamaylan	Mariano Ricafort Palacín y Abarca
32	Juan de Córdova	1829-1833	Corregidor	Himamaylan	Mariano Ricafort Palacín y Abarca; Pasqual Enrile y Alcedo
33	Luis Villasís	1833-1839	Corregidor	Himamaylan	Pasqual Enrile y Alcedo; Gabriel de Torres; Joaquín de Crámer; Pedro Antonio Salazar Castillo y Varona; Andrés García Camba; Luis Lardizábal
34	Mariano Valero Soto	1839- 1842	Alcalde Mayor	Himamaylan	Luis Lardizábal; Marcelino de Oraá Lecumberri
35	Jose Sáenz de Vizmanos	1842- 1848	Alcalde Mayor	Himamaylan	Marcelino de Oraá Lecumberri; Francisco de Paula Alcalá de la Torre; Narciso Clavería
36	Manuel Valdivieso Morquecho	1848-1854	Alcalde Mayor	Bacolod	Narciso Clavería; Antonio María Blanco; Antonio de Urbistondo y Eguía; Ramón Montero y Blandino; Manuel Pavía; Ramón Montero y Blandino; Manuel Crespo y Cebrían
37	José Luis Ceacero Inguanzo	1854-1855	Gobernador Politico-Militar	Bacolod	Manuel Crespo y Cebrían; Ramón Montero y Blandino
38	Emilio Saravia	1855-1857	Gobernador Politico-Militar	Bacolod	Manuel Crespo y Cebrían; Ramón Montero y Blandino
39	Pedro de Beaumont	1857-1860	Gobernador Politico-Militar	Bacolod	Fernándo Norzagaray y Escudero
40	Beremundo Aranda	1860-1864	Gobernador Politico-Militar	Bacolod	Ramón María Solano y Llanderal; Juan Herrera Dávila; José Lemery e Ibarrola Ney y González; Salvador Valdés; Rafaél de Echagüe y Bermingham
41	Jose de Cramé	1864-1865	Gobernador Politico-Militar	Bacolod	Rafaél de Echagüe y Bermingham
42	Joaquin Vidal	1865- 1866	Gobernador Politico-Militar	Bacolod	Joaquín del Solar e Ibáñez (first); Juan de Lara e Irigoyen
43	Juan Gil Montes	1866-1867	Gobernador Politico-Militar	Bacolod	José Laureano de Sanz y Posse; Juan Antonio Osorio; Joaquín del Solar e Ibáñez(second); José de la Gándara y Navarro
44	Antonio Vázquez Cuenca	1867	Gobernador Politico-Militar (Interim)	Bacolod	José de la Gándara y Navarro
45	Eugenio Serrano	1867-1868	Gobernador Politico-Militar	Bacolod	José de la Gándara y Navarro
46	Enrique Fajardo	1868-1869	Gobernador Politico-Militar	Bacolod	José de la Gándara y Navarro
47	Francisco Jáudenes	1869- 1871	Gobernador Politico-Militar	Bacolod	Manuel Maldonado (Republican Governor General); Carlos María de la Torre y Navacerrada (Republican Governor General)
48	Domingo García	1871-1873	Gobernador Politico-Militar	Bacolod	Rafael de Izquierdo y Gutíerrez
49	Miguel Masgrao	1873	Gobernador Politico-Militar (Interim)	Bacolod	Rafael de Izquierdo y Gutíerrez
50	Federico Lemeyer	1873-1875	Gobernador Politico-Militar	Bacolod	Juan Alaminos y Vivar; Manuel Blanco Valderrama; José Malcampo y Monje
51	Román Pastor	1875-1877	Gobernador Politico-Militar	Bacolod	José Malcampo y Monje
52	Juan Blake	1877-1878	Gobernador Politico-Militar	Bacolod	Domingo Moriones y Murillo
53	Ramon Estevánez	1878-1883	Gobernador Politico-Militar	Bacolod	Domingo Moriones y Murillo; Rafael Rodríguez Arias; Fernando Primo de Rivera
54	Eduardo Subinza	1883-1885	Gobernador Politico-Militar	Bacolod	Emilio Molíns; Joaquín Jovellar
55	Antonio Tovar y Marcoleta, comandante de infantería	1885-1889	Gobernador Politico-Militar	Bacolod	Emilio Terrero y Perinat
56	Fernando Giralt	1889-1890	Gobernador Politico-Militar	Bacolod	Emilio Terrero y Perinat; Antonio Moltó; Federico Lobatón; Valeriano Wéyler

=== Spanish governors of Negros Oriental ===
Governor General Valeriano Wéyler promulgated a royal decree in October 25, 1889, which divided the island into two provinces, namely Negros Occidental and Negros Oriental, upon the request of the 13 Augustinian Recollect friars administering the towns east of the island. Bacolod was retained as the capital of Negros Occidental.

Order	Name	Year in office	Title	Capital	Governor-General
1 (57)	Joaquin Pardo de Tavera	1890-1891	Gobernador Politico-Militar	Dumaguete	Valeriano Wéyler
2 (58)	Luis de la Torre	1891-1892	Gobernador Politico-Militar	Dumaguete	Eulogio Despujol
3 (59)	T. Gutiérrez de la Vega	1892-1892	Gobernador Politico-Militar	Dumaguete	Eulogio Despujol
4 (60)	Victor Espada	1892-1894	Gobernador Politico-Militar	Dumaguete	Eulogio Despujol; Federico Ochando; Ramón Blanco, 1st Marquis of Peña Plata
5 (61)	Adolfo Asuncion	1894-1895	Gobernador Politico-Militar	Dumaguete	Ramón Blanco, 1st Marquis of Peña Plata; Camilo de Polavieja
6 (62)	Emilio Regaler	1895-1897	Gobernador Politico-Militar	Dumaguete	José de Lachambre; Fernando Primo de Rivera
7 (63)	Antonio Ferrer	1897-1898	Gobernador Politico-Militar	Dumaguete	Fernando Primo de Rivera; Basilio Augustín; Fermín Jáudenes; Francisco Rizzo; Diego de los Ríos

=== Revolutionary government ===
Negros Island was briefly unified temporarily upon the assumption of the Revolutionary Government in Bacolod. An election for separate provincial officials was planned but not implemented until 1901, under the American protectorate period of the Republic of Negros.

Order	Name	Year in office	Title	Capital	President
1	General Juan Araneta	November 6, 1898 – November 27, 1898	Gobernador Militar (Acting, as Secretary of War)	Bacolod	General Aniceto Lacson
2	Simeon Lizares	November 27, 1898 – December 1, 1899	Gobernador Civil (Acting, as Secretary of the Interior)	Bacolod	General Aniceto Lacson
3 (64)	Melecio Severino	December 1, 1899 – April 30, 1901	Governor-General of Negros Island	Bacolod	General Aniceto Lacson

=== Philippine governors ===
This list includes governors appointed or elected since the end of Spanish rule, the recognized start of the institutional office.

Order	Image	Name	Year in office	Era
1 (65)		Demetrio Larena de Sande	1901-1906	American Occupation, appointed
2 (66)		Hermenegildo Villanueva y Teves	1907-1911	American Occupation
3 (67)		Juan Montenegro y Trasmonte	1911-1912	American Occupation
4 (68)		Felipe Tay-ko	1912-1916	American Occupation
5 (69)		Enrique Cayetano Villanueva y Teves	1916-1925	American Occupation
6 (70)		José Benito Atilano Joaquín Villegas y Teves	1925-1931	American Occupation
7 (71)		Hermenegildo Villanueva y Teves	1931-1935	American Occupation
8 (72)		Julian Manuel Teves y Lajato	1935-1941	Commonwealth Government
9 (73)		Guillermo Zósimo Villanueva y Teves	1941-1945	Japanese Occupation (later executed)
10 (74)		Alfredo Montelibano, Sr.	1942-1945	Commonwealth Government (In Exile) (as Military Governor of Negros and Siquijor Islands)
11 (75)		Lorenzo Teves y Guivelondo	1944-1945	Commonwealth Government (as Military Governor)
12 (76)		Alberto Furbeyre y Villachica	1945-1946	Commonwealth Government
13 (77)		Práxedes Villanueva y Teves	1946-1951	Third Republic
14 (78)		Pedro Bandoquillo	1951-1955	Third Republic
15 (79)		Serafin Miguel Teves y Lajato	1956-1959	Third Republic
16 (80)		Mariano Francisco Perdices y Bernad, KSS	1959-1972	Third Republic
17 (81)		William Zacarías Villegas y Villanueva	1972-1978	Fourth Republic
18 (82)		Lorenzo Teves y Guivelondo	1978-1986	Fourth Republic; Fifth Republic
–		Ramón George Washington Romero y Sarabia (ad interim)	1980	Fourth Republic
–		Herminio Teves y Guivelondo (officer-in-charge, EDSA Pioneers)	1986-1987	Fifth Republic
19 (83)		Emilio Macías y Cabrera, II, MD	1987–1998	Fifth Republic
20 (84)		George Arnáiz y Planto	1998–2007	Fifth Republic
21 (85)		Emilio Macías y Cabrera, II, MD	June 30, 2007 – June 13, 2010 (died in office)	Fifth Republic
–		Jose A. Baldado (ad interim)	June 18, 2010 – June 30, 2010	Fifth Republic
22 (86)		Agustín Ramón Perdices y Miciano	June 30, 2010 – January 5, 2011 (died in office)	Fifth Republic
23 (87)		Roel R. Degamo	January 5, 2011 – June 30, 2022	Fifth Republic
–		Edward Mark Macías y López (ad interim)	October 18, 2017 – January 17, 2018	Fifth Republic
24 (88)		Pryde Henry A. Teves	June 30, 2022 – October 11, 2022 (Note: Roel R. Degamo took his oath as governor before President Bongbong Marcos on October 5, 2022. Meanwhile, Pryde Henry A. Teves voluntarily relinquished the governorship on October 11.) (nullified by the Supreme Court)	Fifth Republic
25 (89)		Roel R. Degamo	October 5, 2022 – March 4, 2023 (assassinated)	Fifth Republic
26 (90)		Carlo Jorge Joan L. Reyes	March 4, 2023 – May 31, 2023 (died in office)	Fifth Republic
27 (91)		Manuel "Chaco" Sagarbarría y Longa	June 1, 2023 – present	Fifth Republic
