= Canlaon =

Component city in Negros Oriental, Philippines

- Component city
- City of Canlaon
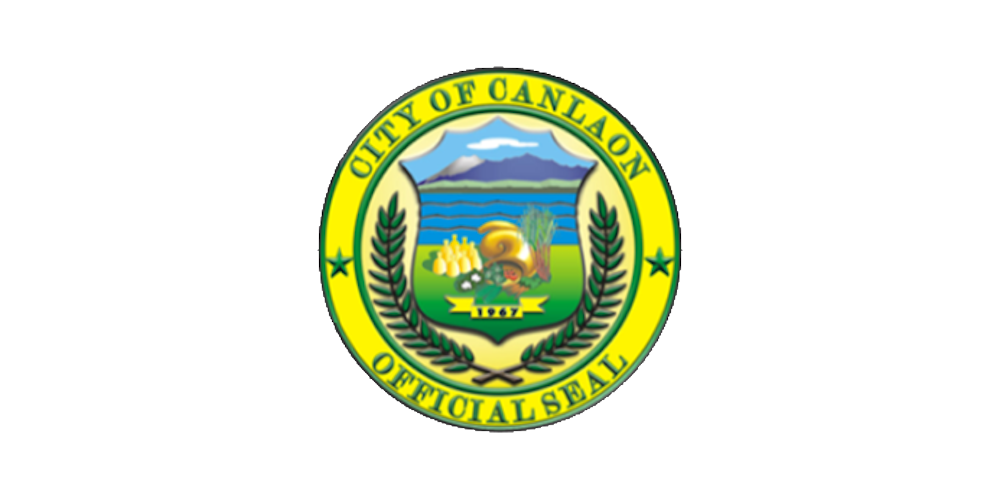
- Flag Seal
- Nicknames: The Vegetable Capital of Negros Island, The Summer Capital of Negros Oriental
- Motto: Salta Canlaon
- Anthem: "Canlaon, Pinangga kong Dakbayan"
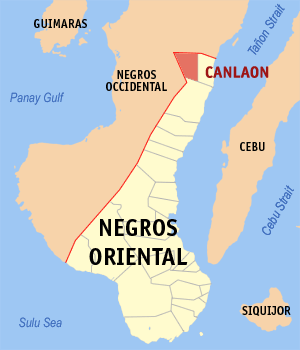
- Map of Negros Oriental with Canlaon highlighted
- Interactive map of Canlaon
- Location within the Philippines
- Coordinates: 10°23′N 123°12′E
- Country: Philippines
- Region: Negros Island Region
- Province: Negros Oriental
- District: 1st district
- Founded: October 11, 1946
- Cityhood: July 2, 1967
- Named for: Kanlaon volcano
- Barangays: 12 (see Barangays)

Government
  - Type: Sangguniang Panlungsod
  - Mayor: Jose Chubasco B. Cardenas
  - Vice Mayor: Siegfredo B. Cardenas (NPC)
  - Representative: Emmanuel L. Iway (PFP)
  - City Council: Members: Jane Francis J. Cardenas; Alfonso W. Tadifa, Jr.; Roderick John B. Schon; Aldin L. Avila; Charisse C. Cardenas; Ricky R. Delubio; Diego A. Santiago II; Jan Monic M. Soliva; Clementino B. Llanes; John Alce L. Jimenez; Janvie B. Endrina ^{◌}; ◌ ex officio SK chairman
  - Electorate: 37,690 voters (2025)

Area
  - Total: 170.93 km^{2} (66.00 sq mi)
- Elevation: 500 m (1,600 ft)
- Highest elevation: 2,443 m (8,015 ft)
- Lowest elevation: 0 m (0 ft)

Population (2024 census)
  - Total: 62,785
  - Density: 367.31/km^{2} (951.34/sq mi)
  - Households: 14,210

Economy
  - Income class: 4th city income class
  - Poverty incidence: 36.25% (2023)
  - Revenue: ₱ 704.7 million (2023)
  - Assets: ₱ 1,949 million (2023)
  - Expenditure: ₱ 550.7 million (2023)
  - Liabilities: ₱ 108 million (2023)

Service provider
  - Electricity: Negros Oriental 1 Electric Cooperative (NORECO 1)
- Time zone: UTC+8 (PST)
- ZIP code: 6223
- PSGC: 074608000
- IDD : area code: +63 (0)35
- Native languages: Cebuano; Hiligaynon; Tagalog
- Website: canlaoncity.gov.ph

Canlaon, officially the City of Canlaon (Cebuano: Dakbayan sa Canlaon; Hiligaynon: Dakbanwa sang Canlaon; Filipino: Lungsod ng Canlaon), is a component city in the province of Negros Oriental, Philippines. According to the 2024 census, it has a population of 62,785 people.

== Etymology ==
The city is named after the nearby Kanlaon Volcano. The name "Kanlaon" means "[place] of Laon", a pre-colonial Visayan goddess of creation, agriculture, and justice. The name Laon itself means "the ancient one", from Visayan laon meaning "ancient" or "old."

== History ==
Canlaon was formerly a part of Vallehermoso as Sitio Mabigo of Barrio Panubigan. In 1941, Isidoro Bautista Sr., a geodetic engineer, along with its residents petitioned the Philippine government to convert Mabigo into a separate municipality.

=== World War II ===
During the Second World War, the Japanese Imperial Army captured Canlaon on April 10, 1942, right after the Battle of Bataan. The occupation ended in early 1945 when soldiers from the Eighth United States Army under Lieutenant General Robert Eichelberger including the 40th Infantry Division (United States) and the 23rd Infantry Division (United States), landed in Negros Island to drive out the Japanese. On liberating the island, they were assisted by newly formed Philippine Commonwealth Military Forces and Negrense guerillas who helped in clearing out Japanese pockets of resistance throughout the island. In fact, the honor of liberating Canlaon from the Japanese went to Commonwealth soldiers belonging to the 7th, 71st, 73rd and 75th Infantry Regiments of the Philippine Army, the 7th Regiment of the Philippine Constabulary and the guerillas.

=== Post-World War II ===
==== Creation as a municipality ====
On October 11, 1946, President Manuel Roxas signed Executive Order no. 19, creating the municipality of Canlaon out of two barrios (Mabigo and Panubigan) and nine sitios. It was inaugurated on January 1, 1947. Isidoro Bautista Sr. became its first municipal mayor.

==== Cityhood ====
Lorenzo Teves, then congressman of the first district of Negros Oriental, filed House Bill 4346 to convert Canlaon into a city. The bill was approved and became Republic Act 3445. However, then President Carlos P. Garcia did not sign the bill. It was only on April 20, 1967, when president Ferdinand Marcos signed Proclamation no. 193, formally converting the municipality to a city. It took effect on July 2, 1967, making Canlaon the second city in the province after Dumaguete.

== Official Website ==
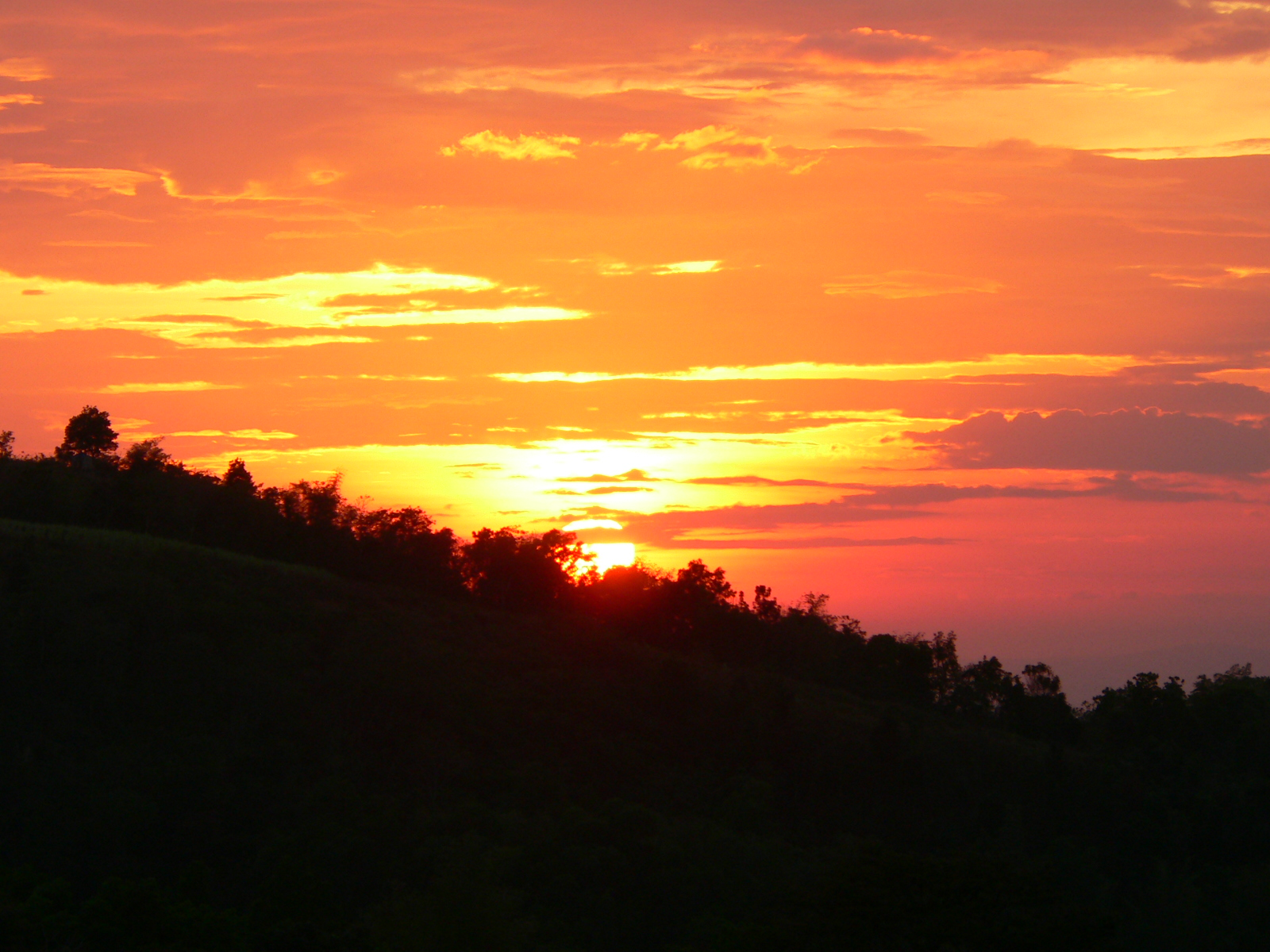
Sunset taken at Kanlaon Volcano's slope

canlaoncity.gov.ph

== Geography ==
Canlaon is 166 kilometres (103 mi) from the provincial capital Dumaguete and 94 kilometres (58 mi) from Bacolod, the capital of Negros Occidental. Canlaon is home to the highest peak in its own province, its corresponding island, and the entire Visayas, Mount Kanlaon, which is 2,465 metres (8,087 ft) above sea level at its highest point.

=== Flora ===
The Balete Tree (also known as the Century Tree) inside the OISCA Farm is estimated by botanists from Silliman University to be around 1,300 years old. It is home to lizards, bats, and a variety of insects.

=== Barangays ===
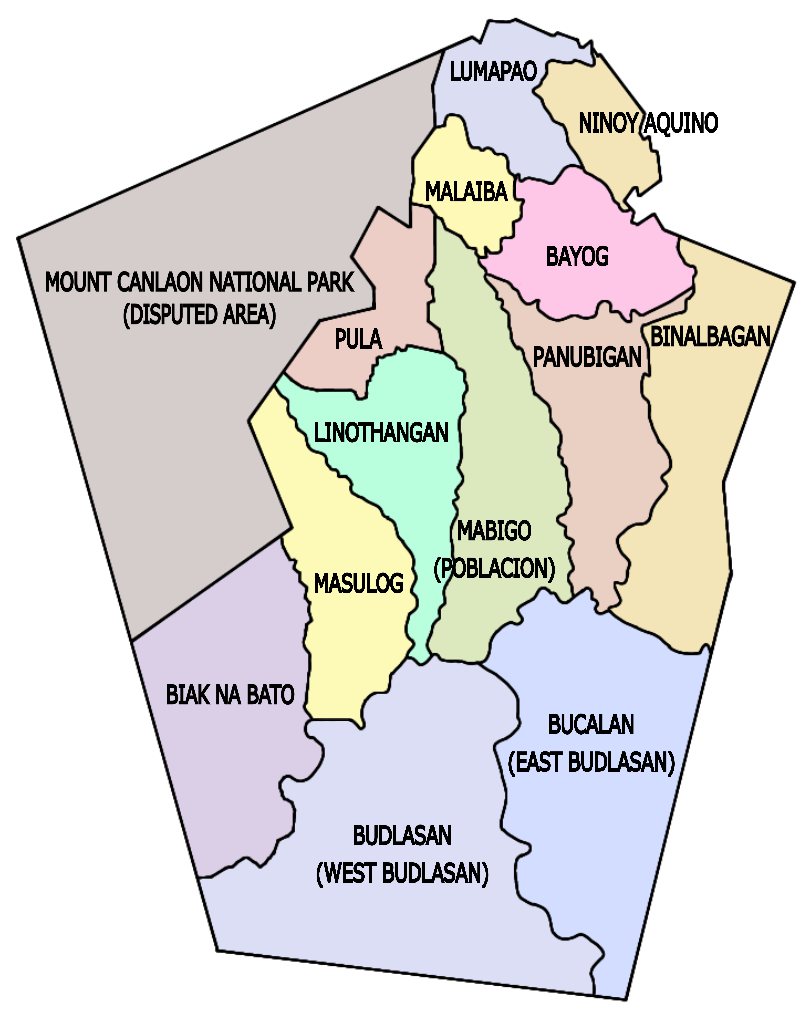
Administrative divisions of Canlaon City

Canlaon is politically subdivided into 12 barangays. Each barangay consists of puroks and some have sitios.

PSGC	Barangay	Population			±% p.a.	
		2024		2010		
074608001	Bayog	4.7%	2,938	2,663	▴	0.68%
074608002	Binalbagan	4.1%	2,569	2,109	▴	1.38%
074608003	Bucalan	5.2%	3,259	3,187	▴	0.15%
074608011	Budlasan	7.3%	4,553	3,768	▴	1.32%
074608004	Linothangan	6.5%	4,080	3,406	▴	1.26%
074608005	Lumapao	5.5%	3,447	2,680	▴	1.76%
074608009	Mabigo (Pob.)	19.8%	12,406	11,356	▴	0.61%
074608006	Malaiba	7.9%	4,973	3,956	▴	1.60%
074608007	Masulog	9.6%	6,016	5,200	▴	1.01%
074608012	Ninoy Aquino	3.6%	2,245	1,674	▴	2.05%
074608008	Panubigan	12.2%	7,681	6,109	▴	1.60%
074608010	Pula	7.4%	4,655	4,519	▴	0.21%
	Total		62,785	50,627	▴	1.50%

=== Climate ===
Climate data for Canlaon, Negros Oriental
Month	Jan	Feb	Mar	Apr	May	Jun	Jul	Aug	Sep	Oct	Nov	Dec	Year
Mean daily maximum °C (°F)	26 (79)	27 (81)	28 (82)	29 (84)	28 (82)	27 (81)	26 (79)	27 (81)	27 (81)	26 (79)	26 (79)	26 (79)	27 (81)
Mean daily minimum °C (°F)	20 (68)	20 (68)	20 (68)	21 (70)	22 (72)	22 (72)	22 (72)	22 (72)	22 (72)	22 (72)	21 (70)	20 (68)	21 (70)
Average precipitation mm (inches)	100 (3.9)	75 (3.0)	90 (3.5)	101 (4.0)	183 (7.2)	242 (9.5)	215 (8.5)	198 (7.8)	205 (8.1)	238 (9.4)	194 (7.6)	138 (5.4)	1,979 (77.9)
Average rainy days	14.9	11.3	14.5	17.4	26.4	28.4	28.5	27.5	26.9	28.4	24.2	17.2	265.6
Source: Meteoblue (Use with caution: this is modeled/calculated data, not measured locally.)

== Demographics ==
Population census of Canlaon
Year	Pop.	±% p.a.
1948	15,874	—
1960	22,884	+3.09%
1970	23,598	+0.31%
1975	29,152	+4.33%
1980	28,785	−0.25%
1990	37,165	+2.59%
1995	41,334	+2.01%
2000	46,548	+2.58%
2007	50,208	+1.05%
2010	50,627	+0.30%
2015	54,509	+1.42%
2020	58,822	+1.62%
2024	62,785	+1.58%
Source: Philippine Statistics Authority

=== Language ===
Cebuano is primarily spoken in Canlaon but Hiligaynon is also used as the city borders Negros Occidental. Tagalog and English are used as second languages.

== Economy ==
Poverty incidence of Canlaon (%)

Source: Philippine Statistics Authority

== Education ==
The public schools in Canlaon are administered by the newly formed Schools Division of Canlaon City.

Elementary schools:

- Angas 1 Elementary School — Sitio Angas 1, Mabigo
- Aquino Elementary School — Ninoy Aquino
- Bayog Elementary School — Bayog
- Binalbagan Elementary School — Binalbagan
- Bucalan Elementary School — Bucalan
- Budlasan Elementary School — Budlasan
- Concepcion Palmares-Montealegre Elementary School (formerly Mananawin ES) — Sitio Mananawin, Masulog
- Gaboc Elementary School — Sitio Gaboc, Malaiba
- Guibawan Elementary School — Sitio Guibawan, Bucalan
- Kalubihan Elementary School — Sitio Kalubihan, Linothangan
- Linothangan Elementary School — Linothangan
- Lower Lumapao Elementary School — Lumapao
- Macario Española Memorial School — Lopez Jaena Street, Mabigo
- Malaiba Elementary School — Malaiba
- Malaiba ES - Everlasting Extension — Purok Everlasting, Malaiba
- Manggapa Elementary School — Sitio Manggapa, Masulog
- Masulog Elementary School — Masulog
- Matagbak Elementary School — Sitio Matagbak, Masulog
- Minabuntod Elementary School — Sitio Minabuntod, Pula
- Panubigan Central Elementary School — Panubigan
- Panubigan CES - Carmen Extension — Sitio Carmen, Panubigan
- Panubigan CES - Pasto Extension — Sitio Pasto, Panubigan
- Pinamentigan Elementary School — Sitio Pinamentigan, Budlasan
- Pula Elementary School — Pula
- Tabalogo Elementary School — Sitio Tabalogo, Budlasan
- Tigbahi Elementary School — Sitio Tigbahi, Bayog
- Upper Lumapao Elementary School — Lumapao
- Villa Iowa Elementary School — Sitio Villa Iowa, Pula
- Villa Iowa ES - Humayan Extension — Sitio Humayan, Pula

High schools:

- Aquino High School (formerly Jose B. Cardenas MHS - Aquino Extension) — Ninoy Aquino
- Bayog High School (formerly Jose B. Cardenas MHS - Bayog Extension) — Bayog
- Bucalan High School — Bucalan
- Budlasan National High School — Sitio Pinamentigan, Budlasan
- Jose B. Cardenas Memorial High School — Exodus Avenue, Panubigan
- Jose B. Cardenas MHS - Tabalogo Extension — Sitio Tabalogo, Budlasan
- Jose B. Cardenas MHS - Uptown Annex — Uptown, Mabigo
- Malaiba High School — Malaiba
- Masulog High School — Masulog
- Pula High School (formerly Jose B. Cardenas MHS - Pula Extension) — Pula
