= Herminio Teves =

Filipino politician (1920–2019)

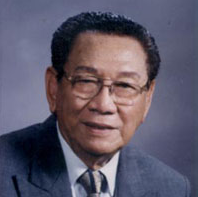
- Official portrait, 2001

Member of the House of Representatives from the Negros Oriental
- In office June 30, 1998 – June 30, 2007
- Preceded by: Margarito Teves
- Succeeded by: Pryde Henry Teves
- Constituency: 3rd District
- In office December 30, 1969 – September 23, 1972
- Preceded by: Lorenzo Teves
- Succeeded by: District abolished (Next held by Jerome Paras)
- Constituency: 1st District

Governor of Negros Oriental
- In office 1986–1987
- Preceded by: Lorenzo Teves
- Succeeded by: Emilio Macias

Personal details
- Born: Herminio Teves y Guivelondo; April 25, 1920 Valencia, Negros Oriental, Philippine Islands
- Died: May 15, 2019 (aged 99) Dumaguete City, Negros Oriental, Philippines
- Spouse(s): Narcisa Bustalino (first wife); Victoria Villamor (second wife)
- Relations: Lorenzo Teves (brother); Arnie Teves (grandson); Pryde Henry Teves (grandson)
- Children: 8, including Margarito
- Education: Philippine Nautical School
- Occupation: Politician

Herminio “Meniong” Guivelondo Teves (25 April 1920 – 15 May 2019) was a Filipino politician, businessman and legislator from Negros Oriental.

== Early life and education ==
Herminio Guivelondo Teves was born to Margarito Teves y Pinili (of Dumaguete and Toloñg) and Francisca Guivelondo y Serna (of Cebu) on April 25, 1920, in Nueva Valencia, Negros Oriental.

He first wed Narcisa “Sisay” Bustalino y Enrera, and they had three children: Margarito, born in 1943; Pamela, born in 1945; and Virginia, born in 1946. Narcisa died in 1949 due to cancer. He then wed, Teves married Victoria “Toring” Villamor, Narcisa's cousin, and they had five children.

Teves completed his elementary and high school education at Negros Oriental High School and graduated with a degree in maritime transportation with a specialization in nautical studies from the Philippine Nautical School.

== Career ==
Before entering public service, he was the president of Unitrade, Inc. in Dumaguete City, and a director of Toloñg Sugar Milling Company in Santa Catalina, Negros Oriental. He also established and managed Tayasan Agricultural Farm in Tayasan, Negros Oriental, and San Antonio Cattle Ranch in San Antonio, Sibulan, Negros Oriental.

At the age of 49, Teves became the Representative (Mambabatas Pambansa) for the first district of Negros Oriental in 1969. President Corazon Aquino appointed him as the officer-in-charge of the governor's office (governor ad interim) in Negros Oriental in 1987. He also served as the representative of the Third District of Negros Oriental in Congress from 1998 to 2007.

=== Legislation ===
Teves helped in the passage of the following Republic Acts: 8800, 8980, 9295 and 9361.

== Death ==
Herminio Teves died at the age of 99 on May 15, 2019. He was survived by his eight children: Margarito, Pamela, Virginia (de Laurel), Arnolfo Sr., Herminio Jr., José Roel, Lucía Janice (de Gastón), and María Lorna (de Knoblauch).
