= Hermenegildo Villanueva =

Filipino politician (1876-1941)

The Honourable Hermenegildo Villanueva y Teves
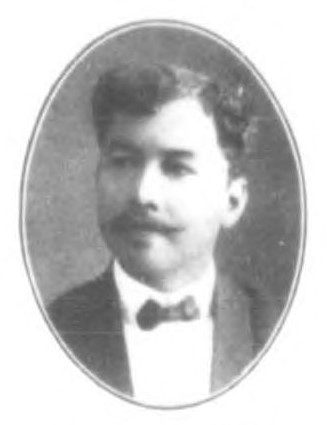
- Villanueva as member of the Philippine Assembly, c. 1912

Secretary of Labor
- Acting
- In office December 1938 – April 1939
- President: Manuel Quezon
- Preceded by: Jose Avelino
- Succeeded by: Sotero Baluyut

2nd Governor of Negros Oriental
- In office 1931–1935
- Preceded by: José Benito Atilano Joaquín Villegas y Teves
- Succeeded by: Julian Manuel Teves y Lajato
- In office 1907–1909
- Preceded by: Demetrio Larena
- Succeeded by: Juan Montenegro y Trasmonte

Senator of the Philippines from the 8th Senatorial District
- In office 1919 – 1931; Served with: Espiridion Guanco (1919–1925); Mariano Yulo (1925–1929); Francisco Zulueta (1929–1931)
- Preceded by: Manuel Lopez
- Succeeded by: Gil Montilla

Member of the Philippine Assembly from Negros Oriental's 1st District
- In office 1909–1916
- Preceded by: Leopoldo Rovira
- Succeeded by: Restituto Villegas

Personal details
- Born: September 25, 1876 Bais, Negros Oriental, Captaincy General of the Philippines
- Died: December 17, 1941 (aged 65) Manila Bay
- Party: Nacionalista Party
- Other political affiliations: Progresista
- Spouse: Asuncion de la Peña Larena

Hermenegildo Villanueva y Teves (September 25, 1876 – December 17, 1941), fondly called Bindoy, was a Filipino politician. He served as Secretary of Labor for Manuel L. Quezon from December 1938 until his resignation in April 1939.

== Personal life ==
Villanueva was born on the 25th of September, 1876 in Bais, Negros Oriental, one of the 11 children of Hermenegildo Villanueva y Regis (originally from Parián, Cebu) and Anselma Teves y Pinili of Dumaguete. He was privately tutored for primary education and finished secondary and tertiary education in Cebu. Upon finishing his studies, the Spanish–American War erupted and he became one of the leaders in the Negros Revolution.

He was married to Asunción de la Peña Larena, daughter of Don Demetrio Larena and Maria Luisa de la Peña of Zamboanguita. They had only one son, Jesus Pablo Hermenegildo, and he had five children with Nemecia Diputado.

As a sugar planter and progressive agriculturist, he was a long-time member of the board of directors of Central Azucarera de Bais y Tanjay founded by Tabacalera. He was also instrumental in the creation of the Sugar Central Board, forerunner of the present Sugar Regulatory Administration.

== Political career ==
After the Spanish–American War, he was appointed as justice of the peace in Bais. In 1902, he became municipal vice-president (vice mayor) and subsequently elected as municipal president (mayor) in 1903. He was reelected for another term in 1905.

In 1907, he succeeded Demetrio Larena as governor of Negros Oriental. In 1909, while serving an unexpired term as governor, he ran for a seat in the Philippine Assembly and won. He represented the first district of Negros Oriental for two consecutive terms from 1909 to 1912 and from 1912 to 1916.

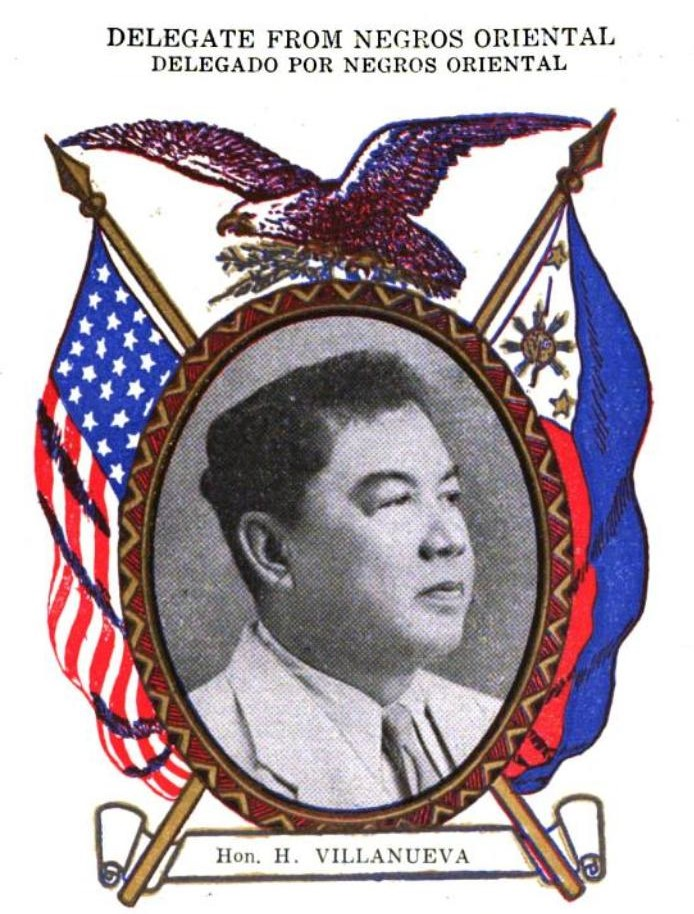
Photograph published by Benipayo Press, c. 1935

Villanueva then served as senator from the eighth senatorial district for two terms from 1919 to 1925 and from 1925 to 1931. Afterwards, he returned as governor of Negros Oriental for another two terms from 1931 to 1934 and from 1934 to 1937. During his incumbency as governor, he was elected as delegate to the 1934 Constitutional Convention that drafted the 1935 Philippine Constitution and was chairman of the Committees on National Defense, Special Provinces, and Sponsorship.

Prior to his appointment to the Quezon cabinet, he was appointed Chairman of the Board on Pension for Veterans in 1938.

== Death and legacy ==
Villanueva was aboard SS Corregidor when it sank in the early hours of December 17, 1941 upon striking a mine off Manila Bay. His newly married son, Jesus Pablo Hermenegildo Larena Villanueva, also perished as a result of the tragedy, whose bride of six months, American mestiza Estela Strong Estrada, who was 3 months pregnant with their son, Jaime Jesus Estrada Villanueva, survived the unfortunate incident.

In 1949, as decreed by President Elpidio Quirino, the barrio of Payabon was separated from the town of Manjuyod, Negros Oriental and created as the town of Bindoy, named after Villanueva.
