= Guillermo Villanueva =

Filipino politician

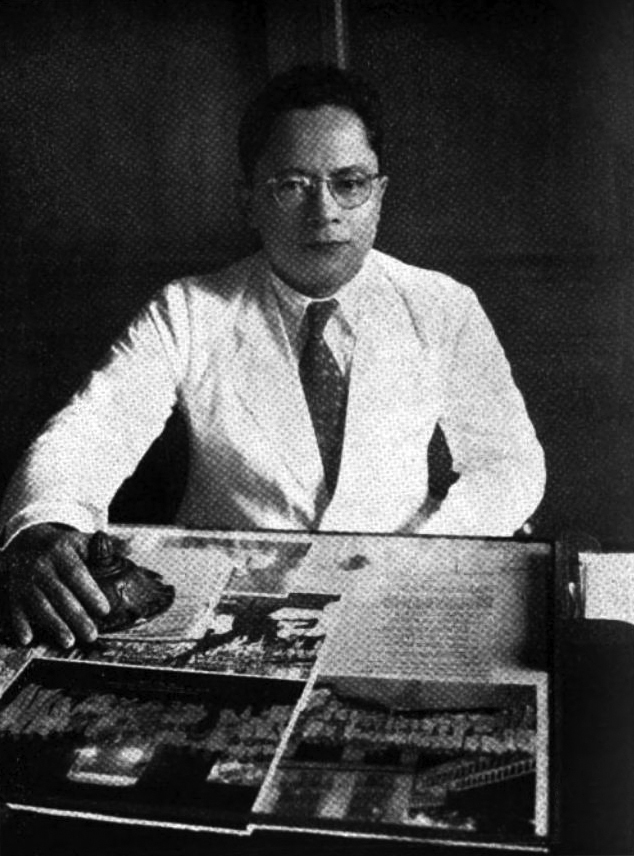
- Photograph from The Commercial & Industrial Manual of the Philippines, 1941

Governor of Negros Oriental
- In office 1941–1945
- Vice Governor: Alberto Furbeyre
- Preceded by: Julián Teves

Member of the National Assembly (Second Philippine Republic) from Negros Oriental
- Ex officio
- In office October 17, 1943 – February 2, 1944 Serving with Julián Teves

Member of the House of Representatives from Negros Oriental's 1st district Member of the National Assembly (1935-1941)
- In office June 6, 1922 – December 30, 1941
- Preceded by: Restituto Villegas
- Succeeded by: District abolished (Title next held by Julián Teves)

Personal details
- Born: Guillermo Zosimo Villanueva y Teves; April 4, 1891 Bais, Negros Oriental, Captaincy General of the Philippines
- Died: September 18, 1945 (aged 54) Zamboanguita, Negros Oriental, Philippine Commonwealth
- Party: KALIBAPI (1942–1945); Nacionalista (1922–1942)
- Spouse: Lourdes Atherton
- Occupation: Politician

Guillermo "Memong" Zosimo Villanueva y Teves (April 4, 1891 – September 18, 1945) was a Filipino politician who served as Governor of Negros Oriental during the Japanese occupation of the Philippines.

== Biography ==
=== Education ===
Villanueva earned a Bachelor of Arts degree from Silliman Institute in 1912, and a Bachelor of Laws degree from Michigan University in 1918.

=== Political career ===
After completing his education in the United States, Villanueva returned to the Philippines in 1919 and was appointed counselor of Bais in 1920.

In 1922, he was elected to Congress as representative from Negros Oriental's 1st congressional district. He was re-elected to the same office in 1925, 1928, and 1931.

He was elected Governor of Negros Oriental in the 1941 Philippine general election.

=== Death ===
Villanueva was killed on September 18, 1945 by retreating Japanese forces in Zamboanguita. There was no conclusive evidence to point out the reasons the Japanese forces killed him, and his remains were never recovered. His death came shortly before the main body of Japanese forces surrendered on September 22, 1945.
