= Lorenzo Teves =

Filipino politician (1918–1996)

The Honorable Lorenzo Teves
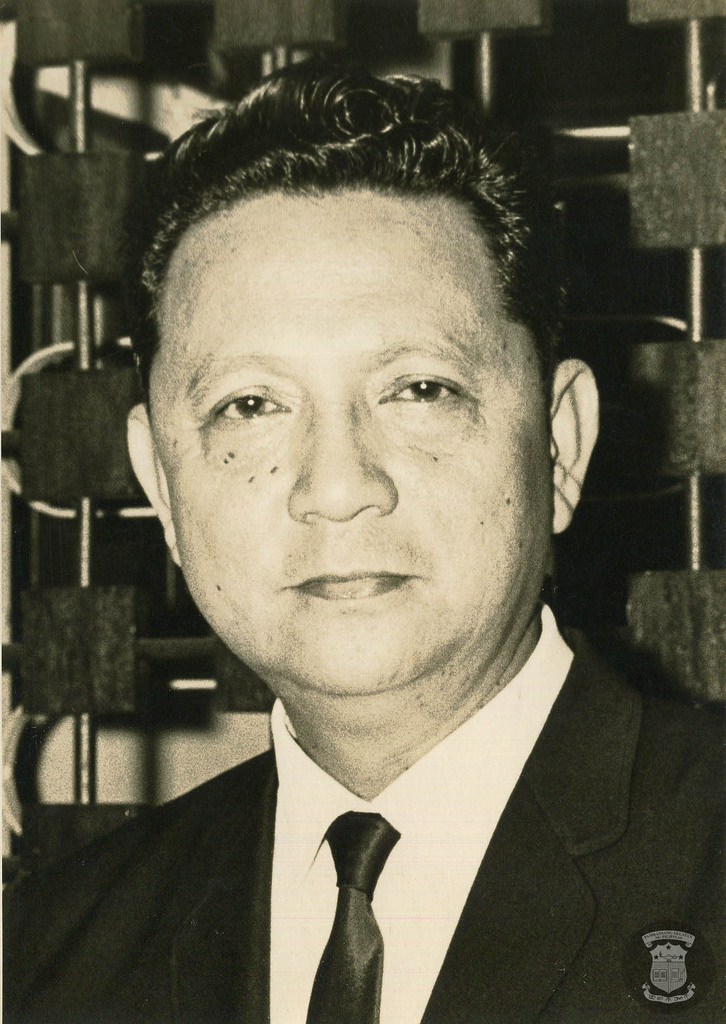

10th Governor of Negros Oriental
- In office 1978–1986
- Appointed by: Ferdinand Marcos
- Vice Governor: Emilio Macias II (1980–1985)
- Preceded by: William Villegas
- Succeeded by: Herminio Teves (officer in charge)

Senator of the Philippines
- In office December 30, 1967 – September 23, 1972

Member of the House of Representatives from Negros Oriental's 1st district
- In office December 30, 1953 – December 30, 1967
- Preceded by: Pedro Bandoquillo
- Succeeded by: Vacant; Post later held by Herminio Teves
- In office May 25, 1946 – December 30, 1949
- Preceded by: Julian Teves
- Succeeded by: Pedro Bandoquillo

Personal details
- Born: April 29, 1918 Valencia, Philippine Islands
- Died: October 17, 1996 (aged 78) Dumaguete
- Party: Nacionalista
- Spouse: Eva Jalandoni
- Relations: Herminio Teves (brother); Boboy Garrovillo (nephew); Margarito “Gary” Teves (nephew); Pryde Henry Teves (grandnephew); Arnie Teves (grandnephew)
- Children: 8 to Jalandoni and 3 in his second marriage
- Education: Silliman University (LL.B)
- Occupation: Politician

Lorenzo Guivelondo Teves (Valencia, Negros Oriental, April 29, 1918 – Dumaguete, October 17, 1996) was a Philippine politician who served in various positions in the Philippine Government.

== Early years ==
Teves hailed from the Province of Negros Oriental, where he took his college and law degrees from Silliman University.

== Political career ==
He was later on elected as representative of the 1st District of the province and served in that capacity from 1954 to 1965 in the 3rd, 4th and 5th Congresses of the Philippines. In 1967 he was elected as a senator for the 6th Congress and 7th Congress. However, his term was cut short when President Ferdinand Marcos declared Martial Law in 1972. In 1978, he was appointed by President Marcos as governor of Negros Oriental, and in 1979, was elected for that same position. He continued to hold the office until 1987.

== Honors ==
Teves was the area commander for Visayas of the Knights of Rizal from 1981 to 1985. He was also awarded the Hall of Fame of Boy Scouts of the Philippines Negros Oriental-Siquijor Council.

== Legacy ==
A sports complex and a street in his hometown of Dumaguete was later named after Lorenzo Teves after his death. He is succeeded by eight children from his first marriage and three children from his second marriage.
