= Emilio Macias =

Filipino politician (1933–2010)

Emilio Macias II M.D.
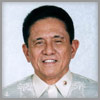
- Official portrait, 2004

17th Governor of Negros Oriental
- In office June 30, 2007 – June 13, 2010
- Vice Governor: Jose Baldado
- Preceded by: George Arnaiz
- Succeeded by: Jose Baldado
- In office February 2, 1988 – June 30, 1998
- Preceded by: Herminio G. Teves
- Succeeded by: George Arnaiz

Member of the House of Representatives from Negros Oriental's 2nd district
- In office June 30, 1998 – June 30, 2007
- Preceded by: Miguel Romero
- Succeeded by: George Arnaiz

Member of the Regular Batasang Pambansa from Negros Oriental
- In office July 23, 1984 – March 25, 1986 Serving with Ricardo Abiera and Andres Bustamante

Vice Governor of Negros Oriental
- In office 1980–1985
- Governor: Lorenzo Teves

Personal details
- Born: October 8, 1933 Dumaguete, Negros Oriental, Philippine Islands
- Died: June 13, 2010 (aged 76) Quezon City, Philippines
- Party: Nationalist People's Coalition
- Other political affiliations: Kilusang Bagong Lipunan (c. 1985)
- Education: Silliman University; University of the Philippines (M.D)
- Occupation: Politician
- Profession: Physician

Emilio "Dodo" Macias II (October 8, 1933 – June 13, 2010) was a Filipino politician and doctor who held various positions in the Philippine Government, particularly in the Province of Negros Oriental.

== Early life and education ==
Macias was born on October 8, 1933, to former Congressman Lamberto Macías y Lajato and Estrella Cabrera y Arbás.

He started his education at the West City Elementary School in Dumaguete, and then proceeded to Silliman University for his high school and college degrees.

After graduating from Silliman, he went to the University of the Philippines where he obtained his Doctor in Medicine degree.

He later on married, Dr. Melba Pandy López, a classmate of his, and together practiced medicine at their family-owned hospital in Dumaguete until 1984.

== Private and public career ==
=== Private sector ===
In addition to his medical practice, Macias served as president and chairman of the Rural Bank of Siaton from 1974 to 1975 and from 1978 to 1980. He also founded the Manuel L. Teves Memorial Hospital School of Midwifery, where he sat as a director until 1996.

=== Entry into politics ===
Macias’ entry into politics started when he was elected as one of the delegates to the 1971 Constitutional Convention, the body that drafted the 1973 Constitution of the Philippines. In 1975, he acquired a post in the Provincial Council in the Province of Negros Oriental, and was subsequently elected as Vice-Governor in 1980. From 1984 to 1986, he was one of the delegates representing Negros Oriental to the Regular Batasang Pambansa as a member of Kilusang Bagong Lipunan, then the ruling party during the administration of President Ferdinand Marcos. From 1985 to 1986, he served as Deputy Health Minister of the then Ministry of Health.

Macias was elected Governor in 1988 and continued to hold on to the post for three consecutive terms until 1998. After the expiration of his term, he ran for Congress and was elected as a Representative of the 2nd District of the Province. He served for three consecutive terms until 2007 when in the same year he was again elected as Governor of the Province. In the 2010 May elections, Macias won a second term but died of liver cancer before taking his oath of office. His body was cremated and the ashes flown to Dumaguete where a three-day wake was held in the Provincial Capitol. His ashes were subsequently brought to the Municipality of Siaton, Macias' hometown.

Macias was succeeded in office by outgoing vice governor Jose Baldado in an interim capacity for the remainder of his term until then vice governor-elect Agustin Perdices took office.
