= Pryde Henry Teves =

Filipino politician

The Honorable Pryde Henry Teves
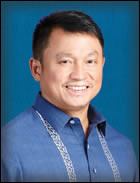
- Official portrait, 2013

21st Governor of Negros Oriental
- In office June 30, 2022 – October 11, 2022
- Vice Governor: Carlo Jorge Joan Reyes
- Preceded by: Roel Degamo
- Succeeded by: Roel Degamo

Mayor of Bayawan
- In office June 30, 2016 – June 30, 2022
- Preceded by: Ismael Martínez
- Succeeded by: John T. Raymond Jr.

Member of the Philippine House of Representatives from Negros Oriental's 3rd district
- In office June 30, 2007 – June 30, 2016
- Preceded by: Herminio Teves
- Succeeded by: Arnolfo Teves Jr.

Personal details
- Born: Pryde Henry Alipit Teves; December 18, 1972 (age 53) Dumaguete, Negros Oriental, Philippines
- Party: Liberal (2024–present)
- Other political affiliations: NPC (2010–2024); Lakas–CMD (2007–2010)
- Spouse: Zonna Lee Diago de Teves
- Relations: Arnolfo Teves Jr. (brother); Herminio Teves (grandfather); Margarito Teves (uncle); Lorenzo Teves (granduncle)
- Education: De La Salle University
- Occupation: Businessman

Pryde Henry Alipit Teves (born December 18, 1972) is a Filipino politician who served as governor of Negros Oriental from June to October 2022, when the Commission on Elections (COMELEC) annulled his proclamation due to a recount of the May 2022 election. He was the mayor of Bayawan, Negros Oriental from 2016 to 2022, and was the Representative of Negros Oriental's 3rd district from 2007 to 2016. He is a survivor of the 2007 Batasang Pambansa bombing, although both of his eardrums and legs were severely injured.

== Political career ==
=== Philippine Congress bombing ===
Congressman Teves was one of the three Philippine representatives, others were Luzviminda Ilagan of GABRIELA partylist and Wahab Akbar of the lone district of Basilan, that were victimized by the explosion. Representative Akbar was killed in the incident while both Teves and Congresswoman Luzviminda Ilagan suffered severe injuries.

About 62% of his body sustained second and third degree burns, and his left foot was badly fractured. In earlier reports, doctors announced that Teves' legs would be amputated, but later decided this would not be necessary. Vercita Garcia, staff member of Rep. Pryde Henry Teves, died at 6:30 p.m. due to cardiac arrest at St. Luke's Medical Center in Quezon City, on December 17, 2007.

On December 18, 2007, after 35 days, Teves was moved out of the intensive care unit of St. Luke's Medical Center to a private room, and recuperated from destroyed eardrum, fractured leg and sustained deep burns in his arms from the Batasang Pambansa bombing.

On January 31, 2008, Teves, 35, reported for work at the House of Representatives, against doctors' advice. Teves, still in a wheelchair, wore black cotton gloves to protect his burned hands, and he could not shake hands or use his cellular phone. He stated:

I feel all the senses in my body that I don't want to feel, all the unwanted pain. I really got depressed. And my (burned) skin (including face) is extra sensitive. When it's hot I feel the heat and when it's cold I also feel very cold. My left foot was shattered in 10 places. It's all held together by screws. Hopefully, after 20 weeks (since Nov. 13) the bones will heal; I’m still under heavy medication. And I still take pain relievers. The pain is terrible. Three days ago (Jan. 26), I had two shrapnels removed from my body. They were all concrete nails.

=== As provincial governor ===
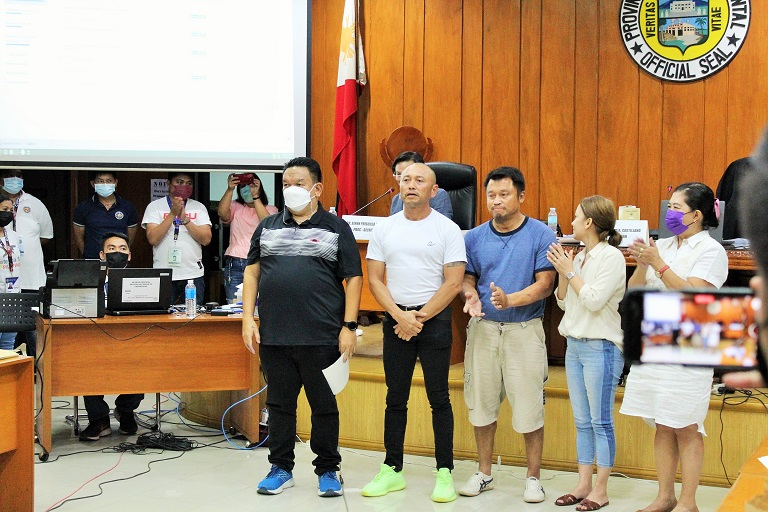
Pryde Henry Teves (center) during the proclamation of the winner for the 2022 gubernatorial race in Negros Oriental

In 2022, Teves, ran under Nationalist People's Coalition, defeated incumbent Negros Oriental Governor Roel Degamo with a winning margin of almost twenty thousand votes.

On June 30, 2022, Teves took his oath of office replacing Degamo who had stepped down following a brief standoff as the latter refused to vacate the office.

==== Invalidation of election ====
Negros Oriental gubernatorial election, 2022
Candidates	Party	Votes	
Candidates	Party	Final and official result (Note: Representing 100% Certificates of Canvass received from Boards of Canvassers, as per COMELEC.)	Updated canvass, Oct. 2022 (Note: As per COMELEC special provincial board of canvassers, applying the commission's en banc resolution, Sept. 2022.)
Pryde Henry Teves	NPC	301,319	301,319
Roel Degamo (Incumbent)	Nacionalista	281,773	331,726 (Note: Ruel Degamo, Grego Gaudia in real life, was declared nuisance candidate; votes obtained by him were later credited to Roel Degamo.)
Ruel Degamo	Independent	49,953	0
Edward Mark Macias	Liberal	45,454	N/A
Notes:

Roel Degamo, who ran for his fourth yet final term after a controversial Commission on Elections (COMELEC) ruling (Degamo had completed three consecutive terms already), had filed a petition before the COMELEC to declare another gubernatorial candidate, a certain Ruel Degamo, whose real name is Grego Gaudia, a nuisance and to cancel the latter's candidacy, which had later decided. He appealed that the votes for Gaudia should be credited to him.

Gaudia filed a motion for reconsideration to contest the ruling of the COMELEC. Pending the commission's ruling by the day of election, his name (Ruel Degamo) remained on the official ballot. On September 1, 2022, his appeal was denied.

The COMELEC en banc, in its ruling with finality dated September 27, credited Gaudia's almost fifty thousand obtained votes to Degamo, thus surpassing that of Teves by almost thirty thousand, which also made the proclamation of Teves to be nullified. Prior to the proclamation of Degamo on October 3, Teves said in his weekend radio program that while respecting whatever decision by either the COMELEC, Supreme Court (SC), or the Department of the Interior and Local Government (DILG) on his election victory, he would not stay further if the ruling in favor of Degamo is enforced.

However, Teves had been refusing to step down despite Degamo's inauguration on October 5 and a DILG order on the same day asking him to vacate the office, saying that the COMELEC decision is final and executory. Teves had filed a quo warranto petition before the SC contesting the said COMELEC ruling, which was expected to be decided by October 11.

Later, on that day, Teves voluntarily relinquished the governorship as the SC, in a media statement, said that they had not act yet on the appeal.

On February 14, 2023, the SC en banc dismissed Teves' petition, thus, affirming the COMELEC's declaration of Degamo's victory.

==== Aftermath ====
Teves ran again in the 2025 Philippine general election as governor of Negros Oriental, but lost to incumbent Chaco Sagarbarria.

== Accusations of terrorism ==
On July 26, 2023, the Anti-Terrorism Council designated Teves, his brother, suspended Congressman for the 3rd district of Negros Occidental Arnolfo Teves Jr. and eleven other associates as terrorists acting under what it called the "Teves Terrorist Group", in connection with the assassination of Governor Degamo on March 4.

Following his brother's expulsion from Congress for his continued absence, Pryde Henry filed a certificate of candidacy to replace him in special elections for the 3rd district scheduled on December 9, 2023. However, his candidacy was invalidated hours after filing it on November 8 after COMELEC cancelled the elections following a resolution from the House of Representatives.

On June 20, 2024, Dumaguete Regional Trial Court, Judge Gerardo Paguia Jr. ordered the release of Henry Teves after the latter posted bail for terrorism charges. Earlier he surrendered to police based on a warrant by Cebu City Regional Trial Court Branch 74 Judge Marlon Jay Moneva.

Political offices
Preceded by Roel Degamo	Governor of Negros Oriental; 2022	Succeeded by Roel Degamo
Preceded by Ismael Martinez	Mayor of Bayawan; 2016–2022	Succeeded by John T. Raymond Jr.
House of Representatives of the Philippines
Preceded by Herminio Teves	Member of the House of Representatives from Negros Oriental's 3rd district 2007–2016	Succeeded by Arnolfo Teves Jr.
