= Santa Catalina, Negros Oriental =

Municipality in Negros Oriental, Philippines

Santa Catalina
- Municipality
- Municipality of Santa Catalina
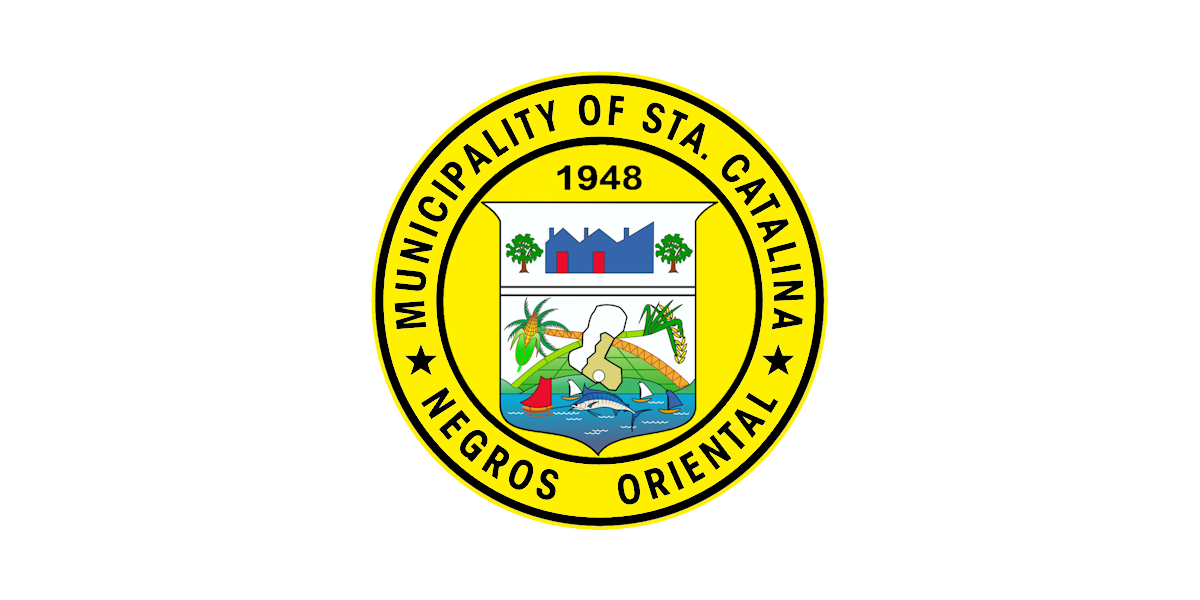
- Flag Seal
- Nicknames: Santa, Sta.Cata, Tolong
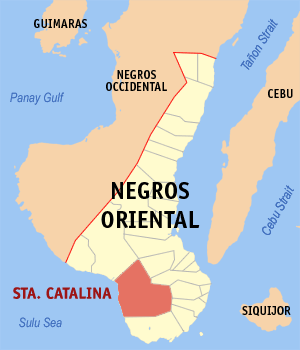
- Map of Negros Oriental with Santa Catalina highlighted
- Interactive map of Santa Catalina
- Location within the Philippines
- Coordinates: 9°19′59″N 122°51′57″E
- Country: Philippines
- Region: Negros Island Region
- Province: Negros Oriental
- District: 3rd district
- Founded: December 17, 1947
- Named for: St. Catherine of Alexandria
- Barangays: 22 (see Barangays)

Government
  - Type: Sangguniang Bayan
  - Mayor: Peve O. Ligan (NPC)
  - Vice Mayor: Jonny C. Abrasaldo (Ind)
  - Representative: Janice Degamo (Lakas)
  - Municipal Council: Members: Joey Chris H. Nuico; Edmar M. Bigay; Nelson C. Lopez; Elpidio R. Electona, Jr.; Herman Januar B. Carballo; Arnolfo O. Muyco; Gerard F. Napigkit; Danilo P. Nalam; Christopher Jake Llanto ^{◌}; ◌ ex officio SK chairman
  - Electorate: 49,144 voters (2025)

Area
  - Total: 523.10 km^{2} (201.97 sq mi)
- Elevation: 164 m (538 ft)
- Highest elevation: 1,841 m (6,040 ft)
- Lowest elevation: 0 m (0 ft)

Population (2024 census)
  - Total: 80,382
  - Density: 153.66/km^{2} (397.99/sq mi)
  - Households: 18,356

Economy
  - Income class: 1st municipal income class
  - Poverty incidence: 35.64% (2023)
  - Revenue: ₱ 384.6 million (2024)
  - Assets: ₱ 1,812 million (2024)
  - Expenditure: ₱ 168.3 million (2024)
  - Liabilities: ₱ 283.4 million (2024)

Service provider
  - Electricity: Negros Oriental 2 Electric Cooperative (NORECO 2)
- Time zone: UTC+8 (PST)
- ZIP code: 6220
- PSGC: 1804618000
- IDD : area code: +63 (0)35
- Native languages: Cebuano; Magahat; Tagalog

Santa Catalina, officially the Municipality of Santa Catalina (Cebuano: Lungsod sa Santa Catalina; Tagalog: Bayan ng Santa Catalina), is a municipality in the province of Negros Oriental, Philippines. According to the 2024 census, it has a population of 80,382 people.

The town is home to the Minagahat language, the indigenous language of Southern Negros as listed by the Komisyon sa Wikang Filipino. The language is vital to the culture and arts of the people. The town is also known for its boat-building tradition which originated from the pre-colonial era. Its boat-building tradition has been granted funding by UNESCO in 2015 for proper documentation and future inscription in the UNESCO Lists of Intangible Cultural Heritage elements. However, no public information about the outcome of the funding has been made.

== Etymology ==
The town of Santa Catalina got its name after the supposedly miraculous image of the patron saint, Santa Catalina de Alejandria, installed in the community chapel.

== History ==
Spanish Regime

The town of Santa Catalina was formerly named Tolong. In about 1572, Captain Miguel de Laorca, a member of Legaspi's expedition, sent the first Spanish mission led by Adrien Lajot, a Belgian mercenary (from Provence Liège) in order to take possession of Negros Island. During that period, there existed settlements at Lunsod (now Daan Lunsod), Secopan (now Secopong), and Cawitan ruled by three chieftains. It was said that these warring chieftains were settled and amicably fused by the Spaniards as a single settlement at Daan Lunsod. In the process of settling, the Spaniards referred to the chieftains as “Kamo Tolon”, (a mispronounced phrase for “Kamo Tolo” which means “The Three of You”). Hence, the name TOLON, and then eventually TOLONG.

Santa Catalina Parish Church

According to the Definatorio of June 11, 1580, the beginning of the Christian Organization of Negros Island was due to the Augustinian Friars. Because of the lack of priests, the secular priest of the Diocese of Cebu undertook the spiritual administration of Negros Island. He placed Dumaguete, Siaton, Marabao (now Bacong), and Manalongon (the name of the river) under the Ministry of Tanjay. In 1751, Tolong and the settlements further down south were taken over by the Recollect Friars because of the distance and difficulty of transportation.

Before 1855, the Recollect Friars who took over the mission of Tolong constructed a convent, a church, a cemetery, and a Tribunal House. The church was built of light materials but the convent and the Tribunal House were made of lime and limestone. In that same period, the poblacion of Tolong was moved and resettled from the old site, Daan Lunsod, to a site further down the coast where the church was built, the present location of Santa Catalina. Even today, a famous landmark can be seen in the form of a balete tree growing on what was left of a portion of a wall of the old Tribunal House, right in the heart of Santa Catalina, which has become a symbol of the town.

An adjacent town, Bayawan, became formally organized in the year 1872.

The occupation of Negros Island increased rapidly, and agriculture progressed in an inconceivable manner. The Spanish government, in order to attain better administration, formed and organized the province of Negros Oriental in the year 1890, completely independent from the Occidental, Dumaguete was made capital of Negros Oriental and Tolong was next to the last town in the south to be within the province of Negros Oriental.

American Regime

In the new regime of the American occupation, sometime in the year 1903, the Poblacion of Tolong and Bayawan could not meet the minimum requirement to qualify for a municipality. So the two poblacions were fused together making Bayawan as the main Municipality, calling it Tolong Nuevo, and Tolong was reduced to be a mere Barrio called Tolong Viejo.

Japanese Regime

When World War II broke out, the Japanese occupied Dumaguete on May 26, 1942. Since Tolong was the headquarters of the Guerrilla Movement under the leadership of Col. Abside with Lt. Gonzalo Melodia and some of his Tolong Viejo defenders, the Japanese visited the place with caution, landing only at dawn and back to Dumaguete in the afternoon. The recognized guerrilla unit was aided by local soldiers of the Philippine Commonwealth Army military units engage to encounter by attacking Japanese troops at Santa Catalina from 1942 to 1945 until retreating of all guerrilla fighters from the enemy hands. The province was liberated on April 26, 1945, by the combined forces of the United States Army, Philippine Commonwealth Army, Philippine Constabulary and the Recognized Guerrillas.

Post World War II

After the war, in 1945, Congressman Enrique Medina, who considered himself as a son of Tolong Viejo, sponsored a move to separate Tolong Viejo from Tolong Nuevo.

On December 17, 1947, President Manuel Roxas issued executive order No. 111, making Santa Catalina (previously Tolong Nuevo) the 26th municipality of Negros Oriental. After which, Tolong Nuevo immediately passed a resolution to rename their municipality Bayawan reviving the former name. Hence, the name TOLONG immediately disappeared.

== Geography ==
The topography of Santa Catalina is predominantly slightly rolling hills (70% of its area), 25% is flat, and the remainder is steep terrain. There are 8 rivers and 27 springs. Santa Catalina is 94 kilometres (58 mi) from Dumaguete.

=== Barangays ===
Political map of Santa Catalina

Santa Catalina is politically subdivided into 22 barangays. Each barangay consists of puroks and some have sitios.

PSGC	Barangay	Population			±% p.a.	
		2024		2010		
074618001	Alangilan	5.2%	4,197	4,361	▾	−0.27%
074618002	Amio	2.2%	1,787	2,118	▾	−1.17%
074618003	Buenavista	1.5%	1,182	990	▴	1.24%
074618006	Caigangan	2.1%	1,662	1,386	▴	1.27%
074618008	Caranoche	5.4%	4,319	3,913	▴	0.69%
074618009	Cawitan	7.4%	5,953	5,809	▴	0.17%
074618010	Fatima	2.0%	1,577	1,317	▴	1.26%
074618004	Kabulakan	3.6%	2,872	2,480	▴	1.02%
074618011	Mabuhay	2.2%	1,770	1,847	▾	−0.29%
074618012	Manalongon	6.2%	4,999	4,842	▴	0.22%
074618013	Mansagomayon	1.4%	1,123	1,011	▴	0.73%
074618014	Milagrosa	4.5%	3,599	3,385	▴	0.43%
074618015	Nagbinlod	3.8%	3,029	3,012	▴	0.04%
074618016	Nagbalaye	7.3%	5,829	4,957	▴	1.13%
074618017	Obat	2.8%	2,287	2,599	▾	−0.88%
074618019	Poblacion	17.5%	14,034	12,515	▴	0.80%
074618020	San Francisco	5.7%	4,545	4,052	▴	0.80%
074618021	San Jose	3.1%	2,492	2,539	▾	−0.13%
074618022	San Miguel	1.8%	1,433	1,282	▴	0.77%
074618023	San Pedro	3.7%	2,984	3,319	▾	−0.73%
074618024	Santo Rosario	1.3%	1,063	1,315	▾	−1.46%
074618025	Talalak	5.9%	4,765	4,257	▴	0.78%
	Total		80,382	73,306	▴	0.64%

=== Climate ===
Climate data for Santa Catalina, Negros Oriental
Month	Jan	Feb	Mar	Apr	May	Jun	Jul	Aug	Sep	Oct	Nov	Dec	Year
Mean daily maximum °C (°F)	31 (88)	31 (88)	32 (90)	33 (91)	31 (88)	30 (86)	29 (84)	29 (84)	29 (84)	29 (84)	30 (86)	30 (86)	30 (87)
Mean daily minimum °C (°F)	22 (72)	22 (72)	22 (72)	24 (75)	25 (77)	25 (77)	25 (77)	25 (77)	25 (77)	25 (77)	24 (75)	23 (73)	24 (75)
Average precipitation mm (inches)	46 (1.8)	45 (1.8)	56 (2.2)	83 (3.3)	163 (6.4)	203 (8.0)	236 (9.3)	204 (8.0)	210 (8.3)	211 (8.3)	143 (5.6)	77 (3.0)	1,677 (66)
Average rainy days	12.1	9.8	14.3	17.5	26.0	27.8	28.4	26.9	26.7	27.9	23.3	17.2	257.9
Source: Meteoblue

Dry season: November to April
Wet season: May to September
Average temperature: 36 °C (97 °F)

== Demographics ==
Population census of Santa Catalina
Year	Pop.	±% p.a.
1948	8,819	—
1960	15,743	+4.95%
1970	39,601	+9.65%
1975	51,949	+5.59%
1980	56,751	+1.78%
1990	53,560	−0.58%
1995	62,526	+2.94%
2000	67,197	+1.56%
2007	72,629	+1.08%
2010	73,306	+0.34%
2015	75,756	+0.63%
2020	77,501	+0.48%
2024	80,382	+0.88%
Source: Philippine Statistics Authority

== Economy ==
Poverty incidence of Santa Catalina (%)

Source: Philippine Statistics Authority

== Education ==
The public schools in the town of Santa Catalina are administered by four school districts under the Schools Division of Negros Oriental.

=== Elementary schools ===
- Ambrosio M. Ramirez Elementary School — Alangilan
- Amio Elementary School — Amio
- Avocado Elementary School — Sitio Avocado, Talalak
- Aw-a Elementary School — Sitio Aw-a, Poblacion
- Bago-Bago Elementary School — Sitio Bago-Bago, Nagbalaye
- Baknit Elementary School — Sitio Baknit, San Francisco
- Buenavista Elementary School — Buenavista
- Caigangan Elementary School — Caigangan
- Caniogan Valley Elementary School — Sitio Matanog, Alangilan
- Caranoche Elementary School — Caranoche
- Carmen Teves Tia Memorial Elementary School — Sitio Sto. Niño, San Pedro
- Cawitan Elementary School — Cawitan
- Danao Elementary School — Sitio Danao, Nagbinlod
- Elias R. Macias Memorial Elementary School — San Pedro
- Fatima Elementary School — Fatima
- Hingles Elementary School — Sitio Hingles, San Francisco
- Jagna Elementary School — Sitio Jagna, Nagbalaye
- Jose Lalamonan Elementary School (formerly San Jose ES) — San Jose
- Kabulakan Elementary School — Kabulakan
- Kakha Elementary School — Sitio Kakha, Talalak
- Kanggabok Elementary School — Sitio Kanggabok, Nagbinlod
- Mabuhay Elementary School — Mabuhay
- Malatubahan Elementary School — Milagrosa
- Manalongon-Nicolas Nalam Lajot Central School — Manalongon
- Manggolod Elementary School — Sitio Manggolod, San Jose
- Mansagomayon Elementary School — Mansagomayon
- Marcelino E. Elligan-Banlas Elementary School — Sitio Nagub-an, Milagrosa
- Nagbalaye Elementary School — Nagbalaye
- Nagbinlod Elementary School — Nagbinlod
- Obat Elementary School — Obat
- Omol Elementary School — Sitio Omol, Talalak
- Omoso Elementary School — Sitio Nahulan, Mansagomayon
- San Francisco Elementary School — San Francisco
- San Isidro Elementary School — Sitio Cantiban, San Pedro
- San Miguel Elementary School — San Miguel
- San Vicente Elementary School — Sitio San Vicente, San Miguel
- Sta. Catalina Central Elementary School — Nat'l Highway, Poblacion
- Sta. Catalina Science Elementary School — Nat'l Highway, Poblacion
- Sto. Rosario Elementary School — Santo Rosario
- Sto. Tomas Elementary School — Sitio Pinangimnan, Obat
- Talalak Elementary School — Talalak
- Tamlang Elementary School — Sitio Tamlang, Talalak
- Tubod Elementary School — Sitio Tubod, Nagbinlod

=== High schools ===
- Amio Comprehensive High School — Amio
- Avocado Community High School — Sitio Avocado, Talalak
- Casiano Z. Napigkit National High School — Manalongon
- Cawitan High School — Cawitan
- Don Emilio Macias Memorial National High School — San Francisco
- Eligio T. Monte de Ramos High School (formerly Milagrosa HS) — Milagrosa
- Kakha High School — Sitio Kakha, Talalak
- Nagbalaye High School — Nagbalaye
- Nagbinlod High School — Nagbinlod
- Obat High School — Obat
- Pedro R. Abul Memorial High School — Sitio Cantiban, San Francisco
- San Miguel High School — San Miguel
- Sta. Catalina National High School — Nat'l Highway, Poblacion
- Sta. Catalina Science High School — Cawitan
- Tamlang High School — Sitio Tamlang, Talalak

=== Private schools ===
- Sta. Catalina Academy — Nat'l Highway, Poblacion
- Sta. Catalina de Alejandria Catholic School Inc. — Sta. Catalina Street, Poblacion
- UCCP Santa Catalina Learning Center Inc. — Juan Luna Street, Poblacion

== Government ==
=== List of former chief executives ===
The former mayors of Santa Catalina are:

- 1948–1951: Telesforo Belloso (First Appointed Mayor)
- 1951–1968: Herminio T. Electona (first elected Mayor)
- 1968–1971: Jose N. Napigkit
- 1971–1980: Herminio T. Electona
- 1980–1986: Jose N. Napigkit
- 1986–1987: Herminio T. Electona
- 1987–1998: Jose N. Napigkit(Appointed OIC Mayor)
- 1998–2007: Leon M. Lopez
- 2007–2010: Ruben O. Melodia
- 2010–2013: Leon M. Lopez
- 2013–2018: Nataniel Electona
- 2018–2019: Nelson C. Lopez
- 2019–Present: Peve O. Ligan
