= Margarito Teves =

Filipino politician (born 1943)

Margarito B. Teves
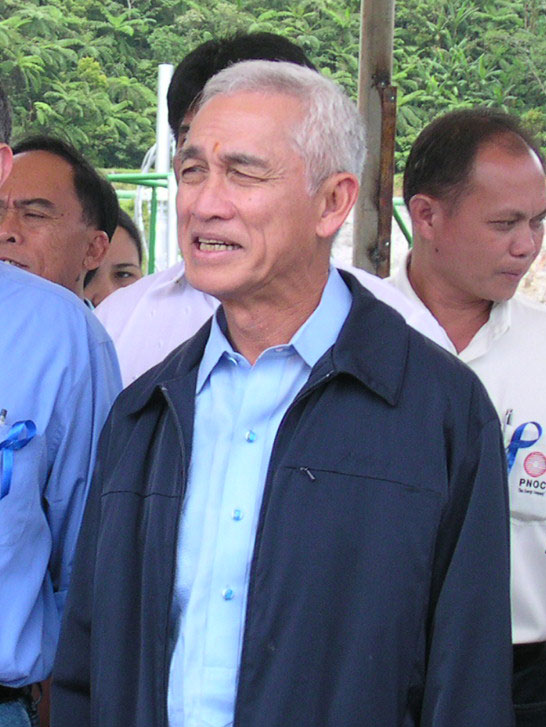
- Teves in 2006

38th Secretary of Finance
- In office July 22, 2005 – June 30, 2010
- President: Gloria Macapagal Arroyo
- Preceded by: Cesar Purisima
- Succeeded by: Cesar Purisima

Member of the House of Representatives from Negros Oriental's 3rd district
- In office June 30, 1987 – June 30, 1998
- Preceded by: District created
- Succeeded by: Herminio Teves

Personal details
- Born: Margarito Bustaliño Teves; August 1, 1943 (age 83) Dipolog, Zamboanga
- Party: Lakas (1995–present)
- Other political affiliations: UNIDO (1984–1987); Lakas ng Bansa (1987–1988); Laban ng Demokratikong Pilipino (1988–1995)
- Spouse: Loretto Santos
- Children: 3
- Education: Williams College (MA)

Margarito "Gary" Bustaliño Teves (born August 1, 1943) is a Filipino politician who served as Secretary of the Department of Finance of the Philippines. He was appointed to the position in July 2005 by President Gloria Macapagal Arroyo, following a mass resignation of her economic team. In January 2009 he was named "Best Finance Minister" in Asia, a title given by London-based international finance magazine, The Banker.

== Early life and education ==
Teves was born in Sangkol, Dipolog, Zamboanga, to Herminio Teves and Narcisa Bustaliño. Teves received his M.A. in Developmental Economics from Williams College in 1968.

== Career ==
=== Congressman ===
He was elected congressman representing the 3rd district of Negros Oriental from 1987 to 1998. Following his three terms in office—the maximum number allowed by the constitution—he was succeeded by his father, Herminio Teves.

=== Secretary of Finance ===
Teves was appointed Secretary of the Department of Finance in July 2005 by President Gloria Macapagal Arroyo, following a mass resignation of members of her economic team. As Finance Secretary, he oversaw the Arroyo administration's efforts to reduce the government's budget deficit.

== Personal life ==
He is married to Loretto "Nini" Santos, and had three children together.

Government offices
Preceded by Juanita Dy Amatong	Secretary of Finance; 2005–2010	Succeeded by Cesar Purisima
House of Representatives of the Philippines
New title	Member of the House of Representatives from Negros Oriental's 3rd district 1987–1998	Succeeded by Herminio Teves
