= 2025 Philippine House of Representatives elections in the Negros Island Region =

- May 12, 2025
- All 11 Negros Island Region seats in the House of Representatives
Party	Seats
Lakas	4
NPC	2
NUP	2
PFP	2
Independent	1
This lists parties that won seats. See the complete results below.

The 2025 Philippine House of Representatives elections in the Negros Island Region were held on May 12, 2025, as part of the 2025 Philippine general election.

== Summary ==
Congressional district	Incumbent	Incumbent's party	Winner	Winner's party	Winning margin
Bacolod	Greg Gasataya	NPC	Albee Benitez	Independent	15.51%
Negros Occidental–1st	Gerardo Valmayor Jr.	NPC	Jules Ledesma	NPC	90.54%
Negros Occidental–2nd	Alfredo Marañon III	NUP	Alfredo Marañon III	NUP	Unopposed
Negros Occidental–3rd	Vacant		Javi Benitez	PFP	84.06%
Negros Occidental–4th	Yoyette Ferrer	NUP	Jeffrey Ferrer	NUP	28.40%
Negros Occidental–5th	Dino Yulo	Lakas	Dino Yulo	Lakas	69.34%
Negros Occidental–6th	Mercedes Lansang	NPC	Mercedes Lansang	NPC	68.30%
Negros Oriental–1st	Jocelyn Limkaichong	NPC	Emmanuel Iway	PFP	25.08%
Negros Oriental–2nd	Chiquiting Sagarbarria	NPC	Maisa Sagarbarria	Lakas	20.06%
Negros Oriental–3rd	Vacant		Janice Degamo	Lakas	28.45%
Siquijor	Zaldy Villa	Lakas	Zaldy Villa	Lakas	14.32%

== Bacolod ==
Term-limited incumbent Greg Gasataya (Nationalist People's Coalition) ran for mayor of Bacolod.

Gasataya endorsed Bacolod mayor Albee Benitez (Independent), who won the election against former Bacolod mayor Evelio Leonardia (Nacionalista Party) and three other candidates.

Candidate	Party	Votes	%
Albee Benitez	Independent	164,145	56.96
Evelio Leonardia	Nacionalista Party	119,431	41.45
Ed Gulmatico	Independent	1,671	0.58
Roger Abanid	Independent	1,513	0.53
Romy Gustilo	Independent	1,394	0.48
Total		288,154	100.00
Valid votes		288,154	93.13
Invalid/blank votes		21,259	6.87
Total votes		309,413	100.00
Registered voters/turnout		355,880	86.94
Independent gain from NPC			
Source: Commission on Elections

== Negros Occidental ==
=== 1st district ===
Incumbent Gerardo Valmayor Jr. of the Nationalist People's Coalition (NPC) retired.

The NPC nominated former representative Jules Ledesma, who won the election against Erie Mahinay (Partido Lakas ng Masa).

Candidate	Party	Votes	%
Jules Ledesma	Nationalist People's Coalition	157,328	95.27
Erie Mahinay	Partido Lakas ng Masa	7,819	4.73
Total		165,147	100.00
Valid votes		165,147	77.39
Invalid/blank votes		48,250	22.61
Total votes		213,397	100.00
Registered voters/turnout		257,408	82.90
NPC hold			
Source: Commission on Elections

=== 2nd district ===
Incumbent Alfredo Marañon III of the National Unity Party won re-election for a second term unopposed.

Candidate	Party	Votes	%
Alfredo Marañon III (incumbent)	National Unity Party	121,482	100.00
Total		121,482	100.00
Valid votes		121,482	73.05
Invalid/blank votes		44,816	26.95
Total votes		166,298	100.00
Registered voters/turnout		212,207	78.37
NUP hold			
Source: Commission on Elections

=== 3rd district ===
The seat is vacant after Jose Francisco Benitez of the Partido Federal ng Pilipinas resigned on August 16, 2024, upon appointment as Director-General of the Technical Education and Skills Development Authority. He was previously affiliated with PDP–Laban.

The PFP nominated Benitez' nephew, Victorias mayor Javi Benitez, who won the election against Joel Bantigue (Partido Lakas ng Masa).

Candidate	Party	Votes	%
Javi Benitez	Partido Federal ng Pilipinas	200,044	92.03
Joel Bantigue	Partido Lakas ng Masa	17,336	7.97
Total		217,380	100.00
Valid votes		217,380	81.08
Invalid/blank votes		50,716	18.92
Total votes		268,096	100.00
Registered voters/turnout		317,481	84.44
PFP hold			
Source: Commission on Elections

=== 4th district ===
Incumbent Yoyette Ferrer of the National Unity Party was term-limited.

The NUP nominated Ferrer's husband, Negros Occidental vice governor Jeffrey Ferrer, who won the election against former Department of Human Settlements and Urban Development assistant secretary Lea Delfinado (Nationalist People's Coalition).

Candidate	Party	Votes	%
Jeffrey Ferrer	National Unity Party	130,023	64.20
Lea Delfinado	Nationalist People's Coalition	72,503	35.80
Total		202,526	100.00
Valid votes		202,526	94.68
Invalid/blank votes		11,375	5.32
Total votes		213,901	100.00
Registered voters/turnout		247,306	86.49
NUP hold			
Source: Commission on Elections

=== 5th district ===
Incumbent Dino Yulo of Lakas–CMD ran for a second term.

Yulo won re-election against provincial board member Anton Occeño (Partido Federal ng Pilipinas).

Candidate	Party	Votes	%
Dino Yulo (incumbent)	Lakas–CMD	201,003	84.67
Anton Occeño	Partido Federal ng Pilipinas	36,406	15.33
Total		237,409	100.00
Valid votes		237,409	92.96
Invalid/blank votes		17,991	7.04
Total votes		255,400	100.00
Registered voters/turnout		301,233	84.78
Lakas hold			
Source: Commission on Elections

=== 6th district ===
Incumbent Mercedes Lansang of the Nationalist People's Coalition ran for a second term.

Lansang won the election against Ernesto Estrao (PDP–Laban).

Candidate	Party	Votes	%
Mercedes Lansang (incumbent)	Nationalist People's Coalition	180,266	84.15
Ernesto Estrao	PDP–Laban	33,965	15.85
Total		214,231	100.00
Valid votes		214,231	84.83
Invalid/blank votes		38,309	15.17
Total votes		252,540	100.00
Registered voters/turnout		310,217	81.41
NUP hold			
Source: Commission on Elections

== Negros Oriental ==
=== 1st district ===
Term-limited incumbent Jocelyn Sy-Limkaichong of the Nationalist People's Coalition ran for mayor of Guihulngan.

Limkaichong endorsed her nephew, La Libertad mayor Emmanuel Iway (Partido Federal ng Pilipinas), who won the election against Kingking Mijares (Liberal Party).

Candidate	Party	Votes	%
Emmanuel Iway	Partido Federal ng Pilipinas	138,507	62.54
Kingking Mijares	Liberal Party	82,977	37.46
Total		221,484	100.00
Valid votes		221,484	87.48
Invalid/blank votes		31,687	12.52
Total votes		253,171	100.00
Registered voters/turnout		292,029	86.69
PFP gain from NPC			
Source: Commission on Elections

=== 2nd district ===
Term-limited incumbent Chiquiting Sagarbarria of the Nationalist People's Coalition) ran for mayor of Dumaguete.

Sagarbarria endorsed his wife, Dumaguete vice mayor Maisa Sagarbarria (Lakas–CMD), who won the election against Dumaguete mayor Ipe Remollo (Liberal Party) and two other candidates.

Candidate	Party	Votes	%
Maisa Sagarbarria	Lakas–CMD	159,412	58.87
Ipe Remollo	Liberal Party	105,111	38.81
Jimmy Merto	Independent	3,173	1.17
Ryan Ybañez	Independent	3,113	1.15
Total		270,809	100.00
Valid votes		270,809	84.00
Invalid/blank votes		51,594	16.00
Total votes		322,403	100.00
Registered voters/turnout		375,249	85.92
Lakas gain from NPC			
Source: Commission on Elections

=== 3rd district ===
The seat is vacant after Arnolfo Teves Jr. of the Nationalist People's Coalition was expelled on August 16, 2023, after being implicated in the assassination of Negros Oriental governor Roel Degamo. A special election was scheduled to be held on December 9, 2023, but was cancelled due to concerns about the situation in the district and Teves' appeal against his expulsion in the Supreme Court.

Former Governor Roel Degamo's widow, Pamplona mayor Janice Degamo (Lakas–CMD), won the election against Teves' aunt, Janice Teves (Liberal Party), and Reynaldo Lopez (Independent).

Candidate	Party	Votes	%
Janice Degamo	Lakas–CMD	128,007	58.33
Janice Teves	Liberal Party	65,574	29.88
Reynaldo Lopez	Independent	25,867	11.79
Total		219,448	100.00
Valid votes		219,448	85.59
Invalid/blank votes		36,942	14.41
Total votes		256,390	100.00
Registered voters/turnout		308,907	83.00
Lakas gain from NPC			
Source: Commission on Elections

== Siquijor ==
Incumbent Zaldy Villa of Lakas–CMD ran for a second term. He was previously affiliated with PDP–Laban.

Villa won re-election against Siquijor vice governor Mimi Quezon (Aksyon Demokratiko) and Johnney Ensong (Independent).

Candidate	Party	Votes	%
Zaldy Villa (incumbent)	Lakas–CMD	41,221	56.98
Mimi Quezon	Aksyon Demokratiko	30,858	42.66
Johnney Ensong	Independent	264	0.36
Total		72,343	100.00
Valid votes		72,343	96.77
Invalid/blank votes		2,415	3.23
Total votes		74,758	100.00
Registered voters/turnout		81,404	91.84
Lakas hold			
Source: Commission on Elections
