= 2023 Negros Oriental's 3rd congressional district special election =

Special election for a Philippine House of Representatives seat

A special election would have been held in Negros Oriental's 3rd congressional district on December 9, 2023, to fill the district's vacant seat in the House of Representatives of the Philippines for the remainder of the 19th Congress.

The vacancy arose when the House of Representatives expelled the incumbent, Arnolfo Teves Jr. Teves had refused to return to the country after being tagged as the mastermind behind the assassination of the governor of Negros Oriental, Roel Degamo.

The Commission on Elections, which had previously scheduled the election upon receiving a resolution from the House of Representatives that the seat was vacant, canceled the election after receiving another resolution from the House urging them to reconsider holding the election.

== Electoral system ==
The House of Representatives is elected via parallel voting system, with 80% of seats elected from congressional districts, and 20% from the party-list system. Each district sends one representative to the House of Representatives. An election to the seat is via first-past-the-post, in which the candidate with the most votes, whether or not one has a majority, wins the seat.

Based on Republic Act (RA) No. 6645, for a special election to take place, the seat must be vacated, the relevant chamber notifies the Commission on Elections (COMELEC) the existence of a vacancy, then the COMELEC schedules the special election. There is a dispute in the procedure as a subsequent law, RA No. 7166, supposedly amended the procedure, bypassing the need for official communication from the relevant chamber of the vacancy. The COMELEC has always waited on official communication from the relevant chamber before scheduling a special election.

Meanwhile, according to RA No. 8295, should only one candidate file to run in the special election, the COMELEC will declare that candidate as the winner and will no longer hold the election.

== Background ==
Arnolfo Teves Jr. defended his House seat in the May 2022 elections. His brother, then Bayawan mayor Pryde Henry Teves, defeated incumbent Roel Degamo for governor of Negros Oriental. Degamo appealed his defeat, saying a third candidate, Ruel Degamo, caused confusion and took away his votes.

In October 2022, the Commission on Elections disqualified Ruel Degamo, allocating his votes to the defeated governor, allowing the latter to emerge as the candidate with the highest number of votes. The commission then proclaimed erstwhile governor Degamo as the actual winner. Governor Teves sought relief from the Supreme Court, but later relinquished the governorship later that month. In February 2023, the Supreme Court dismissed Teves's petition, affirming Degamo's victory.

On March 4, 2023, Degamo was assassinated by unknown assailants in his Pamplona residence. Aside from Degamo, nine other people died in the attack. Former members of the Armed Forces of the Philippines were implicated in the attack. Degamo's wife, Pamplona mayor Janice Degamo, said that the mastermind was "very known in the country today" but did not specify any name. The arrested suspects implicated a certain "Cong Teves" as the mastermind. In a privilege speech, TGP Partylist congressman Jose Teves Jr. denied he was the "Cong Teves" mentioned, saying that while he shared the surname, his family hails from Catanduanes and not Negros. Arnolfo Teves Jr. said that he could not be the mastermind, as he was undergoing stem cell treatments in the United States when the attack took place. Teves was previously cleared to travel abroad for a "personal trip", and it was set to expire on March 9, 2023.

On March 22, Teves was then unanimously suspended by the House of Representatives for 60 days; then he refused to return to the Philippines, citing threats to his life. In May 2023, Timor-Leste rejected Teves's request to seek political asylum in their country. Speaker Martin Romualdez urged Teves to come home, threatening additional disciplinary action if he doesn't do so. In another unanimous vote, he was then suspended for another 60 days. In July, the Teves brothers were designated as terrorists by the Anti-Terrorism Council.

Teves was expelled by the House on August 16, 2023, for "continued pursuit of political asylum," "indecent behavior" and "continued absence", becoming the first congressman to be expelled since the restoration of Congress in 1987. Only three lawmakers, all from the Makabayan bloc, abstained from the otherwise unanimous vote, citing the inclusion in the House committee report of Teves being designated as a terrorist by the Anti-Terrorism Council, of which its creation Makabayan opposes. According to House secretary general Reginald Velasco, Teves was the first legislator expelled without being convicted of a crime. The House then declared Teves's seat as vacant, seeking for a special election.

Later that month, the Department of Justice announced that they will file murder charges against Teves in a Manila Regional Trial Court (RTC) in relation to the Pamplona attack. A Manila RTC then issued a warrant of arrest against Teves and nine others in early September.

=== District profile ===
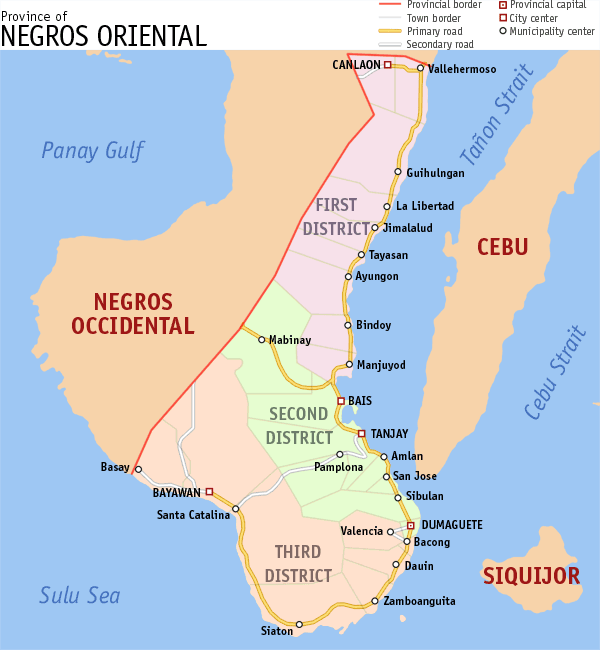
Negros Oriental divided into its congressional districts; the 3rd district is the southernmost district.

The district was created in the 1987, via an ordinance to the 1987 constitution; since then, it has never been redistricted, and that it has emerged as a stronghold of the Teveses, with Margarito Teves serving from 1987 until 1998, Margarito's father Herminio serving from 1998 until 2007, Herminio's grandson Pryde Henry served from 2007 until 2016, then finally Pryde Henry's brother Arnolfo Jr. serving from 2016 until his expulsion in 2023. All Teveses served three consecutive terms, the maximum allowed by the constitution.

== Preparation ==
After the House resolution was passed, COMELEC earlier said that they would not be able to hold the special election concurrently with the barangay and Sangguniang Kabataan (SK) elections in October due to time constraints. Instead, they were planning to hold the election in December. A week later, COMELEC announced that the special election would be on December 9, 2023, with the filing of candidacies from November 6 to 8. The filing deadline would later be extended to November 11.

At the time this election was called, there were a total of 301,264 registered voters in the district. The provincial Joint Peace and Security Coordinating Center plans to extend the preparations for the barangay and SK elections to the special election. The Philippine Army's 3rd Infantry Division, whose command area includes Negros Oriental, was ready to add more troops to the province if necessary.

== Candidates ==
The Degamo family plans to field a candidate for the position. Pamplona mayor Janice Degamo said that they are looking for ways to field just one candidate so as to prevent vote-splitting. Degamo says they have two potential candidates, both cousins of the slain governor. The mayor had herself ruled out being one of the candidates. Meanwhile, Pryde Henry Teves was also eyeing the seat he formerly held from 2007 to 2016.

The COMELEC has said that they are expecting mayor Degamo and former representative Teves to file their candidacies. Other potential candidates include Siaton mayor Fritz Diaz, and retired Philippine Navy colonel Reynaldo Lopez. Degamo was the then-mayor of Pamplona, a town in the 2nd district; she may be beset with residency issues if she runs for the 3rd district seat.

No one showed up on the first day of filing for candidacies on November 6. The COMELEC then extended the filing period, from November 8 to November 11. In case there are no candidates, the COMELEC will report this to the House of Representatives, which will then decide on what to do. On November 7, Lopez filed his candidacy as an independent. On the next day, Pryde Henry Teves and Bacong mayor Lenin Aviola filed their candidacies.

== Cancellation ==
On November 8, the Commission on Elections received a resolution from the House of Representatives urging the former "to reconsider its resolution for the conduct of the special election." Later in the day, the commission canceled the special election. Aside from the House resolution, the COMELEC cited an ongoing case filed by Arnolfo Teves Jr. to the Supreme Court questioning his expulsion. Manuel Sagarbarria Sr., the representative from the 2nd district and father of governor Manuel Sagarbarria Jr., authored the said resolution, citing the tense political climate in their province.

== Aftermath ==
In the 2025 general election, Janice Degamo filed her candidacy for representative under Lakas–CMD. She was opposed by Janice Teves Gaston, aunt of Teves, and Lopez, who ran as an independent. Pryde Henry Teves ran for governor under the Liberal Party, against incumbent governor Sagarbarria. Degamo won the congressional race, while Sagarbarria defeated Pryde Henry in the gubernatorial election.

On May 27, 2025, Arnie Teves was arrested by Timor-Leste authorities in his Dili residence. He was deported back to the Philippines two days later.

== 2022 results ==
2022 Philippine House of Representatives election in Negros Oriental's 3rd congressional district
Candidate	Party	Votes	%
Arnolfo Teves Jr.	Nationalist People's Coalition	91,482	48.99
Reynaldo Lopez	Nacionalista Party	87,684	46.96
Joan Estrella	PROMDI	4,779	2.56
Jocelyn Estrella	Independent	2,779	1.49
Total		186,724	100.00
Valid votes		186,724	76.31
Invalid/blank votes		57,979	23.69
Total votes		244,703	100.00
Nationalist People's Coalition hold			

== See also ==
- 1908 Manila's 1st Philippine Assembly district special elections, last special elections involving an expelled legislator
- 1914 Negros Oriental's 2nd Philippine Assembly district special election, last special election in Negros Oriental
