= List of organizations designated as terrorist by the Philippines =

The following are a list of organizations designated as terrorist in the Philippines by the Anti-Terrorism Council under the Anti-Terrorism Act of 2020 which was signed into law on July 3, 2020 by then former President Rodrigo Duterte. The implementing rules and regulations was approved by the ATC on October 14, 2020.

The 2020 law replaced the Human Security Act of 2007, under which only the Abu Sayyaf was officially declared as a terrorist group in 2015.

This excludes groups that are merely described as terrorists by political figures and groups outside this formal process, as well as organizations penalized for acts other than for terrorism explicitly.

== Groups ==
=== Islamic State ===
The ATC has tagged multiple local based groups in the Philippines in 2020 who have pledged allegiance to the militant Islamist group Islamic State based in Iraq and Syria using multiple United Nations Security Council resolutions to justify the designation including Resolution Nos. 1373 and 2253. One noted incident was the Marawi siege of 2017.

=== CPP-NPA ===
The triumvirate of the Communist Party of the Philippines (CPP), the New People's Army (NPA) and the National Democratic Front (NDF) have been waging a communist rebellion against the Philippine government since the 1960s. Prior to the Anti-Terrorism Act of 2020 the government has outlawed them via the Anti-Subversion Act of 1957 which was repealed on 1992. Communist rebels including the CPP-NPA-NDF have pejoratively labeled by the Philippine military as "communist terrorist groups" (CTGs).

President Rodrigo Duterte in December 2017 issued a proclamation declaring the CPP and NPA, but not the NDF, as terrorist groups. He cited the Terrorism Financing Prevention and Suppression Act of 2012, although a judicial affirmation was needed for the designation under the Human Security Act of 2007. A petition was filed in 2018. There was no judicial affirmation and the 2007 law was repealed and replaced by the Anti-Terrorism Act of 2020.

Under the Anti-Terrorism Act of 2020, the CPP and the NPA would be officially be designated as terrorist organizations by the ATC. The decision cited Duterte's proclamation in 2017 as well as the inclusion of the groups in terrorist list by the United States (Department of State list of Foreign Terrorist Organizations), European Union, Australia, United Kingdom, all in 2002; and New Zealand, in 2010. The ATC would include the NDF on June 23, 2021 stating that the group is an integral and inseparable part of the CPP–NPA.

The ATC cites 200 incidents recorded from December 2020 to August 2023 which it considers as constituting atrocities by the CPP-NPA. This includes the killing of 2021 Masbate City blast which killed youth footballer Kieth Absalon and his cousin via an improvised explosive device.

=== Teves Group ===
In 2023, the private armed group linked to Arnolfo Teves Jr. would be designated as a terrorist organization under the name "Teves Terrorist Group". The ATC would cite political violence in Negros Oriental which culminated with the Pamplona massacre which saw the killing of then-incumbent provincial governor Roel Degamo.

== List ==
Communist groups

- Communist Party of the Philippines (since 2020; Resolution No. 12)
- New People's Army (since 2020; Resolution No. 12)
- National Democratic Front (since 2021)

Islamist groups

- Abu Sayyaf
- Bangsamoro Islamic Freedom Fighters
- Hamas
- Islamic State of East Asia
- Maguid group
- Maute group
- Turaifie group

Other

- Teves Terrorist Group – alleged private army of Arnolfo Teves Jr. (since 2023)
