= 2023 Philippine barangay and Sangguniang Kabataan elections =

Philippine local elections

2023 Philippine barangay elections
- October 30, 2023

336,008 seats (42,001 barangay captains and 294,007 barangay councilors) Per barangay: 5 in the Sangguniang Barangay seats needed for a majority
- Registered: 67,839,861
Barangay captains	42,001
Barangay councilors	294,007
Liga ng mga Barangay National President before election
Eden Pineda
Elected Liga ng mga Barangay National President
Jessica Dy
- 2023 Philippine Sangguniang Kabataan elections
- October 30, 2023

336,008 seats (42,001 Sangguniang Kabataan chairpersons and 294,007 Sangguniang Kabataan councilors) Per barangay: 4 in the Sangguniang Kabataan seats needed for a majority
- Registered: 23,254,961
SK chairpersons	42,001
SK councilors	294,007

Barangay and Sangguniang Kabataan elections (BSKE) in the Philippines were held on October 30, 2023. The elections determined 42,001 barangay captains and 294,007 barangay councilors, for a total of 336,008 seats. Five seats in each Sangguniang Barangay (barangay council) were needed for a majority. Barangays are the smallest type of local government unit in the Philippines, and their governance is nonpartisan.

Elections for the local youth councils, Sangguniang Kabataan (SK), were held at the same time. The youth elected an SK chairperson and seven SK councilors in each barangay. The SK chairperson automatically served as an ex officio member of the Sangguniang Barangay. Members of the Sangguniang Barangay designated as Indigenous Peoples Mandatory Representatives (IPMRs) were not elected as part of the BSKE.

The elections were originally scheduled to be held in May 2020. In December 2019, a law was passed postponing the election to December 2022. In October 2022, another law was passed, this time postponing the election to October 2023. However, the Supreme Court declared this law unconstitutional. The election nevertheless proceeded on October 30, 2023. This resulted in elected officials being able to immediately assume office after being proclaimed, as their terms de jure began on January 1, 2023.

A plebiscite was also held on this day on the conversion of San Jose del Monte, Bulacan, from a component city to a highly urbanized city, which would have made it politically and fiscally independent from Bulacan. The measure was defeated, and San Jose del Monte remained a component city.

== Electoral system ==
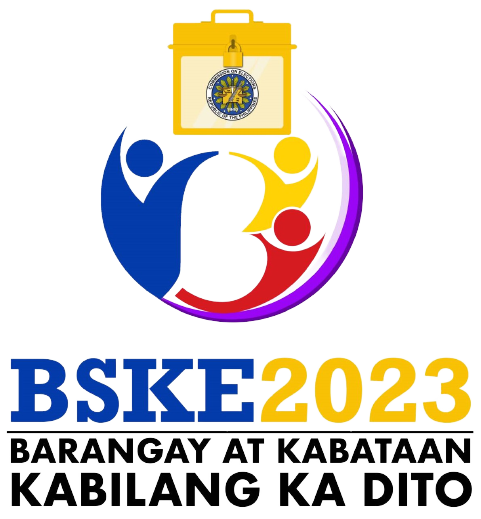
Logo for the 2023 BSKE used for public materials and election awareness campaigns.

Each barangay has an elected chief executive, the barangay captain, and an eight-seat legislature, the Sangguniang Barangay (transl. barangay council), of which seven are elected at-large in this election.

Voters aged 15 to 30 years old on election day also elect among themselves the Sangguniang Kabataan (transl. youth council; SK) chairperson in each barangay, who is the eighth member of the Sangguniang Barangay, and all seven members of the SK at-large.

Both the barangay captain and the SK chairperson are elected via the first-past-the-post system, while the legislatures are elected via multiple non-transferable votes.

Barangay-level elections are nonpartisan elections. Slates of candidates for barangay captain and seven councilors, and an SK chairman and SK councilors, are common; a slate of barangay and SK candidates may cross-endorse each other. Political parties allegedly clandestinely support their candidates despite the nonpartisan nature of the election.

Upon their election, barangay captains shall elect their cities' or municipalities' Liga ng mga Barangay (transl. league of the barangays) president, previously known and still known as the "Association of Barangay Captains" or ABC president, who also sits on their respective local municipal or city council. The municipal and city ABC presidents in a province shall elect among themselves a provincial ABC president who also sits on the provincial board. The provincial and independent city ABC chairmen shall elect among themselves the national leadership of the League.

Unlike the barangay captains, who have their own national federation, the SK chairpersons do not have such an equivalent body after its reformation in 2018.

== Preparation ==
=== Postponement ===
The November 2016 barangay and SK elections were postponed to May 2018, and the following election was scheduled for May 2020, then every three years thereafter.

==== Postponement to December 2022 ====
On September 30, 2019, the Senate of the Philippines passed a bill postponing the date of the barangay and Sangguniang Kabataan elections to December 5, 2022. The House of Representatives followed suit on November 4, 2019. Both bills were consolidated into one bill on November 11, 2019. The bill was signed by President Rodrigo Duterte on December 3, 2019.

==== Postponement to October 2023 ====
In January 2022, a bill was filed by Davao Oriental–2nd district representative Joel Almario seeking to postpone this election to 2024. In May 2022, then–presumptive vice president Sara Duterte agreed to postpone the barangay election to 2024 as a cost-saving measure. Outgoing Senate President Tito Sotto, meanwhile, said in jest that if the barangay elections were postponed again, the barangay officials would have a longer term of office than the president. Negros Occidental governor Eugenio Jose Lacson said that if it were postponed, it should have been postponed for only a year.

At the opening of the 19th Congress in late July, Leyte Rep. Richard Gomez filed a bill postponing the election to 2023, so that the cost of the holding the election, around 8 billion pesos, would have been used elsewhere. A Manila Times editorial questioned if the government would indeed save money, as the cost of the election would not be spent only on election day, and that the cost was already allocated in the national budget. Weeks later, the House Committee on Suffrage and Electoral Reforms approved the bill on second reading. COMELEC chairman George Garcia later said in Senate Committee on Electoral Reforms and People's Participation hearing that they would need an additional 18 billion pesos for them to hold the elections in December 2023, an increase from 5 billion pesos he earlier shared to the House committee, as it meant to cover increased honoraria for electoral board members. Postponing the elections would also lead to additional voter registration drives, which leads to more people being registered, which meant more ballots had to be printed, more voting centers to be opened, and more election materials to be bought, thus increasing the cost. The House committee then voted on second reading a substitute bill postponing to December 2023.

Further House committee hearings had Garcia suggesting to postpone to election to allow more voters to be registered. Representative from Albay Rep. Edcel Lagman said that "to postpone an election to accommodate more voters is never a reason for postponing an election. To me, this is strange." A representative from the Department of Budget and Management agreed with Garcia's earlier statement in regards to having a bigger budget if the elections were postponed to 2023.

On September 20, the House of Representatives overwhelmingly passed the bill postponing the election to December 2023 on third reading. Later that week, the Senate passed the bill on a 17–2 vote, with the dissenters solely coming from the minority bloc. On September 28, both chambers voted to ratify the bicameral conference committee version of the bill, largely based on the Senate version of the bill, that postpones the election to October 2023, and sets the term of office of barangay officials to three years.

On October 10, President Bongbong Marcos signed Republic Act No. 11935 which moved the date of barangay elections to the last Monday of October 2023.

A week later, election lawyer Romulo Macalintal filed a petition before the Supreme Court challenging the constitutionality of the said law. He argued Congress has no power to postpone the barangay elections and to extend the term of village officials, and it can only fix the term through a law.

In early March 2023, the commission released the calendar for the election, with the election period beginning at July 3. Later that month, the commission reset the election period, with it beginning now at August 28.

During the aftermath of the Pamplona massacre where Negros Oriental governor Roel Degamo was assassinated, several mayors, including Degamo's wife Janice, who is also mayor of Pamplona, called for the postponement of elections in their province. Separately, five of six provincial governors in the Bangsamoro also called for the election's postponement, at least after the decommissioning of combatants of the Moro Islamic Liberation Front after the failed ambush of Lanao del Sur governor Mamintal Adiong Jr.

In late June 2023, the Supreme Court struck down Republic Act (RA) 11935, the law postponing the election, as unconstitutional, declaring that "the law unconstitutionally exceeds the bounds of the Congress' power to legislate." The court allowed the upcoming elections to proceed, but stressed that the currently-serving officials' terms ended on December 31, 2022, as per RA 11462, which had been repealed by RA 11935. The court also ruled that the winning officials would serve only until 2025, with barangay elections being held in that year, and every three years thereafter.

In late August, COMELEC chairman George Garcia said that they were expected to release a decision on postponing elections in Negros Oriental and Bangsamoro in late September, or if it would place any locality under its direct control instead. The COMELEC then announced in September that while elections in Negros Oriental would be held as scheduled, it placed the entire province under COMELEC control.

=== League leadership ===
The national president of the Liga ng mga Barangay, Faustino Dy V of Isabela, resigned in 2019 to run for Congress. He was succeeded by Eden Pineda of Tacloban, and was expected to lead the league into the next elections.

=== Voter registration ===
Because of these elections' postponement, barangay residents who did not or were unable to register between August 1 and September 30, 2019, had the opportunity to enroll their names in the registration period for the 2022 national elections. The period began on January 20, 2020, and would have ended on September 30, 2021. Registration was suspended in some areas in Cavite, Laguna and Batangas due to the Taal Volcano eruption, and in Makilala, Cotabato, due to an earthquake.

On March 10, 2020, the Commission on Elections (COMELEC) suspended voter registration in the entire Philippines due to the COVID-19 pandemic in the country. The commission later stated on August 15 that voter registration would resume on September 1 in areas under "general community quarantine" or "modified general community quarantine". Areas under "enhanced community quarantine" and "modified enhanced community quarantine" had their registrations suspended.

On the eve of the end of registration, chairman Sheriff Abas announced that the commission approved extending registration from October 11 to 30 for voters in the Philippines. On the same day, President Duterte signed into law a registration extension for 30 days from when it was made effective.

After the 2022 general election was held, the COMELEC began preparing for the barangay election, as a postponement law was yet to be passed. As set by the COMELEC, voter registration resumed from July 4 to 23.

With another postponement of the elections which was supposed to be held in December 2022, the voter registration was set from December 12 to January 31, 2023.

=== Filing of candidacies ===
On March 22, 2023, the COMELEC set the filing of candidacies from August 28 to September 2. During the week of filing candidacies, COMELEC extended the filing of candidacies in some areas due to inclement weather. In Ilocos Norte, filing was extended until September 3, while for Metro Manila and Abra, it was extended until September 4. COMELEC announced that there were 96,962 candidates for barangay chairperson, 731,682 candidates for Sangguniang Barangay member, 92,774 candidates for Sangguniang Kabataan (SK) chairperson, and 493,069 candidates for SK membership; this was "definitely higher" than in 2018.

The COMELEC disqualified a barangay captain candidate in Barangay Cabas-an, Aroroy, Masbate due to a previous criminal conviction. The commission also disqualified two SK candidates in Barangay Magtangale, San Francisco, Surigao del Norte and in Barangay Malag-it, Calinog, Iloilo for being related to sitting officials in their localities. A candidate for barangay captain in Barangay Pualas, Don Carlos, Bukidnon was also disqualified for being previously dismissed by the Ombudsman.

President Bongbong Marcos declared election day as a special non-working holiday.

The COMELEC sent show cause orders to about 7,000 candidates, 30% of them running under the Sangguniang Kabataan, for premature campaigning. The commission said it filed 200 disqualification cases, as well.

=== Automation ===
The COMELEC announced that while the election was manually conducted, three barangays had automated elections: Barangays Zone II Poblacion and Paliparan III in Dasmariñas, Cavite, and Pasong Tamo in Quezon City. The commission intended to have automated barangay elections in 2026.

=== Early voting hour ===
The COMELEC also announced that early voting for senior citizens and persons with disabilities would be pilot tested in Muntinlupa and Naga, Camarines Sur. Under the scheme, qualified voters can vote between 5:00am and 7:00am on election day.

=== Special Geographic Area plebiscites ===
The Bangsamoro government planned to hold the plebiscite for the ratification of the bills converting the barangays of the Special Geographic Area in Cotabato province into eight new municipalities alongside the barangay and Sangguniang Kabataan elections. However such a plan was considered impossible by the Bangsamoro office of the Commission on Elections due to time constraints.

== Statistics ==
=== New barangays ===
As of August 2023, there are 42,001 barangays. The new barangays that contested for the first time are:

- Madilay-dilay in Tanay, Rizal, created after a successful plebiscite on July 28, 2018
- Lacnog West in Tabuk, Kalinga, created after a successful plebiscite on February 22, 2020
- New Canaan in Alabel, Sarangani, created after a successful plebiscite on August 20, 2022
- Barangays East, North, South, and West, in Ormoc, created after a successful plebiscite on October 8, 2022.
  - Barangays District 1 to 28 reorganized into three barangays namely Barangay East, South, and West
  - Barangay District 29 renamed as "Barangay North"
- Datu Dalidigan and Boganga II in Marawi, Lanao del Sur, created after a successful plebiscite on March 18, 2023.
- Barangays Muzon East, Muzon Proper, Muzon South, and Muzon West, in San Jose del Monte, Bulacan, created after a successful plebiscite on March 25, 2023.
- Aniban 1, Aniban 2, Kaingin Digman, Ligas 1, Mabolo, Maliksi 2, Mambog 2, Niog, Panapaan 2, Panapaan 4, Poblacion, Real, Salinas 2, Sinbanali, Talaba 1, Talaba 3, Zapote 1 and Zapote 2, in Bacoor, Cavite, created after a successful plebiscite on July 29, 2023.
  - 44 barangays reorganized to 18 barangays
  - Five barangays renamed

This was a decrease from the 41,948 barangays disputed in May 2018, and an additional 96 disputed in Marawi later that year.

=== Transfer and change of jurisdiction ===
After the resolution of the Makati vs. Taguig Supreme Court case over which city owns Fort Bonifacio, the former Makati barangays situated in Parcel 3 and 4 of PSU-2031, which are mostly the Embo barangays of Cembo, Comembo, East Rembo, Pembo, Pitogo, Post Proper Northside, Post Proper Southside, Rizal, South Cembo and West Rembo, were transferred by the COMELEC to Taguig, with filing of candidacies being done at the Taguig Convention Center instead of at Makati.

This shall also be the first elections of any sort for the new provinces of Maguindanao del Norte and Maguindanao del Sur, and for the new cities of Carmona in Cavite and Baliwag in Bulacan. Ballots in these localities were reprinted to reflect the changes.

=== Summary ===
As there are one barangay chairman and seven regular barangay councilors, and the same number of SK chairmen and councilors in each barangay, there shall be 42,001 barangay captains and SK chairmen each, and 294,007 regular Sangguniang Barangay and SK councilors' positions each, that shall be disputed to date.

Position	Seats up per barangay	2018 total	2023 total	Change from 2018	Candidates
Barangay captain	1	42,044	42,001	−43	96,962
Regular Sangguniang Barangay members	7	294,308	294,007	−301	731,682
Sangguniang Kabataan chairperson	1*	42,044	42,001	−43	92,774
Sangguniang Kabataan member	7	294,308	294,007	−301	493,069

*The SK chairman in a barangay serves as an ex officio member of the Sangguniang Barangay.

There were a total of 67,839,700 registered voters for the barangay elections, and 23,254,129 registered voters for the Sangguniang Kabataan elections.

The COMELEC placed 242 barangays as "areas of grave concern," 1,257 as "areas of immediate concern," and 1,077 as "areas of concern." The rest of the 39,425 barangays were tagged as "areas of no concern." More than half of the number of barangays that were areas of grave concern can be found in the Bangsamoro.

There were also 7,226 barangays with just one candidate for barangay captain, while 1,611 barangay councilor candidates were unopposed. In the SK, 8,057 chairpersons ran unopposed, 10,620 SK councilor positions were uncontested. Most of these were also found in the Bangsamoro. Another eight barangays did not have candidates for barangay captain, 124 had no candidates for SK chairperson, and 153 without candidates for SK member.

Three barangays are currently unpopulated, all on Taal Volcano Island, Barangays Alas-as and Pulang Bato in San Nicolas, and Calawit in Balete, all in Batangas, due to the 2020–2022 Taal Volcano eruptions. San Nicolas mayor Lester de Sagun questioned the holding of elections in those two barangays as it has been unpopulated for three years. The incumbent barangay officials argued that while they might not be residing in the barangay's territory, their constituents still need their services. San Nicolas vice mayor Napoleon Arceo said that these barangays were previously abolished due to an eruption in 1965, but residents subsequently returned.

== Campaigning ==
Campaigning officially began on October 19, 2023. The COMELEC took down illegal campaign materials starting on the first day as well, with operations done in Quezon City. Around 700 pieces of illegal campaign materials were also taken down in Koronadal. The COMELEC also confirmed over 100 incidents of vote-buying. The COMELEC decided to suspend proclamation of winning candidates who had pending cases of vote-buying, premature and illegal campaigning.

With the earlier decision of the Supreme Court from which this election should had been held in 2022 and that the incumbents were in mere hold-over capacity, the COMELEC ruled, after it was asked for advice by the Department of the Interior and Local Government, that winning candidates, upon taking the oath of office, "may immediately and effectively assume office".

The Philippine National Police (PNP) reported 23 incidents of election-related violence; this was after verification where 129 were originally reported, but 77 were found to be unrelated to the elections. Bangsamoro had the most cases, with 5, including the killing of the family of a barangay captain candidate in Barangay Sigpang in Kapatagan, Lanao del Sur. Campaigning ended on October 28, with the PNP reinforcing their numbers in Abra as there were reports of several candidates withdrawing due to intimidation.

== Results ==
Results were expected on the night of October 30. Barangay and SK elections are nonpartisan elections, and campaigning is done at the barangay level.

Prior to voting, a shooting killed two people and injured four in Datu Odin Sinsuat, Maguindanao del Norte. Another shooting was recorded in Butig, Lanao del Sur. Two died, including a former barangay captain, and a voter. In Bacolod, Lanao del Norte, a candidate for barangay captain and his followers were ambushed; the niece of the candidate's husband died. The police stated that there were 31 incidents of violence from during the campaign period.

In Puerto Princesa, a group of supporters tore down ballots, disrupting the election. In Buadiposo-Buntong, Lanao del Sur, voting was delayed as ballots did not arrive in time for election day.

Three barangays in Bayang, Lanao del Sur, and two barangays in Calbayog, Samar, voted on October 31. In Bayang, voting materials were not distributed on time, while in Calbayog, insurgents fired upon COMELEC officials delivering voting materials.

The COMELEC declared the elections as generally peaceful with no failure of elections declared It also cited the Philippine National Police record of 29 validated election-related incidents which resulted in 19 deaths. Most of these were in the Bangsamoro region.

However, election watchdog Council for Climate and Conflict Action Asia (CCAA) concludes that this was the "bloodiest" election in the Bangsamoro region in the last ten years based on 200 reports it collected. It also noted that 2,000 teachers in the region did not show up to fulfill their election duties. The COMELEC refutes this stating that the CCAA included non-election related incidents.

The COMELEC announced the success of "early voting hour" in Muntinlupa. The National Citizens' Movement for Free Elections also saw no issues with the automated elections done in Dasmariñas.

COMELEC chairman George Garcia announced that on November 1, all positions had declared winners, except for "the ones ordered suspended by the Commission and (those in) areas where the electoral board availed itself of the five-day notice rule". In multiple places, coin tosses were done for tied contests. The law allows for "drawing of lots" to settle ties, with coin tosses being an acceptable variant. By November 2, 92 candidates had their proclamations as winners as suspended due to pending cases.

=== Barangay elections ===
Results	Total	%
Candidates for barangay captain	96,562	100%
Barangay captains elected	42,001	43.32%
Candidates for member of Sangguniang Barangay	731,682	100%
Sangguniang Barangay members elected	294,007	40.18%
Voter turnout		75.76%
Registered voters	67,839,861	100%

=== Sangguniang Kabataan elections ===
Results	Total	%
Candidates for Sangguniang Kabataan chairperson	92,774	100%
Sangguniang Kabataan chairpersons elected	42,001	45.27%
Candidates for member of Sangguniang Kabataan	493,069	100%
Sangguniang Kabataan members elected	294,007	59.63%
Voter turnout		76.08%
Registered voters	23,254,961	100%

== Aftermath ==
Senator Nancy Binay asked the Department of the Interior and Local Government to clarify the rules on the elections for the Liga ng mga Barangay (LnB) and Sangguniang Kabataan, saying that these should be free from political influence.

For the national elections for the national federation of the Liga ng mga Barangay (LnB). Secretary of the Interior and Local Government Benjamin Abalos Jr. initially ordered the exclusion of league members who had unpaid dues, but reversed his ordered and concurred with the LnB allowing members with unpaid dues to participate. The LnB then said that its presidents from the municipal and city chapters shall take office on January 2, 2024, its provincial chapters on January 29, 2024, and for the national federation on April 15, 2024.

Jessica Dy from Barangay San Fabian, Echague, Isabela, was elected national president of the league.

== San Jose del Monte conversion plebiscite ==
Aside from the barangay elections, a plebiscite in Bulacan was held to determine if San Jose del Monte, a component city of the province, should become a highly urbanized city, which, if approved, would effectively make the city independent from the province. The provincial chapter of the Liga ng mga Barangay was against the proposal, while the provincial chapter of the Mayors' League and all six House representatives were for it. The National Movement of Young Legislators Bulacan Chapter was also for the proposal. The governor of Bulacan, Daniel Fernando, remarked that "no father is happy when he sees his child leave," but left the choice to the people.

The majority of voters in Bulacan rejected the proposal, as declared by COMELEC on November 1, two days after the plebiscite. In San Jose del Monte itself, the proposal was narrowly rejected.
