= List of members of the Philippine House of Representatives expelled, removed, or suspended =

The following is a list of members of the Philippine House of Representatives who were expelled, censured, removed, (Note: Excluding those who were removed through a voluntary act (i.e. resignation).) and suspended.

== Expelled representatives ==
The House of Representatives can remove an erring member through a two-thirds majority vote according to Section 143 of its rules. Arnolfo Teves Jr. is the first representative to have been removed through this manner. On June 2, 2026, the House also ousted Kiko Barzaga.

Date	Portrait	Representative	Expulsion vote (Note: For, negative, and abstention votes)	Notes
February 1, 1908		Dominador Gómez (Nacionalista, Manila's 1st district)	40–35	Legal controversies including a contested citizenship status and past labor-related sedition charges, heavily fueled by a political power struggle with the Philippine Assembly leadership. At the time, only a majority of members were needed to expel a member.
August 16, 2023		Arnolfo Teves Jr. (NPC, Negros Oriental's 3rd district)	265–0–3	Abandonment of his role as representative through persistent absence and seeking political asylum in East Timor; designation as terrorist by the government; posting of a video of himself dancing in a tank top and boxer shorts in social media. Teves was implicated in the Pamplona massacre which included the assassination of Negros Oriental governor Roel Degamo.
June 2, 2026		Kiko Barzaga (PDP–Laban, Cavite's 4th district)	265–14–8	Expelled due to double suspensions, and for disorderly conduct. Many ethics complaint were filed against him. He was suspended two times, so he was subjected to expulsion.

== Censured representatives ==
The House of Representatives can censure or reprimand an erring member through a majority vote through Section 143 of its rules. Pantaleon Alvarez is the sole representative to have been censured through this manner.

Date	Portrait	Representative	Censure vote (Note: For, negative, and abstention votes)	Notes
May 22, 2024		Pantaleon Alvarez (Reporma, Davao del Norte’s 1st district)	186–5-7	For alleged seditious remarks in calling on the Armed Forces of the Philippines and the Philippine National Police to withdraw their support for President Bongbong Marcos.

== Removed representatives ==
The following representatives were removed or is said to have been "removed from the roll of members".

Year	Portrait	Representative	Reason	Notes
1925		Miguel Cornejo (Independent, Mountain Province's at-large district)	Criminal conviction	Removed following his conviction for assaulting an American.
2002		Romeo Jalosjos Sr. (Lakas–NUCD, Zamboanga del Norte's 1st district)	Criminal conviction	Jalosjos' conviction for raping a 11-year-old girl in 1996 was upheld by the Supreme Court in 2002 with finality paving the way for his removal from the lower house.
2012		Ruben Ecleo Jr. (Lakas–CMD, Dinagat Islands's at-large district)	Criminal conviction	Ecleo's conviction for graft and corruption was ruled in finality.
2018		Eugene de Vera (ABS; Party-list)	Expulsion from party-list	De Vera was expelled from the Arts, Business, and Science Professionals party-list.
2019		Jose Antonio Lopez (Marino, Party-list)	Resignation from party-list	Lopez resigned from Marino Party List after a disqualification suit based on his citizenship was filed against him.
2023		Nicolas Enciso VIII (Bicol Saro, Party-list)	Expulsion from party-list	Enciso was expelled from Bicol Saro party-list.
2023		Bem Noel (An Waray, Party-list)	Partylist disqualification	The Commission on Elections disqualified the An Waray for allegedly violating the party-list law, consequentially unseating first nominee Bem Noel from the lower house.

== Suspended representatives ==
Year	Portrait	Representative	Reason
1960		Sergio Osmena Jr. (Nacionalista, Cebu's 2nd district)	For accusing President Carlos P. Garcia of bribery and failure to provide sufficient proof for the allegation. On July 17, Osmeña was suspended for 15 months by a vote of 72 to 8.
1989		Nicanor de Guzman Jr. (Lakas ng Bansa, Nueva Ecija's 4th district)	For smuggling 314 firearms into Ninoy Aquino International Airport. Later voluntarily resigned in 1990 after his conviction.
2023		Arnolfo Teves Jr. (NPC, Negros Oriental's 3rd district)	Suspended three times, Teves was implicated in the Pamplona massacre, the assassination of Negros Oriental governor Roel Degamo although officially this is not the reason for his suspension. He had been outside the country since the event causing him to unable to fulfill his duties and has sought political asylum in East Timor.
2025		Kiko Barzaga (Independent, Cavite's 4th district)	Suspended two times, Barzaga engaged in disorderly behavior, posting on his social media platforms.
2026		Jojo Ang (Uswag Ilonggo, Party-list)	Suspended for 90 days by the Sandiganbayan as a preventative measure after he was charged with two counts of graft over alleged conflict of interest in infrastructure projects.
2026		Martin Romualdez (Lakas–CMD, Leyte's 1st district)	Suspended for 90 days by the Sandiganbayan as a preventative measure due to his ongoing trial for plunder over the Flood control projects scandal.
