= Basay, Negros Oriental =

Municipality in Negros Oriental, Philippines

Basay
- Municipality
- Municipality of Basay
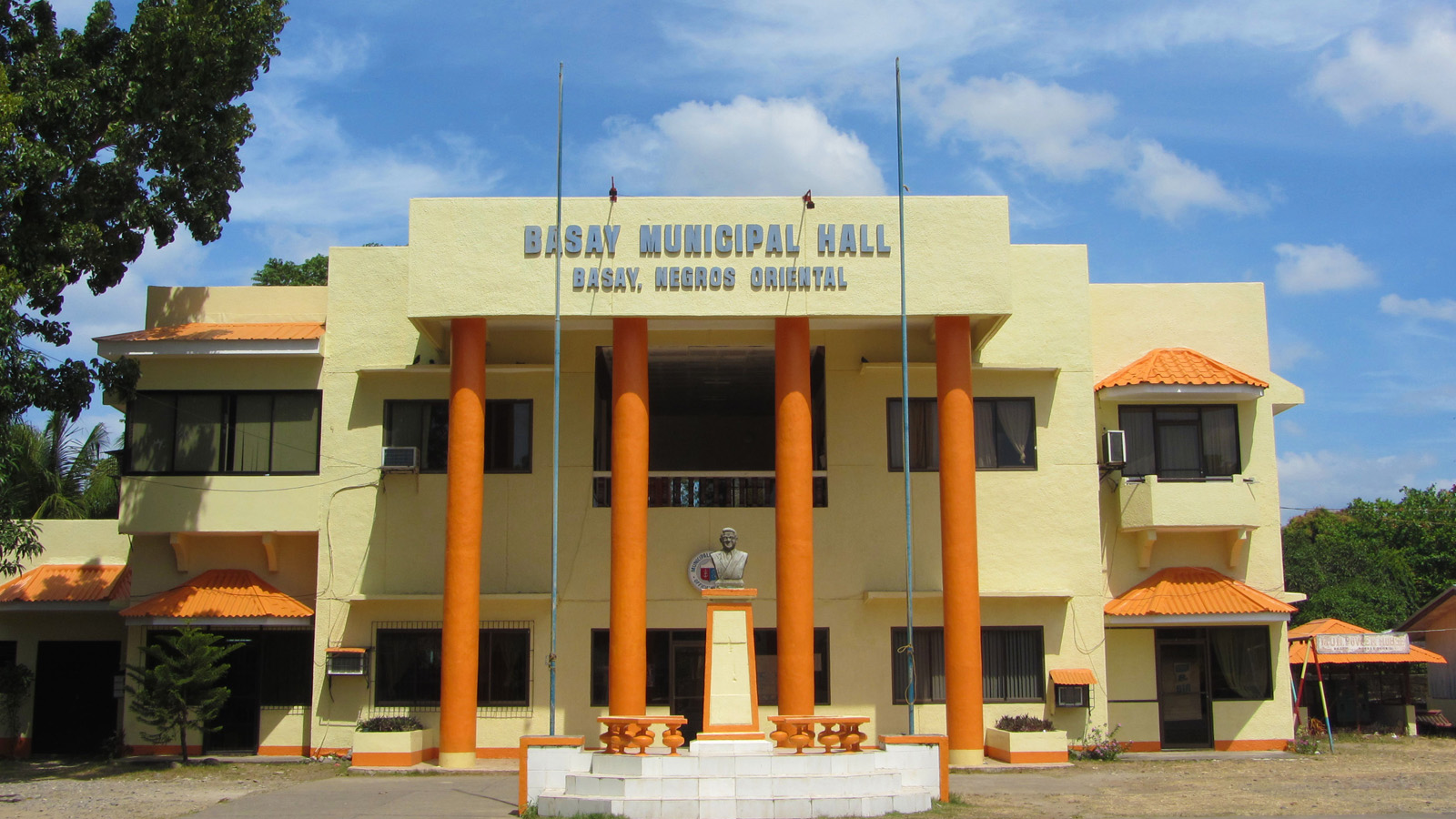
- Municipal Hall

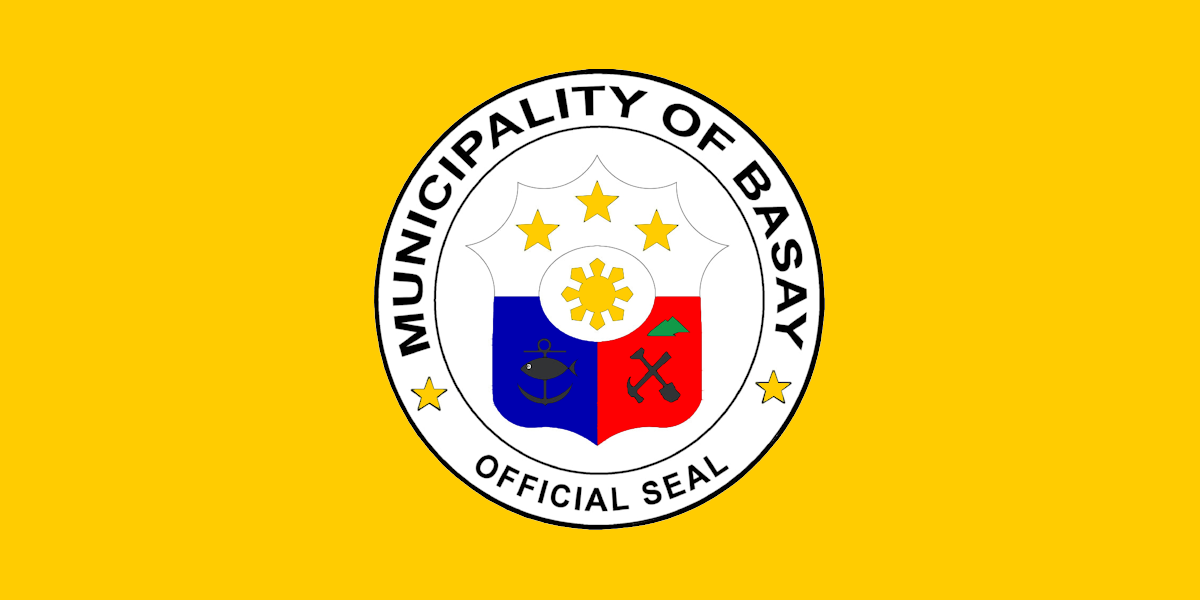
- Flag

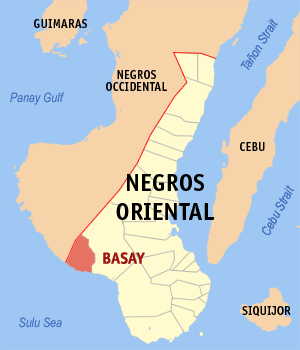
- Map of Negros Oriental with Basay highlighted
- Interactive map of Basay
- Location within the Philippines
- Coordinates: 9°25′N 122°38′E
- Country: Philippines
- Region: Negros Island Region
- Province: Negros Oriental
- District: 3rd district
- Founded: June 15, 1968
- Named for: Visayan term "busay", meaning "spring"
- Barangays: 10 (see Barangays)

Government
  - Type: Sangguniang Bayan
  - Mayor: Jonny A. Wagas (Lakas)
  - Vice Mayor: Nelie M. Gabas (Ind)
  - Representative: Janice Degamo (Lakas)
  - Municipal Council: Members: Mikle Vito M. Abing; Darren Philip J. Nipshagen; Pristine Joy Kharlysel Y. Abrio; Venrol John V. Bendijo; Beda Brent E. Cañamaque; Jose Manuel U. Montebon; Charita A. Tangon; Marl Felred A. Actub; Reymond June Rey Babor ^{◌}; ◌ ex officio SK chairman
  - Electorate: 22,235 voters (2025)

Area
  - Total: 162.00 km^{2} (62.55 sq mi)
- Elevation: 74 m (243 ft)
- Highest elevation: 686 m (2,251 ft)
- Lowest elevation: 0 m (0 ft)

Population (2024 census)
  - Total: 30,018
  - Density: 185.30/km^{2} (479.92/sq mi)
  - Households: 6,984

Economy
  - Income class: 3rd municipal income class
  - Poverty incidence: 33.42% (2023)
  - Revenue: ₱ 190.8 million (2024)
  - Assets: ₱ 514.5 million (2024)
  - Expenditure: ₱ 108.7 million (2024)
  - Liabilities: ₱ 166.1 million (2024)

Service provider
  - Electricity: Negros Oriental 2 Electric Cooperative (NORECO 2)
- Time zone: UTC+8 (PST)
- ZIP code: 6222
- PSGC: 074605000
- IDD : area code: +63 (0)35
- Native languages: Cebuano; Tagalog; Hiligaynon

Basay, officially the Municipality of Basay (/bɑːˈsaɪ/ bah-SY; Cebuano: Lungsod sa Basay; Hiligaynon: Banwa sang Basay; Tagalog: Bayan ng Basay), is a municipality in the province of Negros Oriental, Philippines. According to the 2024 census, it has a population of 30,018 people.

== Etymology ==
The name stems from the abundance of natural springs in the area, which are locally called "busay." The name was later changed from "Busay" to "Basay" during the Spanish era for unknown reasons.

== History ==
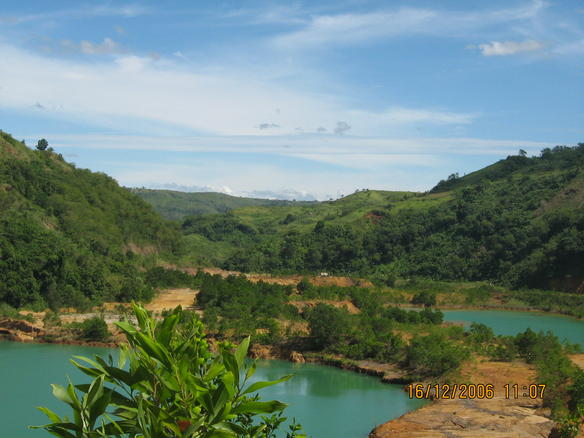
Man-made twin lagoons in Barangay Maglinao

Basay was created under the Republic Act No. 5491, which was signed in 1968. Upon its separation from Bayawan in 1971, Basay became Oriental Negros’ westernmost town, with Negros Occidental at its rear. Diocesan chronicles reveal that it was already a far-flung outpost in the nineteenth century. It perked up in the 70s when CDCP and INKO arrived to mine its copper and iron magnetite.

Basay is agricultural, with sugar cane, rice, corn and copra as major crops. Fringing its shoreline is the Mindanao Sea, considered the richest fishing waters in the country.

Three major rivers running parallel from north to south traverse the town. Balatong Point, also known as Punta Tambongon, was the landing site of a submarine bearing the biggest shipment of WWII ammunition for Negros Oriental. The party was headed by Col Jesus Villamor, acting on the personal direction of Gen Douglas MacArthur who was then in Australia.

The coves and shallow caves on the shoreline of Nagbo-alao are said to be enchanted. The Negros cave frog is endemic to Basay. Its Pagatban River is home to the alligator. Bal-os and Cabcaban springs are important sources of potable water as well as sunny picnic sites. Yardahan is a fishing village with fine swimming areas and game-fishing activities.

== Geography ==
Basay is located in the south of Negros Island on the coast of the Sulu Sea. Basay is 122 kilometres (76 mi) from Dumaguete and 219 kilometres (136 mi) from Bacolod. It is approximately a two-hour-and-a-half drive from Dumaguete.

=== Barangays ===
Basay is politically subdivided into 10 barangays. Each barangay consists of puroks and some have sitios.

| PSGC | Barangay | Population | | | ±% p.a. | |
| | | 2024 | | 2010 | | |
|---|---|---|---|---|---|---|
| 074605001 | Actin | 8.0% | 2,407 | 2,391 | ▴ | 0.05% |
| 074605002 | Bal-os | 13.9% | 4,172 | 3,225 | ▴ | 1.81% |
| 074605003 | Bongalonan | 13.9% | 4,185 | 3,742 | ▴ | 0.78% |
| 074605004 | Cabalayongan | 2.9% | 878 | 1,110 | ▾ | −1.62% |
| 074605005 | Cabatuanan | 3.2% | 967 | 741 | ▴ | 1.87% |
| 074605006 | Linantayan | 2.8% | 834 | 1,250 | ▾ | −2.78% |
| 074605007 | Maglinao | 10.7% | 3,216 | 2,807 | ▴ | 0.95% |
| 074605008 | Nagbo-alao | 18.5% | 5,546 | 4,050 | ▴ | 2.21% |
| 074605009 | Olandao | 3.7% | 1,119 | 1,094 | ▴ | 0.16% |
| 074605010 | Poblacion | 17.3% | 5,207 | 4,503 | ▴ | 1.02% |
| | Total | | 30,018 | 24,913 | ▴ | 1.31% |

=== Climate ===
Climate data for Basay, Negros Oriental
| Month | Jan | Feb | Mar | Apr | May | Jun | Jul | Aug | Sep | Oct | Nov | Dec | Year |
|---|---|---|---|---|---|---|---|---|---|---|---|---|---|
| Mean daily maximum °C (°F) | 31 (88) | 31 (88) | 32 (90) | 33 (91) | 31 (88) | 30 (86) | 29 (84) | 29 (84) | 29 (84) | 29 (84) | 30 (86) | 30 (86) | 30 (87) |
| Mean daily minimum °C (°F) | 22 (72) | 22 (72) | 22 (72) | 24 (75) | 25 (77) | 25 (77) | 25 (77) | 25 (77) | 25 (77) | 25 (77) | 24 (75) | 23 (73) | 24 (75) |
| Average precipitation mm (inches) | 46 (1.8) | 45 (1.8) | 56 (2.2) | 83 (3.3) | 163 (6.4) | 203 (8.0) | 236 (9.3) | 204 (8.0) | 210 (8.3) | 211 (8.3) | 143 (5.6) | 77 (3.0) | 1,677 (66) |
| Average rainy days | 12.1 | 9.8 | 14.3 | 17.5 | 26.0 | 27.8 | 28.4 | 26.9 | 26.7 | 27.9 | 23.3 | 17.2 | 257.9 |
Source: Meteoblue (Use with caution: this is modeled/calculated data, not measured locally.)

== Demographics ==
Population census of Basay
| Year | Pop. | ±% p.a. |
|---|---|---|
| 1970 | 8,235 | — |
| 1975 | 13,974 | +11.19% |
| 1980 | 21,637 | +9.13% |
| 1990 | 17,736 | −1.97% |
| 1995 | 18,500 | +0.79% |
| 2000 | 21,366 | +3.14% |
| 2007 | 22,713 | +0.85% |
| 2010 | 24,913 | +3.42% |
| 2015 | 26,566 | +1.23% |
| 2020 | 28,531 | +1.51% |
| 2024 | 30,018 | +1.23% |
Source: Philippine Statistics Authority

=== Languages ===
Cebuano is the dominant language of Basay, followed by Hiligaynon.

The town is home to the highly significant Magahat language, the indigenous language of Southern Negros as listed by the Komisyon ng Wikang Filipino. The language is vital to the culture and arts of the people.

== Economy ==
Poverty incidence of Basay

Source: Philippine Statistics Authority

== Education ==
The public schools in the town of Basay are administered by one school district under the Schools Division of Bayawan City.

Elementary schools:

- Basay Central School — Burgos Street, Poblacion
- Bongalonan Elementary School — Bongalonan
- Cabalayongan Elementary School — Sitio Cansan-a, Cabalayongan
- Cabatuanan Elementary School — Cabatuanan
- Cabigti-an Elementary School — Sitio Cabigti-an, Maglinao
- Cleomenes Consolacion Fortugaleza Memorial Elementary School (formerly Actin ES) — Actin
- Datag Elementary School — Sitio Datag, Maglinao
- Don Pablo Carmen Blanco Utzurrum Memorial Elementary School — Nagbo-alao
- Linantayan Elementary School — Linantayan
- Maglinao Elementary School — Maglinao
- Monsale Elementary School — Bal-os
- Olandao Elementary School — Olandao
- Tiabanan Valley Elementary School — Sitio Sandig, Bongalonan

High schools:

- Andres V. Fortugaleza National High School (formerly Actin NHS) — Actin
- Bal-os National High School — Bal-os
- Basay National High School — Sitio Daro, Nagbo-alao
- Maglinao National High School — Maglinao
