= Agustin Perdices =

Filipino politician (1934–2011)

The Honourable Agustin M. Perdices

19th Governor of Negros Oriental
- In office June 30, 2010 – January 5, 2011
- Vice Governor: Roel Degamo
- Preceded by: Jose Baldado
- Succeeded by: Roel Degamo

Mayor of Dumaguete
- In office June 30, 1992 – June 30, 1998
- Succeeded by: Felipe Antonio Remollo
- In office June 30, 2001 – June 30, 2010
- Preceded by: Felipe Antonio Remollo
- Succeeded by: Manuel T. Sagarbarria

Personal details
- Born: Agustin Ramon Miciano Perdices; October 16, 1934 Dumaguete
- Died: January 5, 2011 (Aged 76) Taguig, Metro Manila
- Occupation: Politician

Agustin Ramon Miciano Perdices (October 16, 1934 – January 5, 2011), fondly known as Tuting, was a Filipino politician. He served as the mayor of the city of Dumaguete from 1992 to 1998 and again from 2001 to 2010 before being elected vice governor of Negros Oriental in the gubernatorial election of May 2010. However, the vice-governor-elect found himself governor-elect of Negros Oriental following the death of the just re-elected incumbent governor, Emilio Macias II, from liver cancer on June 13, 2010. Outgoing Vice Governor Jose Baldado took over as governor during the remaining days of Macias's term before Perdices then officially took the post of governor on June 30, 2010.

In November, just five months after taking office, Governor Perdices announced that he had been diagnosed with stomach cancer. He died at St. Luke's Global City Hospital in Taguig at 5 p.m. on January 5, 2011, at the age of 76.
