= Arnie Teves =

Filipino politician and businessman (born 1971)

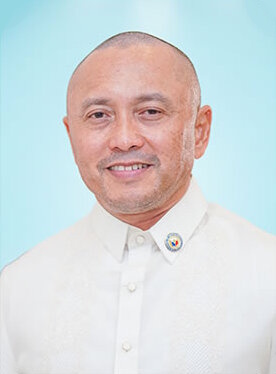
- Official portrait, 2022

Deputy Speaker of the House of Representatives of the Philippines
- In office December 7, 2020 – June 1, 2022 Serving with several others
- House Speaker: Lord Allan Velasco

Member of the House of Representatives from Negros Oriental's 3rd district
- In office June 30, 2016 – August 16, 2023
- Preceded by: Pryde Henry Teves
- Succeeded by: Janice Degamo

Member of the Negros Oriental Provincial Board
- In office January 1, 2011 – June 30, 2016; Ex officio as Liga ng mga Barangay provincial president
Barangay positions
President of the Liga ng mga Barangay of Negros Oriental
In office
December 17, 2010 – June 29, 2016
Barangay Captain of Malabugas, Bayawan
In office
October 25, 2010 – June 29, 2016

Personal details
- Born: Arnolfo Alipit Teves Jr. August 10, 1971 (age 54) Bayawan, Negros Oriental, Philippines
- Party: NPC (2015–2016; 2021–present)
- Other political affiliations: PDP–Laban (2016–2021); Independent (2010–2015)
- Relations: Herminio Teves (grandfather); Margarito Teves (half-uncle); Pryde Henry Teves (brother); Lorenzo Teves (granduncle); Rajo Laurel (half-cousin); Boboy Garrovillo (first-cousin-once-removed)
- Occupation: Politician

Arnolfo "Arnie" Alipit Teves Jr. (born August 10, 1971) is a Filipino politician and businessman. He most recently served as the Representative of Negros Oriental's 3rd district from 2016 until his expulsion in 2023. He also served as a deputy speaker from 2020 to 2022 in the 18th Congress.

Born into a political family from Negros Oriental, Teves entered politics in 2010 as the barangay captain of Malabugas in Bayawan. As president of the province's Liga ng mga Barangay, he served as an ex officio member of the Negros Oriental Provincial Board from 2011 to 2016. In the 2016 elections, he won the congressional seat vacated by his younger brother, Pryde Henry. In the House of Representatives, Teves supported the war on drugs and the shutdown of ABS-CBN.

On March 4, 2023, Negros Oriental governor Roel Degamo was assassinated. Two of the arrested suspects named a certain "Cong. Teves" as the mastermind of the killing. Teves had a political rivalry with Degamo but denied his involvement in the killing and was abroad at that time. Teves refused to return to the Philippines, citing a "very grave threat" to his life and his family. After initially suspending him, the House of Representatives unanimously expelled Teves in August 2023, making him the first congressman to be expelled since the establishment of the Fifth Republic (1986). Later that month, the Department of Justice filed murder charges against Teves, and a warrant for his arrest was issued by a Manila court. The Anti-Terrorism Council also designated him a terrorist, and an Interpol Red Notice was issued for him. In March 2024, Teves was arrested by local police in Timor-Leste, where he had attempted to seek political asylum. He was released in June 2024, but his extradition to the Philippines was being processed. He was later deported from Timor-Leste in May 2025.

== Political career ==
=== Barangay politics (2010–2016) ===
Teves entered politics in the 2010 barangay elections when he was elected barangay captain of Malabugas in Bayawan, Negros Oriental. He was also elected unopposed as president of the Liga ng mga Barangay (lit. 'League of Barangays') in Negros Oriental later that year, making him an ex officio member of the Negros Oriental Provincial Board.

=== House of Representatives (2016–2023) ===
In 2016, Teves was elected member of the House of Representatives representing the Negros Oriental's 3rd congressional district, effectively resigning from his posts as barangay captain and ABC President upon assuming office. He was re-elected in 2019 and in 2022.

Teves has expressed support for Duterte's war on drugs, proposing an inexpensive rehabilitation program for drug dependents, and stating that he himself "was a very long time a drug addict" but has been "clean for the last 16 plus years" as of 2016.

In 2018, Camarines Sur 2nd District Representative L-ray Villafuerte asked Teves to explain his alleged link to illegal e-gambling platforms. That same year, Teves also figured in an argument with Philippine Charity Sweepstakes Office board member Sandra Cam after she accused him of controlling gambling operations in his province.

On September 17, 2020, Teves challenged L-ray Villafuerte to a fistfight and dropped homophobic slurs to refer to Villafuerte after the former questioned the budget allocation of the Department of Public Works and Highways (DPWH) to various congressional districts in the country, particularly the funds allocated to the localities of Villafuerte and House Speaker Alan Peter Cayetano. He also verbally feuded with Villafuerte during a coup in the House of Representatives in October, during which Cayetano was removed as speaker by a majority of legislators and replaced with Lord Allan Velasco, whom Teves was a close ally.

Teves also tried to push Paolo Duterte to unseat Cayetano as Speaker.

Teves is one of the 70 representatives who voted to deny the ABS-CBN franchise on July 10, 2020. He also criticized ABS-CBN's joint venture with Prime Media, a media company owned by House Speaker Martin Romualdez in 2023.

In the 19th Congress, Teves filed a bill seeking to rename Ninoy Aquino International Airport to Ferdinand E. Marcos International Airport in honor of former President Ferdinand Marcos. Aquino was assassinated in 1983 at the airport during the Marcos dictatorship. Teves's justification for the proposal, where he stated that the airport was constructed during the term of the late dictator, was deemed false by media and fact checking organizations.

Teves also filed a bill seeking to declare ghosting as an emotional offense without suggesting any penalties, instead stating that it "should be punished."

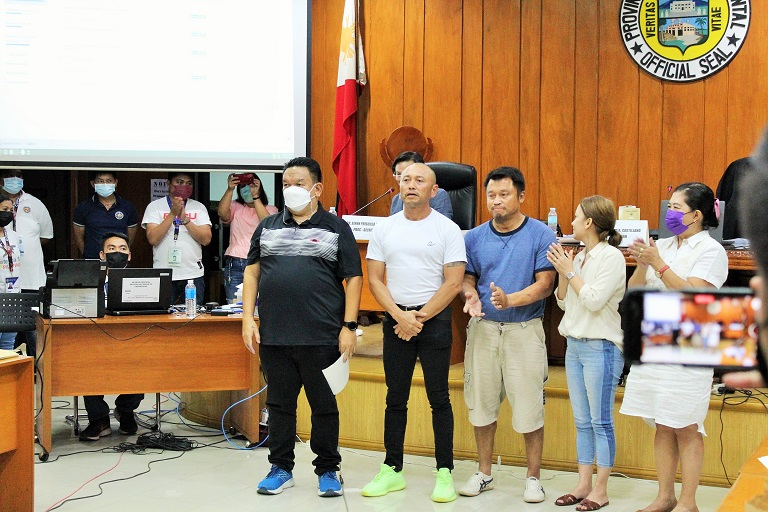
Teves in Dumaguete in 2022 (front, second from left)

=== Expulsion ===
On August 16, 2023, as he was being sought for the murder of Negros Oriental governor Roel Degamo, Teves was unanimously expelled by the House of Representatives due to his abandonment of duty, prolonged absence, and "indecent behavior on social media." With this, he became the first expelled representative since the restoration of the Congress in 1987. In response, his lawyer Ferdinand Topacio called the body a "kangaroo court".

Following his expulsion, the Commission on Elections announced that a special election would be held to choose his successor on December 9, 2023. However, on November 8, the body cancelled the elections following a resolution from the House of Representatives which cited concerns about the situation in the district and an appeal by Teves against his expulsion in the Supreme Court. In the 2025 Philippine House of Representatives elections, Teves was succeeded by Degamo's widow, Janice, who defeated Teves' aunt Janice.

== Murder cases ==
=== 2019 killing of Miguel Lopez Dungog ===
Negros Oriental Provincial Board member Miguel Lopez Dungog was shot dead outside the Silliman Medical Center in Dumaguete in 2019. Teves along with Richard Cuadra and Rolando Pinili were charged with murder for Dungog's killing. In January 2026, the three suspects were acquitted from charges due to insufficient evidence from the prosecution.

=== Pamplona massacre ===
On March 4, 2023, one month after the Supreme Court proclaimed Roel Degamo as governor of Negros Oriental in a contested election versus Arnolfo Teves' brother, former governor Pryde Henry Teves, Degamo was assassinated in his home in Pamplona, Negros Oriental. Eleven suspects were arrested by the police in multiple operations across the province. Two of the suspects named a certain 'Cong Teves' as the mastermind in an ambush interview with the media. Teves has denied any involvement in his death, criticizing those who had tried to accuse him and citing that the Teves's have nothing to gain. He has been on medical leave in the United States since February 28, and in March 15, has requested for a two-month leave, citing a "very grave threat" to his life and his family.

On March 22, 2023, the House of Representatives unanimously voted to suspend Teves for failing to return to the country despite having an expired travel clearance. The travel authority issued to Teves was valid only between February 28 and March 9. Suspension lasted 60 days and is the second highest penalty in the House, only next to expulsion; it was extended for another 60 days on May 31.

Teves remained abroad. On May 9, Teves had an application to seek political asylum in Timor-Leste which was rejected. The following day, the Department of Justice (DOJ) was informed that a blue notice was issued against Teves by Interpol. On July 26, 2023, the Anti-Terrorism Council designated him, his brother Pryde Henry and 11 others as terrorists due to their links to "alleged killings and harassments," including Degamo's murder, in Negros Oriental. This was the first time the council designated an elected official as a terrorist. In response, Teves criticized President Bongbong Marcos, First Lady Liza Araneta Marcos, several members of his Cabinet, House Speaker Martin Romualdez and others in an online press conference for using his case to distract from other issues in the country, while his lawyer called his terrorist designation an "overreaction".

On August 26, the DOJ announced that murder charges were filed before a regional trial court in Manila against Teves over Degamo's assassination. On September 5, the court released an arrest warrant for Teves over the murder. As of September 13, the DOJ believed that Teves is in hiding somewhere in Southeast Asia under the protection of local warlords. Later that month, Teves was confirmed to be staying in Timor-Leste by former senator Manny Pacquiao, who visited the country for an official visit. His passport was ordered cancelled by such court on February 9, 2024. DOJ Secretary Jesus Crispin Remulla confirmed on February 29 that Interpol issued a red notice for Teves, which officially designated him as a "Fugitive Wanted for Prosecution". On March 21, Teves was arrested by Timorese police at a golf course in Dili.

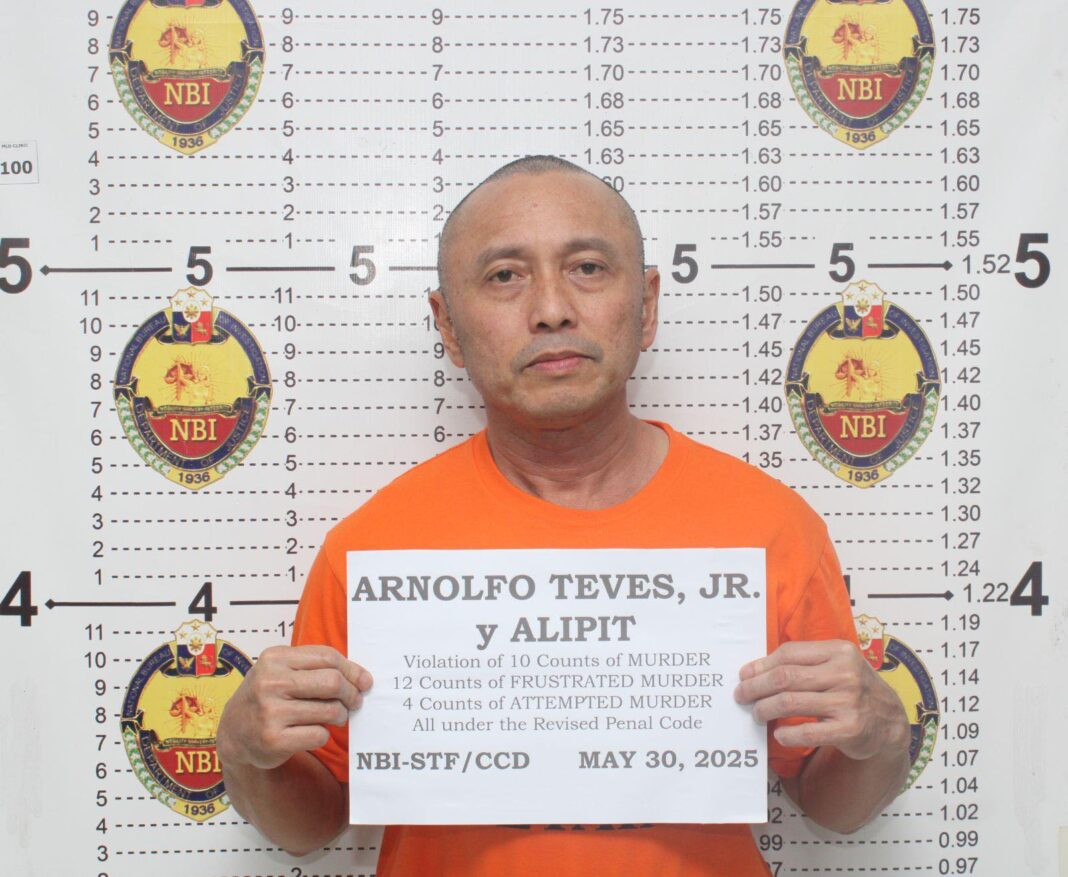
Teves under the custody of the National Bureau of Investigation (Philippines), May 30, 2025

On June 10, 2024, Teves's lawyer, Ferdinand Topacio, said that his client had been freed from detention at Becora Prison, Dili, adding that he will attend further hearings. Former CHR Commissioner Wilhelm "Beebong" D. Soriano will be offered as expert witness. The DOJ however said that his release was procedural and that he was rearrested by East Timorese police, adding that his extradition trial will continue. On June 13, Teves was placed under house arrest by the East Timor Supreme Court of Justice, citing his being a "flight risk". On June 22, it was announced that Teves was ordered released from house arrest. On June 27, the DOJ said that Timor-Leste had approved Teves's extradition to the Philippines. However, the extradition was denied by the Court of Appeal of Timor-Leste on March 20, 2025.

On May 28, 2025, Teves was arrested at his Dili residence, during which he allegedly sustained injuries. Later that night, the Timor-Leste government deported Teves and imposed a 10-year entry ban, declaring him a "threat to national security and interests." The decision was made following assurances by Philippine authorities to the Timor-Leste government that Teves would not be subjected to the death penalty or other inhumane treatment in the Philippines. Teves arrived in the Philippines on May 29 and was detained the next day at the New Bilibid Prison in Muntinlupa. He refused to enter a plea at his arraignment on June 5. On June 11, he was transferred to Camp Bagong Diwa following a court order. On June 17, he underwent an appendectomy at the Philippine General Hospital after suffering severe stomach pains.

On September 12, Teves was allowed to post bail by the court.

== Personal life ==
From a clan of politicians and businessmen, Teves is the brother of politician Pryde Henry Teves. They are nephews of former Finance Secretary Margarito Teves, grandsons of former Negros Oriental governor Herminio "Meniong" Teves, and grandnephews of former governor Lorenzo Teves, who also served as a senator in the 6th and 7th Congress. Their aunt, Virginia "Bebot" Teves-Laurel, is the mother of designer Rajo Laurel. Their grandaunt, Paulita Teves, is the mother of singer Boboy Garrovillo.This Teves family has no relation to the Teveses of Catanduanes.

In early 2023, Teves hosted the radio program Teves Cares Live: Aksyon, Tulong, Solusyon on DZRH and DZRH News Television. Teves owned the restaurant Arnie's Chicken. He also admitted to operating e-sabong (online cockfighting) before it was banned in 2022, claiming "I was one of the first who developed that" but asserted that not all e-sabong are gambling.

In March 2022, Teves' then 24-year-old son and ex officio provincial board member Kurt Matthew Teves was criticized after he was caught on video beating up a village security guard in BF Homes, Parañaque.

== Electoral history ==
Electoral history of Arnie Teves
Year	Office	Party	Votes received				Result
Year	Office	Party	Total	%	P.	Swing	Result
2016	Representative (Negros Oriental–3rd)	NPC	81,449	55.93%	1st	—N/a	Won
2019	Representative (Negros Oriental–3rd)	PDP–Laban	118,970	100.00%	1st	+44.07	Unopposed
2022	Representative (Negros Oriental–3rd)	NPC	91,482	48.99%	1st	-51.01	Won

== See also ==
- List of members of the Philippine House of Representatives expelled, removed, or suspended

Political offices
House of Representatives of the Philippines
Preceded by Pryde Henry Teves	Member of the House of Representatives from Negros Oriental's 3rd district 2016–2023	Vacant Title next held by Janice Degamo
