= Maisa Sagarbarria =

Filipino politician (born 1960)

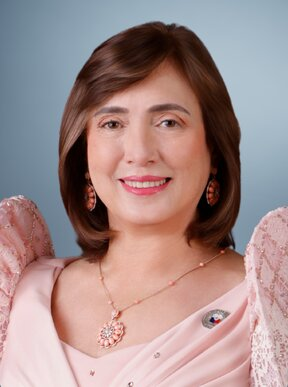
- Official portrait, 2025

Member of Philippine House of Representatives for Negros Oriental's 2nd district
- Incumbent
- Assumed office June 30, 2025
- Preceded by: Manuel Sagarbarria

Vice Mayor of Dumaguete
- In office June 30, 2022 – June 30, 2025
- Mayor: Felipe Antonio Remollo
- Preceded by: Alan Gel Cordova
- Succeeded by: Estanislao Alviola

Personal details
- Born: Ma. Isabel Garcia Longa; March 1, 1960 (age 66) Tanjay, Negros Oriental, Philippines
- Party: Lakas (2025–present)
- Other political affiliations: NPC (2022–2025)
- Spouse: Manuel Sagarbarria
- Children: 4, including Chaco
- Nickname: Maisa

Ma. Isabel "Maisa" Longa Sagarbarria (born March 1, 1960) is a Filipino politician who has served as the representative for Negros Oriental's 2nd congressional district in the Philippine House of Representatives since 2025. Currently a member of Lakas–CMD, she previously served as vice mayor of Dumaguete from 2022 to 2025.

== Early life ==
Ma. Isabel Garcia Longa was born on March 1, 1960, in Tanjay, Negros Oriental, to Antonio Pastrano Longa and Virginia Arnaiz Garcia.

== Political career ==
=== Early political career ===
Sagarbarria was elected barangay captain of Barangay Calindagan, then the second-largest barangay in Dumaguete, in the 2018 barangay and Sangguniang Kabataan elections.

=== Vice mayor of Dumaguete (2022–2025) ===
In 2022, Sagarbarria ran for vice mayor of Dumaguete and won under the Nationalist People's Coalition.

=== 2025 election ===
Sagarbarria's husband, Manuel, the incumbent representative of Negros Oriental's 2nd congressional district, was term-limited. She joined Lakas–CMD ahead of the 2025 House elections, which nominated her as its candidate for the district. She defeated Liberal Party candidate Felipe Remollo, the incumbent mayor of Dumaguete, under whom she had served as vice mayor, by nearly 55,000 votes.

=== Tenure ===
Sagarbarria principally authored several bills, including a concurrent resolution adopting the National Education and Workforce Development Plan of EDCOM II as the government's ten-year policy framework, as well as resolutions seeking to establish a National Cybersecurity Agency, revise the National Cooperative Code, and expand the provisions of the 4Ps Act.

==== Committee membership ====
- Committee on Appropriations (Vice Chair)
- Committee on Civil Service and Professional Regulation (Vice Chair)
- Committee on Agriculture and Food
- Committee on Basic Education and Culture
- Committee on Cooperatives Development
- Committee on Ecology
- Committee on Energy
- Committee on Health
- Committee on Labor and Employment
- Committee on Public Works and Highways
- Committee on Social Services
- Special Committee on Globalization and WTO

== Personal life ==
Sagarbarria is married to former Dumaguete mayor and representative Manuel Sagarbarria. She is the mother of current Negros Oriental Governor Chaco Sagarbarria and Dumaguete councilor Chessa Sagarbarria.

== Electoral history ==
Electoral history of Maisa Sagarbarria
Year	Office	Party	Votes received				Result
Year	Office	Party	Total	%	P.	Swing	Result
2018	Barangay Captain of Calindagan, Dumaguete	Nonpartisan	—N/a	—N/a	1st	—N/a	Won
2022	Vice Mayor of Dumaguete	NPC	43,049	64.22%	1st	—N/a	Won
2025	Representative (Negros Oriental–2nd)	Lakas	159,412	58.87%	1st	—N/a	Won

House of Representatives of the Philippines
Preceded by Manuel Sagarbarria	Member for Negros Oriental's 2nd district June 30, 2025 – present	Incumbent
Political offices
Preceded by Alan Gel Cordova	Vice Mayor of Dumaguete; June 30, 2022 – June 30, 2025	Succeeded by Estanislao Alviola
