= Janice Degamo =

Filipino politician

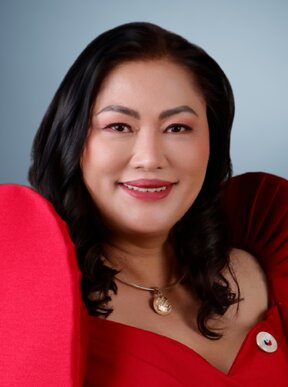
- Official portrait, 2025

Member of the House of Representatives from Negros Oriental's 3rd district
- Incumbent
- Assumed office June 30, 2025
- Preceded by: Arnolfo Teves Jr.

Mayor of Pamplona
- In office June 30, 2016 – June 30, 2025
- Preceded by: Apollo P. Arnaiz
- Succeeded by: Nikko Niño A. Ramirez

Personal details
- Born: Janice Mira Vallega
- Party: Lakas (2024–present)
- Other political affiliations: Nacionalista (2018–2024); NUP (2015–2018)
- Spouse: Roel Degamo (died 2023)
- Children: 2 (adopted)

Janice Mira Vallega-Degamo is a Filipino politician. She was elected in the 2025 Philippine House of Representatives elections for Negros Oriental's 3rd congressional district.

== Political career ==
=== Mayor of Pamplona (2016–2025) ===
Janice Degamo was mayor of Pamplona from 2016 to 2025. The Pamplona massacre of March 2023 occurred during her term when her husband and Negros Oriental governor Roel Degamo was killed. Negros Oriental's 3rd district congressman Arnolfo Teves Jr. was tagged as a "terrorist" for allegedly masterminding the killing and was later removed by the lower house.

=== House of Representatives (2025–present) ===
Janice Degamo took part in the 2025 election and campaigned to be elected as representative of Negros Oriental's 3rd district in the House of Representatives, a position last held by Teves Jr.

A disqualification case was filed against Degamo, allegedly not for fulfilling the one-year residency requirement since Pamplona does not fall under the 3rd district. However Degamo states she transferred her voter registration to Siaton, which is under the 3rd district, on May 6, 2024.

Running under Lakas–CMD, Degamo won the election garnering 108,185 votes. She defeated independent candidate and retired navy colonel Reynaldo Lopez, and Liberal Party candidate Janice Teves, the aunt of Pryde Henry Teves and Teves Jr.

== Personal life ==
She is the widow of Roel Degamo. Her only adopted son with Roel, Carlo Remontal (also known as Carlo Degamo Remontal), and her husband's nephew-turned-adopted son, Nyrth Christian, are members of the Negros Oriental Provincial Board.

== Electoral history ==
Electoral history of Janice Degamo
Year	Office	Party	Votes received				Result
Year	Office	Party	Total	%	P.	Swing	Result
2016	Mayor of Pamplona	NUP	9,651	—N/a	1st	—N/a	Won
2019	Mayor of Pamplona	Nacionalista	16,519	—N/a	1st	—N/a	Won
2022	Mayor of Pamplona	Nacionalista	18,835	—N/a	1st	—N/a	Won
2025	Representative (Negros Oriental–3rd)	Lakas	128,007	58.33%	1st	—N/a	Won

== Notes ==
Political offices
Preceded by Apollo P. Arnaiz	Mayor of Pamplona; 2016–2025	Succeeded by Nikko Ramirez
House of Representatives of the Philippines
Preceded by Arnie Teves	Member of the House of Representatives from Negros Oriental's 3rd district 2025–present	Incumbent
