= Pamplona massacre =

2023 murder of the governor of Negros Oriental, Philippines

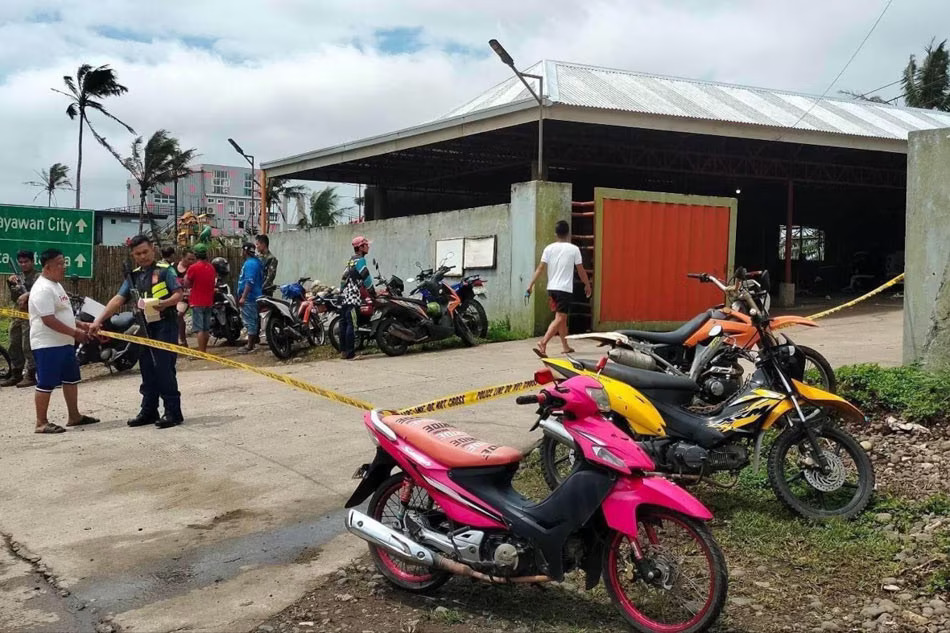
- The residence of Roel Degamo after the attack
- Location: 9°24′16.9″N 123°01′14.8″E; Pamplona, Negros Oriental, Philippines
- Date: March 4, 2023; 3 years ago c. 9:36 am (PhST)
- Target: Roel Degamo
- Attack type: Shooting, assassination
- Deaths: 10 (including the target)
- Injuries: 12
- Motive: Under investigation, possibly politics

The Pamplona massacre was a mass shooting and assassination incident that took place in Pamplona, Negros Oriental, Philippines. On March 4, 2023, at approximately 9:36 a.m. (PhST), a group of armed men stormed the residence of Roel Degamo, the governor of Negros Oriental, killing him as well as nine others. The attack happened during the distribution of aid to the local beneficiaries of the Pantawid Pamilyang Pilipino Program. Degamo was rushed to a nearby provincial hospital, where he was pronounced dead at 11:41 a.m. (PhST).

An investigation was launched by Philippine authorities after the attack. Politics was considered to be the primary motive behind the attack, as Degamo was involved in a contested May 2022 gubernatorial election which saw him assuming the office for a fourth term after winning an electoral protest against Pryde Henry Teves, who was initially proclaimed winner of the elections. Eleven suspects (some of whom were former members of the Armed Forces of the Philippines) were arrested by police in multiple operations across the province. Two of the suspects named a certain "Cong Teves" as the mastermind in an ambush interview with the media. Arnie Teves, the representative of Negros Oriental's 3rd district, who was abroad during the attack, was suspended by the House of Representatives following his failure to return to the country to face investigation. He was later expelled by the House, the first expulsion of a representative in the Fifth Republic. The Senate also launched an inquiry regarding the incident, and invited Arnie Teves via teleconferencing but ultimately withdrew due to legal uncertainties. Justice Secretary Jesus Crispin Remulla considers the representative to be the 'highest mastermind' of the attack.

On February 29, 2024, Interpol issued a red notice against Teves upon the request of the Philippines. Weeks later, on March 21, Teves was arrested in Dili, Timor-Leste by local authorities. He was deported to the Philippines in May 2025.

== Background ==
Roel Degamo was the governor of Negros Oriental at the time of his assassination. He became governor in January 2011, after Governor Agustin Perdices died. Perdices himself assumed the post following the death of Governor Emilio Macias II. Degamo was elected governor in 2013 and was reelected in the 2016 and 2019 elections.

Degamo ran for a fourth term in 2022 election, but lost to Pryde Henry Teves who was proclaimed governor. Degamo filed an electoral protest before the Commission on Elections. A recount was made, with votes for a nuisance candidate named Ruel Degamo considered as a vote for Roel Degamo. The final tally of the recount concluded Degamo as the winner and Teves' proclamation was nullified. Degamo took his oath as governor on October 5, 2022, while his rival Teves voluntarily stepped down from his position on October 11, 2022.

== Shooting ==
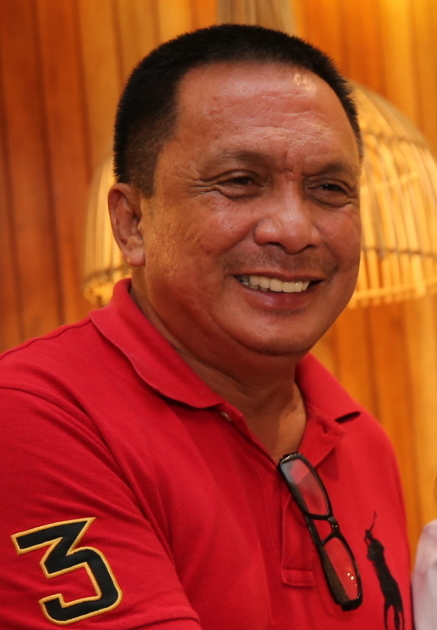
Degamo in 2019

On March 4, 2023, at approximately 9:36 a.m., Degamo was shot several times by unidentified men at his residence in Pamplona, Negros Oriental. He was distributing aid to local beneficiaries of the Pantawid Pamilyang Pilipino Program (4Ps) conditional cash transfer program when the attack happened. He was rushed to Negros Polymedic Hospital in Sibulan, but was pronounced dead at 11:41 a.m.

Eight other people were also killed in the shooting; another died more than two months later. The dead included a barangay kagawad (councilor) and another civilian who were mistaken as Degamo's bodyguards.

On March 16, 2023, Degamo was interred in their family mausoleum at his hometown of Siaton.

Four suspects were arrested in Bayawan while another died in an encounter with state forces.

== Suspects ==
Eleven suspects, all former military men, are under police custody by April 3; nine of them are former personnel while others were a reservist and a trainee. Six of them were arrested while the rest surrendered. One of those arrested was one of the alleged masterminds, former Army reservist Marvin Miranda. Another suspect killed in pursuit operations was later identified as Arnil Labradilla of Bindoy, a former New People's Army rebel.

Murder and frustrated murder charges were filed by Department of Justice prosecutors against four of those arrested (as listed below) as well as twelve John Does before the Tanjay Regional Trial Court (RTC); also, charges of illegal possession of firearms, ammunition, and explosives against three of them before the Bayawan RTC. Those indicted over the assassination include:

- Joven Javier – former Army Light Reaction Regiment (La Castellana, Negros Occidental resident)
- Joric Labrador – former Army Scout Ranger (Cagayan de Oro resident)
- Osmundo Rivero – former Army personnel (Zamboanga City)
- Benjie Rodriguez (Mindanao native)

Upon request by Justice Secretary Jesus Crispin Remulla, these criminal cases were later transferred by the Supreme Court to the Manila RTC wherein the cases against seven more suspects, including Miranda, were later filed. A total of 39 complaints have been filed in relation to the incident: ten for murder, 17 for frustrated murder and nine for attempted murder; in addition to one for illegal possession of firearms and two for illegal possession of explosives.

It was reported that there are "more or less" five other suspects.

DOJ later confirmed that on August 18, charges of frustrated murder, attempted murder and murder were filed against another alleged mastermind, then-expelled Negros Oriental's third district representative Arnie Teves, and four other individuals, before the Manila RTC. Teves and his co-accused Nigel Electona are among the members of the so-called Teves group who were earlier designated by the Anti-Terrorism Council as terrorists.

=== Alleged mastermind ===
The Degamo family speculated that the killing had a political motive pointing out previous killings in the province, some dating prior to the 2022 elections, of supporters of Degamo. Degamo's wife and Pamplona mayor, Janice Degamo, believed that the mastermind was "very known in the country today" but did not specify any name.

Joint Task Force Negros spokesperson Major Cenon Pancito III said that the mastermind could be a former soldier.

==== 'Cong Teves' ====
Suspects Labrador and Rodriguez on March 9, 2023, pinned a certain "Cong Teves" as the mastermind of the shooting. They testified that they were tasked to kill the governor and was told that the provincial executive was a drug lord. They said they had not met this individual personally.

Among the politicians of Negros Oriental who have served as a member of the House of Representatives bearing the Teves family name were Degamo's rival Arnie Teves, and former governor Pryde Henry Teves.

In a privilege speech in Congress, Talino at Galing ng Pinoy (TGP) party-list representative Jose "Bong" Teves Jr. clarified that he was not the "Cong. Teves" referred to by the suspects. He pointed out, that despite sharing his family name with the Teveses of Negros island, that his family hails from Catanduanes in the Bicol Region.

===== Arnie Teves =====
Earlier, to dispel speculations that he was involved in the killing, Arnie Teves said he was undergoing stem cell treatment in the United States at the time of the attack and therefore could not have planned the assassination. He also pointed out that his brother Pryde Henry could not replace Degamo as governor and that the vice governor was his only suitable successor by law.

Following Degamo's killing, Teves Jr. refused to go home to the Philippines, citing concerns over his safety. By April 2023, his whereabouts became unknown, with the Department of Justice saying he was in Cambodia, and Senator Joel Villanueva saying he was sighted in South Korea.

On May 9, Teves had an application to seek political asylum in Timor Leste rejected. The following day the Department of Justice was informed that a blue notice was issued against him by Interpol. On July 26, 2023, the Anti-Terrorism Council designated him, his brother Pryde Henry and 11 others as terrorists due to their links to "alleged killings and harassments," including Degamo's murder, in Negros Oriental. This was the first time the council designated an elected official as a terrorist. In response, Teves criticized President Bongbong Marcos, First Lady Liza Araneta Marcos, several members of his cabinet, House Speaker Martin Romualdez and others in an online press conference for using his case to distract from other issues in the country, while his lawyer called his terrorist designation an "overreaction".

On August 18, charges related to the incident were filed against Teves at Manila RTC. Teves is also facing another, separate murder complaint over the deaths of three individuals in 2019. On 5 September, the court released an arrest warrant for Teves over Degamo's murder. As of 13 September, the Justice Department believes that Teves is in hiding somewhere in Southeast Asia, purportedly under the protection of local warlords. Teves' passport was ordered cancelled by the court on February 9, 2024. A Red Notice was placed on him by Interpol on February 29.

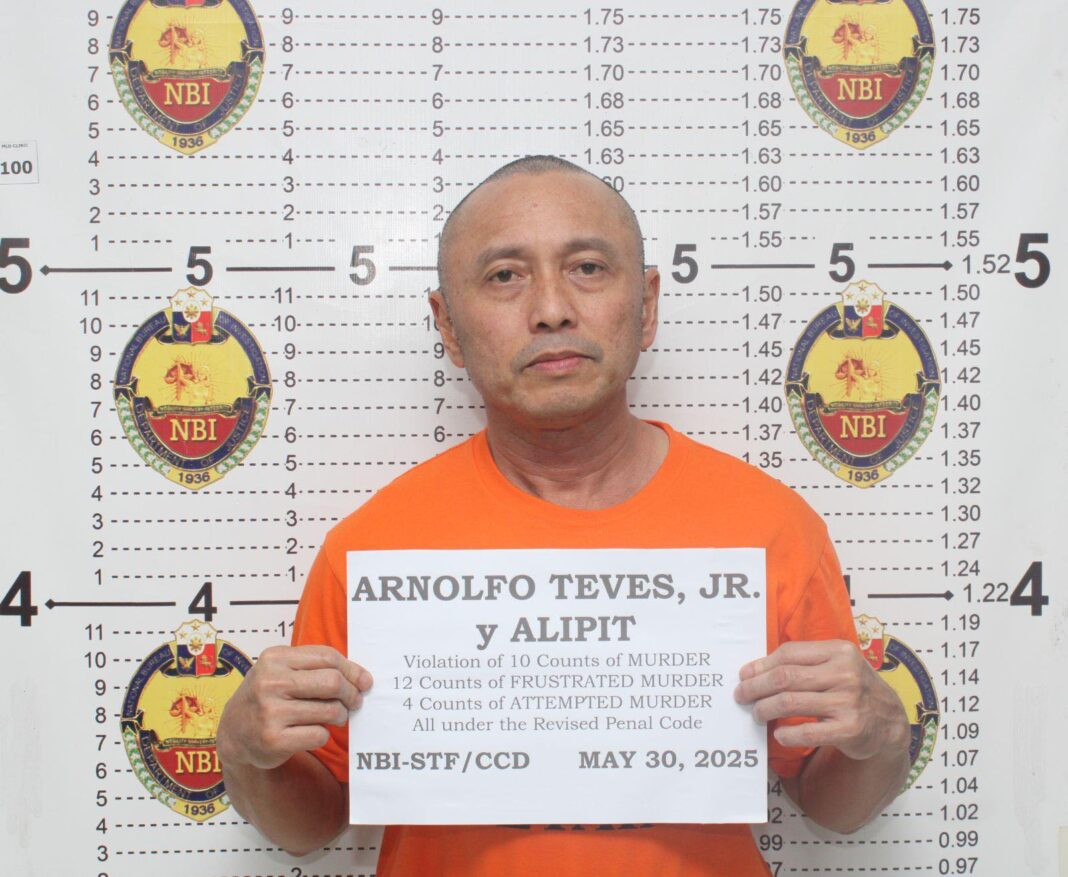
Teves under the custody of the National Bureau of Investigation (Philippines), May 30, 2025

On March 21, 2024, Teves was arrested by the Interpol, National Central Bureau of Dili, and East Timorese Police in Dili. In a conference with the media after the arrest, the Department of Justice acknowledges that the Philippines has no extradition treaty with Timor-Leste, so they are using other channels to bring Teves back to the country as soon as possible.

On April 18, the Department of Justice accused Teves's son of offering a $2,000 (around P114,000) bribe to a member of the Timorese Criminal Investigation Police in exchange for his father's security while in jail, which was denied by Teves' lawyer Ferdinand Topacio. On June 27, the DOJ said that Timor Leste had approved Teves's extradition to the Philippines. However, the extradition was denied by the Court of Appeal of Timor-Leste on March 20, 2025.

On May 28, 2025, Teves was arrested at his Dili residence, during which he allegedly sustained injuries. Later that night, the Timor-Leste government deported Teves and imposed a 10-year entry ban, declaring him a “threat to national security and interests.” The decision was made following assurances by Philippine authorities to the Timor-Leste government that Teves would not be subjected to the death penalty or other inhumane treatment in the Philippines. He arrived in the Philippines on May 29 and was detained the next day at the New Bilibid Prison in Muntinlupa. He refused to enter a plea at his arraignment on June 5, prompting the trial court to enter a not-guilty plea on his behalf. On June 11, he was transferred to Camp Bagong Diwa following a court order.

On September 12, Teves was allowed to post bail by the court.

=== Trial status ===
In September 2026, the Department of Justice confirmed that the Manila Regional Trial Court Branch 40 convicted three suspects in cases involving illegal possession of firearms, ammunition and explosives. Joric Labrador was sentenced to a prison term of 8 years, 8 months and 1 day to 10 years, 8 months and 1 day, for violating a provision of the Comprehensive Firearms and Ammunition Regulation Act. Joven Javier and Benjie Rodriguez were each sentenced to reclusion perpetua for illegal possession of explosives as described by Presidential Decree 1866 as amended by Republic Act 9516.

== Investigation ==
The Degamo family was open to suspects being placed under the government's witness protection program (WPP), to aid the investigation on the case. Two suspects were placed under the WPP.

Justice Secretary Jesus Crispin Remulla also disclosed that they retrieved a video of the suspects discussing the planning of the assassination.

=== Senate hearing ===
The Senate Public Order and Dangerous Drugs Committee launched a probe on Degamo's killing. The first public hearing was held on April 17, 2023.

Arnie Teves was to join via video teleconferencing but senators disproved his participation over uncertainty of whether he would be legally able to testify under oath. Senator Francis Tolentino pointed out that Teves could be able to testify under oath in future hearings by appearing physically in one of the Philippines' diplomatic missions and a military attaché could enforce a contempt order when needed. Senator Ronald dela Rosa initially allowed Teves to participate virtually, which was opposed by Janice Degamo, who believed it would be unfair to those would attend physically to give a 'fugitive' such accommodation.

== Response ==
President Bongbong Marcos attended Degamo's wake and vowed to "bring justice" in Negros Oriental. Marcos and other governors from other provinces condemned the killing. Marcos ordered the formation of a special panel of prosecutors to look into killings in Negros Oriental including Degamo's assassination.

Interior Secretary Benhur Abalos issued a directive calling for the replacement of all police personnel in Negros Oriental following the assassination.

The Commission on Elections vowed faster resolution of election-related protests after Senator Risa Hontiveros said that the Teves–Degamo electoral protest was related to the assassination. Senate President Migz Zubiri described the shooting as an act of political terrorism.

The Region 7 office of the Department of Social Welfare and Development provided ₱513 thousand worth of financial assistance to survivors and relatives of those who died from the attack.

On August 16, 2023, Arnie Teves was unanimously expelled by the House of Representatives due to his abandonment of duty, prolonged absence, and "indecent behavior on social media." With this, he became the first expelled representative since the ratification of the 1987 Constitution that restored the Congress. In response, Teves' lawyer called the body a "kangaroo court".
