= Pamplona, Negros Oriental =

Municipality in Negros Oriental, Philippines

Pamplona
- Municipality
- Municipality of Pamplona
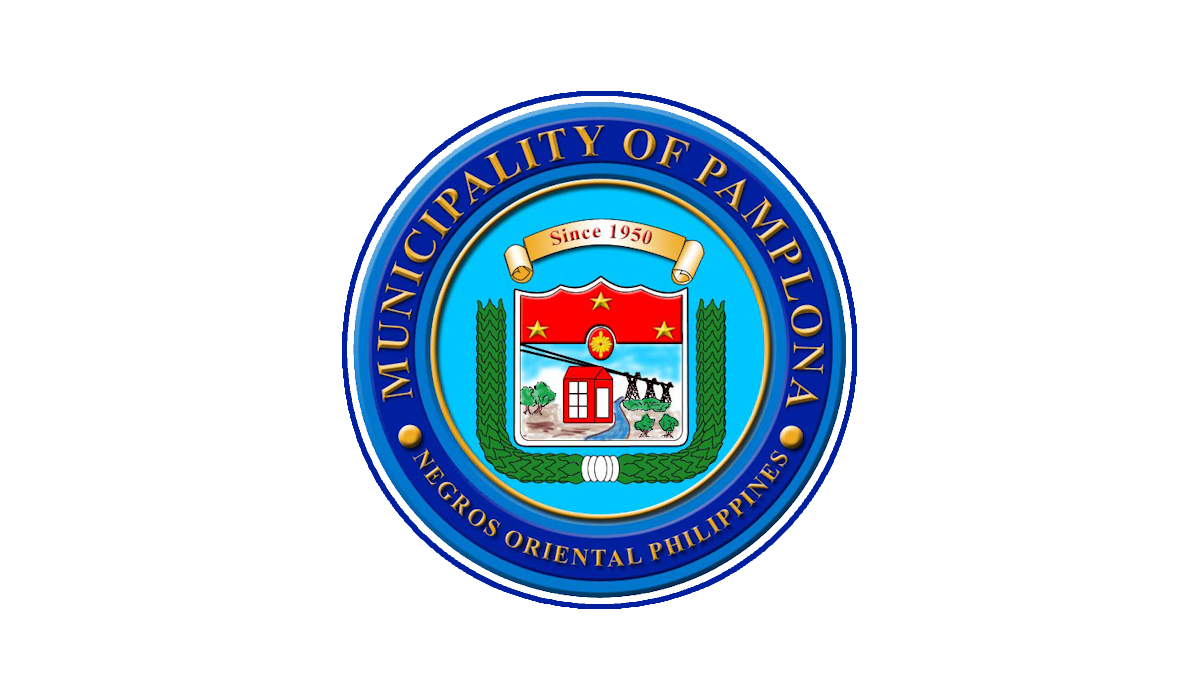
- Flag

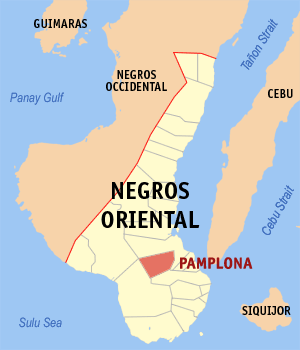
- Map of Negros Oriental with Pamplona highlighted
- Interactive map of Pamplona
- Location within the Philippines
- Coordinates: 9°28′N 123°07′E
- Country: Philippines
- Region: Negros Island Region
- Province: Negros Oriental
- District: 2nd district
- Founded: June 16, 1950
- Barangays: 16 (see Barangays)

Government
  - Type: Sangguniang Bayan
  - Mayor: Nikko Niño A. Ramirez (Lakas)
  - Vice Mayor: Joel G. Remolano (Lakas)
  - Representative: Maisa Sagarbarria (Lakas)
  - Municipal Council: Members: Arnold A. Labe; Lloyd Ian F. Aniñon; Shari T. Vallega; Renante L. Baldado; Edgar Q. Eba; Edgardo R. Retes; Reynaldo D. Tolomia; Ruben A. Labe; Jesamie R. Ha-os ^{◌}; ◌ ex officio SK chairman
  - Electorate: 30,666 voters (2025)

Area
  - Total: 202.20 km^{2} (78.07 sq mi)
- Elevation: 19 m (62 ft)
- Highest elevation: 367 m (1,204 ft)
- Lowest elevation: 0 m (0 ft)

Population (2024 census)
  - Total: 41,209
  - Density: 203.80/km^{2} (527.85/sq mi)
  - Households: 3,057

Economy
  - Income class: 2nd municipal income class
  - Poverty incidence: 30.75% (2023)
  - Revenue: ₱ 203.6 million (2024)
  - Assets: ₱ 640.6 million (2024)
  - Expenditure: ₱ 101.3 million (2024)
  - Liabilities: ₱ 188.4 million (2024)

Service provider
  - Electricity: Negros Oriental 2 Electric Cooperative (NORECO 2)
- Time zone: UTC+8 (PST)
- ZIP code: 6205
- PSGC: 074616000
- IDD : area code: +63 (0)35
- Native languages: Cebuano; Tagalog
- Named after: Pamplona, Spain

Pamplona, officially the Municipality of Pamplona (Filipino: Bayan ng Pamplona), is a municipality in the province of Negros Oriental, Philippines. According to the 2024 census, it has a population of 41,209 people.

== Etymology ==
Originally the place was called “Tampa”, named after a big shady tree located at the heart of the town. The naming of the place into Pamplona has two versions:

- According to professor Timoteo Oracion, a historian of Silliman University, Pamplona was named after the town in Spain called Pamplona. According to his version, the first Spanish priest who was assigned to the place was amazed by the beautiful terrain which resembles to that of Pamplona, Spain. So that Tampa was renamed into Pamplona.
- Other history told by the old people of the place is that the place was called after a certain priest named Fr. Santiago Pamplona, the first Spanish Curate assigned in area.

== History ==
Pamplona, then a barrio of Tanjay, was created into a municipality by virtue of Republic Act No. 535 enacted on June 16, 1950. The law was authored by Pedro Bandoquillio, elected congressman in 1947. Since its creation, it has been administered by six municipal mayors. They were the late Juan Cañaveral, Sergio Aniñon, and late Apolinario P. Arnaiz, Sr., who managed to hold the reign for more than 22 years. After the EDSA Revolution in 1986, Douglas T. Diago was appointed as Officer In Charge, ran and won in the 1987 election and took the reign for twelve years, managing to complete his three term of mayorship from 1986 to 1998.

The late Wenceslao E. Duran, the undefeated politician, took hold of the administration for a brief period, after winning the 1998 election. He died of cardiac arrest while delivering his address during training in the municipality on December 18, 1999. Atty. Ricarte R. Valencia, who was then the vice mayor took office up to June 30, 2001. He ran for the post and lost in the election. Winning in the three elections in 2001. 2004 and 2007, the young, and energetic Apolinario P. Arnaiz, Jr. now reigns in his three terms of office. In the May 2010 election, the brother of Apolinario P. Arnais, Jr., Apollo P. Arnaiz who won the election and reigns in his two terms of office. In the May 2016 election, Janice Vallega Degamo won as the first lady mayor of the municipality.

On March 4, 2023, politician Roel Degamo, who was then serving as Negros Oriental governor, was fatally shot along with eight others by unidentified gunmen at his residence while he was distributing aid to beneficiaries of a conditional cash transfer program.

== Geography ==
Pamplona is located 37 kilometres (23 mi) north-west of the provincial capital of Dumaguete, 6 kilometres (3.7 mi) west from Tanjay, and 44 kilometres (27 mi) from Santa Catalina.

Tanjay bounds it on the north, on the east by Amlan and Tanjay, on the south by Sibulan and on the west by Santa Catalina.

=== Barangays ===
Political map of Pamplona

Pamplona is politically subdivided into 16 barangays. Each barangay consists of puroks and some have sitios.

PSGC	Barangay	Population			±% p.a.	
		2024		2010		
074616001	Abante	2.2%	922	781	▴	1.15%
074616002	Balayong	5.5%	2,260	2,219	▴	0.13%
074616003	Banawe	4.0%	1,656	1,515	▴	0.62%
074616017	Calicanan	6.9%	2,862	2,445	▴	1.09%
074616004	Datagon	7.5%	3,089	2,390	▴	1.79%
074616005	Fatima	4.0%	1,643	1,456	▴	0.84%
074616007	Inawasan	3.3%	1,348	1,320	▴	0.15%
074616008	Magsusunog	4.0%	1,646	1,317	▴	1.55%
074616009	Malalangsi	7.5%	3,110	3,244	▾	−0.29%
074616010	Mamburao	4.9%	2,014	1,929	▴	0.30%
074616011	Mangoto	3.9%	1,608	1,447	▴	0.73%
074616012	Poblacion	17.4%	7,165	5,649	▴	1.66%
074616013	San Isidro	7.8%	3,217	2,997	▴	0.49%
074616014	Santa Agueda	7.8%	3,214	3,041	▴	0.38%
074616015	Simborio	5.3%	2,184	1,541	▴	2.44%
074616016	Yupisan	4.5%	1,867	1,615	▴	1.01%
	Total		41,209	34,906	▴	1.15%

=== Climate ===
Climate data for Pamplona, Negros Oriental
Month	Jan	Feb	Mar	Apr	May	Jun	Jul	Aug	Sep	Oct	Nov	Dec	Year
Mean daily maximum °C (°F)	29 (84)	30 (86)	31 (88)	32 (90)	32 (90)	30 (86)	30 (86)	30 (86)	30 (86)	29 (84)	30 (86)	30 (86)	30 (87)
Mean daily minimum °C (°F)	22 (72)	22 (72)	22 (72)	23 (73)	24 (75)	25 (77)	24 (75)	24 (75)	24 (75)	24 (75)	23 (73)	23 (73)	23 (74)
Average precipitation mm (inches)	26 (1.0)	22 (0.9)	28 (1.1)	41 (1.6)	95 (3.7)	136 (5.4)	147 (5.8)	126 (5.0)	132 (5.2)	150 (5.9)	98 (3.9)	46 (1.8)	1,047 (41.3)
Average rainy days	7.5	6.7	8.9	10.4	21.6	25.6	26.3	25.0	24.1	26.2	19.2	12.1	213.6
Source: Meteoblue

== Demographics ==
Population census of Pamplona
Year	Pop.	±% p.a.
1960	18,383	—
1970	20,541	+1.11%
1975	22,076	+1.46%
1980	23,221	+1.02%
1990	27,971	+1.88%
1995	29,235	+0.83%
2000	32,790	+2.49%
2007	34,557	+0.73%
2010	34,906	+0.37%
2015	37,596	+1.42%
2020	39,805	+1.21%
2024	41,209	+0.84%
Source: Philippine Statistics Authority

== Economy ==
Poverty incidence of Pamplona (%)

Source: Philippine Statistics Authority

=== Agriculture ===
Agriculture continues to be the main economic activity in Pamplona as it played an important role in the development of the town. The main crops raised in the place are sugar, coconuts and bananas. Other crops such as corn, rice and other root crops grows in areas where accessibility to farm to market roads is rare. Coconut is the largest crops raised accumulating 3,676 hectares, followed by sugar 3,432 hectares and corn, 1,022 hectares. Only 107 hectares are irrigated rice land while 643 hectares are upland rice. Of the total agriculture areas of the municipality, 11,395 is strategic areas for development of Agro-industrial crops, 1,925 hectares for food crops while 925 for High Value Crops. Other agri-related economic activities which greatly helped in the increase of farmer's income is livestock raising. Record shows that livestock raised includes large cattle, swine, chicken, goats and many others. Other information on agricultural support facilities are shown in the following presentation.

=== Industrial sector ===
There are 243 food establishments operating in the municipality, 218 or 90% which have sanitary permits. There are 10 sand and gravel companies operating in the municipality, six copra buyers and five hog buyers.

== Tourism ==
Another potential area which attracts visitors, is the sulfuric waterfalls known as The Palaypay Falls. Its water source is nestled by the mountains of Sibulan. The place is accessible by four-wheel drive vehicles and motorcycles, being connected by rough roads. It is located 12 kilometers from the Poblacion and can be reached within 30-min drive or 2-hour walk from the Poblacion.

Mountain ridges overlooking the plains of Pamplona, can be an object for viewers of scenic beauties. Nabalabag ridge, located at an elevation of 800 m above sea level at barangay San Isidro, overlooks on the west at municipalities of Bayawan and Santa Catalina and in the east, with the town of Pamplona, Tanjay and Manjuyod and the city of Bais.

Pasalubong delicacies processed in the municipality include Glazed Banana and Carmelitos. The famous Bodbod is also processed in the area.

== Culture ==
The municipality launched the Kasulad Festival on October 1–12, 2005. This is a yearly festival which will include street dancing and agricultural and industrial fair.

Every October 12 of the year, the town marks the celebration of Yamog Festival. Through Presidential Proclamation 690, October 12, 2024 was declared a special non-working day for the celebration of the Yamog Festival.

== Education ==
=== Elementary and high schools ===
The municipality has a total of 23 established primary and elementary schools. Each of the sixteen barangays composing the municipality has at least one primary school.

Performance indicator for the School year 2004-2005 revealed that the literacy rate is 80%, Cohort Survival rate is 40.89%, drop out rate is 2.32%, and participation rate is 85.97. This mean that out of the total children enrolled in schools 2.32% drop out or stop during the school year and of the total school age population, 85.97% are in schools.

DepEd is undertaking various educational programs. Among which is the Third Elementary Education Program (TEEP) for School buildings, improvement and Innovation facilities. To the moment five buildings were improved and repaired.

The Fifth Country Program for Children (CPC V) has identified another two pilot barangays for its child program. Day care Children, Grades I and II of barangays Magsusunog and Inawasan had availed the program. They were provided with vitamin supplements, plastic chairs and other materials to meet the child-friendly-school standards. Barangay Health Centres on the other hand had received equipment and facilities in the delivery of health services.

- Abante Elementary School — Abante
- Balayong Elementary School — Balayong
- Banawe Elementary School — Banawe
- Calicanan Elementary School — Calicanan
- Caningay Elementary School — Sitio Caningay, San Isidro
- Cantilo Elementary School — Sitio Cantilo, Mangoto
- Datagon Elementary School — Datagon
- Fatima Elementary School — Fatima
- Hunop Elementary School — Sitio Hunop, San Isidro
- Ilalan Elementary School — Sitio Ilalan, Yupisan
- Inawasan Elementary School — Inawasan
- Magsusunog Elementary School — Magsusunog
- Malalangsi Elementary School — Malalangsi
- Mamburao Elementary School — Mamburao
- Nabalabag Elementary School — Sitio Nabalabag, San Isidro
- Pamplona Central Elementary School — Poblacion
- Samoyao Elementary School — Sitio Samoyao, Yupisan
- San Isidro Elementary School — San Isidro
- Simborio Elementary School — Simborio
- Sta. Agueda Elementary School — Sta. Agueda
- Tigbao Elementary School — Sitio Tigbao, Banawe
- Yupisan Elementary School — Yupisan

The public schools in the town of Pamplona are administered by two school districts under the Schools Division of Tanjay City.

- Adela Pera Memorial High School — Fatima
- Apolinario Gerarda Arnaiz High School — Magsusunog
- Exequil P. Toroy High School — Banawe
- Hunop Community High School — Sitio Hunop, San Isidro
- Inawasan Provincial Community High School — Inawasan
- Isidoro Salma Memorial High School — Balayong
- Pamplona National High School — Poblacion
- Samoyao High School — Samoyao
- San Isidro High School — San Isidro
- Sta. Agueda National High School — Sta. Agueda
- Sta. Agueda NHS - Calicanan Extension — Calicanan

=== Higher educational institutions ===
The Negros Oriental State University Main Campus College of Agriculture, Forestry and Fisheries has an extension campus in Pamplona. In 2008, Paidos Learning Center (now Paidos Learning And Nurturing Academe+, Incorporated) was established for early childhood ages. As a private institution, PLAN A+ has been an active partner in community development for Education and Care (EDUCARE). Paidos complements the EDUCARE services of children in DSWD Daycare centers and the Kindergartners in DepEd schools.

== Healthcare ==
The record of live birth indicates that 20 children are born for every 1,000 population, while death records showed that 4 died for every 1,000. The data shows, that with the total population of 32,000 the municipality's population will increase to 37,120 by the year 2012. This indicates the need to strengthen the campaign for birth control or family planning. According to the report of the MHO with the total death, 99% or 156 had medical attendance. These proves that medical services is efficient and effective. Of the seven infant deaths three died of Pneumonia, two died of unknown cause and two on stillbirths. Cause of one maternal death was due to Postpartum hemorrhage. The decrease of infant and maternal death rate for the year signified the efficient and effective delivery of health services in the barangays. Despite the insufficient facilities in the barangays, midwives and health workers efficiently did their jobs. The top three leading causes of mortality showed that 60 died of Pneumonia, 18 died of Cerebrovascular Accident while 17 died of Congestive Hearth Failure, while the top three leading causes of morbidity showed Influenza, Pneumonia and Diarrhea. Basing on the report, Pneumonia is the top leading cause of mortality among infants and adults. The top three leading causes of morbidity are environmentally borne. All three can be accounted to poor environmental sanitation. This situation will guide both health workers and stakeholders where to direct its programs. Malnutrition is still prevalent in the municipality, although incidence of severe malnutrition is 0.7% which is very low, incidence of mild malnutrition is 44% which is still high. The incidence of severe has to be eradicated and the incidence of mild has to be reduced. Improving health condition of the people and total eradication of both infant and maternal death incidence are the endeavors of heath workers. With this, there is a need for substantial support of both the barangay and municipal government units in the form of facilities, supplies and medicines.
