= Roel Degamo =

Filipino politician (1966–2023)

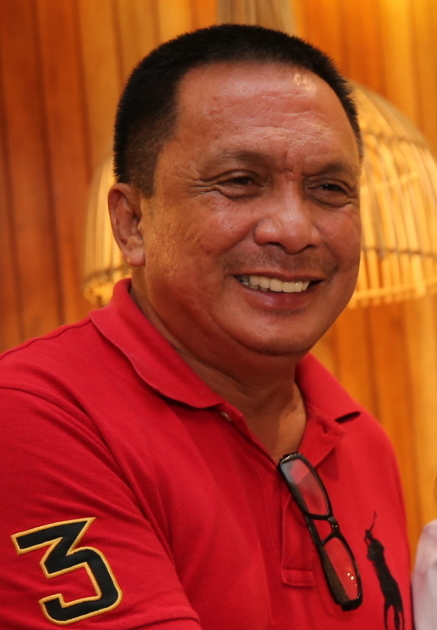
- Degamo in 2019

20th Governor of Negros Oriental
- In office October 5, 2022 (Note: Degamo took his oath as governor on October 5, 2022, and held a temporary office at the Sidlakang Negros Village in Dumaguete since then. Meanwhile, Pryde Henry Teves voluntarily relinquished the governorship on October 11. Degamo eventually assumed the position at the provincial capitol on October 17.) – March 4, 2023
- Vice Governor: Carlo Jorge Joan Reyes
- Preceded by: Pryde Henry Teves
- Succeeded by: Carlo Jorge Joan Reyes
- In office January 5, 2011 – June 30, 2022; Suspended: October 18, 2017 – January 17, 2018
- Vice Governor: Apolinario Arnaiz Jr. (2011–2013); Edward Mark Macias (2013–2022)
- Preceded by: Agustin Perdices
- Succeeded by: Pryde Henry Teves

Vice Governor of Negros Oriental
- In office June 30, 2010 – January 5, 2011
- Governor: Agustin Perdices
- Preceded by: Jose Baldado
- Succeeded by: Apolinario Arnaiz Jr.

Member of the Negros Oriental Provincial Board
- Ex officio
- In office 2004 – June 30, 2007
- Sector: Philippine Councilors League

Member of the Siaton Municipal Council
- In office June 30, 1998 – June 30, 2007

Personal details
- Born: Roel Ragay Degamo; April 29, 1966 Siaton, Negros Oriental, Philippines
- Died: March 4, 2023 (aged 56) Pamplona, Negros Oriental, Philippines
- Cause of death: Assassination (gunshot wounds)
- Resting place: Siaton, Negros Oriental, Philippines
- Party: Nacionalista (2018–2023)
- Other political affiliations: NUP (2015–2018); PDP–Laban (until 2015)
- Spouse: Janice Vallega
- Children: 2 (adopted)
- Education: Silliman University (BS)
- Occupation: Mechanical engineer; politician

Roel Ragay Degamo (April 29, 1966 – March 4, 2023) was a Filipino politician who served as governor of Negros Oriental from 2011 to June 2022, and again from October 2022 until his assassination on March 4, 2023. He previously served as the province's vice governor from 2010 to 2011, and was a municipal councilor of Siaton from 1998 to 2007.

In the 2010 elections, he garnered the most votes for the Negros Oriental Provincial Board. With the successive deaths of the elected governor and vice governor, Degamo ascended to the governorship in January 2011. He was suspended from office in October 2017 until January 2018 due to three dismissal orders from the Office of the Ombudsman stemming from allegations of misappropriating public funds. He successfully appealed his suspension and dismissal.

Degamo lost the gubernatorial race to Pryde Henry Teves in the May 2022 elections. However, back in October 2021, during the run-up to the elections, Degamo filed an electoral complaint to have another gubernatorial candidate—an almost namesake known as "Ruel Degamo"—be declared a nuisance candidate meant to "confuse and deceive" the electorate. The Commission on Elections (COMELEC) ruled in the governor's favor, however, the latter candidate filed an appeal. The election pushed through before COMELEC made a final ruling on the case. In June 2022, a defeated Degamo filed a petition for mandamus at the Supreme Court, which compelled COMELEC to resolve the case. On October 3, 2022, COMELEC upheld their earlier decision and transferred votes obtained by Ruel to Roel, proclaiming him the election's true winner.

On March 4, 2023, he was assassinated by a group of armed men at his home in Pamplona, Negros Oriental.

== Personal life ==
Roel Ragay Degamo was born in Bonawon in the municipality of Siaton, Negros Oriental on April 29, 1966. He finished his primary and secondary education in his hometown and in Dumaguete, respectively; then earned his bachelor's degree in mechanical engineering from Silliman University in 1989. He passed the licensure examinations that same year.

Prior to entering politics, Degamo worked as a mechanic and driver. He worked at the National Power Corporation since 1991; was promoted in 1992 as senior plant mechanic, and in 1995 as electrical control operator of the Integrated Barge Management Department, both positions co-terminus with the project. His dismissal in 1997 was later reversed by the Court of Appeals (CA).

Degamo's widow is incumbent Pamplona, Negros Oriental mayor Janice Vallega-Degamo. His only, adopted son, Carlo Remontal (also known as Carlo Degamo Remontal), and his nephew-turned-adopted son, Nyrth Christian, are members of the Negros Oriental Provincial Board.

== Political career ==
=== Siaton Municipal Council (1998–2007) ===
Degamo started his political career in his hometown of Siaton, serving three consecutive terms in the Sangguniang Bayan (municipal council) from 1998 to 2007. He concurrently served as president of the Provincial Councilors League (PCL) of Negros Oriental from 2004 to 2007, making him an ex officio member of the Negros Oriental Provincial Board. He was also elected as Region VII chairperson, which entitled him to a seat in the National Board of the Philippine Councilor's League.

=== Vice Governor of Negros Oriental (2010–2011) ===
In the 2010 elections he ran for a regular seat in the Negros Oriental Provincial Board, and won with the highest number of votes, representing the 3rd legislative district of the province. Degamo assumed the position of vice-governor when vice governor-elect Agustin Perdices assumed the gubernatorial position vacated by the elected governor Emilio Macias II, who died before taking his oath of office for another term. However, Governor Perdices died in January 2011 and in accordance with the Local Government Code, Degamo became the governor.

=== Governor of Negros Oriental (2011–2023) ===
==== First four terms (2011–2022) ====
After serving the remainder of Perdices' term, Degamo was elected governor on his own right for three consecutive terms: in 2013 (under PDP–Laban), in 2016 (under National Unity Party), and in 2019 (under Nacionalista Party).

===== Controversies =====
Degamo had received three dismissal orders from the Office of the Ombudsman during his tenure from 2011 to 2022:

- In 2016, the Office of the Ombudsman ordered Degamo's dismissal for alleged calamity fund misuse from Typhoon Sendong in 2011 worth P480 million, but he was able to secure a 60-day Temporary Restraining Order (TRO) from the CA blocking the suspension.
- In 2017, Degamo was suspended for three months for alleged usurpation of calamity funds from the 6.9 magnitude earthquake in 2012. Then vice governor Mark Macias took over the governorship in an acting capacity for 90 days.
- Also in late 2017, while Degamo was serving his suspension, the Office of the Ombudsman issued another dismissal order against Degamo after he was found guilty of grave misconduct over alleged misuse of ₱10 million worth of intelligence funds in 2013. While on suspension, Degamo was able to secure another TRO from the CA on January 11, 2018, to block the dismissal order but the Supreme Court dissolved the TRO on November 13, 2019. However, it was later revealed that the CA already resolved the case and cleared Degamo as early as September 2019, hindering once again his dismissal.

===== Accomplishments =====
Degamo, as provincial governor, continued programs of his predecessors, along with other projects in his first days in office. His administration had a banner program, HELP (Health, Education and Environment, Livelihood Programs, Projects for Peace and Development). Among his projects were the construction of additional classrooms, upgrading of community primary hospitals, and construction of support infrastructures for local tourist spots, as well as sports development in the province.

Among his accomplishments at the hospitals were additional facilities at the Negros Oriental Provincial Hospital including an oxygen generating plant, a Malasakit Center and an Eye Center, as well as an Emergency Maternal Neonatal Care facility, one of a total of 34 such facilities established by the provincial government. A program initiated in 2019 successfully increased the rate of access to sanitary toilet by 9%. In the same year, the Department of Health (DOH) declared Negros Oriental as one of the 10 malaria-free provinces in the country based on standards of the World Health Organization. In 2022, the province received recognitions from the DOH for its projects on medical services.

Adhering to the Paris Agreement, in 2018, Degamo issued an executive order mandating the use of renewable energy in the province and imposed a moratorium on coal, which he strongly opposed. As a result, the province became the first country's sub-national government member of the Powering Past Coal Alliance.

Fifty-one local Marine Protected Areas were established in the province.

With Negros Oriental still the only province in Central Visayas to face the problem of communist insurgency, his administration started development projects. The province was the first in the country to establish its Task Force to End Local Communist Armed Conflict, in 2019, with Degamo as chairperson. More than a month prior to his death, Degamo said that they were 80% "towards gearing a zero insurgency." The task force reportedly proposed the construction of a primary hospital in Tamlang Valley for the residents of Santa Catalina, Pamplona, and Valencia, as well as a social housing project for former communist insurgents, to address insurgency problems.

In 2019, the province ranked as one of the country's top destinations, while Dumaguete was recognized as one of the world's best places to retire.

==== 2022 elections and fifth term ====
Degamo, running under Nacionalista Party, sought re-election in 2022 for a fourth consecutive term after the Commission on Elections (COMELEC) controversially allowed him to run despite completing three straight terms claiming that his three terms in office were interrupted a number of times following suspension and dismissal orders by the Office of the Ombudsman, but lost to Bayawan City mayor Pryde Henry Teves. Teves took his oath of office on June 30, 2022, however, Teves and Degamo had a brief standoff for hours as Degamo refused to vacate the office, but eventually conceded and exited after negotiations.

Earlier, on December 16, 2021, a COMELEC division granted the petition filed by Degamo declaring another gubernatorial candidate, a certain Ruel Degamo, whose real name is Grego Gaudia, as a nuisance. However, the almost-imitated name (Ruel Degamo) remained on the official ballot pending a final COMELEC en banc ruling by election day. On September 1, 2022, the commission denied the motion for reconsideration filed by Gaudia, upholding its earlier ruling.

Later that month, the COMELEC, deciding with finality on the declaration about Gaudia, moved to nullify the victory of Teves. The votes garnered by Gaudia would be credited to Degamo, surpassing those by Teves; therefore enough to win. Degamo was proclaimed on October 3, and yet to report to the provincial capitol to assume the governorship once again.

Degamo took his oath before President Bongbong Marcos at the Malacañang Palace on October 5. Meanwhile, Teves, refusing to step down, had filed an appeal before the Supreme Court (SC) to contest the latest COMELEC ruling, which was expected to be decided by October 11.

However, on that date, the SC had not acted yet on the appeal; Teves later voluntarily relinquished the governorship.

Negros Oriental gubernatorial election, 2022
Candidates	Party	Votes	
Candidates	Party	Final and official result (Note: Representing 100% Certificates of Canvass received from Boards of Canvassers, as per COMELEC.)	Updated canvass, Oct. 2022 (Note: As per COMELEC special provincial board of canvassers, applying the commission's en banc resolution, Sept. 2022.)
Pryde Henry Teves	NPC	301,319	301,319
Roel Degamo (Incumbent)	Nacionalista	281,773	331,726 (Note: Ruel Degamo, Grego Gaudia in real life, was declared nuisance candidate; votes obtained by him were later credited to Roel Degamo.)
Ruel Degamo	Independent	49,953	0
Edward Mark Macias	Liberal	45,454	45,454
Notes:

On February 14, 2023, the SC en banc dismissed the petitions separately filed by Teves, as well as by Gaudia; thus, the COMELEC's declaration of Degamo's victory was affirmed.

== Death ==
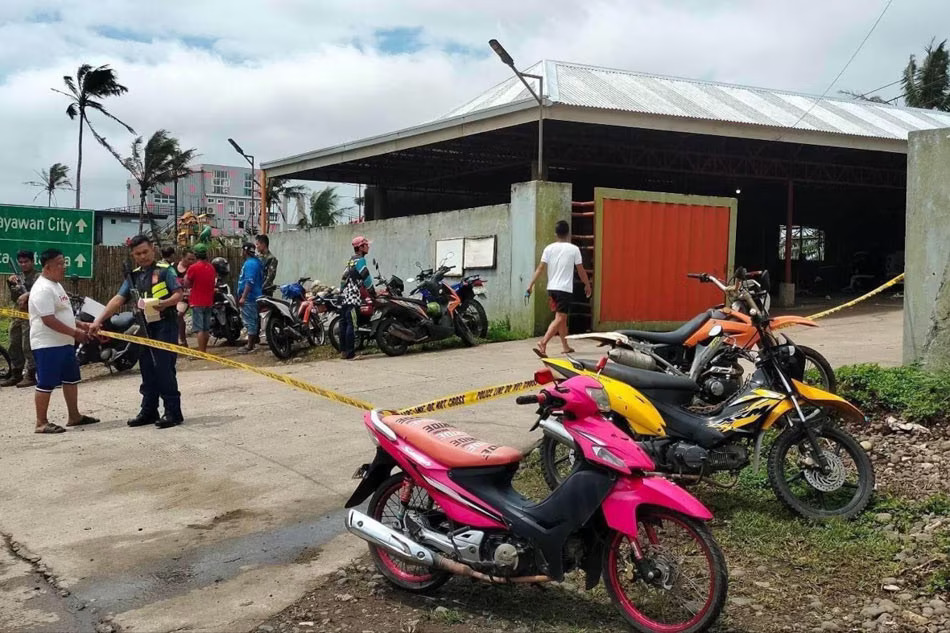
Police cordoned off the site Degamo was killed.

On March 4, 2023, at approximately 9:36 a.m., Degamo was shot several times by unidentified men at his residence in Pamplona, Negros Oriental. He was distributing aid to local beneficiaries of the Pantawid Pamilyang Pilipino Program (4Ps) program when the attack happened. He was rushed to Negros Polymedic Hospital in Sibulan, but was pronounced dead at 11:41 a.m. Nine other people were also killed in the shooting, along with 17 injured.

He was later interred at his family mausoleum in Siaton, alongside his parents and sister.

=== Perpetrator ===
Until mid-March 2024, eight suspects, including two alleged masterminds—one of them Arnolfo Teves Jr.—were later arrested, one of them in a separate raid; five others surrendered. Criminal charges were separately filed against four of them before the Regional Trial Courts (RTCs) in two cities in the province. These were later transferred by the Supreme Court to the Manila RTC; the rest of the suspects, as well as three others, were later indicted. Almost forty cases have been filed.

Another suspect died in an encounter with state forces in Bindoy.

The arrest warrants against the three have been issued.

Before being charged in August 2023, Teves was among the 13 designated by the Anti-Terrorism Council as terrorists; and being the province's 3rd district representative, was later expelled by the House of Representatives. In 2024, Teves was arrested by authorities in Dili, Timor-Leste about a month after a red notice was issued for him by the International Criminal Police Organization (Interpol). His extradition to the Philippines is being arranged.

== Notes ==
Political offices
Preceded by Agustin Perdices	Governor of Negros Oriental; 2011–2022	Succeeded by Pryde Henry Teves
Preceded by Pryde Henry Teves	Governor of Negros Oriental; 2022–2023	Succeeded by Carlo Jorge Joan Reyes
