= Negros Oriental's 3rd congressional district =

Legislative district of the Philippines

- Constituency for the House of Representatives of the Philippines
- Map
- Location of Negros Oriental within the Philippines
- Province: Negros Oriental
- Region: Negros Island Region
- Population: 451,388 (2020)
- Electorate: 291,224 (2022)
- Major settlements: 9 LGUs: Cities; Bayawan; Municipalities; Bacong; Basay; Dauin; Santa Catalina; Siaton; Valencia; Zamboanguita
- Area: 2,107.83 km^{2} (813.84 sq mi)

Current constituency
- Created: 1987
- Representative: Janice Degamo
- Political party: Lakas

Negros Oriental's 3rd congressional district is one of the three congressional districts of the Philippines in the province of Negros Oriental. It has been represented in the House of Representatives since 1987. The district consists of the southernmost parts of the province that were previously included in Negros Oriental's 2nd district. It contains the city of Bayawan and the municipalities immediately to the south and west of the provincial capital city, Dumaguete, namely Bacong, Basay, Dauin, Santa Catalina, Siaton, Valencia and Zamboanguita.

It is currently held by Janice Degamo who was elected in 2025.

== Representation history ==
#	Image	Member	Term of office		Congress	Party	Electoral history	Constituent LGUs
#	Image	Member	Start	End	Congress	Party	Electoral history	Constituent LGUs
=== Negros Oriental's 3rd district for the House of Representatives of the Philippines ===
District created February 2, 1987 from Negros Oriental's at-large district.
1		Margarito Teves	June 30, 1987	June 30, 1998	8th	Lakas ng Bansa	Elected in 1987.	1987–present Bacong, Basay, Bayawan, Dauin, Santa Catalina, Siaton, Valencia, Zamboanguita
1		Margarito Teves	June 30, 1987	June 30, 1998	9th	LDP	Re-elected in 1992.	1987–present Bacong, Basay, Bayawan, Dauin, Santa Catalina, Siaton, Valencia, Zamboanguita
1		Margarito Teves	June 30, 1987	June 30, 1998	10th	Lakas	Re-elected in 1995.	1987–present Bacong, Basay, Bayawan, Dauin, Santa Catalina, Siaton, Valencia, Zamboanguita
2		Herminio Teves	June 30, 1998	June 30, 2007	11th	Lakas	Elected in 1998.	1987–present Bacong, Basay, Bayawan, Dauin, Santa Catalina, Siaton, Valencia, Zamboanguita
2		Herminio Teves	June 30, 1998	June 30, 2007	12th	Lakas	Re-elected in 2001.	1987–present Bacong, Basay, Bayawan, Dauin, Santa Catalina, Siaton, Valencia, Zamboanguita
2		Herminio Teves	June 30, 1998	June 30, 2007	13th	Lakas	Re-elected in 2004.	1987–present Bacong, Basay, Bayawan, Dauin, Santa Catalina, Siaton, Valencia, Zamboanguita
3		Pryde Henry Teves	June 30, 2007	June 30, 2016	14th	Lakas	Elected in 2007.	1987–present Bacong, Basay, Bayawan, Dauin, Santa Catalina, Siaton, Valencia, Zamboanguita
3		Pryde Henry Teves	June 30, 2007	June 30, 2016	15th	NPC	Re-elected in 2010.	1987–present Bacong, Basay, Bayawan, Dauin, Santa Catalina, Siaton, Valencia, Zamboanguita
3		Pryde Henry Teves	June 30, 2007	June 30, 2016	16th	NPC	Re-elected in 2013.	1987–present Bacong, Basay, Bayawan, Dauin, Santa Catalina, Siaton, Valencia, Zamboanguita
4		Arnie Teves	June 30, 2016	March 17, 2023	17th	PDP–Laban	Elected in 2016.	1987–present Bacong, Basay, Bayawan, Dauin, Santa Catalina, Siaton, Valencia, Zamboanguita
4		Arnie Teves	June 30, 2016	March 17, 2023	18th	PDP–Laban	Re-elected in 2019.	1987–present Bacong, Basay, Bayawan, Dauin, Santa Catalina, Siaton, Valencia, Zamboanguita
4		Arnie Teves	June 30, 2016	March 17, 2023	19th	NPC	Re-elected in 2022. Expelled.	1987–present Bacong, Basay, Bayawan, Dauin, Santa Catalina, Siaton, Valencia, Zamboanguita
—		Vacant (Note: House Speaker Martin Romualdez serves as legislative caretaker from August 2023.)			19th	—	Special election canceled	1987–present Bacong, Basay, Bayawan, Dauin, Santa Catalina, Siaton, Valencia, Zamboanguita
5		Janice Degamo	June 30, 2025	Incumbent	20th	Lakas	Elected in 2025.	1987–present Bacong, Basay, Bayawan, Dauin, Santa Catalina, Siaton, Valencia, Zamboanguita

== Election results ==
=== 2025 ===
Candidate	Party	Votes	%
Janice Degamo	Lakas–CMD	128,007	58.33
Janice Teves	Liberal Party	65,574	29.88
Reynaldo Lopez	Independent	25,867	11.79
Total		219,448	100.00
Valid votes		219,448	85.59
Invalid/blank votes		36,942	14.41
Total votes		256,390	100.00
Registered voters/turnout		308,907	83.00
Lakas–CMD gain from Nationalist People's Coalition			
Source: Commission on Elections

=== 2022 ===
2022 Philippine House of Representatives elections
Party	Candidate	Votes	%
NPC	Arnolfo Teves Jr.	91,482	48.99
Nacionalista	Reynaldo Lopez	87,684	46.96
PROMDI	Joan Estrella	4,779	2.56
Independent	Jocelyn Estrella	2,779	1.49
Total votes		186,724	100.00
NPC hold			

=== 2019 ===
2019 Philippine House of Representatives elections
Party	Candidate	Votes	%
PDP–Laban	Arnolfo Teves Jr.	118,970	100.00%
Total votes		118,970	100.00%
PDP–Laban hold			

=== 2016 ===
2016 Philippine House of Representatives elections
Party	Candidate	Votes	%
NPC	Arnolfo Teves Jr.	81,449	55.93
UNA	Henry Sojor	61,174	42.00
Independent	Ivy Marie Pergamino	3,011	2.07
Total votes		145,634	100.00
NPC hold			

=== 2013 ===
2013 Philippine House of Representatives elections
Party	Candidate	Votes	%
NPC	Pryde Henry Teves	40,187	49.00
Liberal	Marcelo Andaza	19,074	23.26
Margin of victory		21,113	25.74
Invalid or blank votes		22,751	27.74
Total votes		82,012	100.00
NPC hold			

=== 2010 ===
2010 Philippine House of Representatives elections
Party	Candidate	Votes	%
Lakas–Kampi	Pryde Henry Teves	92,911	66.12
NPC	Marcelo Adanza	43,905	31.24
Liberal	Telesforo Diao Jr.	3,709	2.64
Valid ballots		140,525	85.91
Invalid or blank votes		23,051	14.09
Total votes		163,576	100.00
Lakas–Kampi hold			

== See also ==
- Legislative districts of Negros Oriental
