= Elections in the Philippines =

Elections in the Philippines are of several types. The president, vice-president, and the senators are elected for a six-year term, while the members of the House of Representatives, governors, vice-governors, members of the Sangguniang Panlalawigan (provincial board members), mayors, vice-mayors, members of the Sangguniang Panlungsod/members of the Sangguniang Bayan (city/municipal councilors), barangay officials, and the members of the Sangguniang Kabataan (youth councilors) are elected to serve for a three-year term.

Congress has two chambers. The House of Representatives has 316 seats since 2022, of which 80% are contested in single seat electoral districts and 20% are allotted to party-lists according to a modified Hare quota with remainders disregarded and a three-seat cap. These party list seats are only accessible to marginalized and under-represented groups and parties, local parties, and sectoral wings of major parties that represent the marginalized. The Constitution of the Philippines allows the House of Representatives to have more than 250 members by statute without a need for a constitutional amendment. The Senate has 24 members who are elected on a nationwide at-large basis; they do not represent any geographical district. Half of the Senate is renewed every three years.

The Philippines has a multi-party system, with numerous parties in which no one party normally has a chance of gaining power alone, and parties must work with each other to form a coalition government. The Commission on Elections (COMELEC) is responsible for running the elections.

Under the Constitution, elections for the members of Congress and local positions (except barangay officials) occur every second Monday of every third year after May 1992, and presidential and vice presidential elections occur every second Monday of May every sixth year after May 1992. All elected officials, except those at the barangay level, start (and end) their terms of office on June 30 of the election year.

== History ==
Memorials to Francisco Guerrero, Presidente Municipal of Baliwag

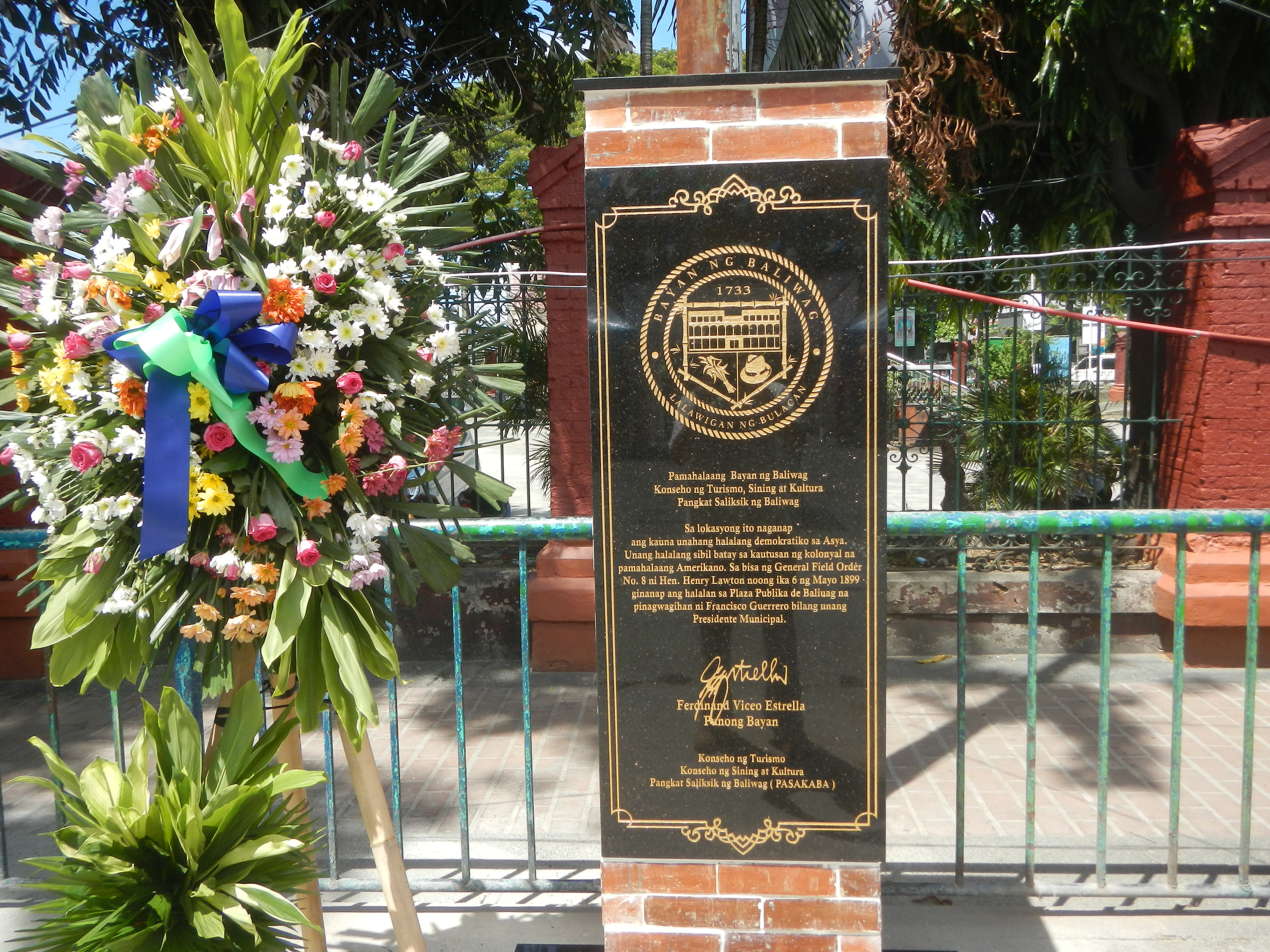
Plaza Baliwag historical marker

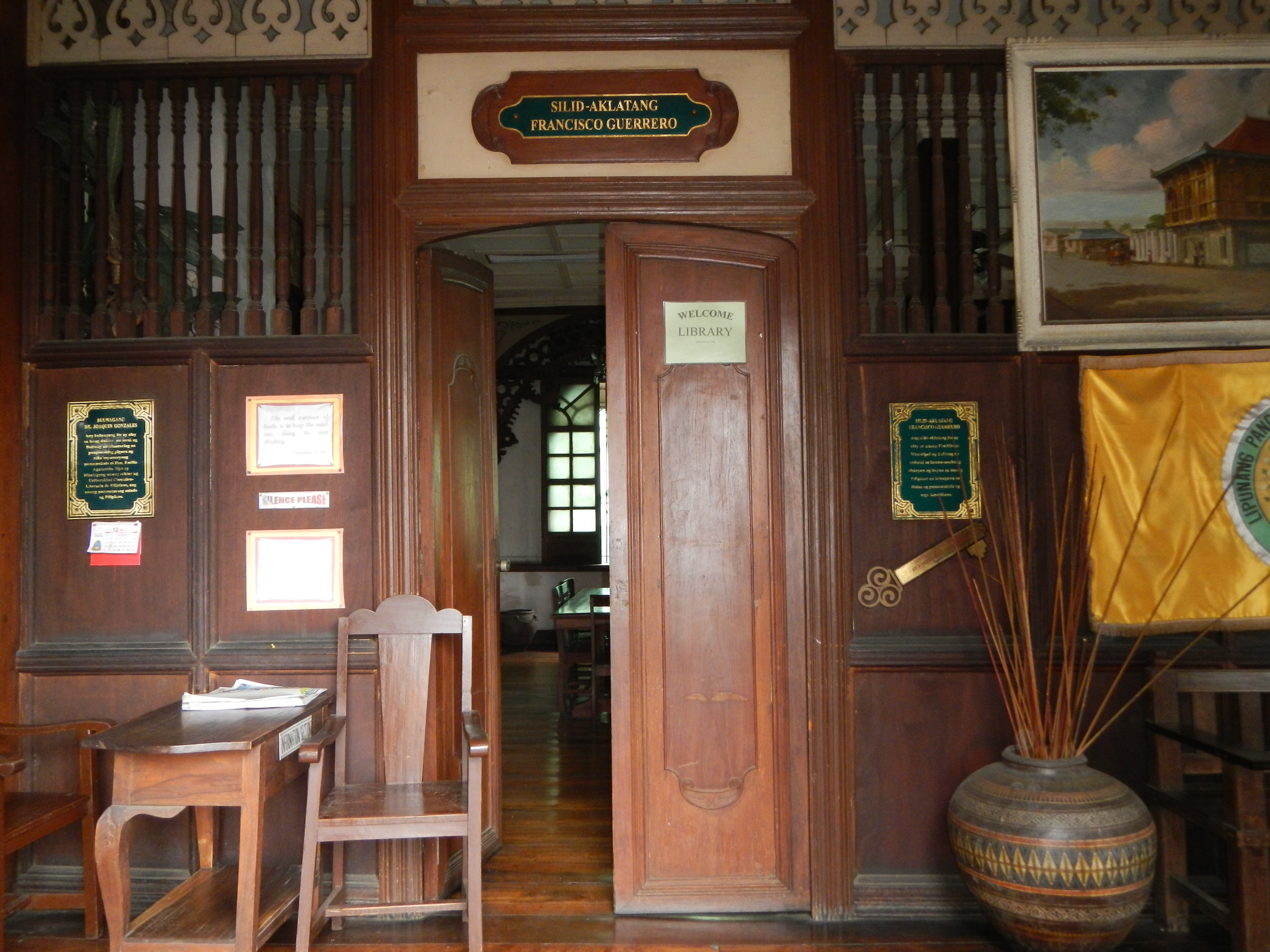
Silid-Aklatang Francisco Guerrero
(English: Francisco Guerrero Library)

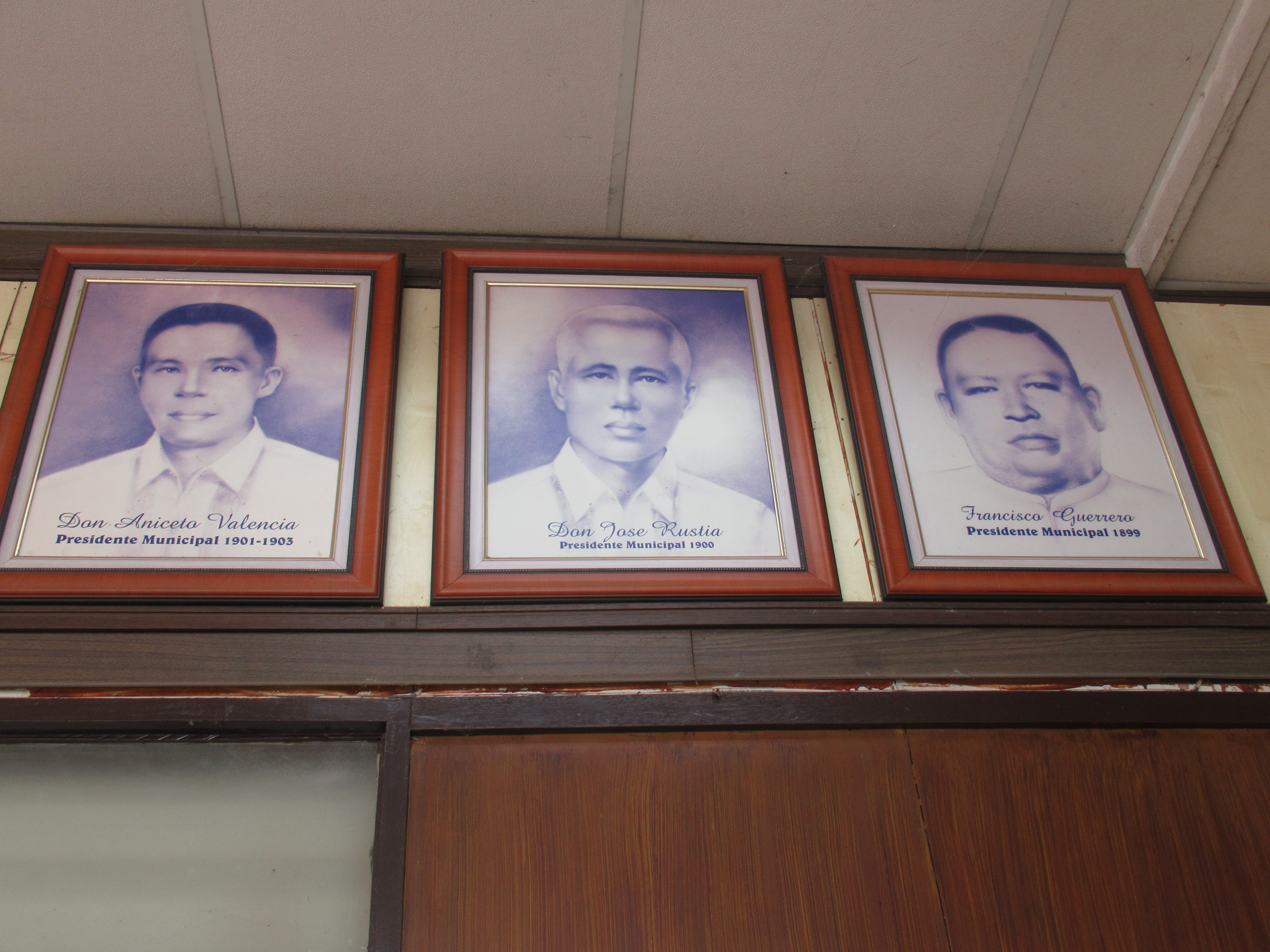
Portraits of Baliwag's mayors, incl. Francisco Guerrero (right)

There were a few attempts to nationally elect local officials during the Spanish colonial period. Following the defeat of Spain in the Spanish–American War and the Philippines later in the Philippine–American War, the Captaincy General of the Philippines and the First Philippine Republic were replaced by the Insular Government of the Philippine Islands (which was established by the United States), multiple had been elections held throughout peaceful areas of the country for provincial and local officials.

The Philippine-American civil and military authorities supervised the first municipal elections, having chosen Baliuag as the site of the 1899 Philippine local elections, the first Philippine elections of May 7, 1899. Francisco Guererro was elected the First Presidente Municipal. The Filipinos gathered at the plaza of the St. Augustine Church after the Holy Mass, and thereafter the officials were selected based on the qualifications for voters set by the Americans.

During the First Philippine Republic, an attempt was made to elect a national legislature but the former did not control the whole Philippine archipelago so no nationwide election could be held. The first fully national election for a fully elected legislative body was in 1907 for the Philippine Assembly, the elected chamber of the bicameral Philippine Legislature during the American colonial period. Starting in 1909, periodic local and Philippine Assembly elections were done concurrently until 1916, until the Jones Law reorganized the Philippine Legislature to the Senate and the House of Representatives, both now popularly elected. This setup continued until the Tydings–McDuffie Act authorized the then U.S. territory to draft a constitution. The ensuing 1935 constitution instituted the Commonwealth of the Philippines, and with it the presidency, vice presidency, and the unicameral National Assembly, then elections were done for these offices later that year.

The National Assembly amended the constitution, reconstituting a bicameral Congress, in 1941. The first elections under this setup was done later that year. World War II intervened, and the Japanese occupation of the Philippines led to the creation of the Second Philippine Republic, with elections done in 1943 for its own National Assembly. In 1945, the Americans defeated the Japanese, President Jose P. Laurel declared the dissolution of the Second Republic, and the Commonwealth was reestablished. Commonwealth elections meant for 1945 were done in April 1946, and independence was granted on July 4, 1946.

From 1947 to 1971, there were biennial elections: every two years, eight out of 24 senators were elected (this setup started in 1951, with 16, then 8 senators elected in 1946 and 1947, respectively), and for every four years starting in 1949, the presidency, vice presidency and the entire House of Representatives were at stake, while for every four years starting 1947, local offices were at stake.

On September 23, 1972, President Ferdinand Marcos declared martial law. The constitutional convention, which had earlier been elected in 1970, submitted its draft constitution. A plebiscite approved this constitution in 1973. A series of referendums consolidated Marcos's rule, and the first local elections were done in 1975. The first parliamentary election to the unicameral Batasang Pambansa, the national parliament, was done in 1978. The first presidential election under the 1973 constitution was done in 1981. A special "snap" presidential election was held in 1986, with Marcos being declared as the winner. There were allegations of massive fraud, and the People Power Revolution drove Marcos from power.

Corazon Aquino succeeded Marcos as president. A new constitution was approved in a plebiscite in 1987. Legislative elections were done later that year, then for every three years thereafter in 1992. Unlike in the 1941 amendments to the 1935 constitution, 12 senators, all members of the House of Representatives, and local officials are to be elected every three years; 24 senators were elected in 1987 and 1992, and 12 were subsequently elected starting in 1995. The president and vice president now have six-year terms, and were first elected in 1992. Party-list representatives were first elected in 1998. This is the current setup.

== Voting ==
=== Qualification ===
Every citizen 18 years old or above on election day who has been a resident of the Philippines for at least a year and for at least six months in the place where she or he is registered, and who is not otherwise disqualified by law, may vote. To actually vote, a citizen has to register. COMELEC has a registration period of several months prior to the election. Those who are not registered do not appear on the voters' list and are ineligible to vote despite being otherwise qualified to do so.

People aged 15 to 30 may vote in Sangguniang Kabataan elections. As with their adult counterparts, COMELEC has a registration period a few months prior to the election.

=== Absentee voters ===
Absentee voters are divided into two types: the local absentee voters and the overseas absentee voters. Local absentee voters include people who are working during election day. These include soldiers, policemen, government employees, mediamen and the like. Overseas absentee voters are Filipinos residing abroad. They are eligible to vote for national positions only (president, vice-president, senators and party-list representatives). Overseas absentee voters may vote in Philippine embassies and consulates, and voting begins as early as 4 months prior to the election. The voting can be as long as 6 months in very few situations.

=== Process ===
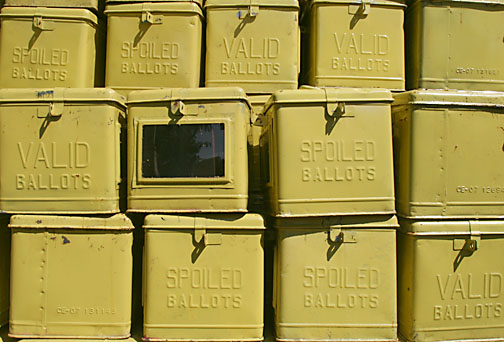
Ballot boxes used for the 2007 Philippine barangay and Sangguniang Kabataan elections in Davao City

Once a registered voter finds their name in the voters' list and locates the correct precinct, they may queue in line for the distribution of the ballot.

Prior to the 2008 Autonomous Region in Muslim Mindanao general election, voters have to write the names of the candidates next to the positions in which they are running. COMELEC-approved nicknames may be used by the voters in writing the names. After the polling period ends, the Board of Election Inspectors (or the teachers manning the polling precinct) counts the ballots by hand. Once all the ballots are counted, the election returns will now be sent to the city or municipal Board of Canvassers, political parties and other groups.

The city or municipal Board of Canvassers canvasses the votes from all polling precincts within their jurisdiction and prepares two documents: a Statement of Votes (SOV) in which all votes from all candidates in all positions per precinct is listed; and a Certificate of Canvass (COC), a document showing the vote totals of all candidates within the Board of Canvassers' jurisdiction.

If the city or municipal Board of Canvassers' jurisdiction is an independent city with its own congressional district, they will send their SOV and COC to the national Board of Canvassers (COMELEC for senate and party-list elections, Congress for presidential and vice presidential elections). If it is otherwise, they will send their SOV and COC to the provincial Board of Canvassers where the votes as stated from the city or municipal COC will be canvassed. The provincial Board of Canvassers sends their SOV and COC to the national Board of Canvassers once canvassing is done. The national Board of Canvassers then canvasses all COCs and declares the winners for national positions.

=== Election automation ===
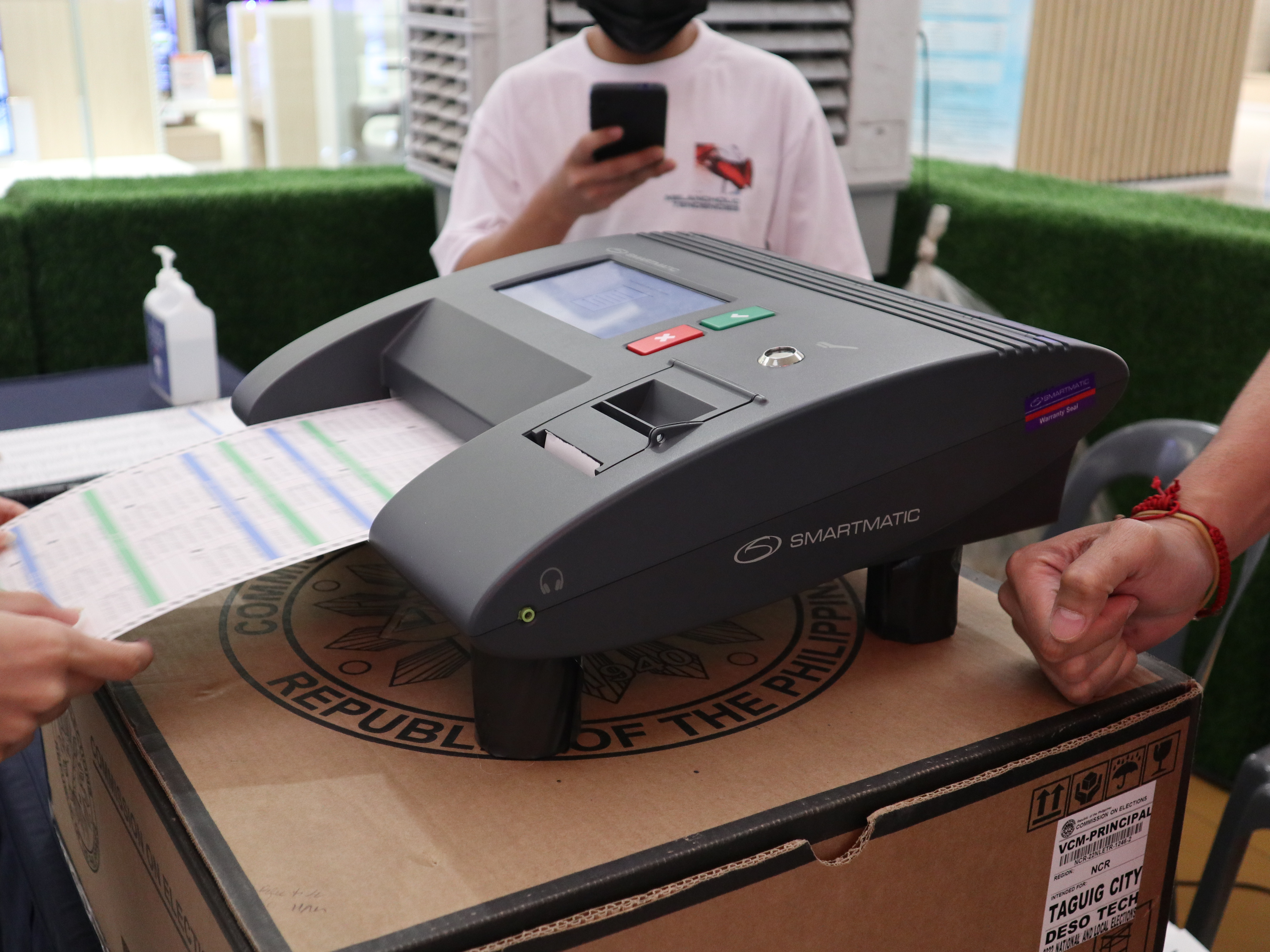
Ballot being inserted in a vote counting machine (VCM)

Since the 2008 Autonomous Region in Muslim Mindanao general election, the voters have to shade the oval that was indicated before the candidate's name, and a voting machine manufactured by Smartmatic automatically counts each ballot as it is fed into it. The results are then printed as the election return and sent electronically to the city or municipal Board of Canvassers.

In 2016, for the fourth time in a row, the Philippines automated their elections using electronic vote counting machines. The deployment of 92,500 of these machines was the largest in the world. Brazil and India, countries which also use technology to process their votes, employ e-voting instead of an automated count.

For the 2019 elections, COMELEC presented its source code for review by accredited U.S. software testing company Pro V&V in an effort to make the automated elections transparent.

For the 2025 midterm elections, COMELEC and Miru Systems Co. Ltd, on March 11, 2024, signed the 2025 automated election system (AES) service contract with Transparency Audit/Count (FASTrAC) at Palacio del Gobernador. On February 22, 2024, the COMELEC en banc held that the Miru Systems Co Ltd, Integrated Computer Systems, St. Timothy Construction Corporation, and Centerpoint Solutions Technologies, Inc. (MIRU-ICS-STCC-CPSTI) is the "Single Calculated and Responsive Bid" with a bid offer of PHP17,988,878,226.55. The contract includes 110,000 automated counting machines, election management systems, consolidation and canvassing systems, ballot printing, ballot boxes and other peripherals.

== Comparison of recent and upcoming election years ==
National and local elections have been held on the second Monday of May every third year since 1992. The presidential and vice-presidential elections are held every six years. Election days on which the president and vice president are not elected are called "midterm elections"; election days on which the president and vice president are elected are called "presidential elections". Barangay-level officials are elected separately from national and local officials.

From 1947 to 1971, elections were held on the second Tuesday of November of every odd-numbered year, with the presidential and vice-presidential elections held every fourth year starting in 1949.

The barangay and Sangguniang Kabataan elections originally scheduled for December 1, 2025, were postponed to November 2, 2026, and subsequently to November 18, 2028. Under the latest law, barangay and Sangguniang Kabataan officials will serve five-year terms.

Elections for positions in the Bangsamoro Autonomous Region in Muslim Mindanao (BARMM) are held separately from national and local elections. The first Bangsamoro Parliament election was held in September 2026, with subsequent parliamentary elections held every five years.

Basic rotation of Philippine general elections (fixed terms only)
| Year | 2025 | 2026 | 2027 | 2028 | 2029 | 2030 | 2031 | 2032 | 2033 |
| Type | Midterm | Regional | None | Presidential and barangay | None | None | Midterm and regional | None | Barangay |
|---|---|---|---|---|---|---|---|---|---|
| President | None | None | None | Yes | None | None | None | None | None |
| Vice president | None | None | None | Yes | None | None | None | None | None |
| Senate | 12 seats (Note: Seats contested during odd-numbered years) | None | None | 12 seats (Note: Seats contested during even-numbered years) | None | None | 12 seats | None | None |
| House | All seats | None | None | All seats | None | None | All seats | None | None |
| Bangsamoro | Postponed to 2026 | All seats | None | None | None | None | All seats | None | None |
| Local (Note: Provinces, cities, and municipalities) | All positions | None | None | All positions | None | None | All positions | None | None |
| Barangay and SK | Postponed to 2026 | Postponed to 2028 | None | All positions | None | None | None | None | All positions |

=== Inauguration ===
| Position | 2025 | 2026 | 2027 | 2028 | 2029 | 2030 | 2031 |
|---|---|---|---|---|---|---|---|
| Type | Midterm | Barangay | None | Presidential | None | Barangay | Midterm |
| President and vice president | None | | | June 30 | None | | |
| Senate | June 30 | None | | June 30 | None | | June 30 |
| House of Representatives | June 30 | None | | June 30 | None | | June 30 |
| Bangsamoro (Regional) | June 30 | None | | June 30 | None | | June 30 |
| Provinces, cities, and municipalities | June 30 | None | | June 30 | None | | June 30 |
| Barangays | None | December 1 | None | | | December 1 | None |

== Electoral exercises ==
| Position | Total |
|---|---|
| President | 1 |
| Vice president | 1 |
| Senators | 12 |
| House of Representatives (district) | 1 |
| House of Representatives (party-list) | 1 |
| Governor | 1* |
| Vice governor | 1* |
| Board members | 1 to 7* |
| Mayor | 1 |
| Vice mayor | 1 |
| Councilors | 4 to 12 |
| Total presidential | 22 to 39 |
| Total midterm | 20 to 37 |
| Parliament (district) | 1 |
| Parliament (party-list) | 1 |
| Total Bangsamoro | 2 |
| Punong Barangay | 1 |
| Barangay councilor (kagawad) | 7 |
| Total barangay | 8 |
| SK chairman | 1 |
| SK councilor (kagawad) | 7 |
| Total SK | 8 |
*Independent cities do not elect provincial officials.

In a presidential election year, a voter may vote for as much as 34 names and a party-list organization. In Bangsamoro elections, a voter may vote for a member of the Bangsamoro Parliament from one's district, and a party-list. In barangay elections, a voter may vote for eight names. A voter for the Sangguniang Kabataan (SK, youth council) may vote for eight names; an SK voter may also vote for barangay officials.

=== Presidential and vice presidential elections ===
Elections for positions in the Executive Department of the Philippine government (i.e. Presidents and Vice presidents) is regulated by Article VII, Section 4 of the 1987 Philippine Constitution. Terms for positions with the Executive Department run for 6 years; with presidents only allowed to serve 1 term of service, and Vice presidents with 2 terms of service. This same Section (4) in the Article (VII) indicates when elections are done: during the "second Monday of May" and their public service begins at noontime of the "thirtieth day of June... and shall end on the same date, six years thereafter."

Each voter is entitled to one vote each for the duration of the election. The voter may split his or her ticket. The candidate with the most votes wins the position; there is no run-off election, and the president and vice president may come from different parties. If two or more candidates emerge with an equal and highest number of votes, one of them will be elected by the Senate and the House of Representatives, voting separately.

The first presidential and vice-presidential election in the Philippines was the Tejeros Convention of 1897; this was for the leadership of the Katipunan, where Emilio Aguinaldo was elected as leader. The first presidential election in which the presidency of the Philippines was at stake was on January 1, 1899, when the Malolos Congress elected Aguinaldo as president.

The first presidential election via a direct election was on September 16, 1935 where Aguinaldo was defeated by Manuel L. Quezon. The first presidential election in the current constitution was on June 30, 1992 where Fidel Ramos defeated six other candidates.

Previous President Gloria Macapagal Arroyo is the only president to serve more than 6 years under the 1987 Constitution. She served as president for almost 10 years due to political instability in 2001, rising to presidency from her vice president position on January 20, 2001. A clause within the Section 4, Article VII allowed her to run for presidency in 2004.

=== Congressional elections ===
==== Senate elections ====
The Senate has 24 members, and 12 members are elected every election; hence, each voter is entitled to twelve votes for the Senate in every election. The voter may not complete the twelve votes for the Senate, but s/he must not surpass the twelve votes or else his/her ballot for that position will be nullified. With the entire country as one at-large district, the twelve candidates with the most votes are elected. This is often not proportional to the results.

From 1951 to 1971, instead of 12 senators elected every three years, the electorate voted for eight senators every two years in the same format. From 1941 to 1949, all elections to the senate were by block voting: the voters may write a name for every seat contested, or they can write the name of the party, which would then give all of the voters' votes to that party's ticket. Compounded with the Nacionalista Party's dominance, this caused a sweep of 24 seats for them in 1941. From 1916 to 1934, voting was via senatorial districts; voters vote for one candidate every three years, except for the first election in 1916 where they'd vote for two candidates; the second-placed candidate would only serve for three years.

The first Senate election was in 1916. The first election under the current constitution was in 1987, while the first election where 12 seats are contested was in 1995.

==== House of Representatives elections ====
Each voter has two votes in the House of Representatives, via parallel vote: 80% of seats are from single-member districts, and 20% are from the party-list system. The vote totals in either election do not influence the number of seats a party wins. A party usually is barred from joining both elections unless granted permission by the Commission on Elections.

A voter may vote a representative from the congressional district of residence. Each district has one seat. The candidate with the highest number of votes in a district wins that district's seat.

A voter may also vote a party-list organization. The voter votes for the party, not for the candidate, and the voter is restricted to one vote. All votes are tallied in an at-large basis, and parties with at least 2% of the vote wins at least one seat in the House. At least two more seats may be granted if the party's proportion of the vote compared to the remaining seats compensates it to get those seats. If there are still spare seats (the party-list representatives comprise 20% of the House), the parties with less than 2% of the vote will get one seat each in descending order until all seats are filled. A party-list organization is limited to representing marginalized sectors of society such as youth, laborers, women, and the like. Each organization submits a list, in ranked order, to the Commission on Elections. This list determines who among the nominees are elected.

Previously, the calculation for the winners in the party-list election was different: the winning parties should have 2% of the national vote and are awarded one seat; any additional 2% is given an additional seat until the maximum of three seats per party is filled up. Since only a few parties surpassed the 2% election threshold, the number of party-list representatives was always less than 20% of the House's membership.

The party-list system was first used in 1998; from 1987 to 1995, the president with the concurrence of the Commission on Appointments, appointed the sectoral representatives. Sectoral representatives were first elected during 1978.

The first legislative election was for the Malolos Congress on June 23 – September 10, 1898. The first election for an entirely elected body was on July 30, 1907; this was also the first general election in the Philippines.

=== Local elections ===
Synchronized with the national elections are the local elections. The voter may vote for any of the following:

- Provincial-level:
  - One governor
  - One vice governor
  - One to seven Sangguniang Panlalawigan members (provincial board)
- City- or municipal-level:
  - One mayor
  - One vice mayor
  - Four to twelve Sangguniang Panlungsod/Sangguniang Bayan members (city or municipal council, respectively)

If the city the voter is residing in a highly urbanized city, or independent component city, or in Pateros, the voter can not vote for any of the provincial-level positions.

The Sangguniang Panlalawigan (provincial board), Sangguniang Panlungsod (city council) and Sangguniang Bayan (municipal council)'s manner of election is identical with that of the Senate. In some cities and provinces, they are split into districts (not necessarily the same as the congressional district) in which separate board members/council members are elected.

==== Barangay elections ====
Barangay elections are held every three years, although usually not in the same time as elections for other positions. Terms of incumbent barangay officials are often extended when Congress suspend the barangay elections as a cost-saving measure. The barangay-level positions are:

- One barangay captain
- Seven barangay councilors; regular members of the Sangguniang Barangay)
- One Sangguniang Kabataan (SK) chairperson (youth council chairperson)
- Seven SK councilors

The SK elections have been postponed or scheduled separately from barangay elections in the past.

The manner of election of the Sangguniang Kabataan in the barangay is identical to the one used in the Senate. Each barangay is entitled to one SK. The SK chairperson is also an ex officio member of the Sangguniang Barangay.

During the Spanish era, there was no elected or appointed national legislature representing the Philippines. The natives were allowed to elect the cabeza de barangay or the barangay (village) chief, but the electorate was almost always from the principalia or the ruling class. Originally hereditary, the position of cabeza de barangay become elective by 1768. In each town, a gobernadorcillo serves as the representative of the Spanish government. It is elected by the 12 most senior cabezas, and the outgoing gobernadorcillo. The position of gobernadorcillo was made elective in 1786. Elections are scheduled independently per town. This system of governance persisted until the enactment of the Maura Law in 1893. The first (and only) election under this new system was on January 1, 1895.

When the Americans defeated the Spanish in the Spanish–American War, and the Filipinos in the Philippine–American War, the Americans began holding elections in pacified areas. The first such elections, which are open to all males above 21 years of age, was held on May 7, 1899.

==== Autonomous regional elections ====
The first general election for the Bangsamoro was scheduled to be in 2022, but was postponed to 2025 to give the Bangsamoro Transition Authority more time to finish its task in restructuring the Bangsamoro government. Elections to the 80-member Bangsamoro Parliament shall be similar to how the members of the House of Representatives are elected, and are expected to be synchronized with the congressional and local elections.

One-half of the membership (40) will be elected via the party-list system, and not more than 40% of the seats (32) are via single-member parliamentary districts. Not more than 10% of the seats are reserved seats, 2 seats for non-Moro indigenous peoples and settler communities, and one seat each for women, youth, traditional leaders and the Ulama, with these seats should be not less than 8 seats.

The Bangsamoro Parliament shall elect the chief minister, the regional head of government, and the wali (governor), the ceremonial head of the region.

In the now defunct Autonomous Region in Muslim Mindanao which was replaced by the Bangsamoro, voters elected the regional governor and regional vice governor via the plurality system, and members of the Regional Legislative Assembly via plurality-at-large voting.

=== Other elections ===
==== Recall elections ====
Elected local government officials may be recalled. A recall election may be called if there is a petition of at least 25% of the registered voters in that LGU. An amendment to the law where a majority of all members of a preparatory recall assembly, composed of all elected local officials within a local government unit (LGU), endorse a recall, was repealed. The recalled official is not allowed to resign when facing a recall election, but may participate in it; the candidate with the highest number of votes wins the recall election.

The president, vice president, members of Congress and cannot be removed via recall. The president and vice president can be removed by impeachment, while members of Congress can be removed via expulsion within their ranks.

The last recall election above the barangay level was the 2015 Puerto Princesa mayoral recall election.

==== Special elections ====
The term "special election" in the Philippines may mean either of the following:

- An election that was supposedly held with the general election but was delayed;
- An election to elect a new official after the predecessor left office (known as "by-elections" elsewhere)

Members of the House of Representatives and of unaffiliated members of the upcoming Bangsamoro Parliament can be elected under the second type of special election whenever the predecessor leaves office, except when the next regularly scheduled election is less than a year away. A special election for president and vice president can only be called if both offices are vacant at the same time, and is outside the 18 months prior to the next regularly scheduled presidential election. Replacement of vacancies in legislatures governed by the Local Government Code is done via appointment, and not by special elections.

The most recent special election to elect a vacancy to the House of Representatives was held in February 2023 for Cavite's 7th congressional district. The last special election for the presidency was in 1986.

==== Indirect elections ====
The barangay and SK chairmen, and the city and municipal councilors have a series of indirect elections among themselves to determine their representatives of the local legislature immediately above their level.

The barangay SK chairpersons in a city or municipality elect among themselves a president that will sit as an ex officio member of the city or municipal council. The city (if applicable) and municipal SK presidents then elect among themselves a president that will sit in the provincial board as an ex officio member. Finally, provincial and city (which are not under the jurisdiction of a province) chairpersons elect among themselves the SK national federation president that will sit as an ex officio member of the National Youth Commission.

The manner of representation of the different barangay chairmen in the municipal, city and provincial legislatures as ex officio members is identical with the way how the SK chairpersons are represented; the provincial and city (which are not under the jurisdiction of a province) chairpersons elect among themselves the president of the National League of the Barangays (Liga ng mga Barangay).

The city (if applicable) and municipal councilors will vote among themselves which will be their representative to the provincial board. Councilors will also elect among themselves the officers of the Philippine Councilors League.

==== Primary elections ====
Primary elections do not currently exist in the Philippines. The leaders of the various political parties select the candidates themselves, and party membership is liquid. In some cases, if a politician is not chosen to be a candidate, he can join another party (such as Ferdinand Marcos, a Liberal, jumped ship to the Nacionalistas in 1965 when the Liberals picked incumbent Diosdado Macapagal as their presidential candidate), or create their own party (such as Fidel Ramos, when he created Lakas ng Tao (now Lakas–CMD) after the Laban ng Demokratikong Pilipino chose Ramon Mitra Jr. as their presidential candidate in 1992).

Primary elections did exist in the Third Republic era in the Liberal and Nacionalista parties.

==== Constitutional conventions ====
Calling a constitutional convention is one of the ways to amend or revise the constitution of the Philippines. While voting is expected to be via the existing legislative districts, Congress decides on how many delegates would be elected, thus how many delegates would be distributed per district. The election is nonpartisan.

During the 1970 Constitutional Convention election, each district had 2 to 16 delegates, elected via plurality-at-large voting. During the 1934 Constitutional Convention election, each district had 2 to 14 delegates, also elected via plurality-at-large-voting.

The body that proposed the current constitution, the Philippine Constitutional Commission of 1986, was appointed by the President, Corazon Aquino. The Malolos Congress was partly elected.

=== Referendums and plebiscites ===
Referendums and plebiscites are conducted to pass certain laws. Any amendments or revision to the constitution, merging, creation and abolition of local government units and autonomous regions and the like are validated via plebiscites. For a referendum and plebiscite to pass, the votes in favor must be greater in number than those which are opposed; there is no requirement for how high the voter turnout should be in such referendums or plebiscites.

The terms "referendum" and "plebiscite" mean different things in the context of Philippine political discourse:

- Referendum is the power of the electorate to approve or reject a legislation through an election called for the purpose.
- Plebiscite is the electoral process by which an initiative on the Constitution is approved or rejected by the people.
  - It is also the term used in determining the creation of a barangay, municipalities, cities, provinces, and autonomous regions.

A referendum is passed if it is approved by a majority of the votes cast; a defeat means the law sought to be rejected or amended remains to be in full effect.

There had been two "waves" of national referendums in the Philippines: the first was during the Commonwealth period, and the latter was during the martial law period. Locally, the most common plebiscites are on creating new provinces and the upgrading of a municipality into a city.

The last provincial-level plebiscite was in 2023 for the conversion of San Jose del Monte as a highly urbanized city; the last national plebiscite was in 1987 for the approval of the constitution endorsed by the 1986 Constitutional Commission.

==== People's initiative ====
Initiatives (locally known as "people's initiative") are governed by the Initiative and Referendum Act of 1989, allowing the people to propose amendments or revisions to the constitution, or propose new laws.

However, the Supreme Court ruled in 1997 that the law was "fatally defective" as far as amending the constitution is concerned.

People's Initiative can also be used to propose new laws are allowed if there is a petition of at least 10% of all registered voters in the country, with at least 3% in every legislative district. A plebiscite will be called it meets such requirements. A people's initiative in the national level has never made it past the stage verification of signatures. This is also possible locally, with varying requirements for each level of local government.

The first and only People's Initiative was in Barangay Milagrosa in Quezon City, which sought to stop the influx of informal settlers and the sale of illegal drugs in that barangay in 2011.

== Perennial issues ==
=== Disinformation and fake news ===
Fake news has the power to influence Philippine elections. In 2025, the Philippines Commission on Elections (COMELEC) stated that misinformation and disinformation can "make or break" the midterm election.

In May 2025, former Congress representative and Bayan Muna party-list nominee Neri Colmenares filed before the COMELEC a complaint against disinformation that targeted Bayan Muna during the 2025 election campaign period. During the election campaigns, social media posts red-tagged Bayan Muna and falsely claimed that the COMELEC had disqualified Bayan Muna in the party-list race.

Fact-checking group Tsek.ph stated that Vice President Leni Robredo was the "biggest victim" of disinformation during the 2022 Philippine presidential election campaign and that former Senator Bongbong Marcos gained the most from misinformation on social media.

On May 5, 2026, Cong. Terry Ridon, called out Peanut Gallery Media Network (PGMN) over fake news reports. Cong. Janette Garin also filed a resolution asking Congress to convene the tri-committee to investigate fake news and influencers once more. PGMN, its founder, Franco Mabanta, and its hosts, has been accused of partisanship, bias, and operating as a political hitmen, despite pronouncement of being a news media outlet that upholds free speech absolutism. Mabanta later figured in an alleged extortion attempt on Cong. Martin Romualdez, to prevent a critical video from being uploaded on the PGMN site and social media accounts.

=== Campaign finance and vote buying ===
Campaign finance in the Philippines is regulated under several laws, including the Omnibus Election Code and the Synchronized Elections Law (Republic Act No. 7166). The law prohibits persons or organizations with government contracts from contributing to candidates' campaigns. Corporations may donate up to 5% of their taxable income under COMELEC Resolution No. 10772 and the Corporation Code of the Philippines.

In 2025, amid the flood control projects scandal in the Philippines, Chiz Escudero was ousted as Senate president after a witness testified that Escudero received a campaign contribution of ₱30 million from a top contractor for government flood-control projects. In the 2022 elections, elected officials who received millions in campaign contributions from contractors include President Bongbong Marcos, Vice President Sara Duterte, and senators Win Gatchalian, Loren Legarda, Robin Padilla, and Migz Zubiri. Despite the COMELEC ban on giving or receiving donations from contractors, Glenn Escandor gave Sara Duterte a donation for her campaign. Escandor's Esdevco Realty Corporation paid for advertisements worth ₱19.9 million (US$404,060.91) for Sara Duterte's 2022 campaign for vice president. Genesis88 Construction Inc., also owned by Escandor, was a major contractor for the DPWH during Rodrigo Duterte's presidency. Rudhil Construction & Enterprises owner Rodulfo Hilot Jr. gave ₱20 million to Marcos's campaign, while Quirante Construction owner Jonathan Quirante contributed ₱1 million. Rudhil Construction & Enterprises and Quirante Construction were awarded substantial government contracts after the elections.

Spending limits are set at ₱10 per voter for presidential and vice-presidential candidates, ₱3 per voter for local candidates, and ₱5 per voter for political parties and independent candidates. Candidates and political parties must submit an itemized Statement of Election Contributions and Expenditures (SOCE) within 30 days after election day. Failure to submit the SOCE bars candidates from assuming office. Watchdog groups such as LENTE, Kontra Daya, and the Institute for Political and Electoral Reform monitor compliance through SOCE and SALN reviews.

Vote buying remains a persistent issue. COMELEC defines it as giving or promising money, jobs, favors, or items of value in exchange for votes. It is a punishable election offense under Article 12 of the Omnibus Election Code. Enforcement is weak and violators are rarely punished. In 2025, the European Union Election Observation Mission described vote buying in the Philippines as "endemic" and "well-entrenched."

In 2025, Vote Report PH recorded instances of improper use of government resources, alleging that incumbent officials used Ayuda sa Kapos ang Kita Program (AKAP) to endorse candidates or party-list groups during the election campaign period, constituting misuse of public resources. COMELEC issued 200 show-cause orders against candidates in the 2025 elections over allegations of vote-buying, vote-selling, and abuse of state resources.

=== Voter disenfranchisement ===
Voter disenfranchisement in the Philippines persists due to administrative inefficiencies, legal constraints, and electoral malpractice. In the early 2000s, an estimated 4.5 million eligible voters, mostly first-time registrants, were unable to complete the registration process because of inadequate information dissemination and logistical issues.

Legal provisions, including the Omnibus Election Code and the Voter's Registration Act of 1996, restrict suffrage. Individuals convicted of crimes punishable by imprisonment of at least one year are disqualified from voting. Those who have served their sentence may regain the right to vote only after a five-year waiting period.

In the 2025 midterm elections, voter disenfranchisement included missing names from voters' lists and technical issues with vote counting machines. For overseas Filipinos, COMELEC introduced online voting, but access issues and digital literacy may have limited participation.

=== Violence and intimidation ===
Philippine elections have frequently been marred by acts of violence. These incidents remain a serious concern. The Maguindanao massacre is considered the worst case of election-related violence in the Philippines, during which 58 people were ambushed and killed while on their way to file a certificate of candidacy for Esmael Mangudadatu.

During the 2025 elections, media reported the killing of 10 people on election day, while the National Citizens' Movement for Free Elections reported 240 election-related deaths during the campaign period from October 2024 to May 2025. Reports of voter intimidation were also documented, especially in rural areas and localities dominated by political dynasties. Tactics included coercion by armed groups, threats against voters, and the presence of uniformed personnel near polling stations, contributing to a climate of fear.

According to Danilo Arao of Kontra Daya and Vote Report PH, "The situation remains that political elites operate their own bailiwicks, private armies, and patronage networks, which fuel the highest levels of violence in the archipelago's rural areas".

==== Red-tagging ====
Red-tagging has been used as a "weapon" against opposition candidates during election campaigns, according to media watchdogs and members of the political opposition. Red-tagging has also been used to divert public attention from economic hardships and extrajudicial killings attributed to incumbent candidates.

During the 2022 Philippine presidential election, the red-tagging of presidential candidate Leni Robredo by incumbent officials were frequently featured on the Manila Times and the Daily Tribune, according to media observers. A report by the ASEAN Parliamentarians for Human Rights said that Robredo was the "prime target of intensified disinformation and red-tagging in social media leading up to election day." The report also said that candidates and elected representatives of the Makabayan bloc were also red-tagged. Former Congress representative and senatorial candidate Neri Colmenares said that red-tagging increased during elections and targeted opposition candidates who protested the Philippine government's poor COVID pandemic response, the Anti-Terrorism Law, and the extrajudicial killing of activists. Colmenares said that candidates of the Otso Diretso senatorial slate were also red-tagged during the 2019 election campaign, and that the red-tagging died down after the election.

In February 2025, the Philippine Commission on Elections (COMELEC) issued Resolution No. 11116, which made red-tagging and discrimination during election campaigns offenses punishable with imprisonment of one to six years and disqualification from public office. COMELEC Chair George Erwin Garcia said that the policy is based on the Supreme Court ruling that defined red-tagging as an act that threatens individuals.

In March 2025, during the campaign for the 2025 Philippine general election, Bayan Muna party-list nominee Neri Colmenares filed a complaint urging COMELEC to investigate allegations of red-tagging and vilification constituting "massive and widespread black propaganda" and the destruction of campaign materials. Vote Report PH noted reports of red-tagging, harassment, and disinformation prior to the elections, alongside vote buying and abuse of government resources in campaigns.

The International Coalition for Human Rights in the Philippines stated that red-tagging was the most common election violation as of April 30, 2025, making up 78.7% of the election violations it had recorded. "This level of systematic red-tagging is not only a violation of human rights, it's a coordinated effort to intimidate and discredit democratic actors," the group said.

=== Candidates with criminal cases ===
Under the Omnibus Election Code, candidates with criminal records may run for and hold public office, except if they have been "sentenced by final judgment for subversion, insurrection, rebellion, or for any offense with a penalty of more than 18 months, or for a crime involving moral turpitude, or have been granted plenary pardon or amnesty". After the Sandiganbayan convicted Edgar Teves for graft and corruption, COMELEC disqualified him from running for office. The Supreme Court reversed this disqualification in 2009.

==== Estrada conviction and absolute pardon ====
In 2007, the Sandiganbayan convicted deposed President Joseph Estrada of plunder and sentenced him to reclusion perpetua, which included "perpetual disqualification from public office". Estrada applied for pardon with a promise not to run for office. He was granted absolute pardon by President Gloria Arroyo and later ran for president in 2010, losing the election. He successfully ran for Manila mayor in 2013.

=== The "hijacking" of the party-list system by political dynasties ===
The party-list system was instituted in the Philippine Constitution after the ousting of the Marcos dictatorship. It aims to give representation to marginalized groups. In 2013, the Supreme Court ruled that party-list candidates did not have to present a track record of representing marginalized sectors. Over time the party-list system became dominated by political dynasties, big business, and groups with links to the police or the military. In the May 2025 party-list elections, 40 of the 63 party-list groups proclaimed by the COMELEC were among those alleged by Kontra Daya to have links to political dynasties or other vested interests.

Bayan Muna Party-list Representative Carlos Zarate sought to amend the Party-List System Act by filing in 2018 the Genuine Party-List Group and Nominee Act. The bill aims to ensure that party-list groups and nominees represented marginalized and underrepresented sectors. The bill stalled in the House of Representatives as of February 2025.

House Bill No. 6193, filed by the Makabayan bloc in November 2025, aims to amend the party-list system law to serve marginalized sectors, disqualify candidates related to incumbent government officials, and disqualify candidates linked to government contractors.

== Election watchdogs ==
Along with the mass media, the National Citizens' Movement for Free Elections (NAMFREL), the Parish Pastoral Council for Responsible Voting (PPCRV), and Kontra Daya are groups that work as watchdogs during elections in the Philippines. Other election watchdogs set up by civil society organizations are the Automated Election System (AES) Watch, Legal Network for Truthful Elections (Lente) and the Workers' Electoral Watch (We Watch). The European Union sent an election observation mission to the Philippines for the first time in 2025.

== Latest elections ==
=== President ===
| Candidate | Party | Votes | % |
|---|---|---|---|
| Bongbong Marcos | Partido Federal ng Pilipinas | 31,629,783 | 58.77 |
| Leni Robredo | Independent (Note: Liberal Party member running as an independent) | 15,035,773 | 27.94 |
| Manny Pacquiao | PROMDI | 3,663,113 | 6.81 |
| Isko Moreno | Aksyon Demokratiko | 1,933,909 | 3.59 |
| Panfilo Lacson | Independent (Note: Originally ran under Partido para sa Demokratikong Reporma; resigned from the party mid-way through the campaign. Still labeled as a Reporma candidate on the official ballots.) | 892,375 | 1.66 |
| Faisal Mangondato | Katipunan ng Kamalayang Kayumanggi | 301,629 | 0.56 |
| Ernesto Abella | Independent | 114,627 | 0.21 |
| Leody de Guzman | Partido Lakas ng Masa | 93,027 | 0.17 |
| Norberto Gonzales | Partido Demokratiko Sosyalista ng Pilipinas | 90,656 | 0.17 |
| Jose Montemayor Jr. | Democratic Party of the Philippines | 60,592 | 0.11 |
| Total | | 53,815,484 | 100.00 |
| Valid votes | | 53,815,484 | 96.05 |
| Invalid/blank votes | | 2,213,371 | 3.95 |
| Total votes | | 56,028,855 | 100.00 |
| Registered voters/turnout | | 67,523,697 | 82.98 |
Source: Congress (vote totals); COMELEC (election day turnout, absentee turnout)

=== Vice president ===
| Candidate | Party | Votes | % |
|---|---|---|---|
| Sara Duterte (Note: Running mate of Bongbong Marcos (Partido Federal ng Pilipinas)) | Lakas–CMD | 32,208,417 | 61.53 |
| Kiko Pangilinan (Note: Running mate of Leni Robredo (Independent)) | Liberal Party | 9,329,207 | 17.82 |
| Tito Sotto (Note: Running mate of Panfilo Lacson (Independent)) | Nationalist People's Coalition | 8,251,267 | 15.76 |
| Willie Ong | Aksyon Demokratiko | 1,878,531 | 3.59 |
| Lito Atienza | PROMDI | 270,381 | 0.52 |
| Manny SD Lopez | Labor Party Philippines | 159,670 | 0.31 |
| Walden Bello | Partido Lakas ng Masa | 100,827 | 0.19 |
| Carlos Serapio | Katipunan ng Kamalayang Kayumanggi | 90,989 | 0.17 |
| Rizalito David | Democratic Party of the Philippines | 56,711 | 0.11 |
| Total | | 52,346,000 | 100.00 |
| Valid votes | | 52,346,000 | 93.43 |
| Invalid/blank votes | | 3,682,855 | 6.57 |
| Total votes | | 56,028,855 | 100.00 |
| Registered voters/turnout | | 67,523,697 | 82.98 |
Source: Congress (vote totals); COMELEC (election day turnout, absentee turnout)

=== Senate ===
| Candidate | Party or alliance | | Votes | % |
|---|---|---|---|---|
| Bong Go | DuterTen | PDP–Laban | 27,121,073 | 47.29 |
| Bam Aquino | KiBam | Katipunan ng Nagkakaisang Pilipino | 20,971,899 | 36.57 |
| Ronald dela Rosa | DuterTen | PDP–Laban | 20,773,946 | 36.22 |
| Erwin Tulfo | Alyansa para sa Bagong Pilipinas | Lakas–CMD | 17,118,881 | 29.85 |
| Kiko Pangilinan | KiBam | Liberal Party | 15,343,229 | 26.75 |
| Rodante Marcoleta | DuterTen | Independent | 15,250,723 | 26.59 |
| Panfilo Lacson | Alyansa para sa Bagong Pilipinas | Independent | 15,106,111 | 26.34 |
| Tito Sotto | Alyansa para sa Bagong Pilipinas | Nationalist People's Coalition | 14,832,996 | 25.86 |
| Pia Cayetano | Alyansa para sa Bagong Pilipinas | Nacionalista Party | 14,573,430 | 25.41 |
| Camille Villar | Alyansa para sa Bagong Pilipinas (Note: Guest candidate of DuterTen) | Nacionalista Party | 13,651,274 | 23.80 |
| Lito Lapid | Alyansa para sa Bagong Pilipinas | Nationalist People's Coalition | 13,394,102 | 23.35 |
| Imee Marcos | Nacionalista Party | | 13,339,227 | 23.26 |
| Ben Tulfo | Independent | | 12,090,090 | 21.08 |
| Bong Revilla | Alyansa para sa Bagong Pilipinas | Lakas–CMD | 12,027,845 | 20.97 |
| Abigail Binay | Alyansa para sa Bagong Pilipinas | Nationalist People's Coalition | 11,808,645 | 20.59 |
| Benhur Abalos | Alyansa para sa Bagong Pilipinas | Partido Federal ng Pilipinas | 11,580,520 | 20.19 |
| Jimmy Bondoc | DuterTen | PDP–Laban | 10,615,598 | 18.51 |
| Manny Pacquiao | Alyansa para sa Bagong Pilipinas | Partido Federal ng Pilipinas | 10,397,133 | 18.13 |
| Phillip Salvador | DuterTen | PDP–Laban | 10,241,491 | 17.86 |
| Bonifacio Bosita | Riding-in-Tandem Team | Independent | 9,805,903 | 17.10 |
| Heidi Mendoza | Independent | | 8,759,732 | 15.27 |
| Willie Revillame | Independent | | 8,568,924 | 14.94 |
| Vic Rodriguez | DuterTen | Independent | 8,450,668 | 14.74 |
| Raul Lambino | DuterTen | PDP–Laban | 8,383,593 | 14.62 |
| Francis Tolentino | Alyansa para sa Bagong Pilipinas | Partido Federal ng Pilipinas | 7,702,550 | 13.43 |
| Jayvee Hinlo | DuterTen | PDP–Laban | 7,471,704 | 13.03 |
| Willie Ong (Note: Withdrew but remained on the ballot) | Aksyon Demokratiko | | 7,371,944 | 12.85 |
| Gregorio Honasan | Reform PH Party | | 6,700,772 | 11.68 |
| Luke Espiritu | Partido Lakas ng Masa | | 6,481,413 | 11.30 |
| Richard Mata | DuterTen | Independent | 5,789,181 | 10.09 |
| Apollo Quiboloy | DuterTen | Independent | 5,719,041 | 9.97 |
| Teodoro Casiño | Makabayan | | 4,648,271 | 8.10 |
| Arlene Brosas | Makabayan | | 4,343,773 | 7.57 |
| Leody de Guzman | Partido Lakas ng Masa | | 4,136,899 | 7.21 |
| Danilo Ramos | Makabayan | | 4,091,257 | 7.13 |
| Ariel Querubin | Riding-in-Tandem Team | Nacionalista Party | 3,950,051 | 6.89 |
| Liza Maza | Makabayan | | 3,927,784 | 6.85 |
| Sonny Matula | Workers' and Peasants' Party | | 3,865,792 | 6.74 |
| Ronnel Arambulo | Makabayan | | 3,846,216 | 6.71 |
| France Castro | Makabayan | | 3,670,972 | 6.40 |
| Angelo de Alban | Independent | | 2,556,983 | 4.46 |
| Roberto Ballon | Independent | | 2,389,847 | 4.17 |
| Norman Marquez | Independent | | 1,150,095 | 2.01 |
| Eric Martinez | Independent | | 1,032,201 | 1.80 |
| Norberto Gonzales | Partido Demokratiko Sosyalista ng Pilipinas | | 990,091 | 1.73 |
| Jocelyn Andamo | Makabayan | | 829,084 | 1.45 |
| Allen Capuyan | Partido Pilipino sa Pagbabago | | 818,437 | 1.43 |
| Ernesto Arellano | Katipunan ng Kamalayang Kayumanggi | | 801,677 | 1.40 |
| Jerome Adonis | Makabayan | | 779,868 | 1.36 |
| Mimi Doringo | Makabayan | | 744,506 | 1.30 |
| Arnel Escobal | Partido Maharlika | | 731,453 | 1.28 |
| Jose Montemayor Jr. | Independent | | 671,818 | 1.17 |
| Wilson Amad | Independent | | 618,943 | 1.08 |
| Mar Valbuena | Independent | | 611,432 | 1.07 |
| David D'Angelo | Bunyog Party | | 607,642 | 1.06 |
| Wilbert T. Lee | Aksyon Demokratiko | | 587,098 | 1.02 |
| Marc Gamboa | Aksyon Demokratiko | Independent | 571,637 | 1.00 |
| Amirah Lidasan | Makabayan | | 564,948 | 0.99 |
| Mody Floranda | Makabayan | | 554,385 | 0.97 |
| Nur-Ana Sahidulla | Independent | | 476,855 | 0.83 |
| Michael Tapado | Partido Maharlika | | 460,662 | 0.80 |
| Relly Jose Jr. | Kilusang Bagong Lipunan | | 458,383 | 0.80 |
| Jose Olivar | Independent | | 448,794 | 0.78 |
| Subair Mustapha | Workers' and Peasants' Party | | 414,027 | 0.72 |
| Roy Cabonegro | Democratic Party of the Philippines | | 383,534 | 0.67 |
| Leandro Verceles Jr. | Independent | | 310,562 | 0.54 |
| Total | | | 428,489,615 | 100.00 |
| Total votes | | | 57,350,958 | – |
| Registered voters/turnout | | | 69,673,655 | 82.31 |
Source: COMELEC

=== House of Representatives ===
==== Congressional districts ====
| Party | Votes | % | +/– | Seats | +/– |
|---|---|---|---|---|---|
| Lakas–CMD | 16,596,698 | 32.87 | +23.70 | 103 | +77 |
| National Unity Party | 6,080,987 | 12.05 | +0.13 | 32 | −1 |
| Nationalist People's Coalition | 5,974,201 | 11.83 | −0.60 | 31 | −4 |
| Partido Federal ng Pilipinas | 5,286,538 | 10.47 | +9.53 | 27 | +25 |
| Nacionalista Party | 4,724,803 | 9.36 | −4.38 | 22 | −14 |
| Liberal Party | 1,555,941 | 3.08 | −0.70 | 6 | −4 |
| Aksyon Demokratiko | 1,341,540 | 2.66 | +0.72 | 2 | +2 |
| PDP–Laban | 666,067 | 1.32 | −21.45 | 2 | −64 |
| Hugpong sa Tawong Lungsod | 542,710 | 1.07 | +0.93 | 3 | +3 |
| Laban ng Demokratikong Pilipino | 314,981 | 0.62 | −0.16 | 2 | +1 |
| People's Reform Party | 292,665 | 0.58 | −1.38 | 1 | −2 |
| Pwersa ng Masang Pilipino | 269,949 | 0.53 | +0.52 | 2 | +2 |
| United Bangsamoro Justice Party | 236,857 | 0.47 | −0.14 | 0 | 0 |
| Unang Sigaw | 183,912 | 0.36 | −0.29 | 0 | 0 |
| Makatizens United Party | 150,189 | 0.30 | New | 2 | New |
| Sama Sama Tarlac | 143,868 | 0.28 | New | 0 | 0 |
| United Nationalist Alliance | 142,655 | 0.28 | +0.14 | 1 | 0 |
| Katipunan ng Nagkakaisang Pilipino | 134,137 | 0.27 | +0.26 | 0 | 0 |
| National Unity Party/United Negros Alliance | 130,023 | 0.26 | −0.27 | 1 | −1 |
| Centrist Democratic Party of the Philippines | 127,646 | 0.25 | −0.02 | 1 | 0 |
| Partido Navoteño | 116,622 | 0.23 | +0.06 | 1 | 0 |
| One Capiz | 109,249 | 0.22 | New | 0 | 0 |
| Reform PH Party | 107,966 | 0.21 | New | 0 | 0 |
| Lakas–CMD/One Cebu | 104,768 | 0.21 | New | 1 | New |
| Adelante Zamboanga Party | 100,035 | 0.20 | +0.05 | 1 | 0 |
| Padajon Surigao | 99,856 | 0.20 | New | 0 | 0 |
| Galing at Serbisyo para sa Mindoreño | 91,073 | 0.18 | New | 0 | 0 |
| Filipino Rights Protection Advocates of Manila Movement | 87,183 | 0.17 | New | 0 | 0 |
| Nationalist People's Coalition/One Cebu | 74,936 | 0.15 | New | 1 | New |
| Asenso Manileño | 70,780 | 0.14 | New | 1 | 0 |
| Akay National Political Party | 68,524 | 0.14 | New | 0 | 0 |
| Workers' and Peasants' Party | 50,618 | 0.10 | +0.00 | 0 | 0 |
| Kusog Bicolandia | 33,789 | 0.07 | New | 0 | 0 |
| Partido Lakas ng Masa | 28,746 | 0.06 | +0.05 | 0 | 0 |
| Asenso Abrenio | 23,308 | 0.05 | New | 0 | 0 |
| Makabayan | 22,698 | 0.04 | New | 0 | 0 |
| Partido Demokratiko Sosyalista ng Pilipinas | 14,343 | 0.03 | −0.13 | 0 | 0 |
| Partido para sa Demokratikong Reporma | 12,672 | 0.03 | −0.96 | 0 | 0 |
| Independent | 4,371,611 | 8.66 | +4.23 | 11 | +5 |
| Party-list seats | | | | 64 | +1 |
| Total | 50,485,144 | 100.00 | – | 318 | +1 |
| Valid votes | 50,485,144 | 88.46 | +1.48 | | |
| Invalid/blank votes | 6,585,150 | 11.54 | −1.48 | | |
| Total votes | 57,070,294 | 100.00 | – | | |
| Registered voters/turnout | 68,431,965 | 83.40 | −0.70 | | |
Source: COMELEC (results per district, registered voters)

==== Party-list ====
| Party | Votes | % | Seats | +/– |
|---|---|---|---|---|
| Akbayan | 2,779,621 | 7.02 | 3 | +2 |
| Tingog Party List | 1,822,708 | 4.60 | 3 | +1 |
| 4Ps Partylist | 1,469,571 | 3.71 | 2 | 0 |
| ACT-CIS Partylist | 1,239,930 | 3.13 | 2 | −1 |
| Ako Bicol | 1,073,119 | 2.71 | 2 | 0 |
| Uswag Ilonggo | 777,754 | 1.96 | 1 | 0 |
| Solid North Party | 765,322 | 1.93 | 1 | New |
| Trabaho Partylist | 709,283 | 1.79 | 1 | +1 |
| Citizens' Battle Against Corruption | 593,911 | 1.50 | 1 | 0 |
| Malasakit at Bayanihan | 580,100 | 1.46 | 1 | 0 |
| Senior Citizens Partylist | 577,753 | 1.46 | 1 | 0 |
| Puwersa ng Pilipinong Pandagat | 575,762 | 1.45 | 1 | New |
| Mamamayang Liberal | 547,949 | 1.38 | 1 | New |
| FPJ Panday Bayanihan | 538,003 | 1.36 | 1 | New |
| United Senior Citizens Partylist | 533,913 | 1.35 | 1 | 0 |
| 4K Partylist | 521,592 | 1.32 | 1 | New |
| LPG Marketers Association | 517,833 | 1.31 | 1 | 0 |
| Coop-NATCCO | 509,913 | 1.29 | 1 | 0 |
| Ako Bisaya | 477,796 | 1.21 | 1 | 0 |
| Construction Workers Solidarity | 477,517 | 1.21 | 1 | 0 |
| Pinoy Workers Partylist | 475,985 | 1.20 | 1 | New |
| AGAP Partylist | 469,412 | 1.19 | 1 | 0 |
| Asenso Pinoy | 423,133 | 1.07 | 1 | +1 |
| Agimat Partylist | 420,813 | 1.06 | 1 | 0 |
| TGP Partylist | 407,922 | 1.03 | 1 | 0 |
| SAGIP Partylist | 405,297 | 1.02 | 1 | −1 |
| ALONA Partylist | 393,684 | 0.99 | 1 | 0 |
| 1-Rider Partylist | 385,700 | 0.97 | 1 | −1 |
| Kamanggagawa | 382,657 | 0.97 | 1 | New |
| Galing sa Puso Party | 381,880 | 0.96 | 1 | 0 |
| Kamalayan | 381,437 | 0.96 | 1 | +1 |
| Bicol Saro | 366,177 | 0.92 | 1 | 0 |
| Kusug Tausug | 365,916 | 0.92 | 1 | 0 |
| Alliance of Concerned Teachers | 353,631 | 0.89 | 1 | 0 |
| One Coop | 334,098 | 0.84 | 1 | +1 |
| KM Ngayon Na | 324,405 | 0.82 | 1 | +1 |
| Abante Mindanao | 320,349 | 0.81 | 1 | New |
| Bagong Henerasyon | 319,803 | 0.81 | 1 | 0 |
| Trade Union Congress Party | 314,814 | 0.79 | 1 | 0 |
| Kabataan | 312,344 | 0.79 | 1 | 0 |
| APEC Partylist | 310,427 | 0.78 | 1 | 0 |
| Magbubukid | 310,289 | 0.78 | 1 | New |
| 1Tahanan | 309,761 | 0.78 | 1 | +1 |
| Ako Ilocano Ako | 301,406 | 0.76 | 1 | 0 |
| Manila Teachers Party-List | 301,291 | 0.76 | 1 | 0 |
| Nanay Partylist | 293,430 | 0.74 | 1 | New |
| Kapuso PM | 293,149 | 0.74 | 1 | New |
| SSS-GSIS Pensyonado | 290,359 | 0.73 | 1 | New |
| DUMPER Partylist | 279,532 | 0.71 | 1 | 0 |
| Abang Lingkod | 274,735 | 0.69 | 1 | 0 |
| Pusong Pinoy | 266,623 | 0.67 | 1 | 0 |
| Swerte | 261,379 | 0.66 | 1 | New |
| Philreca Party-List | 261,045 | 0.66 | 1 | 0 |
| Gabriela Women's Party (Note: Proclaimed as winner on September 17, 2025 by virtue of the COMELEC declaring a 64th seat being up) | 256,811 | 0.65 | 1 | 0 |
| Abono Partylist (Note: Proclaimed as winner on October 2, 2025 by virtue of Duterte Youth's disqualification) | 254,474 | 0.64 | 1 | 0 |
| Ang Probinsyano Party-list | 250,886 | 0.63 | 1 | 0 |
| Murang Kuryente Partylist | 247,754 | 0.63 | 1 | New |
| OFW Partylist | 246,609 | 0.62 | 0 | −1 |
| Apat-Dapat | 245,060 | 0.62 | 0 | 0 |
| Tupad | 243,152 | 0.61 | 0 | 0 |
| Kalinga Partylist | 235,186 | 0.59 | 0 | −1 |
| 1-Pacman Party List | 233,096 | 0.59 | 0 | −1 |
| ANGAT Partylist | 229,707 | 0.58 | 0 | −1 |
| Magsasaka Partylist | 225,371 | 0.57 | 0 | −1 |
| P3PWD | 214,605 | 0.54 | 0 | −1 |
| Barangay Health Wellness Partylist | 203,719 | 0.51 | 0 | −1 |
| Democratic Independent Workers Association | 195,829 | 0.49 | 0 | 0 |
| Epanaw Sambayanan | 188,505 | 0.48 | 0 | 0 |
| Probinsyano Ako | 185,606 | 0.47 | 0 | −1 |
| Toda Aksyon | 183,111 | 0.46 | 0 | 0 |
| Pinuno Partylist | 181,066 | 0.46 | 0 | −1 |
| Serbisyo sa Bayan Party | 175,520 | 0.44 | 0 | 0 |
| Abante Pangasinan-Ilokano Party | 170,795 | 0.43 | 0 | −1 |
| AGRI Partylist | 168,032 | 0.42 | 0 | −1 |
| Asap Na | 164,030 | 0.41 | 0 | 0 |
| Bayan Muna | 162,894 | 0.41 | 0 | 0 |
| Eduaksyon | 161,517 | 0.41 | 0 | 0 |
| Akay ni Sol | 159,748 | 0.40 | 0 | 0 |
| Ahon Mahirap | 157,991 | 0.40 | 0 | 0 |
| 1Munti Partylist | 157,665 | 0.40 | 0 | 0 |
| H.E.L.P. Pilipinas | 157,308 | 0.40 | 0 | 0 |
| A Teacher Partylist | 157,116 | 0.40 | 0 | 0 |
| Babae Ako | 157,041 | 0.40 | 0 | 0 |
| Anakalusugan | 154,121 | 0.39 | 0 | −1 |
| Pilipinas Babangon Muli | 154,025 | 0.39 | 0 | 0 |
| Batang Quiapo Partylist | 153,637 | 0.39 | 0 | 0 |
| Lunas | 151,494 | 0.38 | 0 | 0 |
| Kabalikat ng Mamamayan | 141,847 | 0.36 | 0 | −1 |
| WIFI | 141,041 | 0.36 | 0 | 0 |
| Aangat Tayo | 140,597 | 0.35 | 0 | 0 |
| Laang Kawal | 136,484 | 0.34 | 0 | 0 |
| Ako Padayon | 134,292 | 0.34 | 0 | 0 |
| Solo Parents | 131,659 | 0.33 | 0 | 0 |
| Pamilya Ko | 124,228 | 0.31 | 0 | 0 |
| Pamilyang Magsasaka | 117,440 | 0.30 | 0 | 0 |
| ANGKASANGGA | 115,720 | 0.29 | 0 | 0 |
| Kasambahay | 111,269 | 0.28 | 0 | 0 |
| Bangon Bagong Minero | 111,174 | 0.28 | 0 | 0 |
| Pamilya Muna | 108,483 | 0.27 | 0 | 0 |
| Kababaihan | 107,848 | 0.27 | 0 | 0 |
| AA-Kasosyo Party | 107,262 | 0.27 | 0 | 0 |
| Tulungan Tayo | 106,504 | 0.27 | 0 | 0 |
| Health Workers | 105,512 | 0.27 | 0 | 0 |
| 1Agila | 104,868 | 0.26 | 0 | 0 |
| Boses Party-List | 102,588 | 0.26 | 0 | 0 |
| Buhay Party-List | 99,365 | 0.25 | 0 | 0 |
| Ipatupad For Workers | 96,735 | 0.24 | 0 | 0 |
| Gilas | 96,646 | 0.24 | 0 | 0 |
| Bunyog Party | 93,825 | 0.24 | 0 | 0 |
| Vendors Partylist | 88,845 | 0.22 | 0 | 0 |
| Bayaning Tsuper | 84,204 | 0.21 | 0 | 0 |
| Bisaya Gyud Party-List | 79,915 | 0.20 | 0 | 0 |
| Magdalo Party-List | 78,984 | 0.20 | 0 | 0 |
| Maharlikang Pilipino Party | 78,700 | 0.20 | 0 | 0 |
| Arangkada Pilipino | 75,493 | 0.19 | 0 | 0 |
| Bagong Maunlad na Pilipinas | 70,595 | 0.18 | 0 | 0 |
| Damayang Filipino | 68,480 | 0.17 | 0 | 0 |
| Partido sa Bagong Pilipino | 68,085 | 0.17 | 0 | 0 |
| Heal PH | 67,085 | 0.17 | 0 | 0 |
| Ang Tinig ng Seniors | 66,553 | 0.17 | 0 | 0 |
| Ako OFW | 60,230 | 0.15 | 0 | 0 |
| Aksyon Dapat | 58,916 | 0.15 | 0 | 0 |
| Aktibong Kaagapay | 55,829 | 0.14 | 0 | 0 |
| UGB Partylist | 53,633 | 0.14 | 0 | 0 |
| Ang Komadrona | 53,017 | 0.13 | 0 | 0 |
| United Frontliners | 52,338 | 0.13 | 0 | 0 |
| Gabay | 52,109 | 0.13 | 0 | 0 |
| Tictok | 51,354 | 0.13 | 0 | 0 |
| Ako Tanod | 49,553 | 0.13 | 0 | 0 |
| Barangay Natin | 49,364 | 0.12 | 0 | 0 |
| Abante Bisdak | 49,114 | 0.12 | 0 | 0 |
| Turismo | 47,645 | 0.12 | 0 | 0 |
| Ang Bumbero ng Pilipinas | 47,027 | 0.12 | 0 | 0 |
| BFF | 45,816 | 0.12 | 0 | 0 |
| Pinoy Ako | 44,419 | 0.11 | 0 | 0 |
| Patrol Partylist | 41,570 | 0.10 | 0 | −1 |
| Tutok To Win Party-List | 41,036 | 0.10 | 0 | −1 |
| Lingap | 38,564 | 0.10 | 0 | 0 |
| Maagap | 35,871 | 0.09 | 0 | 0 |
| PBA Partylist | 35,078 | 0.09 | 0 | −1 |
| Ilocano Defenders | 32,028 | 0.08 | 0 | 0 |
| Pamana | 31,526 | 0.08 | 0 | 0 |
| Kaunlad Pinoy | 30,898 | 0.08 | 0 | 0 |
| Juan Pinoy | 27,523 | 0.07 | 0 | 0 |
| Rebolusyonaryong Alyansang Makabansa | 26,771 | 0.07 | 0 | 0 |
| Arise | 26,565 | 0.07 | 0 | 0 |
| Click Party | 25,914 | 0.07 | 0 | 0 |
| MPBL Partylist | 23,189 | 0.06 | 0 | 0 |
| PROMDI | 23,144 | 0.06 | 0 | 0 |
| Bida Katagumpay | 20,885 | 0.05 | 0 | 0 |
| Hugpong Federal | 19,028 | 0.05 | 0 | 0 |
| Arte | 14,169 | 0.04 | 0 | 0 |
| Peoples Champ Guardians Partylist | 11,492 | 0.03 | 0 | 0 |
| Sulong Dignidad | 8,120 | 0.02 | 0 | 0 |
| Total | 39,611,775 | 100.00 | 64 | +1 |
| Valid votes | 39,611,775 | 69.07 | +3.62 | |
| Invalid/blank votes (Note: Includes 2,338,564 votes for Duterte Youth, which the Commission on Elections (COMELEC) second division cancelled its registration on June 18, 2025, which was later affirmed by the COMELEC en banc, thereby preventing all of its nominees from assuming their seats. The COMELEC then proclaimed three party-lists with one seat each as winners.) | 17,739,183 | 30.93 | −3.62 | |
| Total votes | 57,350,958 | 100.00 | – | |
| Registered voters/turnout | 69,673,655 | 82.31 | −0.67 | |
Source: COMELEC (vote totals)

== See also ==
- Electoral calendar
- Electoral system
