= Politics of Manila =

The politics of Manila are governed by a three-branch system of government, with a leader who is directly elected by the residents of the city of Manila. The mayor is elected between three-year terms and has a limit of three consecutive terms in service. The city council includes six districts, each having six seats, making a total of thirty-six seats. Elections are held every three years, including the mayor, vice-mayor, councilors, and other positions.

The mayors of Manila formerly held the Prime Minister of the Philippines title, created during the 1899 Constitution of the Philippines, the title was abolished during the 1987 Philippine constitutional plebiscite.

== Executive ==
Executive power is given to the mayor, making him the head of the state and government of Manila, the mayor is elected every three years, with the limit being three consecutive terms. The mayor is elected with the First-past-the-post system. The vice-mayor is separately voted from the mayor.

During the case when a mayor dies, the vice mayor will take the role of the mayor until the next election.

=== Prime minister title ===
The prime minister title was first created in 1899, during the Constitution of the Philippines, the office was first taken by Apolinario Mabini. The office closed during the capture of Emilio Aguinaldo and the establishment of the Commonwealth.

The title opened again during the term of President Ferdinand Marcos after issuing presidential decrees 991 and 1033 in October 1976, which was soon abolished by the People Power Revolution and the 1987 Philippine constitutional plebiscite.

The prime minister has the powers to:

- Appoint cabinet members;
- Appoint the Deputy Prime Minister that will have powers vested by the Prime Minister;
- Present the program and state of the government to the National Assembly at the start of each regular session;
- Control all ministries provided by the law;
- Head the Armed Forces of the Philippines as their commander-in-chief;
- Appoint the heads of government bureaus and offices, and promote brigadier-generals and commodores of the Armed Forces;
- Grant reprieves, commutations, and pardons; remit fines and forfeitures after final conviction; and grant amnesties with the permission of the National Assembly, except at the time of impeachment; and
- Guarantee foreign and local loans of the Republic.

== Legislature ==
There are 38 seats in the City Council of Manila, 36 of the seats comes from six districts, whom each have their own six representatives, and two barangay chairmen. The city council is responsible for creating and passing bills regarding the City of Manila. The bills passed by the city council can be vetoed by the mayor, but the council can override the veto with a two-thirds majority. The seat for the city council is the Danilo B. Lacuna Sr. Hall inside the Manila City Hall.

Other than the City Council, there are six congressional districts in Manila, each with their own representatives.

== Elections ==
Since 1935, the elections are held by the Commission on Elections (COMELEC). The elected officials are the mayor, vice-mayor, the council, and the local officials. Every position has a three-year period (excluding the barangay officials, whose term lasts for 1-3 year(s)). All terms start and end on June 30 of every election year.

The mayor and vice mayor are elected with the First-past-the-post voting system, while the councilors are elected via the Plurality voting system, ignoring the voting systems, all the elections use the multi-party system.

== Local government ==
Manila City Council
Vice Mayor of Manila
Barangay Kagawad
Barangay Captains
Mayor of Manila
Representatives

The barangays in Manila have each a barangay captain and several barangay councilors, there is also an SK Chairperson for each barangay.

== History ==
=== The Philippine revolution (1899-1901) ===
The 1899 Constitution of the Philippines created the Prime Minister of the Philippines.
