= 1895 Philippine municipal elections =

1895 Philippine municipal election
1895	1899 →

The first Philippine municipal elections were held in 1895.

In 1893, the Maura Law was passed to reorganize town governments, with the aim of making them more effective and autonomous. The law changed the title of the chief local authority from gobernadorcillo to capitan municipal. Under the Maura Law, Luzon and Visayas were divided into provinces, each administered by a governor assisted by the provincial council (junta provincial). Provinces were divided into towns (pueblos), managed by the municipal councils with the aid of principales. The towns were in turn subdivided into wards (barrios), headed by tenientes del barrio, and barangays, under cabezas de barangay. Fully implemented in 1895, the Maura Law was a major Spanish reform in Philippine local government in its time, giving the Filipinos greater participation in the administration of their affairs.
