= Voter registration in the Philippines =

Voter registration in the Philippines is the process of filing an application to have a voter's record at the Commission on Election in a specific date and designated places set by the Comelec.

Any Filipino citizen who is at least 18 years of age, a resident of the Philippines for at least one year, and in the place where they intend to vote for at least six months immediately preceding the election can file application for registration. There are two types of voter registration: Computerized Voter's List (CVL) electronic process and the Voters Registration Record (VRR) manual one.

== Qualifications for registration ==
You may register in the country if you have complied with the following requirements:

1. You must be a citizen of the Republic of the Philippines.
2. You are a resident of the place where you intend to register for at least six months.
3. You must be at least 18 years of age on or before the election date
4. You have not been adjudged as mentally incapable by a court or by competent authority.
5. You are adjudicated as free from committing any disloyalty liaising against the government, such as rebellion or sedition.

== Registration process ==
To become a registered voter, you must personally submit all the required documents. You must yield to your Election officer a fully accomplished Registration form (CEF-1A) which you can get either from the Office of Election Officer (OEO) or downloaded from the commission website. Along with your form, you must also present a photocopy of any valid ID which is inclusive of your photo, autograph and home address. None of the three qualifications must be deficient.

Wait until all your documents are verified by the assigned election officer. After all your documents are authenticated, you can proceed to the next step, which is the taking of your biometrics, which includes your signature, thumbmark and picture.

The last step is for you to get your acknowledgment receipt which you can present upon getting your Voter's ID.

Registration is open every Monday to Friday (including holidays) from 8am to 5pm.

Take note that it may take up to 3 years before getting your Voter's ID.

== Valid ID qualification deficiency ==
An ID which is deficient of any of the given qualifications must get either a National Bureau of Investigation (NBI) Clearance from any NBI Branch. Individuals without a potential ID may be identified under oath by any registered voter of the same voting precinct or by a relative, who must also be an authorized voter.

== Double registration ==
There are cases when an individual transfers residence then fails to file an application for cancellation or transfer. This is an electoral case called double/multiple registration, which also called as flying voter. Whether it is deliberate or not, the individual who is found guilty shall be punishable with imprisonment of one to six years.

== Naturalized citizens ==
Naturalized Filipino Citizens may vote during elections. However, there are several positions in the government that they cannot hold since they are not natural-born citizens.

== Overseas Filipinos ==
Overseas Absentee Voting Act R.A. 9189 states that all Filipino citizens abroad who are not disqualified by law and at least 18 years old by the time of elections will be entitled to vote. The eligible individuals are required to file their applications personally at the Philippine embassy or consulate nearest their region. They are also required to be holders of a valid Philippine passport with an accomplished overseas absentee voting (OAV) registration form from the commission on elections. For seafarers a photocopy of their seaman's book is required. Lastly if the individual availed the citizen retention and reacquisition act (R.A. 9225), they would need to submit their order of approval application for the said act.
