= Cabeza de barangay =

Hereditary office in the Philippines during Spanish rule

A cabeza de barangay ("barangay head"), also known as teniente del barrio ("holder of the barrio"), was the head of a barangay or barrio political unit in the Philippines during Spanish rule. The office was inherited from the Malayan aristocratic rank of datu (i.e., lord) after barangays had become tributaries of the Kingdom of the Spains and the Indies. Philip II of Spain decreed that the nobility in the Philippine islands should retain the honours and privileges they had before their conversion to Christianity and subjugation to Spanish rule. (Note: In a decree on 11 June 1594, Philip II ordered that the honour and privilege to rule by Filipino nobles should be retained and protected. He also ordered the Spanish governors in the islands to provide the nobles good treatment, and ordered the Filipinos to pay respect and tribute due to the nobles as they did before conversion to Christianity without prejudice to the things that pertain to king himself or to the entrusters or encomenderos. (Note: == Laws of the Indies == === Book 6 === ==== Title 7: On the caciques ==== ===== Law 16 ===== (Annotation: Law 16 that the princely Indians of the Philippines be treated well and be in charge of the government that they had instituted on others.) It is not fair that the princely Indians of the Philippines be of worse condition after having themselves converted; rather they should have such treatment that interests them and maintains them in trustworthiness, so that with the spiritual blessings that God has communicated to them by calling them to His true knowledge, the temporal blessings may be added, and they may live with pleasure and convenience. By that, we mandate to the governors of those islands that they give them good treatment and entrust them in our name the government of the Indians, of whom they were lords. In all else, the governors shall see that the princely ones are benefited justly, and the Indians shall pay them something as recognition, in the form that was in practice at the time of their heathenism, with which this be without prejudice to the taxes that are to be paid to us, nor prejudicial to that which pertains to their entrusters. Lord Philip II in Madrid on 11 of June of 1594.) Also v.)

== History ==
Under the form of government employed by the Kingdom of Spain, several existing neighboring barangays were combined to form a municipality and the cabezas de barangay participated in the governance of the new towns, forming part of the elite ruling class called the principalía. From among their ranks the head of the town, the gobernadorcillo or capitan municipal, were elected. Furthermore, only the members of their class could elect the gobernadorcillo.

The office of the cabeza de barangay was hereditary. The cabecería, i.e., headship of the barangays, was a more ancient institution of native nobilities that pre-dates the Spanish conquest and was doubtless hereditary. The increase of population during the Spanish regime consequently needed the creation of further cabecerías and election of new cabezas. The emergence of the mestizo culture (both Spanish mestizos and Chinese mestizos) had also necessitated this and even the subsequent creation of separate institutions or offices of gobernadorcillos for the different mestizo groups and for the natives living in the same territories or cities with large population. When the office of the cabeza de barangay fell vacant due to the lack of an heir or the resignation of the incumbent, a substitute was appointed by the superintendent if the barangay was near the capital of the province. In distant areas, the appointment was done by the respective delegate, based on the recommendation of the gobernadorcillo and other cabezas. The cabezas, their wives, and first-born sons were exempt from the payment of tribute to the Spanish Crown.

With the change of government (from monarchy to democracy) when the Americans took over the rule of the Philippines, the post became elective and anyone could become the head of the barangay, which came to be called a "barrio". The former cabezas de barangay and the rest of the members of the principalía and their descendants lost their traditional privileges and powers, but they remained as very influential elements in the political and economic life of a new democratic society.

Under the democratic rule, the head of the smallest unit of the Filipino society was no longer called cabeza de barangay. Furthermore, the barrio captains (or capitán del barrio as these local officials were then called), though exercising the same leadership function, no longer retained the aristocratic quality that was associated with this office during the pre-conquest and the colonial periods. Nor since the American rule has the office of the chief of the barangay been exclusive to the families belonging to the principalía, and is no longer hereditary.

From the presidency of Ferdinand Marcos onwards, the term "barangay" was re-adopted, but the Spanish title "cabeza de barangay" is not used. Instead, the term "barangay captain" in English, or punong barangay in Tagalog became the official designation to this leadership role.

== See also ==
- Filipino styles and honorifics
- Gobernadorcillo
