= Gobernadorcillo =

Type of Municipal Judge or small governor in the Philippines

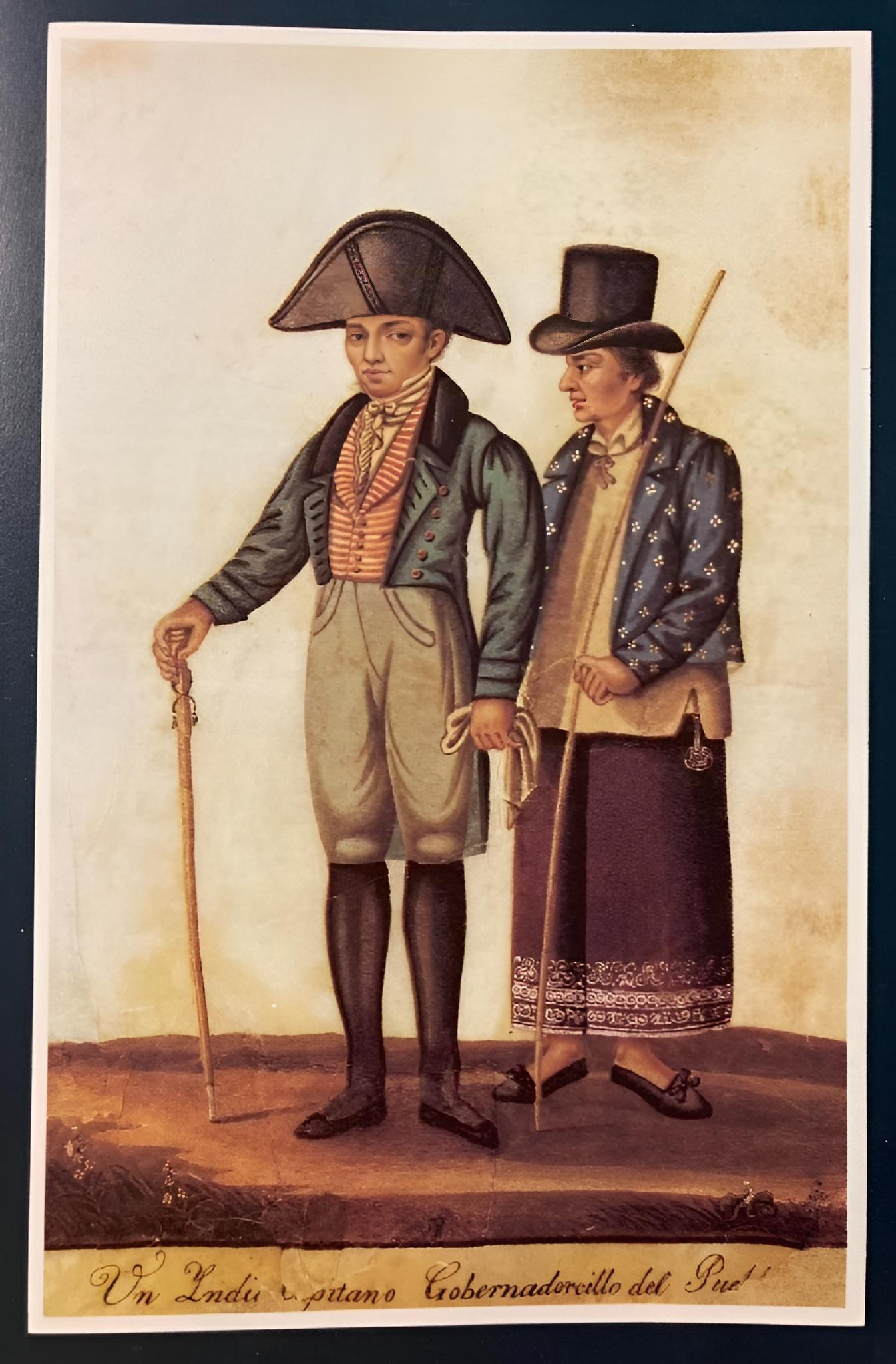
Gobernadorcillos circa 1833

The gobernadorcillo (locally [ɡoβeɾnaðoɾˈsiʎo], literally "little governor") was a municipal judge or governor in the Philippines during the Spanish colonial period, who carried out in a town the combined charges or responsibilities of leadership, economic, and judicial administration. The gobernadorcillo was the leader of a town or pueblo (people or population). In a coastal town, the gobernadorcillo functioned as a port captain. They were appointed through an exclusive nomination provided by the Spanish law. Their term of office lasted for two years.

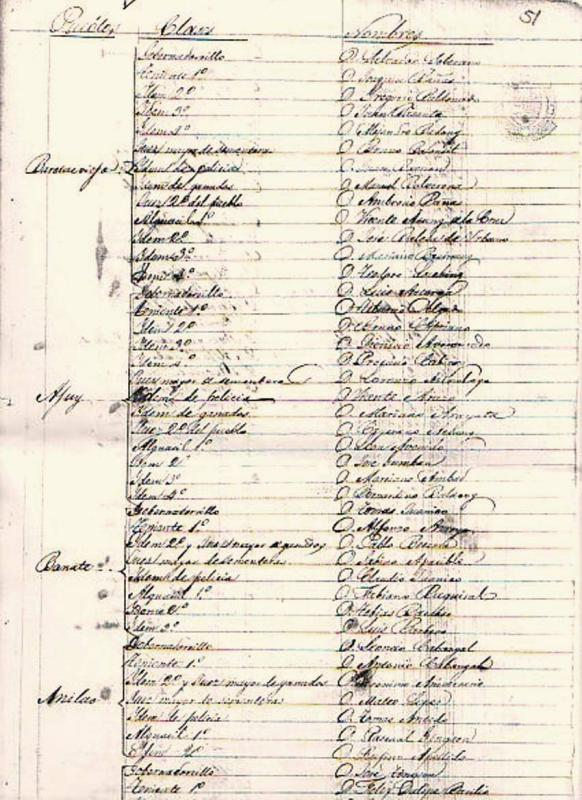
Extant record in the National Archives in Manila showing the 1855 election results in the province of Iloilo. This page shows the names of the gobernadorcillos elected by the principalía of Ajuy, Banate, and Barotac Viejo.

The position of a gobernadorcillo was honorary and mandatory in order to afford him those valid exemptions signified in the Philippine law. At the end of his biennial term he would enter and form part of the principalía, and was entitled to enjoy the honors and preeminence inherent to this state. This "mayor", who was at the same time "justice of the peace" and port captain, was directly responsible to the governor of the province in the exercise of his office.

In 1893, the Maura Law was passed with the aim of making the municipal governments in the Philippine Islands more effective and autonomous. One of the changes that this law brought about was the reorganization of certain structures of town governments, among which was the designation of town head's title, that is, gobernadorcillo, also as capitan municipal, effective 1895.

== System of election ==
The gobernadorcillo was elected from among the ranks of the principalía by twelve senior cabezas de barangay. He was the primus inter pares of the cabezas of a confederation of barangays that made up a municipality. The electors had to choose two candidates who were to compose a list, called "terna". It was a requirement that the respective place of each nominee in the terna be indicated.

The candidates must be able to speak, read, and write the Castilian language. If anyone was elected who did not possess these qualifications, the election would be considered null and void.

The same requirements were demanded in the election of officers of justice in the municipalities.

The election of a gobernadorcillo was by ballot. It was authorized by a notary and presided over by the provincial chief. The priest of the town may be present if he wishes, to express what opinions he may consider fitting, but for no other purpose. The sealed envelopes containing the election results in provinces near Manila were sent to superior offices of the government in the capital. From the terna, the governor-general appointed the gobernadorcillo, taking into consideration the report of the president of the election. In distant territories, the chief of each province appointed the nominee who got the highest vote.

== Honors accorded to gobernadorcillos ==
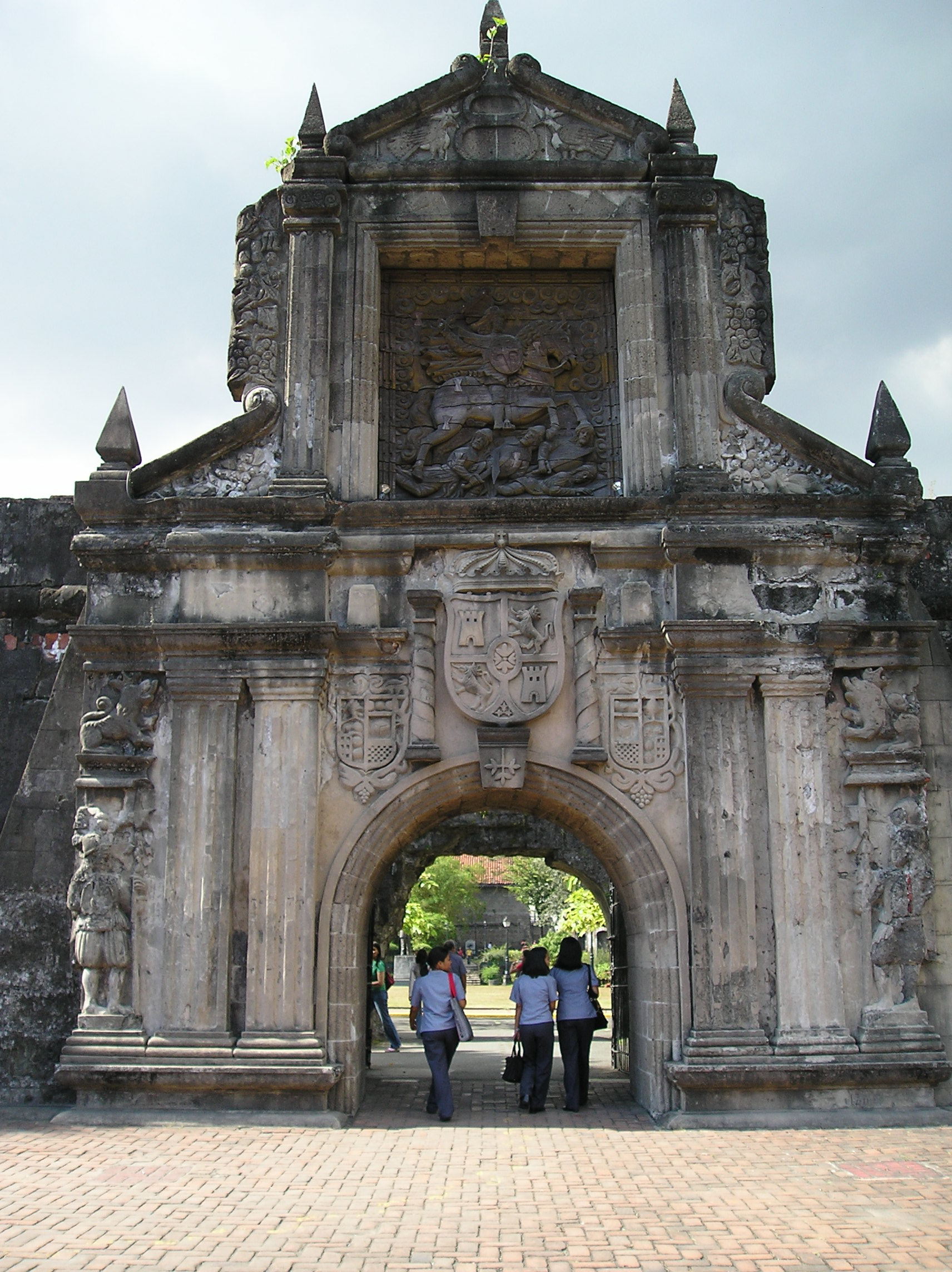
Abbreviated Spanish coat of arms at the entrance of Fort Santiago in Manila (reconstruction).

Among the local leaders in the Spanish Philippines, the gobernadorcillos and Filipino officials of justice received the greatest consideration from the Spanish crown officials. The colonial officials were under obligation to show them the honor corresponding to their respective duties. They were allowed to be seated in the houses of the Spanish provincial governors, and in any other places. They were not to be left standing. It was not permitted for Spanish parish priests to treat these Filipino nobles with less consideration.

On the day on which the gobernadorcillo would take on government duties, his town would hold a grand celebration. The festive banquet was offered in the municipal or city hall where he would occupy a seat, adorned by the coat of arms of Spain and with fanciful designs, if his social footing was of a respectable antiquity. (Note: The fanciful designs referred to by Blair and Robertson hint of the existence of some family symbols of the Datu Class, which existed before the Spanish conquest of the islands. Unfortunately, there has been no study of these symbols, which might be equivalent to what heraldry is in western countries.)

On holy days the town officials would go to the church, together in one group. The principalía and "cuadrilleros", police patrol or assistance, formed two lines in front of the gobernadorcillo. They were preceded by a band playing the music as they processed towards the church, where the gobernadorcillo occupied a seat in precedence among those of the chiefs or cabezas de barangay, who had benches of honor. After the mass, they would usually go to the parish rectory to pay their respects to the parish priest. Then, they would return to the tribunal (municipal hall or city hall) in the same order, and still accompanied by the band playing a loud double quick march called in Spanish a paso doble.

The gobernadorcillo was always accompanied by an alguacil or policia (police officer) whenever he went about the streets of his town.

== Duties ==
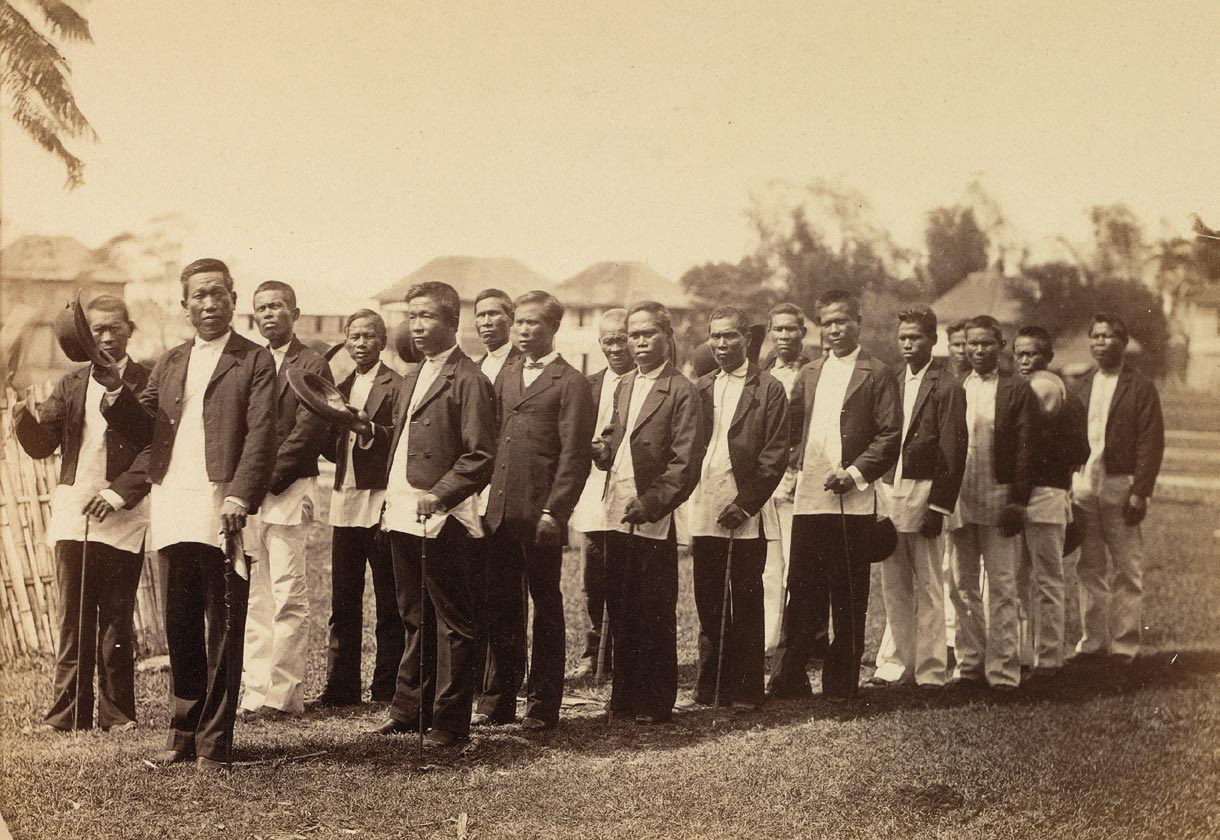
Principalía of Leganes, Iloilo c. 1880, in formal marching formation on a special occasion.

The gobernadorcillos exercised command of the towns. They were port captains in coastal towns. Their office corresponded to that of the alcaldes and municipal judges of the Iberian Peninsula. They simultaneously performed the functions of judges and even of notaries with defined powers. They also had the rights and powers to elect assistants and several lieutenants and alguaciles, proportionate in number to the inhabitants of the town.

== Responsibilities ==
- To give notice of ordinances for good government.
- build public infrastractures in his town and other public works.
- Collect some other taxes that are specified in their own credentials during their appointment in office.
- Hear and judge civil cases up to the value of two taels of gold, or forty pesos.
- They take action in criminal cases by collecting preliminary evidence, which they submit to the provincial chiefs.
- Aid the parish priest in issues pertaining to worship and the observance of religious doctrine.
- Oversee the collection of royal revenue.

== See also ==
- Filipino styles and honorifics
- Cabeza de Barangay
