= 1987 Philippine constitutional plebiscite =

- February 2, 1987
- Do you vote for the ratification of the proposed Constitution of the Republic of the Philippines with the ordinance appended thereto?
- Outcome: Constitution approved

Results
Choice	Votes	%
Yes	16,622,111	77.04%
No	4,953,375	22.96%
Valid votes	21,575,486	99.04%
Invalid or blank votes	209,730	0.96%
Total votes	21,785,216	100.00%
Registered voters/turnout		87.04%
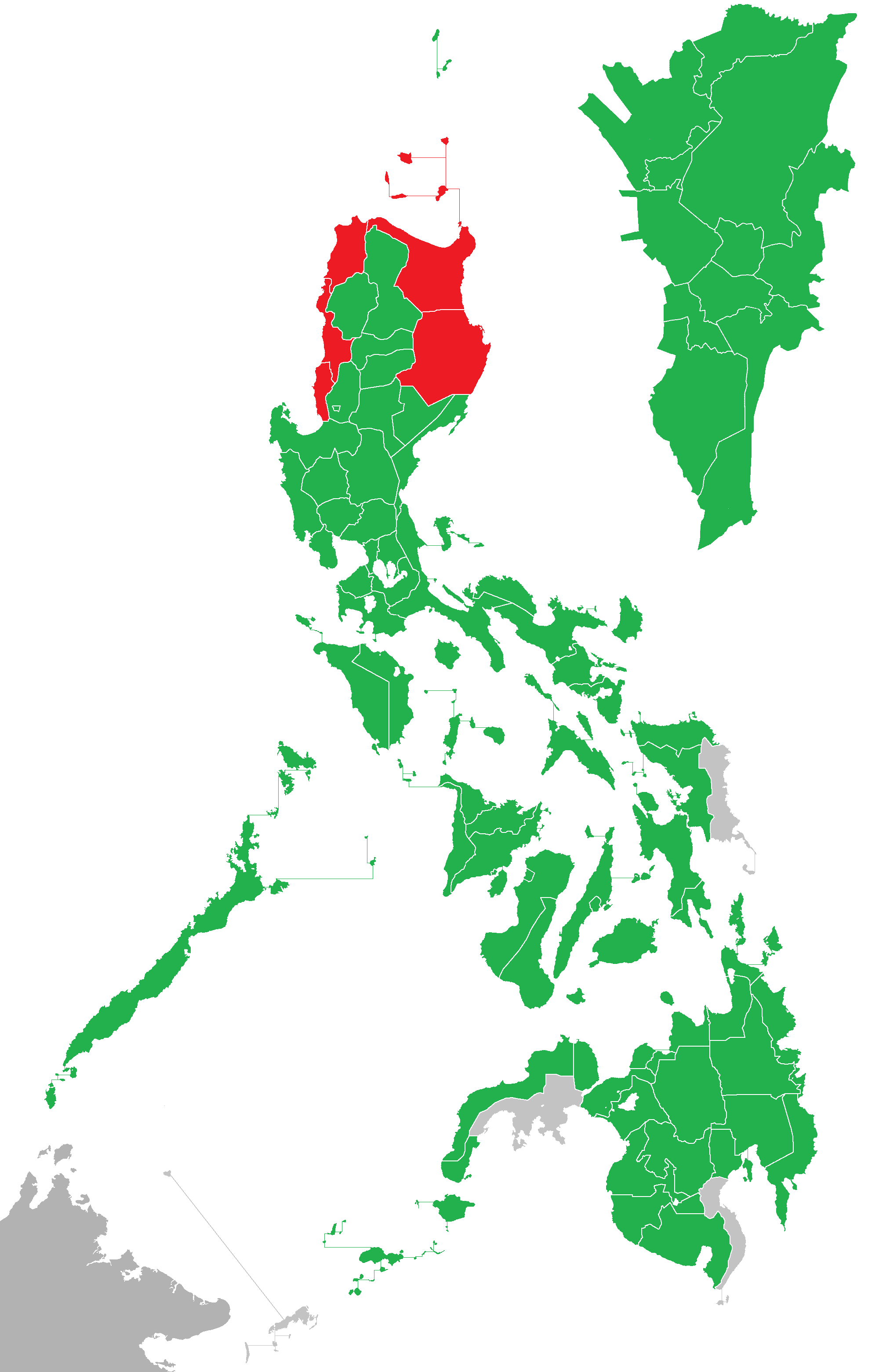

A constitutional plebiscite was held in the Philippines on February 2, 1987. The plebiscite is pursuant to Presidential Proclamation No. 3, which was issued on March 25, 1986, by President Corazon Aquino. It abolished the Office of the Prime Minister and the Regular Batasang Pambansa. Multi-party elections were held accordingly in 1987.

As of 2026, this remains the only constitutional plebiscite held in the present Fifth Republic.

== Background of the new constitution ==
In 1986, following the People Power Revolution which ousted Ferdinand Marcos as president, and following her own inauguration, Corazon Aquino issued Proclamation No. 3, declaring a national policy to implement the reforms mandated by the people, protecting their basic rights, adopting a provisional constitution, and providing for an orderly transition to a government under a new constitution.

President Aquino later issued Proclamation No. 9, creating a Constitutional Commission (popularly abbreviated as "ConCom" in the Philippines) to frame a new constitution to replace the 1973 Constitution, which took effect during the martial law regime of her predecessor. President Aquino appointed 50 members to the Commission. The members of the Commission were drawn from varied backgrounds, including several former senators and congressmen, a former Supreme Court Chief Justice (Roberto Concepcion), a Catholic bishop (Teodoro Bacani), and a noted film director (Lino Brocka). President Aquino also deliberately appointed five members associated with the Marcos administration, including former Labor Minister Blas Ople, who had been allied with President Marcos until the latter's ouster. After the Commission had convened, it elected as its president Cecilia Muñoz-Palma, who had emerged as a leading figure in the anti-Marcos opposition following her retirement as the first female Associate Justice of the Supreme Court.

The Commission finished the draft charter within four months after it was convened. Several issues were hotly debated during the sessions, including on the form of government to adopt, the abolition of the death penalty, the continued retention of the Clark and Subic American military bases, and the integration of economic policies into the Constitution. Brocka walked out of the Commission before its completion (formally resigning on August 28, 1986), and two other delegates dissented from the final draft. The ConCom completed their task on October 12, 1986 and presented the draft constitution to President Aquino on October 15, 1986. After a period of nationwide information campaign, a plebiscite for its ratification was held on February 2, 1987. More than three-fourths of all votes cast were for ratification. Thus, it was on February 2, 1987 that the 1987 Constitution took effect. On February 11, 1987, President Aquino, other government officials, and the Armed Forces of the Philippines, pledged allegiance to the Constitution. Since then, February 2 has been celebrated as Constitution Day, the date of the plebiscite.

== Results ==
Philippine constitutional plebiscite, 1987
Choice	Votes	%
For	16,622,111	77.04
Against	4,953,375	22.96
Total	21,575,486	100.00
Valid votes	21,575,486	99.04
Invalid/blank votes	209,730	0.96
Total votes	21,785,216	100.00
Registered voters/turnout		87.04

1987 Philippine constitutional plebiscite results (excluding invalid votes)
Yes; 16,622,111 (77%)	No; 4,953,375 (23%)
▲50%

=== By province/city ===
Province/City	Yes		No		Valid		Abstentions		Total
Province/City	Total	%	Total	%	Total	%	Total	%	Total
Abra	39,062	54.77%	32,264	45.23%	71,326	99.28%	519	0.72%	71,845
Agusan del Norte	69,977	85.01%	12,343	14.99%	82,320	98.64%	1,136	1.36%	83,456
Agusan del Sur	91,018	77.14%	26,976	22.86%	117,994	98.22%	2,139	1.78%	120,133
Aklan	121,116	88.78%	15,312	11.22%	136,428	99.38%	846	0.62%	137,274
Albay	239,354	90.30%	25,720	9.70%	265,074	99.09%	2,435	0.91%	267,509
Angeles	87,039	92.14%	7,421	7.86%	94,460	99.46%	510	0.54%	94,970
Antique	113,209	80.99%	26,579	19.01%	139,788	98.93%	1,507	1.07%	141,295
Aurora	34,685	76.30%	10,774	23.70%	45,459	98.88%	517	1.12%	45,976
Bacolod	128,851	91.11%	12,573	8.89%	141,424	99.21%	1,128	0.79%	142,552
Bago	35,182	87.90%	4,841	12.10%	40,023	99.26%	297	0.74%	40,320
Baguio	39,536	50.36%	38,966	49.64%	78,502	99.00%	791	1.00%	79,293
Bais	16,767	74.06%	5,874	25.94%	22,641	99.15%	194	0.85%	22,835
Basilan	56,231	86.75%	8,586	13.25%	64,817	98.96%	679	1.04%	65,496
Bataan	132,632	81.06%	30,998	18.94%	163,630	99.89%	176	0.11%	163,806
Batanes	5,634	91.36%	533	8.64%	6,167	99.76%	15	0.24%	6,182
Batangas	358,654	87.48%	51,317	12.52%	409,971	99.54%	1,902	0.46%	411,873
Batangas City	66,350	92.90%	5,071	7.10%	71,421	99.47%	377	0.53%	71,798
Benguet	72,049	72.96%	26,709	27.04%	98,758	98.95%	1,052	1.05%	99,810
Bohol	276,221	81.41%	63,088	18.59%	339,309	99.20%	2,743	0.80%	342,052
Bukidnon	198,995	71.91%	77,719	28.09%	276,714	98.48%	4,262	1.52%	280,976
Bulacan	465,162	82.19%	100,805	17.81%	565,967	99.41%	3,368	0.59%	569,335
Butuan	66,130	80.69%	15,827	19.31%	81,957	98.62%	1,146	1.38%	83,103
Cabanatuan	45,179	69.12%	20,180	30.88%	65,359	99.25%	492	0.75%	65,851
Cadiz	24,072	74.20%	8,370	25.80%	32,442	98.62%	454	1.38%	32,896
Cagayan	91,897	32.63%	189,753	67.37%	281,650	98.94%	3,025	1.06%	284,675
Cagayan de Oro	105,397	77.37%	30,825	22.63%	136,222	99.32%	933	0.68%	137,155
Calbayog	27,318	63.30%	15,836	36.70%	43,154	98.83%	510	1.17%	43,664
Caloocan	221,591	76.74%	67,174	23.26%	288,765	99.28%	2,083	0.72%	290,848
Camarines Norte	93,416	87.30%	13,590	12.70%	107,006	99.04%	1,036	0.96%	108,042
Camarines Sur	312,854	87.72%	43,794	12.28%	356,648	99.03%	3,497	0.97%	360,145
Camiguin	21,457	84.16%	4,038	15.84%	25,495	99.42%	149	0.58%	25,644
Canlaon	9,455	76.82%	2,853	23.18%	12,308	98.58%	177	1.42%	12,485
Capiz	131,774	83.22%	26,579	16.78%	158,353	99.06%	1,507	0.94%	159,860
Catanduanes	58,698	91.13%	5,716	8.87%	64,414	99.27%	473	0.73%	64,887
Cavite	310,642	82.01%	68,127	17.99%	378,769	99.41%	2,266	0.59%	381,035
Cavite City	26,417	55.48%	21,199	44.52%	47,616	98.95%	503	1.05%	48,119
Cebu	470,375	86.30%	74,665	13.70%	545,040	99.02%	5,407	0.98%	550,447
Cebu City	251,078	86.79%	38,221	13.21%	289,299	99.29%	2,063	0.71%	291,362
Cotabato City	27,008	80.58%	6,508	19.42%	33,516	96.15%	1,342	3.85%	34,858
Dagupan	35,097	73.44%	12,692	26.56%	47,789	99.28%	348	0.72%	48,137
Danao	15,802	53.67%	13,641	46.33%	29,443	98.77%	367	1.23%	29,810
Dapitan	20,759	87.22%	3,043	12.78%	23,802	99.25%	179	0.75%	23,981
Davao City	247,527	78.02%	69,753	21.98%	317,280	98.60%	4,521	1.40%	321,801
Davao del Norte	299,713	82.67%	62,819	17.33%	362,532	98.30%	6,277	1.70%	368,809
Davao del Sur	147,692	77.56%	42,733	22.44%	190,425	98.12%	3,643	1.88%	194,068
Davao Oriental	79,795	75.40%	26,033	24.60%	105,828	98.34%	1,782	1.66%	107,610
Dipolog	27,549	83.84%	5,310	16.16%	32,859	99.68%	107	0.32%	32,966
Dumaguete	32,811	90.57%	3,417	9.43%	36,228	99.18%	299	0.82%	36,527
Eastern Samar	—		—		—		—		—
General Santos	59,206	79.12%	15,628	20.88%	74,834	98.80%	907	1.20%	75,741
Gingoog	28,092	81.25%	6,483	18.75%	34,575	98.68%	461	1.32%	35,036
Ifugao	25,826	70.76%	10,670	29.24%	36,496	98.72%	475	1.28%	36,971
Iligan	69,758	80.86%	16,516	19.14%	86,274	98.85%	1,006	1.15%	87,280
Ilocos Norte	23,367	14.65%	136,087	85.35%	159,454	99.47%	850	0.53%	160,304
Ilocos Sur	66,388	32.12%	140,294	67.88%	206,682	99.36%	1,338	0.64%	208,020
Iloilo	448,625	88.77%	56,775	11.23%	505,400	99.32%	3,447	0.68%	508,847
Iloilo City	118,252	88.27%	15,709	11.73%	133,961	99.50%	671	0.50%	134,632
Iriga	21,617	82.17%	4,690	17.83%	26,307	99.36%	170	0.64%	26,477
Isabela	173,623	46.93%	196,364	53.07%	369,987	98.96%	3,900	1.04%	373,887
Kalinga-Apayao	33,972	58.68%	23,918	41.32%	57,890	99.22%	453	0.78%	58,343
La Carlota	19,341	89.31%	2,316	10.69%	21,657	99.35%	142	0.65%	21,799
La Union	74,267	33.12%	149,961	66.88%	224,228	98.94%	2,400	1.06%	226,628
Laguna	358,708	81.50%	81,430	18.50%	440,138	99.47%	2,339	0.53%	442,477
Lanao del Norte	91,402	74.30%	31,614	25.70%	123,016	98.75%	1,554	1.25%	124,570
Lanao del Sur	120,245	81.55%	27,196	18.45%	147,441	97.88%	3,186	2.12%	150,627
Laoag	4,425	11.58%	33,787	88.42%	38,212	99.52%	183	0.48%	38,395
Lapu-Lapu	42,375	84.12%	7,997	15.88%	50,372	99.04%	487	0.96%	50,859
Las Piñas	93,109	80.08%	23,157	19.92%	116,266	99.50%	584	0.50%	116,850
Legazpi	42,258	87.60%	5,981	12.40%	48,239	99.27%	355	0.73%	48,594
Leyte	328,176	72.56%	124,111	27.44%	452,287	98.85%	5,284	1.15%	457,571
Lipa	52,706	90.74%	5,379	9.26%	58,085	100.00%	0	0.00%	58,085
Lucena	47,370	87.48%	6,778	12.52%	54,148	99.56%	237	0.44%	54,385
Maguindanao	118,856	81.22%	27,486	18.78%	146,342	88.11%	19,756	11.89%	166,098
Makati	184,759	73.08%	68,044	26.92%	252,803	99.44%	1,419	0.56%	254,222
Malabon	94,234	80.44%	22,914	19.56%	117,148	99.31%	809	0.69%	117,957
Mandaluyong	105,881	86.70%	16,238	13.30%	122,119	99.58%	510	0.42%	122,629
Mandaue	67,552	91.49%	6,280	8.51%	73,832	99.58%	311	0.42%	74,143
Manila	694,802	75.94%	220,190	24.06%	914,992	99.38%	5,671	0.62%	920,663
Marawi	18,896	85.26%	3,268	14.74%	22,164	98.98%	229	1.02%	22,393
Marikina	116,005	82.75%	24,184	17.25%	140,189	99.43%	802	0.57%	140,991
Marinduque	65,341	89.83%	7,398	10.17%	72,739	99.42%	424	0.58%	73,163
Masbate	160,412	80.26%	39,461	19.74%	199,873	98.86%	2,309	1.14%	202,182
Misamis Occidental	71,199	71.61%	28,231	28.39%	99,430	98.79%	1,213	1.21%	100,643
Misamis Oriental	121,485	74.23%	42,176	25.77%	163,661	98.91%	1,802	1.09%	165,463
Mountain Province	26,651	84.15%	5,020	15.85%	31,671	98.14%	600	1.86%	32,271
Muntinlupa	83,729	80.98%	19,664	19.02%	103,393	99.11%	931	0.89%	104,324
Naga	38,901	91.04%	3,827	8.96%	42,728	99.43%	244	0.57%	42,972
Navotas	58,318	79.80%	14,766	20.20%	73,084	98.77%	913	1.23%	73,997
Negros Occidental	377,285	84.42%	69,638	15.58%	446,923	99.00%	4,510	1.00%	451,433
Negros Oriental	211,065	82.11%	46,002	17.89%	257,067	99.09%	2,357	0.91%	259,424
Cotabato	143,279	69.63%	62,502	30.37%	205,781	97.72%	4,802	2.28%	210,583
Northern Samar	96,787	74.47%	33,179	25.53%	129,966	99.15%	1,118	0.85%	131,084
Nueva Ecija	263,886	71.04%	107,552	28.96%	371,438	99.35%	2,424	0.65%	373,862
Nueva Vizcaya	67,012	60.99%	42,866	39.01%	109,878	99.39%	679	0.61%	110,557
Occidental Mindoro	61,125	72.02%	23,752	27.98%	84,877	99.40%	513	0.60%	85,390
Olongapo	60,184	61.21%	38,136	38.79%	98,320	99.45%	543	0.55%	98,863
Oriental Mindoro	145,527	84.51%	26,673	15.49%	172,200	99.68%	561	0.32%	172,761
Ormoc	43,236	86.74%	6,607	13.26%	49,843	99.12%	440	0.88%	50,283
Oroquieta	15,929	69.86%	6,871	30.14%	22,800	98.65%	312	1.35%	23,112
Ozamiz	32,815	81.13%	7,630	18.87%	40,445	98.83%	480	1.17%	40,925
Pagadian	—		—		—		—		—
Palawan	86,786	81.84%	19,254	18.16%	106,040	99.22%	837	0.78%	106,877
Palayan	5,228	72.82%	1,951	27.18%	7,179	98.64%	99	1.36%	7,278
Pampanga	419,155	94.44%	24,695	5.56%	443,850	99.44%	2,482	0.56%	446,332
Pangasinan	370,786	58.24%	265,907	41.76%	636,693	99.26%	4,716	0.74%	641,409
Parañaque	129,136	82.13%	28,091	17.87%	157,227	99.53%	743	0.47%	157,970
Pasay	134,056	73.37%	48,668	26.63%	182,724	99.38%	1,133	0.62%	183,857
Pasig	135,129	81.32%	31,032	18.68%	166,161	99.46%	902	0.54%	167,063
Pateros	17,752	82.14%	3,860	17.86%	21,612	99.19%	176	0.81%	21,788
Puerto Princesa City	24,744	74.30%	8,559	25.70%	33,303	99.11%	300	0.89%	33,603
Quezon	347,273	86.75%	53,030	13.25%	400,303	99.24%	3,071	0.76%	403,374
Quezon City	610,614	76.71%	185,364	23.29%	795,978	99.32%	5,447	0.68%	801,425
Quirino	25,478	58.81%	17,842	41.19%	43,320	99.06%	410	0.94%	43,730
Rizal	279,317	77.02%	83,342	22.98%	362,659	99.31%	2,533	0.69%	365,192
Romblon	61,188	87.29%	8,911	12.71%	70,099	99.30%	495	0.70%	70,594
Roxas	34,502	86.58%	5,346	13.42%	39,848	99.00%	404	1.00%	40,252
Samar	99,123	67.66%	47,386	32.34%	146,509	98.71%	1,916	1.29%	148,425
San Carlos, Negros Occidental	25,752	80.37%	6,291	19.63%	32,043	99.12%	283	0.88%	32,326
San Carlos, Pangasinan	30,782	79.64%	7,868	20.36%	38,650	99.63%	143	0.37%	38,793
San Jose	19,246	56.56%	14,781	43.44%	34,027	99.18%	280	0.82%	34,307
San Juan	49,746	62.52%	29,823	37.48%	79,569	99.06%	757	0.94%	80,326
San Pablo	58,757	84.65%	10,655	15.35%	69,412	99.46%	378	0.54%	69,790
Silay	33,586	93.36%	2,390	6.64%	35,976	98.69%	476	1.31%	36,452
Siquijor	24,014	73.01%	8,879	26.99%	32,893	99.49%	169	0.51%	33,062
Sorsogon	148,612	80.90%	35,082	19.10%	183,694	99.18%	1,525	0.82%	185,219
South Cotabato	184,020	74.66%	62,464	25.34%	246,484	98.59%	3,520	1.41%	250,004
Southern Leyte	98,356	77.74%	28,170	22.26%	126,526	99.12%	1,124	0.88%	127,650
Sultan Kudarat	74,919	69.77%	32,467	30.23%	107,386	98.57%	1,554	1.43%	108,940
Sulu	144,703	95.34%	7,080	4.66%	151,783	98.56%	2,223	1.44%	154,006
Surigao City	33,866	90.58%	3,522	9.42%	37,388	99.01%	374	0.99%	37,762
Surigao del Norte	98,478	85.94%	16,117	14.06%	114,595	99.12%	1,018	0.88%	115,613
Surigao del Sur	143,556	88.10%	19,396	11.90%	162,952	98.38%	2,691	1.62%	165,643
Tacloban	37,697	71.87%	14,756	28.13%	52,453	99.43%	302	0.57%	52,755
Tagaytay	7,327	74.32%	2,532	25.68%	9,859	99.02%	98	0.98%	9,957
Tagbilaran	20,449	81.56%	4,623	18.44%	25,072	99.21%	200	0.79%	25,272
Taguig	69,731	77.60%	20,125	22.40%	89,856	99.34%	598	0.66%	90,454
Tangub	16,123	92.70%	1,270	7.30%	17,393	99.14%	151	0.86%	17,544
Tarlac	278,337	89.04%	34,248	10.96%	312,585	99.22%	2,442	0.78%	315,027
Tawi-Tawi	—		—		—		—		—
Toledo	35,994	85.59%	6,058	14.41%	42,052	98.54%	623	1.46%	42,675
Trece Martires	4,508	84.58%	822	15.42%	5,330	98.18%	99	1.82%	5,429
Valenzuela	118,512	81.94%	26,113	18.06%	144,625	99.26%	1,079	0.74%	145,704
Zambales	94,406	65.92%	48,803	34.08%	143,209	99.32%	974	0.68%	144,183
Zamboanga City	116,248	81.61%	26,199	18.39%	142,447	99.13%	1,255	0.87%	143,702
Zamboanga del Norte	136,637	82.55%	28,879	17.45%	165,516	98.79%	2,025	1.21%	167,541
Zamboanga del Sur	—		—		—		—		—
Total	16,622,111	77.04%	4,953,375	22.96%	21,575,327	99.03%	210,315	0.97%	21,785,642
Source: Office of the President

The votes from Davao del Sur, Eastern Samar, Pagadian, Tawi-Tawi, and Zamboanga del Sur, were not included in the final tally as their results came in late. Votes in these places, except for Tawi-Tawi, were 437,387 for, 105,338 against, and 10,505 abstentions.

== See also ==
- Commission on Elections
- Politics of the Philippines
- Philippine elections
- Philippine Constitution
