= Maura Law =

Maura Law may refer to two different decrees named after Don Antonio Maura, the Spanish minister of colonies at the time.

The first decree, the royal decree of May 19, 1893, was a law that laid the basic foundations for municipal government in the Philippines. It was put into effect starting in 1895. The Maura Law established tribunales, municipales and juntas provinciales. These foundations laid by the Maura Law were later adopted, revised, and strengthened by the American and Filipino governments that succeeded Spanish rule in the country.

The second decree, the royal decree of February 13, 1894, was known as the Maura Act and grew out of a proposal made in the 1820s by Manuel Bernaldez, a long-serving colonial official. To reduce controversy and litigation over land ownership, Bernaldez had called for Spain to require landowners to acquire official documentation of their land ownership. The Maura Act laid the basic foundations for municipal government in the Philippines, and was put into effect starting in 1895.

The preamble of the Maura Act declared that it would "insure to the natives, in the future, whenever it may be possible, the necessary land for cultivation, in accordance with traditional usages." However, it declared any titles issued after April 17, 1895, to have "no force and effect", established a one-year period for documentation of land title applications, with no extensions allowed, and with undocumented lands reverting to the state. Any claim to such lands by those who might have applied for adjustment of the same but have not done so at the above-mentioned date, will not avail themselves in any way nor at any time." Those who had pending applications for titles were given one year upon its publication in the Gaceta de Manila (e.g. Volume No. 106 on April 17, 1894) to secure their documentation. No extensions were made, and any paper titles issued after April 17, 1895, were deemed to have no force and effect.

== See also ==
- 1895 Philippine municipal elections
