= 1899 Philippine local elections =

- May 7, 1899

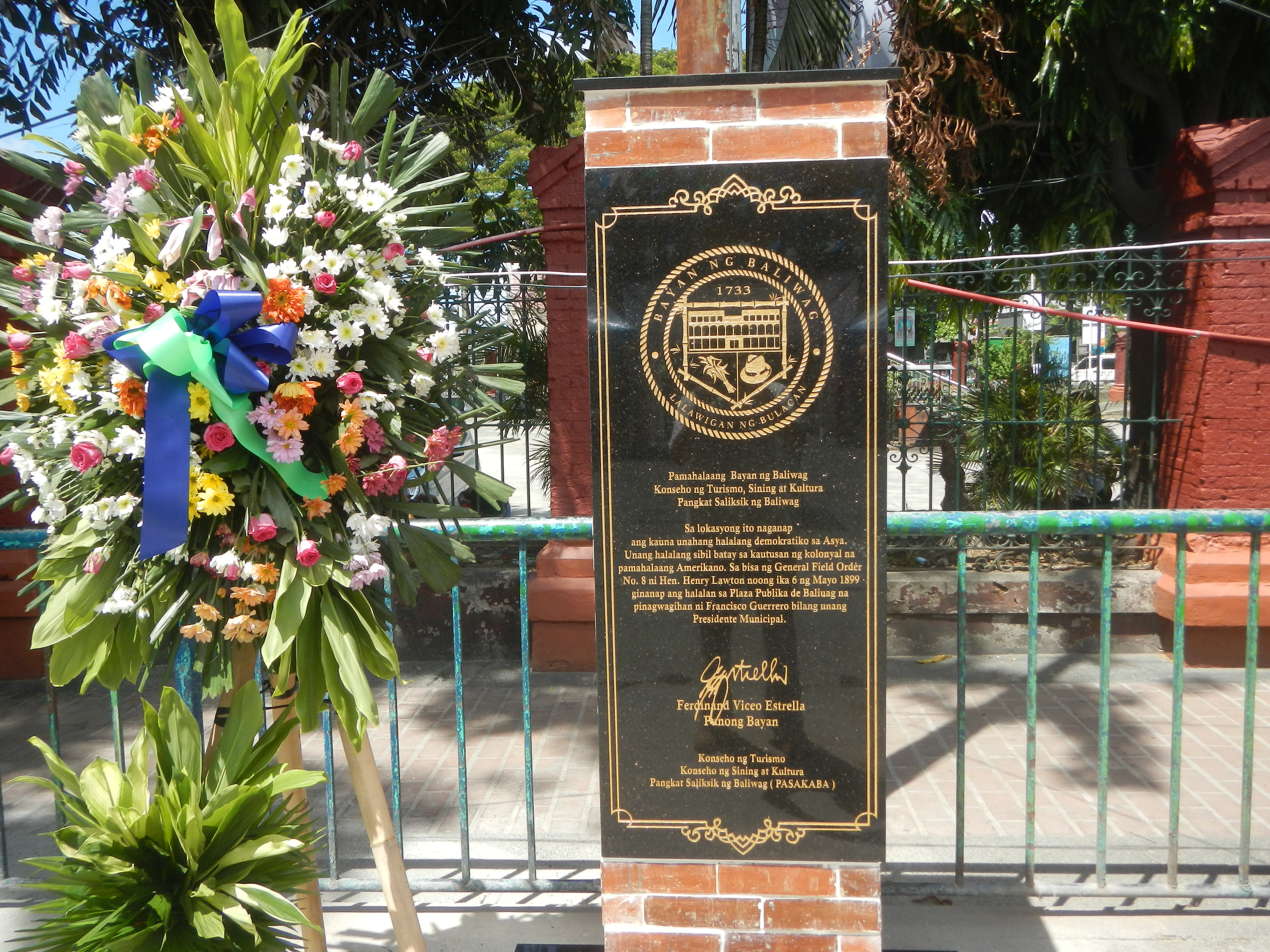
Plaza Baliwag historical marker

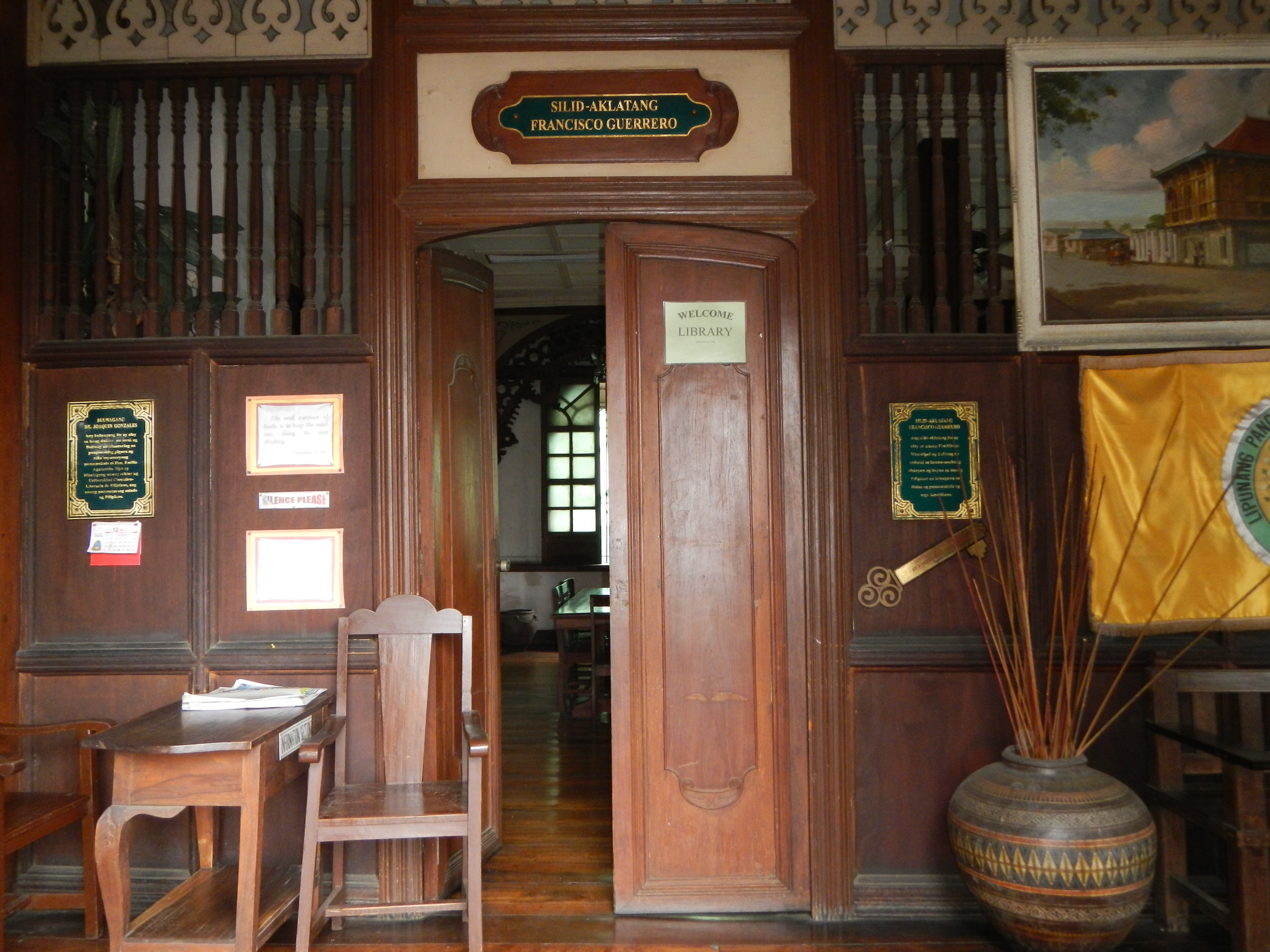
Bulwagang Francisco Guerrero

Local elections were held for provincial and municipal posts throughout the Philippine archipelago starting May 7, 1899. The first local elections under the American occupation were held in Baliuag, Bulacan, supervised by US General Henry W. Lawton (General Field Order No. 8). Francisco Guererro was elected the First Presidente Municipal.
