= List of presidents of the University of Iowa =

This is a list of individuals who have served as president of the University of Iowa.

== Table of presidents ==
The following persons served as president of the University of Iowa:

No.	Image	Name	Term start	Term end	Refs.
1		Amos Dean	1855	1859	
2		Silas Totten	1859	1862	
3		Oliver M. Spencer	1862	1867	
acting		Nathan Ransom Leonard	1867	1868	
4		James Black	1868	1870	
acting		Nathan Ransom Leonard	1870	1871	
5		George Thacher	1871	1877	
acting		Christian W. Slagle	1877	1878	
6		Josiah Little Pickard	1878	1887	
7		Charles Ashmead Schaeffer	1887	1898	
acting		Amos Noyes Currier	1898	1899	
8		George Edwin MacLean	1899	1911	
9		John Gabbert Bowman	1911	1914	
10		Thomas Huston Macbride	1914	1916	
11		Walter Albert Jessup	1916	1934	
12		Eugene Allen Gilmore	1934	1940	
acting		Chester Arthur Phillips	1940	1940	
13		Virgil Melvin Hancher	1940	1964	
14		Howard Rothmann Bowen	1964	1969	
15		Willard L. Boyd	1969	1981	
acting		Duane C. Spriestersbach	1981	1982	
16		James O. Freedman	1982	1987	
acting		Richard D. Remington	1987	1988	
17		Hunter R. Rawlings III	1988	1995	
acting		Peter E. Nathan	July 1, 1995	December 30, 1995	
18		Mary Sue Coleman (Note: Resigned to lead the University of Michigan.)	December 31, 1995	July 31, 2002	
interim		Willard L. Boyd	August 1, 2002	April 30, 2003	
19		David J. Skorton	March 1, 2003	June 30, 2006 (Note: Resigned to lead Cornell University.)	
interim		Gary Fethke	July 1, 2006	July 31, 2007	
20		Sally Mason	August 1, 2007	July 31, 2015	
interim		Jean Robillard	August 1, 2015	November 1, 2015	
21		Bruce Harreld	November 2, 2015	May 16, 2021	
interim		John Keller	May 17, 2021	July 14, 2021	
22		Barbara J. Wilson	July 15, 2021	present	

Table notes:
