= Schenella =

Scientific classification
- Kingdom: Fungi
- Division: Basidiomycota
- Class: Agaricomycetes
- Order: Geastrales
- Family: Geastraceae
- Genus: Schenella; T.Macbr.

Type species
- Schenella simplex T.Macbr.

Species
- Schenella microspora Schenella pityophila Schenella romana Schenella simplex

Synonyms
- Pyrenogaster Malençon & Riousset

Genus of fungi

Schenella is a genus of fungi in the family Geastraceae. The widely distributed genus contains four species. The genus was circumscribed by Thomas Huston Macbride in 1911. Pyrenogaster, described in 1977, is a later synonym.
