= Thelma Hunt =

American psychologist

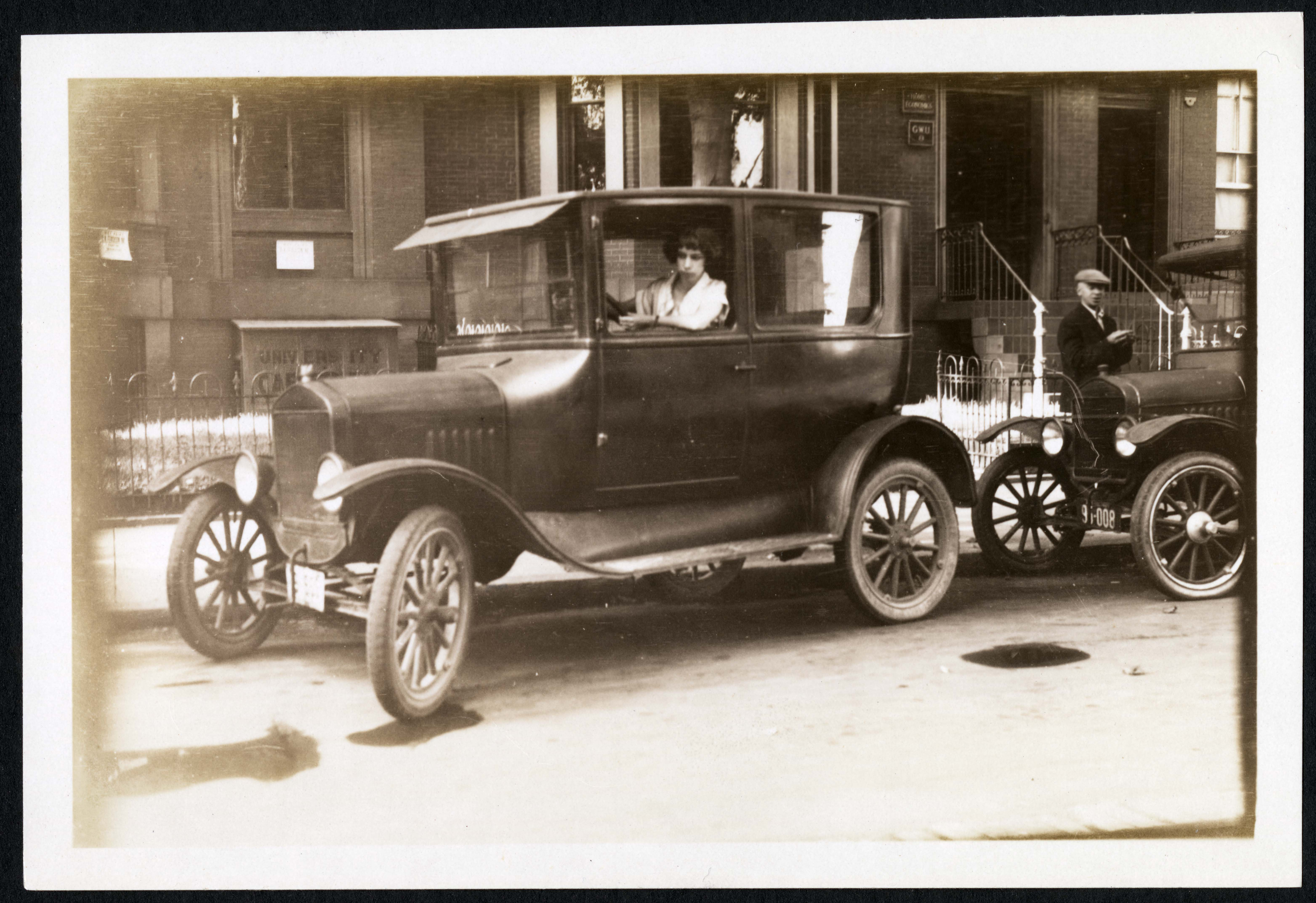
- Born: November 30, 1903; Aurora
- Died: June 23, 1992 (aged 88); Washington, D.C.
- Alma mater: George Washington University
- Occupation: Psychologist
- Employer: George Washington University

Thelma Hunt (November 30, 1903 – June 23, 1992) was an American expert in psychological testing. Chair of the George Washington University Psychology Department for twenty-five years, she was an innovator in test construction and measurement for what is now known as industrial and organizational psychology. Hunt and her frequent collaborator Fred A. Moss developed several tests still in use, including the first version of the Medical College Admission Test (MCAT).

== Early life and education ==
Thelma Hunt was born in Aurora, Arkansas on November 30, 1903. Her father worked for the Veteran's Administration and the family settled in Berwyn, Maryland. Hunt made the long daily commute to Washington, D.C. to attend Central High School. Her Latin teacher encouraged her to apply for college and Hunt's high score on a scholarship exam earned her a scholarship from George Washington University (GW).

Hunt began studying at George Washington University in 1921 with a focus in chemistry. One of her professors, Fred Moss, persuaded her to change her major to psychology. By the age of 23, she had earned three degrees from the psychology department: a bachelor's degree with distinction (1924), a Master of Arts (1925) and a Ph.D. (1927). While working as a full-time employee, she became the youngest person to receive a Ph.D. from GW. Her Ph.D. thesis was titled A Study of Social Intelligence of Ten Thousand Persons in Industry and in College Life.

== Early career and medical degree ==
During her undergraduate degree, Hunt began working with the United States Civil Service Commission developing mental tests (psychological tests). She worked there from 1923 to 1927 under the supervision of Dr. Lawrence O'Rourke. After she received her Ph.D., O'Rourke advised her there would be no room for advancement within her current role and encouraged her to continue her career elsewhere so her talent would not be wasted. Hunt left D.C. to take a teaching position at Middle Tennessee State College in 1927.

She returned to D.C. just a year later when she was offered a position as an instructor of psychology at George Washington University. While teaching full time, Hunt studied for her medical degree at GW. As no internships were available in D.C. for women at the time, she completed her internship at Englewood General Hospital in New Jersey. After earning her M.D. degree in 1935, graduating second in a class of 72 students, she was offered a full professorship in psychology at GW.

== Later career ==
Hunt was appointed Chair of the GW Psychology Department in 1938, a position she held until 1963. The department developed several programs under her leadership, including rehabilitation counseling and a clinical psychology program affiliated with St. Elizabeths Hospital. She also implemented a personnel psychology program. She directed the Center for Psychological Services, which she helped establish along with Moss and Katherine Omwake.

As department chair she continued her work in psychological testing, often working along with her mentor Moss. Her first book, Measurement In Psychology, was published in 1936. Along with Moss, she developed the first Medical College Admission Test (MCAT) for the Association of American Medical Colleges. They also created aptitude tests for medical personnel for the War Department. Together with Moss and graduate student Florence Wallace Bose, Hunt developed the Teaching Aptitude Test, covering areas such as judgment in teaching situations, reasoning and information concerning school problems, and recognition of mental states from facial expressions. She created aptitude tests for multiple professions, including tests for admission to nursing school as well as strength and agility tests for fire fighters and police officers.

Hunt's expertise extended to abnormal psychology, including conducting the first psychological research evaluating the results of lobotomies done on psychiatric patients. Along with Walter Freeman, she coauthored a 1942 book titled Psychosurgery : Intelligence, Emotion and Social Behavior Following Prefrontal Lobotomy for Mental Disorders.

Other accomplishments included serving as associate editor for the Encyclopedia of Psychology (1984) and founding the Conference of State Psychological Association (later the Division of State Psychological Affairs) for the American Psychological Association. She became Professor Emerita of Psychology in 1969, and continued teaching a Psychological Testing course until 1986.

== Death and legacy ==
Hunt received recognition throughout her career, including being awarded the Stockberger Achievement Award from the International Public Management Association for Human Resources (1983) and being selected as an "Eminent Woman in Psychology" by the American Psychological Association (1985).

She died in Washington, D.C., on June 23, 1992.

Psi Chi awards the Thelma Hunt Research Grant annually to members carrying out empirical research.
