= Fred August Moss =

American psychologist

Fred A. Moss
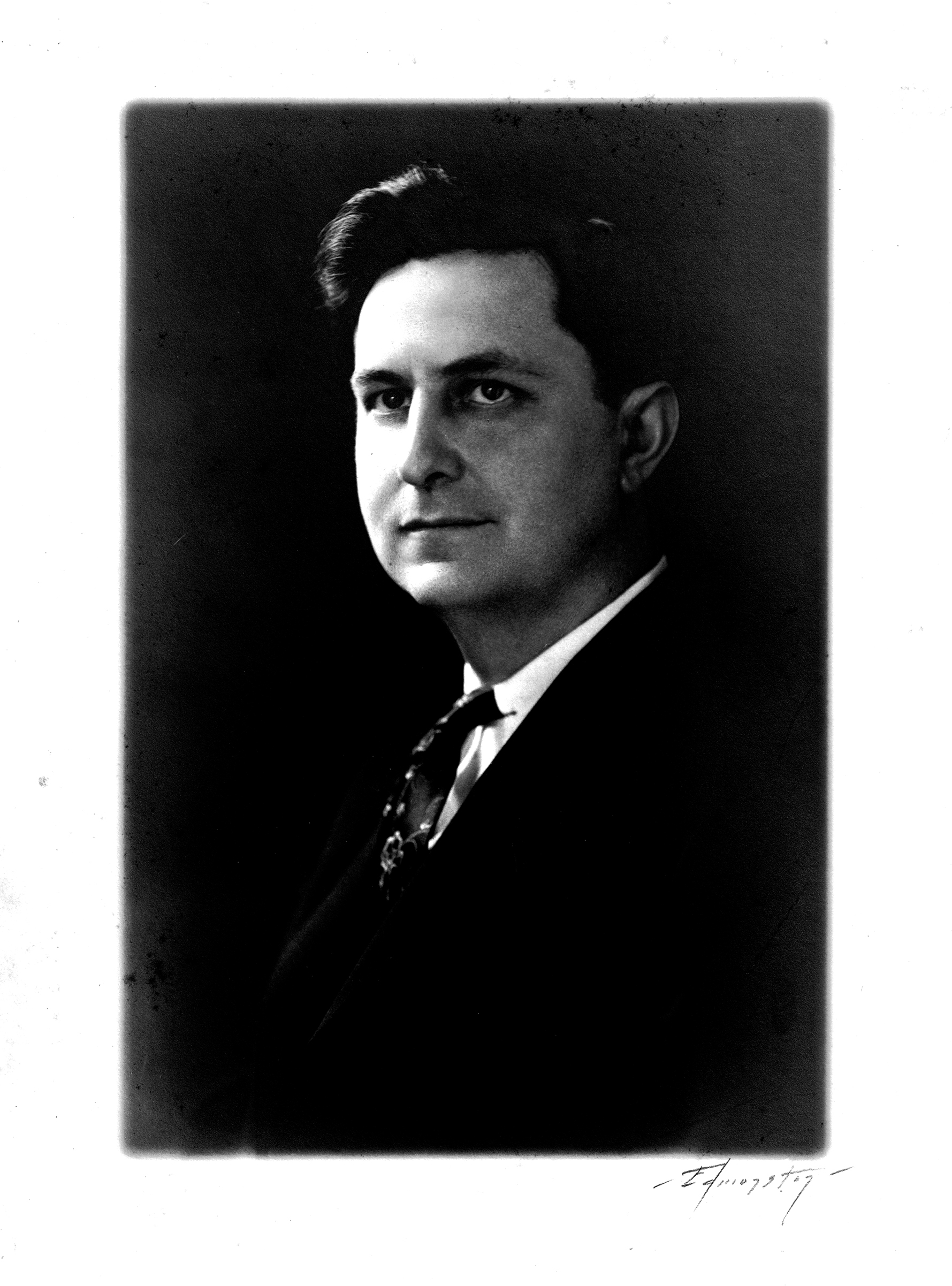
- Born: Fred August Moss; August 31, 1893; Tusquittee, North Carolina, United States
- Died: July 27, 1966 (aged 72); Alexandria, Virginia
- Occupations: Psychologist, physician
- Known for: Early research of psychological testing Developed first MCAT

Academic background
- Education: Mercer University (BA); Columbia University (MA); George Washington University (PhD)
- Academic advisors: Edward Thorndike

Academic work
- Institutions: George Washington University
- Doctoral students: Thelma Hunt

Fred August Moss (August 31, 1893 – July 27, 1966) was an American psychologist, physician and educator. He served as professor and chairman of the Department of Psychology at George Washington University. Moss is best known for his primary work in the 1920s, leading the development of what later became the Medical College Aptitude Test (MCAT).

A named charity trust was set up in his name in 1964 and continues to support educational and charitable initiatives.

== Early life and education ==
Fred August Moss was born in 1893 in Tusquittee, North Carolina, a rural mountain community. His mother Ora Russell worked as a teacher and postmistress and in his youth he used to help her. Moss would deliver mail on a mule and since the mule knew the route, he used the time to read Shakespeare. He went on to study at Mercer University, receiving his Bachelor of Arts degree in 1913. He then began his career as a teacher in Alma, Georgia.

Moss then started at Columbia University where he studied Psychology under Edward Thorndike's stewardship. He earned a Master of Arts in 1921. He completed his Ph.D. in 1922 at George Washington University, with his thesis studying animal drives. In 1927 and still at GWU, he completed his medical degree.

== Career ==
While studying at GWU, Moss joined the Psychology Faculty in 1921. While there his responsibilities slowly grew and by 1925, he had already begun shaping the university's approach to assessment, introducing true/false and short-answer testing across courses. The following year, his expertise in human performance led him to serve as Secretary for the Committee on the Causes of Accidents at the National Conference on Street and Highway Safety. In 1927, Moss was appointed chairman of the Psychology Department. He conducted research on the effects of sleeplessness on mental and physical performance and explored human reaction times in driving, demonstrating no difference between the sexes. Moss held the position as chair until 1934, during which time he mentored students who would become his collaborators, including Thelma Hunt. He also developed tests to measure aptitudes for teaching, as well as intelligence and social intelligence, further cementing his reputation in applied psychology at George Washington University. Moss also founded the Moss Sanitarium in Alexandria, VA during this period of his life.

Thelma Hunt later recalled his excellent teaching methods, "Students clamored to take his courses. They arrived for classes early and stayed afterwards, hopeful of a few extra minutes with him." At this early stage in his career, he commonly used unorthodox approach to psychological testing and experiments. One such example in the Asheville Citizen-Times recalls him suddenly producing from his pockets a pair of white mice, who he called "Anthony and Cleopatra", due to his fondness of Shakespeare from when he was a child. With one mouse in each hand he asked, "now which do you prefer, food or each other?"

While at GWU, the United States was suffering from appalling medical dropout rates. At some schools they had seen drop out rates increase from 5% to 50%. The Moss Test as it later became known, was based on Moss' 1925 multiple choice tests he developed at GWU. Along with the help of colleagues Thelma Hunt and Katharine T. Omwake to create the "Scholastic Aptitude Test for Medical Students". In 1928, it was first administered and became the first iteration of what would later become the Medical College Admission Test (MCAT). He success of this test led Moss to serve as the director of study of the Aptitude Test Committee, Association of American Medical Colleges. The true-false and multiple-choice test would be part of the reason why dropout rates fell back to 7% by 1946.

== Personal life ==
Moss was known to keep a pencil and paper to hand, as he would often write poetry. Later in his life, he self-published a his poetry book, “The Quest of Happiness.” Moss also published a short guide on personal investing, after successfully applying his psychological principles to finance.

In 1964, a charitable trust set up in his name was created. Its first major investment helped re-build Moss Memorial Church near his childhood home. The trust also contributed to the construction of the Moss Memorial Public Library in Hayesville, North Carolina during the same year. Since his death, the trust has continued to support religious, charitable, scientific, and educational causes, with particular emphasis on training future scientists and physicians.

Moss died at his home in Alexandria, Virginia, on July 27, 1966.

== Publications ==
The published works by Moss presented his conclusions on psychology, arguing that both humans and animals are shaped by identifiable external and internal influences. He also maintained that human behavior results from the interplay between these forces and an individual's innate nature, as molded by their past experiences.

He authored psychology texts and other books, including:

- Applications of Psychology (1929) Houghton Mifflin Co
- Psychology for Nurses (1931) Houghton Mifflin Co.
- Foundations of Abnormal Psychology (1932, with Thelma Hunt) Prentice Hall
- Comparative Psychology (1934) Prentice Hall
- Two Dozen Clues for the Doctor’s Successful Investments (1961) Prentice Hall
- The Quest of Happiness (1965) Poetry by F.A. Moss (Poetry and Philosophy)
