= Bruce Harreld =

American businessman and academic administrator

21st President of The University of Iowa
- In office November 2, 2015 – May 16, 2021
- Preceded by: Sally Mason
- Succeeded by: Barbara J. Wilson

Personal details
- Born: James Bruce Harreld; December 12, 1950 (age 75) Gallipolis, Ohio, U.S.
- Spouse: Mary Harreld
- Children: 4
- Education: Purdue University (BS); Harvard Business School (MBA)
- Profession: Business consultant, university president

James Bruce Harreld (born December 12, 1950) is an American businessman and academic administrator who was the 21st president of the University of Iowa from 2015 to 2021. Formerly a business consultant, Harreld succeeded Sally Mason as president on November 2, 2015, after serving in senior corporate roles at Kraft Foods, Boston Market, and IBM. He was also held appointments as adjunct professor at the Kellogg School of Management and senior lecturer at Harvard Business School.

== Early life and education ==
Harreld was born and raised in Gallipolis, Ohio. His father, James Sr., grew up on an 80-acre farm in Marion, Indiana, and spent the bulk of his career building power plants across the Midwest for the United States Atomic Energy Commission. His mother, Ann, was from Indianapolis. Her parents had emigrated from Romania and managed a grocery store that suffered during the Great Depression. Ann later earned a master's degree in education and became a teacher.

Harreld graduated from Purdue University in 1972 with a degree in industrial engineering, then received an M.B.A. from Harvard Business School in 1975.

== Career ==
Following his graduation from Harvard, Harreld participated on consulting teams at Boston Consulting Group and aided in opening additional offices in Chicago and Munich, eventually serving as vice president and board member until 1983. He then worked as senior vice president and division president at Kraft Foods until 1993, overseeing the frozen food unit.

From 1993 to 1994, Harreld was an adjunct professor at Northwestern University. He was also president and board member at Boston Market from 1993 to 1995, a time of massive expansion for the company. Harreld later served as senior vice president at IBM from 1995 to 2008, overseeing strategic restructuring of the organization.

From 2008 to 2014, Harreld was an adjunct professor at Harvard Business School in both the entrepreneurial and strategy units. He then briefly pursued freelance business consulting. In September 2015, the Iowa Board of Regents offered him the role of president at the University of Iowa. His term began November 2, 2015. Harreld's contract was renewed until 2023 in a process described as "opaque", but he retired in 2020.

Harreld's appointment to the presidency of the University of Iowa was a controversial one, with his faculty objecting to the fact that he does not possess a doctorate, had limited publications to his name, and had minimal experience working in higher education. A survey undertaken in 2015 showed that fewer than 5 percent of university faculty felt that Harreld was qualified for the position. In September 2015, the Faculty Senate voted no confidence in Iowa Board of Regents as a result of Harreld's appointment.

The exclusion of standard faculty input from the selection process by the Iowa Board of Regents led to the University of Iowa being formally sanctioned by the American Association of University Presidents. Other irregularities in the hiring process, such as the Regents' efforts to circumvent Iowa Open Meetings Law to meet secretly with Harreld on numerous occasions before his hiring, led to a lawsuit.

Harreld's stance on public health and classroom safety during the COVID-19 pandemic was also a source of controversy. Critics claimed that Harreld's actions increased the risk of disease transmission among the university community.

Academic offices
Preceded by Sally Mason; Jean Robillard (interim)	21st President of the University of Iowa; 2015 – 2021	Succeeded by Barbara J. Wilson
