= Raynard S. Kington =

American doctor and educator

Raynard Stuart Kington
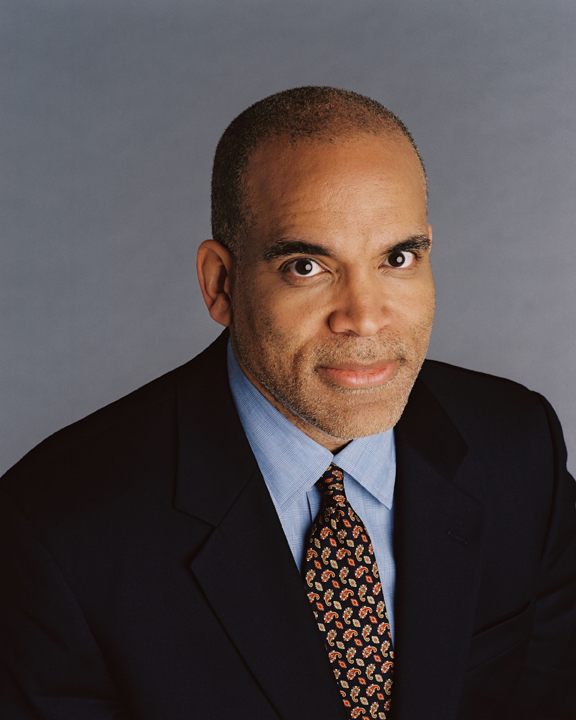
- Official portrait, 2008

16th Head of School of Phillips Academy
- Incumbent
- Assumed office July 1, 2020
- Preceded by: John Palfrey

13th President of Grinnell College
- In office August 1, 2010 – June 30, 2020
- Preceded by: Russell K. Osgood
- Succeeded by: Anne F. Harris

Principal Deputy Director of the National Institutes of Health
- In office February 9, 2003 – August 1, 2010
- Succeeded by: Lawrence A. Tabak

Acting Director of the National Institutes of Health
- In office October 31, 2008 – August 17, 2009

Personal details
- Education: University of Michigan (BS, MD); University of Pennsylvania (MBA, PhD)
- Scientific career
- Fields: Health policy
- Thesis: The effects of liability on the practice patterns of obstetricians and gynecologists (1991)

Raynard Stuart Kington is an American academic administrator. He has been the 16th head of school of Phillips Academy Andover since 2020. He previously was the 13th president of Grinnell College in Iowa from August 2010 to June 2020 and the principal deputy director of the National Institutes of Health from February 2003 to October 2010.

== Early life and education ==
Kington was born and raised in Baltimore, Maryland, the son of Dr. Garfield Kington, an internist, and Mildred Kington, a school teacher and community leader.

At age 16, Kington became a student at the University of Michigan. He received a Bachelor of Science degree at age 19 and a Doctor of Medicine degree at age 21. He completed a residency in internal medicine at Michael Reese Medical Center in Chicago. He was then appointed as a Robert Wood Johnson Clinical Scholar at the University of Pennsylvania. While at the University of Pennsylvania, he received a Master of Business Administration degree and a Doctor of Philosophy degree in health policy and economics from the Wharton School.

== Career ==
Centers for Disease Control and Prevention

Following appointments on the UCLA medical school faculty and as a senior scientist at RAND, Kington was director of the Division of Health Examination Statistics at the National Center for Health Statistics of the CDC where he also served as director of the National Health and Nutrition Examination Survey from 1998 to 2000.

=== National Institutes of Health ===
Kington served in several leadership positions at the National Institutes of Health beginning in 2000, including principal deputy from 2003 to 2008. He led the agency as acting director from October 2008 until August 2009, when Francis Collins was appointed director. He continued to serve as principal deputy director until August 2010. Speaking of Kington's tenure at the agency, Senator Tom Harkin praised his leadership for judiciously allocating $10 billion in congressionally-approved funds, implementing then president Obama's Executive Order on human embryonic stem cell research, and strengthening conflict of interest regulations. As Deputy Director, he co-authored a study which found that Black scientists were less likely than White scientists to win approval of research grants, exposing racial discrimination in academia.

=== Grinnell College ===
On February 17, 2010, the Board of Trustees of Grinnell College announced that Kington had been appointed as the incoming 13th president of Grinnell College, effective August 1, 2010.

Kington led an effort to invest $140 million in renewing the campus. During his presidency, he created a $300,000 annual prize to honor three persons throughout the world who have advanced the cause of social justice; the Grinnell College Innovator for Social Justice Prize has attracted substantial interest since its inception in 2010, and it has been cited as being the largest award of its kind by The Nation. In addition, Kington established a fund to spur innovation, oversaw the allocation of $140 million for campus buildings, and promoted ties to the city of Grinnell through investment programs. He faced criticism for his handling of an effort to expand the Union of Grinnell Student Dining Workers. In the early stages of the COVID-19 pandemic in March 2020, there were no cases at Grinnell, but Kington and the administration asked students to go home and continue their learning online, as a general safety precaution.

Kington officially ended his presidency at Grinnell College on June 30, 2020.

=== Phillips Academy Andover ===
In December 2019, Kington was appointed by the Board of Trustees as the 16th Head of School of Phillips Academy in Andover. He took over the role on July 1, 2020, succeeding John Palfrey. Kington is the first African-American and openly gay head of school since the academy was founded in 1778.. The end of his tenure as Head of School will be June 2027.

Kington has served on the governing council of the National Academy of Medicine and on the boards of the American Council on Education and the Des Moines Arts Center. He currently serves on the boards of RAND, Beth Israel Lahey Health, The Pew Charitable Trusts, and the National Opinion Research Center at the University of Chicago.

== Personal life ==
Kington is married to Dr. Peter T. Daniolos, a child and adolescent psychiatrist at the Cambridge Health Alliance and on the faculty at Harvard Medical School. They have two sons.
