= Lonnie Bunch =

American educator and historian

- Bunch in 2026

14th Secretary of the Smithsonian Institution
- Incumbent
- Assumed office June 16, 2019
- Preceded by: David J. Skorton

Personal details
- Born: November 18, 1952 (age 73) Newark, New Jersey, U.S.
- Education: Howard University (attended); American University (BA, MA, PhD)
- Occupation: Educator and historian

Academic work
- Discipline: History of the United States; African American studies
- Institutions: Smithsonian Institution; National Museum of African American History and Culture; Chicago History Museum; National Museum of American History; California African American Museum; University of Maryland, College Park

Lonnie Griffith Bunch III (born November 18, 1952) is an American educator and historian. Bunch is the fourteenth secretary of the Smithsonian Institution, the first African American and first historian to serve as head of the Smithsonian. He has spent most of his career as a history museum curator and administrator.

Bunch served as the founding director of the Smithsonian's National Museum of African American History and Culture (NMAAHC) from 2005 to 2019. He previously served as president and director of the Chicago History Museum (Chicago Historical Society) from 2000 to 2005. In the 1980s, he was the first curator at the California African American Museum, and then a curator at the Smithsonian's National Museum of American History, where, in the 1990s, he rose to head curatorial affairs. In 2020, he was elected to the American Philosophical Society.

== Early life and education ==
Bunch was born in Newark, New Jersey, in 1952 to Lonnie Bunch II, a science and chemistry public school teacher, and Montrose Bunch, a third-grade public school teacher, both graduates of Shaw University, one of the oldest HBCUs in the South. He grew up in Belleville, New Jersey, where his family were the only African Americans in their neighborhood. His grandfather, a former sharecropper, moved into the area as one of the first black dentists in the region. As a child, he experienced racism from white teenagers in his neighborhood. Bunch credits his childhood experiences with local Italian immigrants and his reading of biographies as a youth with inspiring him to study history. He wanted to give a voice to those who were "anonymous" or not written about. Reflecting in 2011 on the early exposures, Bunch said: "I was in junior high, and we were reading biographies of historic figures. I remember one on Gen. ‘Mad Anthony’ Wayne, and one on Clara Barton, and Dorothea Dix. I thought, ‘Were there no histories of black people?’ One day, I was going through my grandfather's trunk and I found a book about black soldiers in the First World War. I devoured it."

Bunch graduated from Belleville High School in Belleville, New Jersey, in 1970. He attended Howard University and later transferred to the American University in Washington, D.C., where he earned his B.A., M.A., and Ph.D. in American and African-American history.

== Career ==
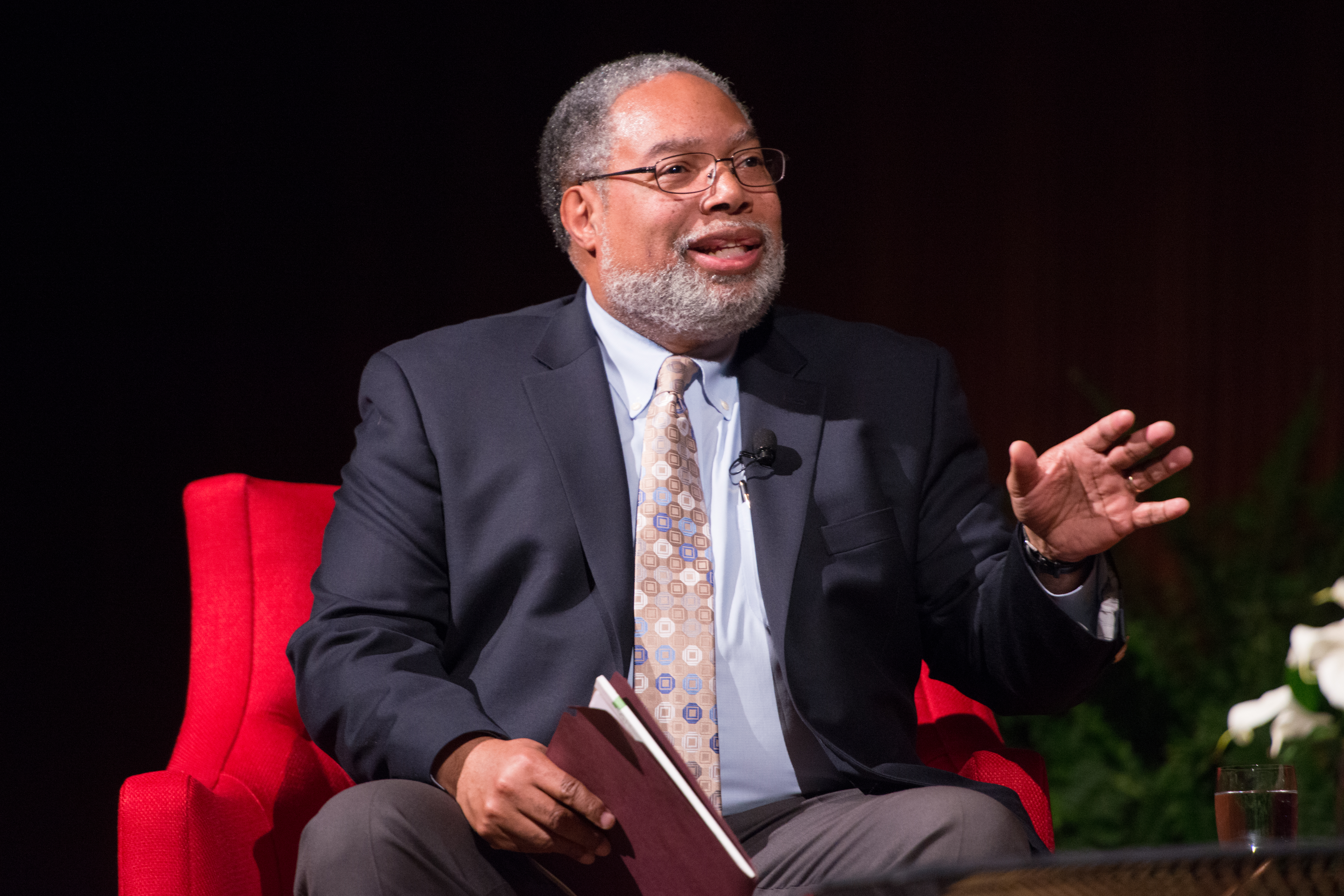
Bunch moderating a civil rights panel at the Lyndon Baines Johnson Library and Museum in 2014

Bunch began working at the Smithsonian Institution while completing his master's degree. After graduating, he joined the University of Maryland faculty as a history professor. In 1983, he became the first curator at the California African American Museum. He worked at the National Museum of American History from 1989 until 1994 as a curator. From 1990 to 2000, he was also a professor in the Museum Studies and History departments at The George Washington University. He was promoted to associate director for curatorial affairs at the museum, before leaving in 2000 to become the president of one of the nation's oldest history museums, the Chicago Historical Society (Chicago History Museum), from 2001 to 2005. In Chicago, he led a successful capital campaign, and promoted outreach to diverse communities. One noted exhibit, Teen Chicago, focused on teenager life.

In 2005, Bunch was named the director of the Smithsonian Institution's National Museum of African American History and Culture. As founding director, he designed a program of traveling exhibitions and public events prior to the opening of the museum.

He also served on the Commission for the Preservation of the White House during the George W. Bush administration and was reappointed to the Commission by President Barack Obama in 2010.

On February 12, 2021, Bunch was appointed to the Congressionally-mandated Commission on the Naming of Items of the Department of Defense that Commemorate the Confederate States of America or Any Person Who Served Voluntarily with the Confederate States of America. He later withdrew from the commission for personal reasons prior to the swearing-in ceremony.

=== Smithsonian Institution ===
On May 28, 2019, Bunch was elected secretary of the Smithsonian Institution. He became the first historian and first African American to lead the Smithsonian in its 173-year history, he began his new role on June 16, 2019.

On September 8, 2026, Bunch announced that he would retire as secretary at the end of 2026, for personal reasons. Despite speculation, Bunch said that political pressure from President Donald Trump had not influenced the decision and that he would defend the institution's independence until his departure.

=== Exhibits and research ===
Bunch curated the National Museum of American History's exhibition The American Presidency: A Glorious Burden. The exhibition was curated, built, and opened within eight months.

== Personal life ==
Bunch met his wife Maria Marable in graduate school. They have two daughters.

== Awards ==
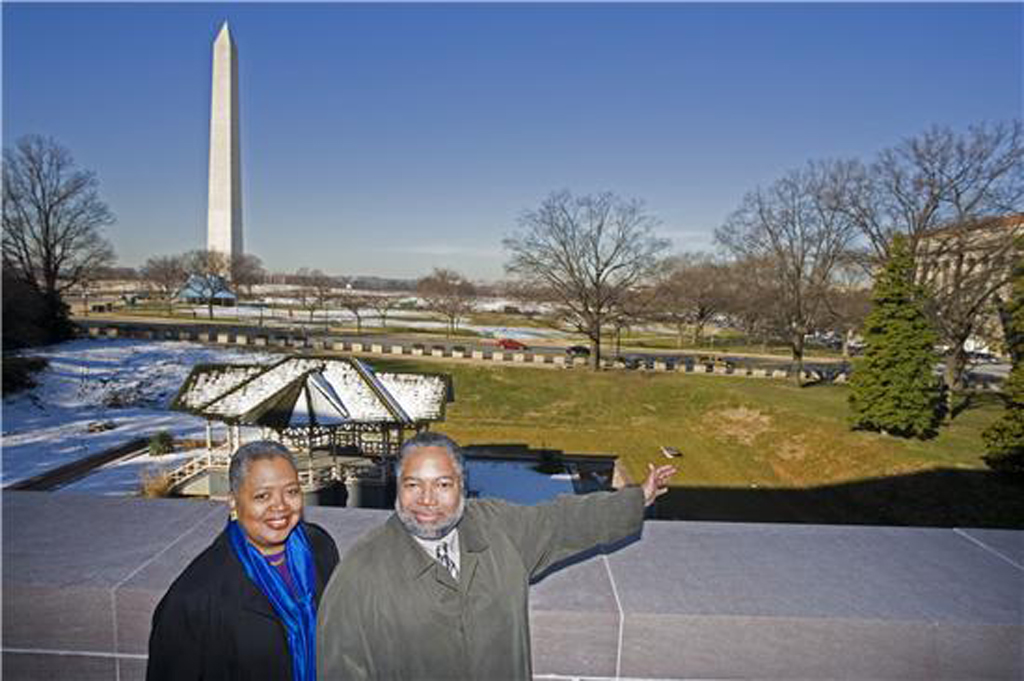
Bunch and Kinshasha Holman Conwill at the future location of the National Museum of African American History and Culture in 2006

- 2005: Named one of the 100 most influential museum professionals of the 20th century by American Association of Museums
- 2011: Jackie Robinson Society Community Recognition Award
- 2016: Visionary Historian Award from the Historical Society of Washington, D.C.
- 2017: inducted into the American Academy of Arts and Sciences
- 2017: the NAACP's President's Award
- 2017: Honorary Doctor of Humane Letters from Georgetown University
- 2018: Choral Arts [Society of Washington] Humanitarian Award
- 2018: Phi Beta Kappa Award for Distinguished Service to Humanity
- 2019: Honorary degree of Brown University (LHD)
- 2020: Dan David Prize – shared with Barbara Kirshenblatt-Gimblett in the "Past" category, recognizing contributions in the field of cultural preservation and revival
- 2021: The Tony Horwitz Prize from the Society of American Historians
- 2022: Golden Plate Award of the American Academy of Achievement
- 2023: Honorary Doctor of Humane Letters from Yale University

== Written works ==
- with Laurence P. and Martha Kendall Crouchette Winnaker, Visions Toward Tomorrow, the History of the East Bay Afro-American Community 1852–1977. Oakland: Northern California Center for Afro-American History and Life. 1989. ISBN 0-9622334-0-4
- with Spencer R. Crew, Mark G. Hirsch and Harry R. Rubenstein, 2000. The American Presidency, A Glorious Burden. Washington: Smithsonian Institution. ISBN 978-1560988359
- with Donna M. Wells, David E. Haberstitch and Deborah Willis, 2009. The Scurlock Studio and Black Washington: Picturing the Promise. Washington: National Museum of African American History and Culture. ISBN 978-1588342720
- Call the Lost Dream Back: Essays on History, Race & Museums. Georgia: Big River Books. 2010. ISBN 978-1933253176
- with Spencer R. Crew and Clement A. Price, 2014. Slave Culture: A Documentary Collection of the Slave Narratives from the Federal Writers Project. Connecticut: Greenwood. ISBN 978-1440800863
- Bunch, Lonnie G. (2019). A Fool's Errand: Creating the National Museum of African American History and Culture in the age of Bush, Obama, and Trump. Washington, DC: Smithsonian Institution Scholarly Press. ISBN 9781588346681. OCLC 1089275852.

Government offices
Preceded by David J. Skorton	14th Secretary of the Smithsonian Institution; 2019–present	Incumbent
