= Willard L. Boyd =

American lawyer (1927–2022)

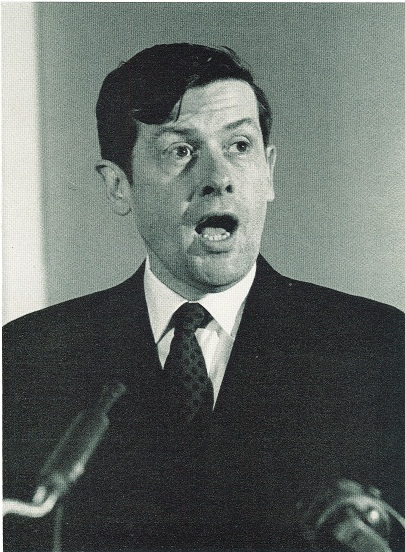
- Boyd from 1969 Hawkeye

15th President of The University of Iowa
- In office 1969 – 1981
- Preceded by: Howard Rothmann Bowen
- Succeeded by: James O. Freedman

Vice President of Academic Affairs
- In office 1964 – 1968
- 1964: Associate Dean of the College of Law

Personal details
- Born: Willard Lee Boyd; March 29, 1927 St. Paul, Minnesota
- Died: December 13, 2022 (aged 95) Iowa City, Iowa
- Spouse: Susan Kuehn (m. 1954)
- Education: University of Minnesota
- Profession: Lawyer, professor, university administrator
- Cabinet: Field Museum of Natural History
- Committees: American Academy of Arts and Sciences; American Law Institute; Department of State Cultural Property Advisory Committee; National Arts Strategies; Iowa Cultural Trust
- Awards: Charles Frankel Prize (1989)

Military service
- Allegiance: United States
- Branch/service: United States Navy
- Years of service: 1945-1947
- Rank: Corpsman

Willard Lee Boyd (March 29, 1927 – December 13, 2022) was an American legal scholar, academic administrator and president of the University of Iowa and Field Museum of Natural History in Chicago, Illinois. He was latterly part of the faculty of the University of Iowa College of Law as the Rawlings/Miller Professor of Law and President Emeritus.

== Early years and career ==
Boyd was born on March 29, 1927. He grew up on Commonwealth Avenue in St. Paul, Minnesota, and attended Murray High School, St. Paul, Minnesota, graduating in 1944. He served as a U.S. Navy Hospital Corpsman from 1945 to 1947. He went on to the University of Minnesota, where he earned his B.S.L. in 1949, and received his LL.B. from the University of Minnesota Law School in 1951. He was admitted to the Minnesota Bar in 1951. Boyd then attended the University of Michigan Law School, where he received an LL.M. in 1952. He worked as an associate attorney at Minneapolis law firm Dorsey & Whitney from 1952 to 1954.

== Academia ==
After a brief time in private practice, Boyd entered academia, teaching law at The University of Iowa College of Law from 1954 to 1964; during this time he earned his S.J.D. from Michigan in 1962. He became a member of the Iowa Bar in 1958. His career as an academic administrator began in 1964, when he served as Associate Dean of the College of Law before becoming Vice President of Academic Affairs and Dean of the Faculties for The University of Iowa, a position he held from 1964 to 1968.

In 1969, Boyd succeeded Howard Bowen as the fifteenth President of The University of Iowa. He served until 1981, and was eventually followed by James O. Freedman. He served as Chairman of the American Association of Universities from 1979 to 1980.

During Boyd's presidency, the athletic department hired three of the most successful coaches in school history: Lute Olson (men's basketball, 1974–83), Dan Gable (wrestling, 1976–97) and Hayden Fry (football, 1979–98). In 1970, Boyd hired former Michigan football coach Bump Elliott to replace Forest Evashevski as athletic director. Elliott was responsible for the hires of Olson, Gable and Fry, as well as C. Vivian Stringer as women's basketball coach and Dr. Tom Davis as Olson's replacement in 1983 following Boyd's resignation.

After ending his tenure as a university president, Boyd served as the President of the Field Museum of Natural History in Chicago from 1981 to 1996. During this time, he was one of the first recipients of the Charles Frankel Prize (now the National Humanities Medal) in 1989, honoring his efforts to bring history, literature, philosophy and other humanities disciplines to general audiences.

Boyd returned to Iowa in 1996 to teach at the College of Law again. A central focus of his return to Iowa was creating the Iowa Nonprofit Resource Center (which became the Larned A. Waterman Iowa Nonprofit Resource Center after a significant gift from the Waterman family); he taught courses which supported learning in the nonprofit area. In 2002 he served as interim president, holding the role between 2002 and 2003 until being succeeded by David J. Skorton. After serving as Acting President, he returned to teaching as the Rawlings-Miller Professor of Law in 2003; he also was the Chester Phillips Research Fellow at the Tippie College of Business at Iowa from 2003 to 2006.

Boyd was a member of the American Academy of Arts and Sciences, the American Law Institute, the Department of State Cultural Property Advisory Committee and the board of National Arts Strategies and chaired the Iowa Cultural Trust. He was also a Trustee of the Roy J. Carver Trust.

The Boyd Law Building at the University of Iowa is named for him.

Boyd died on December 13, 2022, at the age of 95.

Academic offices
Preceded by Howard Bowen	President of the University of Iowa; 1969–1981	Succeeded by Duane C. Spriestersbach (acting); James O. Freedman
Preceded by Mary Sue Coleman	Acting President of the University of Iowa; 2002–2003	Succeeded by David J. Skorton
