= Darrell Kirch =

American physician

Darrell G. Kirch (/kɜːrtʃ/ KURCH) is an American physician who is president and CEO emeritus of the Association of American Medical Colleges (AAMC). He trained as a psychiatrist and neuroscientist, before going on to hold senior administrative positions at several medical colleges.

== Education and early career ==
He studied medicine at University of Colorado Denver, graduating with a BA and then with an MD in 1977. He completed a residency in psychiatry in 1982.

== Leadership roles ==
He worked at the National Institute of Mental Health, becoming the acting scientific director in 1993.

In 1994 he became Dean of the School of Medicine at the Medical College of Georgia (MCG). In 2000, Kirch he took up the positions of Dean of the Penn State College of Medicine and CEO of Penn State Milton S. Hershey Medical Center.

He joined the AAMC's Executive Council in 2001, then in July 2006, he took up the position of president and CEO. He is a keynote speaker at multiple conferences and meetings including SUO/AADO/OPDO Combined Meeting 2018 and Association of Academic Psychiatry Annual Meeting 2018.

On July 15, 2019, he stepped down from his position at the AAMC. David J. Skorton, the former Secretary of the Smithsonian Institution, succeeds him in the leadership role.

== Personal life ==
He is married to Deborah and they have two daughters.

== Awards and honors ==
He was awarded the Public Health Service Outstanding Service Medal.

He received the University of Colorado Denver's "Silver and Gold" award in 2002. He was awarded an honorary Doctor of Science in 2013.
