= Grinnell College Innovator for Social Justice Prize =

The Grinnell College Innovator for Social Justice Prize
- Awarded for: outstanding contributions in effecting positive social change
- Location: Grinnell, Iowa
- Country: United States
- Presented by: Grinnell College
- Reward: $50,000
- First award: 2011
- Website: www.grinnell.edu/about/social-innovation-residence

The Grinnell College Innovator for Social Justice Prize (Grinnell Prize), created by Grinnell College, is an annual program honoring individuals who have demonstrated leadership in their fields and "who show creativity, commitment, and extraordinary accomplishment in effecting positive social change."

Each year a $50,000 award is given, with half going to the individual and half to their organization.

== History ==
The Innovator for Social Justice Prize program was announced in November, 2010.

The idea for Innovator for Social Justice Prize originated with Raynard S. Kington, M.D., Ph.D., who began his tenure as Grinnell's thirteenth president in August 2010. In underscoring the college's longstanding belief in social justice as a core tenet of its liberal arts academic mission, President Kington noted that the prize was created to "encourage and recognize young individuals who embody our core values and organizations that share our commitment to change the world."

The program drew more than 1,000 nominations from 66 countries in its initial year.

== Nomination criteria ==
Nominations are evaluated based on how candidates have embraced the values of a liberal arts education, including critical thinking, creative problem-solving, free inquiry and commitment to using and sharing knowledge to better humanity.

In seeking nominations each fall, Grinnell encourages entries from across a wide range of fields, including science, medicine, the environment, humanities, business, economics, education, law, public policy, social services, religion and ethics, as well as projects that cross these boundaries. Nominations are also encouraged from areas that may not have been traditionally viewed as directly connected to social justice, such as the arts and business. Nominees may be U.S. citizens or nationals of other countries; no affiliation to Grinnell College is required.

=== Selection committee ===
Committee members are recognized individuals who work for social change in various capacities – largely Iowa-based – and represent the college's faculty, student body, alumni, staff and trustees, plus prominent individuals not formally affiliated with Grinnell.

== List of winners by year ==
=== 2011 ===
- Boris Bulayev, president, and Eric Glustrom, executive director, Educate!
- James Kofi Annan, executive director, Challenging Heights
- Rabbi Melissa Weintraub, co-founder and director emeritus, Encounter

=== 2012 ===
- Cristi Hegranes, founder and executive director, Global Press Institute
- Jacob Wood, co-founder and chief executive officer, and William McNulty, co-founder and managing director, Team Rubicon
- Jane Chen and Linus Liang, co-founders, Embrace

=== 2013 ===
- Emily Arnold-Fernandez, founder and executive director, Asylum Access
- Elizabeth Scharpf, founder and chief instigating officer, and Julian Ingabire Kayibanda, chief operations officer in Rwanda, SHE (Sustainable Health Enterprises)

=== 2014 ===
- Ani Vallabhaneni and Lindsay Stradley, co-founders, Sanergy
- Adam Kircher and Kiah Williams, co-founders and co-directors, SIRUM (Supporting Initiatives to Redistribute Unused Medicine)

=== 2015 ===
- Deborah Osei-Agyekum, co-founder, Golden Baobab
- Maria Vertkin, founder, Found in Translation

=== 2016 ===
- Luna Ranjit, founder, Adhikaar
- Diana Jue Rajasingh and Jackie Stenson, co-founders, Essmart

=== 2017 ===
- Gina L. Clayton, founder, Essie Justice Group

=== 2018 ===
- Mélanie Marcel, founder, SoScience

=== 2019 ===
- Shafiq R. Khan, founder, Empower People

=== 2020 ===
- Alexander McLean, founder, Justice Defenders
