= Schenella romana =

Scientific classification
- Kingdom: Fungi
- Division: Basidiomycota
- Class: Agaricomycetes
- Order: Geastrales
- Family: Geastraceae
- Genus: Schenella
- Species: S. romana

Binomial name
- Schenella romana Quadr. Estrada and Ladó

Synonyms
- Pyrenogaster romanus (Quadr.) Calonge; Radiigera romana Quadr.

Species of fungus

Schenella romana is a species of earthstar found in Italy.
