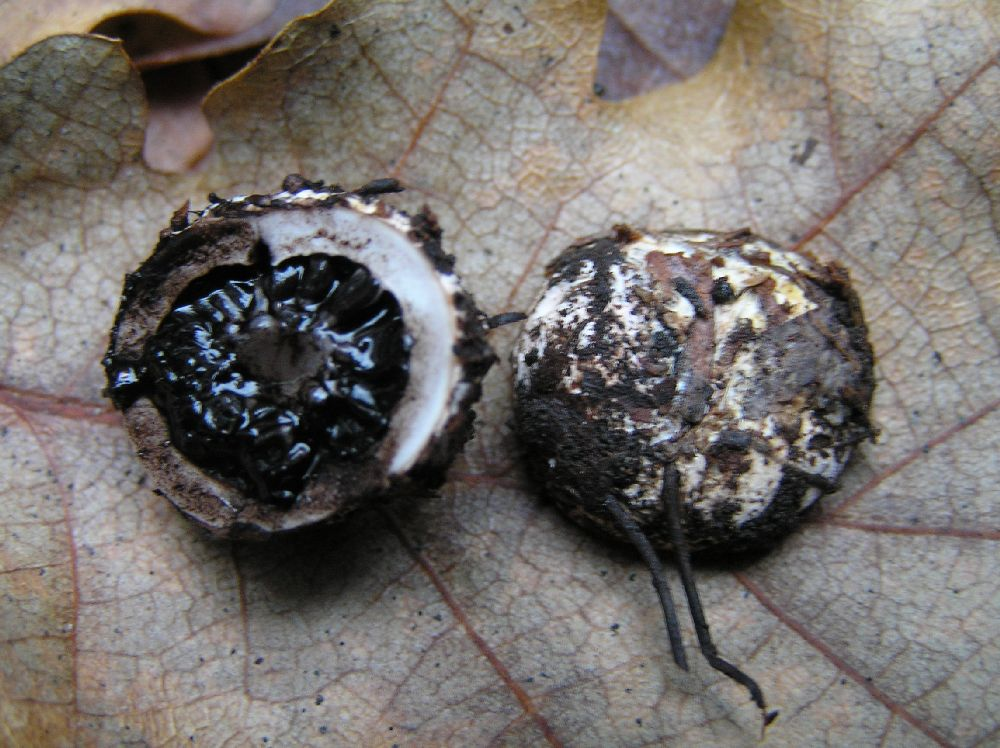

Scientific classification
- Kingdom: Fungi
- Division: Basidiomycota
- Class: Agaricomycetes
- Order: Geastrales
- Family: Geastraceae
- Genus: Schenella
- Species: S. pityophila

Binomial name
- Schenella pityophila (Malençon & Riousset) Estrada & Lado (2005)

Synonyms
- Pyrenogaster pityophilus Malençon & Riousset (1977)

= Schenella pityophila =

Species of fungus

Schenella pityophila is a species of fungus in the family Geastraceae found in Europe. It was originally described in 1977 as Pyrenogaster pityophilus, before being transferred to the genus Schenella in 2005.
