= List of presidents of Grinnell College =

The following is a list of presidents of Grinnell College, a private liberal arts college in Grinnell, Iowa, United States.

Since the college's founding in 1846, Grinnell College has had thirteen presidents and seven temporary acting presidents. A college president is responsible for all aspects of the institution's internal and external affairs, including administrative and academic decision-making.

While Iowa College, later renamed Grinnell College, did not have a president for the first years of its existence, after the Civil War, the trustees chose fellow trustee George Frederic Magoun to lead the institution as it matured. From his inauguration in 1865, Magoun served 19 years, the second-longest presidential tenure in the college's history.

The current Grinnell College president is Anne F. Harris, who replaced president Raynard S. Kington to become the 14th president of the College on July 14, 2020.

== Presidents of the College ==
List of presidents of Grinnell College
No.	Name	Picture	Years	Notes
–	The Trustees of Iowa College		1846–1865	
1	George Frederic Magoun		1865–1884	
acting	Samuel J. Buck		1884–1887	
2	George Augustus Gates		1887–1900	
acting	John Hanson Thomas Main		1900–1902	
3	Dan Freeman Bradley		1902–1905	
4	John Hanson Thomas Main		1905–1931	as acting president in first academic year
5	John Scholte Nollen		1931–1940	
6	Samuel Nowell Stevens		1940–1954	
acting	Rupert Adam Hawk		1954–1955	
7	Howard Rothmann Bowen		1955–1964	
acting	James Hartmann Stauss		1964–1965	
8	Glenn Leggett		1965–1975	President Emeritus of the College 1979–2003
9	A. Richard Turner		1975–1979	
10	George A. Drake		1979–1991	President Emeritus of the College 2005–
acting	Waldo S. Walker		1987	
11	Pamela A. Ferguson		1991–1997	
acting	Charles L. Duke		1998	
12	Russell K. Osgood		1998–2010	
13	Raynard S. Kington		2010–2020	
14	Anne F. Harris		2020–present	
