= Russell K. Osgood =

American academic

Russell King Osgood

Dean of Washington University School of Law
- In office September 1, 2021 – June 30, 2024
- Preceded by: Nancy Staudt (2014-2021)

Personal details
- Spouse: Paula Osgood
- Education: Yale University (BA, JD)

Russell King Osgood is an American lawyer who was the dean of Washington University School of Law. Previously, he served as the 12th president of Grinnell College (1998–2010) and a professor of history and political science. He is a legal scholar and holds a B.A. and J.D. from Yale University, formerly serving as the dean of Cornell Law School. In 2003, Russell Osgood was the highest paid liberal arts college president in the U.S.; he earned $509,130 in the fiscal year ending June 30, 2004.

== Pre-Washington University career ==
- United States Navy, 1969-1971: surface line officer, USS Glover AGDE-1
- Yale Law School, J.D. 1974
- Employed by Hill & Barlow, 1974-1978: associate attorney, tax and corporate departments, specializing in employee benefits
- Boston University School of Law: associate professor of law 1978–1980
- Cornell University: associate professor of law, 1980–1982; professor of law, 1982–1988; editor, Law and History Review, 1982–1987; dean and professor of law, 1988 to July 1998
- Grinnell College: twelfth president of Grinnell College, 1998-2010; professor of history and science

== Osgood at Grinnell ==
Osgood's administrative actions at Grinnell revolved around a strategic plan approved by the trustees in Spring 2005. The five-year plan's goals included increasing the emphasis on inquiry-based learning and broadening the curriculum; fostering faculty, student, and staff sense of ambition, adventure, and well-being; advancing Grinnell College as a more diverse, robust intellectual community; improving the fiscal balance and stability of the college; contributing to the vitality of the city of Grinnell; and strengthening the public profile of Grinnell College, Grinnellians, and the value of a Grinnell education. The Grinnell campus underwent much construction and renovation in the 2000s. Though the plans began during the tenure of the previous president, Pamela Ferguson, many of the projects occurred under Osgood. World-renowned architect Cesar Pelli designed several of the recent buildings.

Osgood stepped down from his post as president of Grinnell, effective July 31, 2010. The Board of Trustees later chose Raynard S. Kington as Osgood's successor. Reflecting on his experiences teaching both undergraduates and law students, Osgood said he "enjoyed interacting with law students as a teacher and dean, but he says he enjoys undergraduates more. 'I like law students,' he says, 'but they're much more developed and formed. Undergraduates are still making fundamental choices in their life. It’s more interesting to interact with them.'"

In January 2011, Osgood was named a semi-finalist for the position of Dean of the Boston College Law School.

== Personal life ==
Osgood is married, with four grown children and three dogs.

Osgood is a runner, and students and faculty have reported seeing him jogging at very early hours in short, red swimsuits. "I have about 15 pairs of bathing suits," Osgood said, "About half of them are red. I don’t know why I have 15. If you see me around my house at night, you’ll see me wearing them. I just wear them as shorts. Not just for running purposes—I wear them when I fly on planes.”

== Books by Russell K. Osgood ==
Cases and Materials on Employee Benefits. with Peter J. Wiedenbeck, Washington University in St. Louis

The Law in Massachusetts. The Supreme Judicial Court 1692-1992, Editor and Contributor, 1992, Supreme Judicial Court Historical Society

The Law of Pensions and Profit-Sharing. Qualified Retirement Plans and Other Deferred Compensation Arrangements (1984, Little Brown) with Supplements.
