= Cornell gorge suicides =

Phenomenon of suicides at Cornell University

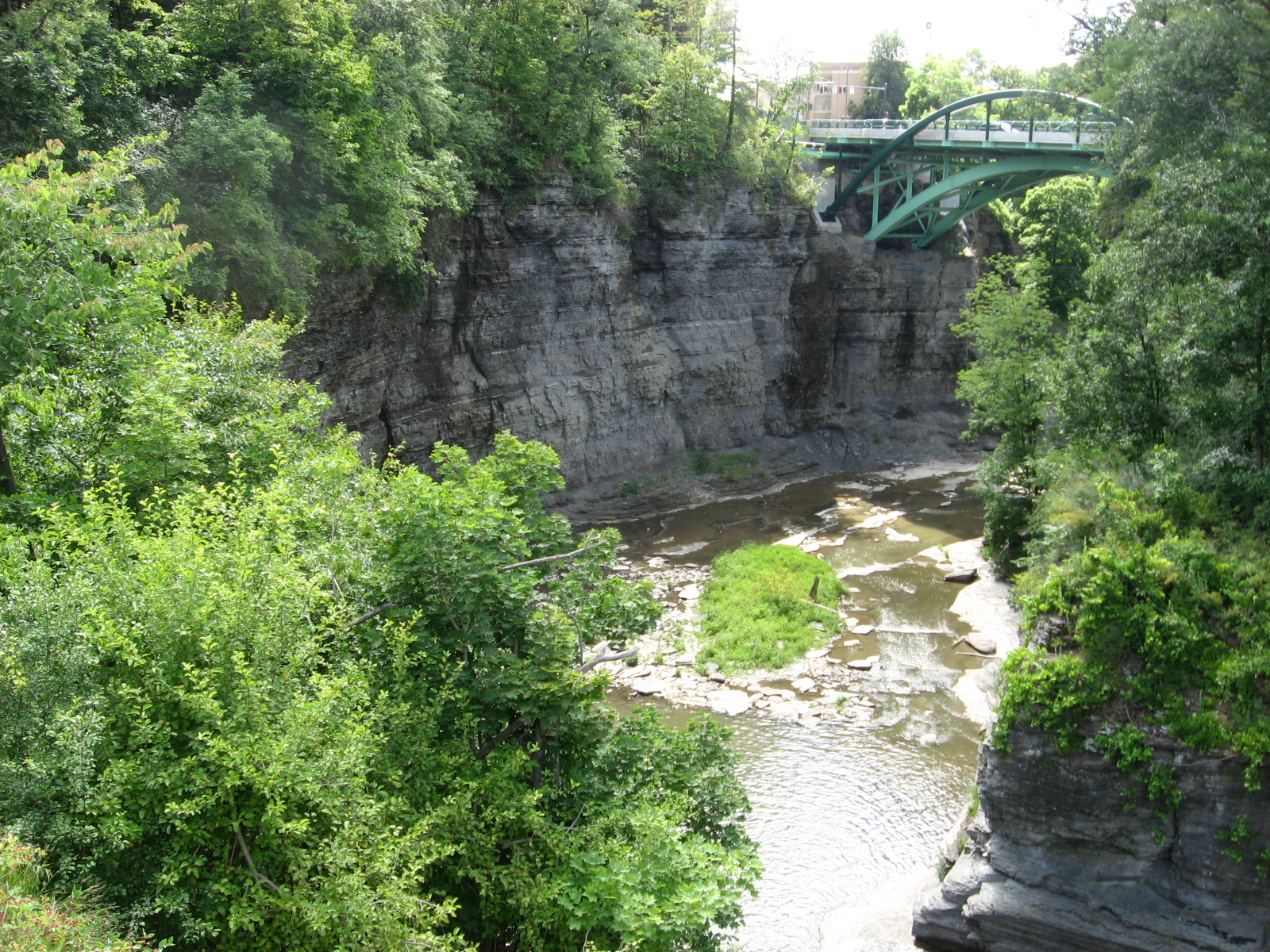
Cornell's Thurston Avenue Bridge in 2009

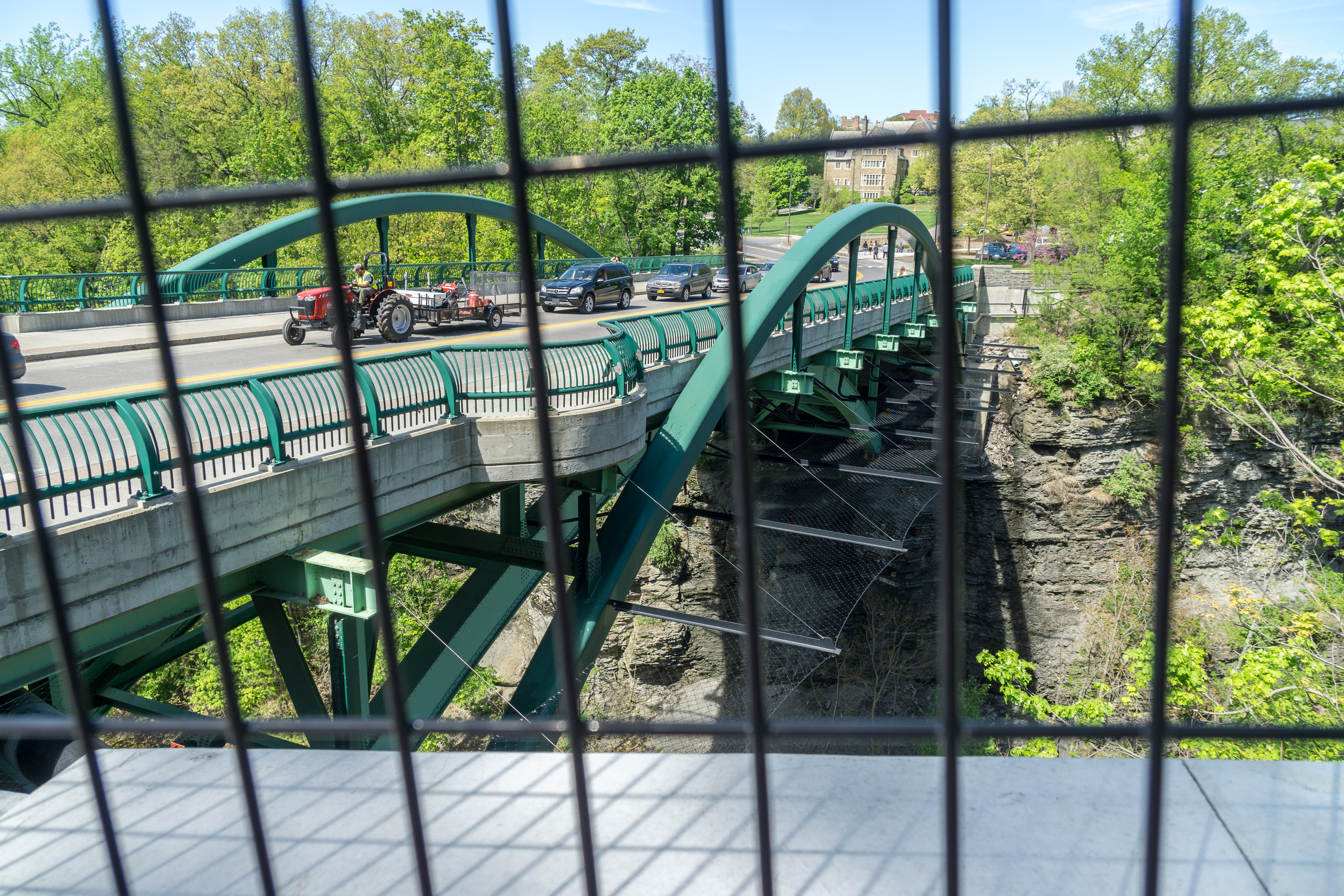
The same bridge in 2018, after installation of suicide nets

Suicides from jumping into the gorges across Cornell University's Ithaca campus have occurred since at least 1934. There was a high-profile cluster of six suicides in the 2009–2010 school year. Following this, Cornell installed nets on several bridges around campus.

== History ==
A suicide by jumping into a gorge at Cornell occurred as early as 1934.

An investigation by Cornell University alumnus Rob Fishman, writing in The Huffington Post, found that multiple suicides had occurred in the 1970s and 1990s. Between 1991 and 1994, five students died by suicide in the gorges.

The half-dozen suicides in the 2009–2010 academic year marked the first instances of student suicides at Cornell since 2005. Stepped-up efforts to help students with mental health issues began in 2002 and intensified after David J. Skorton became Cornell's president in 2006. New fences were set up following the 2010 gorge suicides. Cornell indicated that it planned to set up nets on five of the university's bridges, which will extend out 15 feet. Installation of the nets began in May 2013 and were completed over the summer. Between 1990 and 2010, 27 people, including 15 Cornell students, had died by suicide via bridge-jumping in Ithaca.

The first survivor of a fall from the infamous Thurston Avenue bridge was Derek McCarthy, who attempted suicide on the night of October 21, 1991. Having recovered sufficiently from his injuries, McCarthy returned to Cornell in May 1992 and completed his undergraduate degree in December 1992.

Despite the gorge suicides, Cornell allegedly does not have an above-average suicide rate compared to other colleges. The misperception of a high suicide rate has been attributed by some to the public nature of suicides in the gorges.
