= Barbara J. Wilson =

American academic (born 1957)

Barbara Wilson

22nd President of the University of Iowa
- Incumbent
- Assumed office July 15, 2021
- Preceded by: Bruce Harreld

Chancellor of the University of Illinois, Urbana-Champaign
- Acting
- In office September 10, 2015 – September 25, 2016
- Preceded by: Phyllis Wise
- Succeeded by: Robert J. Jones

Personal details
- Born: November 27, 1957 (age 68) Appleton, Wisconsin, U.S.
- Education: University of Wisconsin, Madison (BA, MA, PhD)

Academic background
- Thesis: Visual Exposure and Verbal Explanation Components of a Desensitization Procedure to Reduce Children’s Fear Reactions to Mass Media: A Developmental Study (1985)
- Doctoral advisor: Joanne Cantor

Academic work
- Discipline: Communications
- Institutions: University of Louisville; University of California, Santa Barbara; University of Illinois, Urbana-Champaign; University of Iowa

Barbara J. Wilson (born November 27, 1957) is an American academic who has served as the 22nd president of the University of Iowa since July 15, 2021. She previously was provost of the University of Illinois system.

== Early life and education ==
Wilson was born on November 27, 1957, in Appleton, Wisconsin. She earned her bachelor's degree in 1979 studying journalism at the University of Wisconsin–Madison. She went on to receive a master's degree in 1982 and a doctorate in communications in 1985 from the same university while working under the direction of Joanne Cantor.

== Career ==
After receiving a doctorate degree in 1985, Wilson became an assistant professor at the University of Louisville where her research was focused on the developmental differences in children's cognitive and emotional reactions to mass media. After three years at Louisville, Wilson left for a position at the University of California, Santa Barbara in 1988 and remained there for 12 years.

In 2014, Wilson was appointed dean of College of Liberal Arts and Sciences at University of Illinois Urbana-Champaign.

In 2015, Wilson was named acting chancellor for University of Illinois Urbana-Champaign while the campus searches for a replacement for outgoing chancellor Phyllis M. Wise.

In 2016, Wilson was appointed executive vice president for the University of Illinois System.

On July 15, 2021, Wilson was named the 22nd president of the University of Iowa.

Academic offices
Preceded by Phyllis Wise	Chancellor of the University of Illinois at Urbana-Champaign; 2015–2016; Acting	Succeeded by Robert J. Jones
Preceded by Bruce Harreld	22nd President of the University of Iowa; 2021 – present	Incumbent
