= Association of American Medical Colleges =

Nonprofit organization

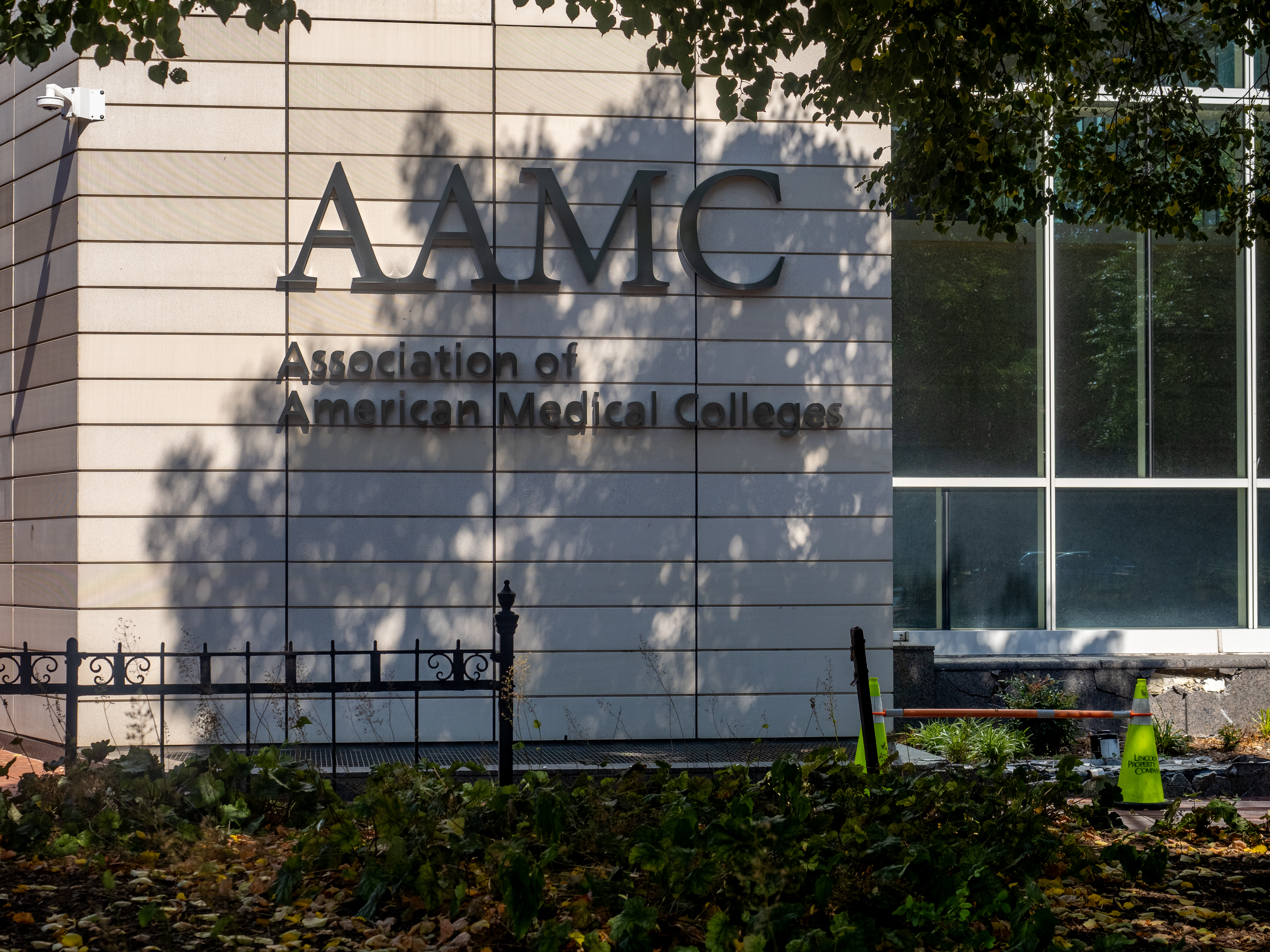
- Founded: June 1876; 150 years ago
- Type: 501(c)(3)
- Legal status: Nonprofit organization
- Purpose: To strengthen the world's most advanced medical care by supporting education, research, and patient care activities conducted by its member institutions.
- Location: Washington, D.C.
- Coordinates: 38.9025287°N 77.0209447°W
- Key people: David J. Skorton _{(President and CEO, 2019–present)}, LouAnn Woodward, MD _{(Chair of the Board of Directors, 2022–2023)}
- Website: www.aamc.org

The Association of American Medical Colleges (AAMC) is a 501(c)(3) nonprofit organization based in Washington, D.C. that was established in June 1876. It represents medical schools, teaching hospitals, and academic and scientific societies, while providing services to its member institutions that include data from medical, education, and health studies, as well as consulting. The AAMC administers the Medical College Admission Test and operates the American Medical College Application Service and the Electronic Residency Application Service. Along with the American Medical Association (AMA), the AAMC co-sponsors the Liaison Committee on Medical Education (LCME), the accrediting body for all U.S. MD-granting medical education programs.

== History ==
The AAMC was founded in 1876 at Jefferson Medical College in Philadelphia to establish standards for member medical schools. The first meeting was held on June 2, 1876, and included members from 22 medical colleges. Jefferson Medical College's Dean, John B. Biddle, was the first president of the Association. The first set of standards established in 1876 included "a curriculum of two terms not occurring in the same year."

By 1905, the Association expanded its standards to require member schools to offer a four-year medical curriculum of no less than 4,000 hours.

In 1942, the AAMC partnered with the American Medical Association's (AMA) Council on Medical Education and Hospitals to form the Liaison Committee on Medical Education (LCME). The LCME is an accrediting agency for educational programs at medical schools in the United States and Canada.

In 2006, Darrell G. Kirch became president and CEO of AAMC, he served until 2019. On July 15, 2019, David J. Skorton replaced Kirch as president and CEO.

In 2015, the AAMC announced MCAT examinees with documented disabilities would no longer be required to inform schools if they received accommodations during their exam. Prior to this, if someone received accommodations due to a documented disability, an asterisk was affixed to the score report to inform all schools the individual applied to. The schools were not informed of the specific disability or nature of the accommodations.

In response to the COVID-19 pandemic in 2020, the AAMC created a database of treatment and management guidance for clinicians. The resources are divided into various topics, including infection control, emergency department, inpatient, ambulatory, serious illness communication, mental health, and special populations. The AAMC also recommended that medical schools temporarily suspend medical students' direct patient contact due to safety concerns.

Throughout 2020, the AAMC was criticized for continuing to hold the MCAT exam in person during the COVID pandemic. In October 2020, the Association responded to lawmaker's concerns over in-person testing by saying it had resumed only when safety protocols had been developed and implemented.

In 2020, the AAMC removed Abraham Flexner's name from their annual award, claiming his 1910 report contained "racist and sexist" statements. This claim, however, has been challenged.

== Structure ==
The Association is a nonprofit organization that represents medical schools, teaching hospitals, and academic and scientific societies. All accredited MD-granting medical schools in the United States and Canada are members of the AAMC. Membership also includes teaching hospitals or health systems, including 51 Department of Veterans Affairs medical centers, and academic societies are also members.

The AAMC provides services including data from medical, education, and health studies, as well as consulting. The organization hosts events each year that offer continuing medical education and professional development to the health workforce.

The Association is governed by a 17-member board of directors. Ten of the board members are the chairs of the Association's three member councils: the Council of Deans, the Council of Teaching Hospitals and Health Systems, and the Council of Faculty and Academic Societies. The remaining 7 include a medical student, a resident physician, and a member of the public not affiliated with the AAMC, a medical school, or a teaching hospital.

The Council of Faculty and Academic Societies has 94 member professional organizations. Members consist of faculty from U.S. medical schools and teaching hospitals.

The Council of Teaching Hospitals and Health Systems is composed of around 400 teaching hospitals, including Veteran Affairs medical centers.

The Council of Deans is composed of deans from all accredited medical schools in the U.S. and 17 Canadian schools.

In January 2022, the Association of American Medical Colleges and the Association of Academic Health Centers (AAHC) approved a merger agreement. Under the agreement, the AAHC joined the AAMC on April 1, 2022, according to a Jan. 20 joint news release. The AAHC was founded in 1969 and lists over 120 U.S. and international member organizations on its website. The latter are part of the Association of Academic Health Centers International (AAHCI), a subsidiary of the U.S. organization founded in 2008.

== Programs ==
The AAMC administers the Medical College Admission Test and operates the American Medical College Application Service and the Electronic Residency Application Service, which facilitate students applying to medical schools and residency programs.

=== Medical College Admission Test (MCAT) ===
The MCAT was formed in 1928 and was known as the "Scholastic Aptitude Test for Medical Students". In 1948, it was renamed the "Medical College Admission Test". In 2015, after a review process, a new version of the test was introduced by the AAMC. The new exam added a Psychological, Social, and Biological Foundations of Behavior section.

The review for the new exam was led by a 21-member committee composed by the Association and called the MR5 Committee. The MR5 Committee consisted of medical school deans; admissions, educational affairs, student affairs, and diversity officers; basic science and clinical faculty; pre-health advisors and undergraduate faculty; and a medical student and a physician resident. The MR5 Committee also reached out to subcommittees of experts in fields such as psychology, sociology, and anthropology.

The Association maintains a "What's on the MCAT Exam?" webpage that includes a comprehensive list of all tested topics. They also offer a Fee Assistance Program for test takers who require financial aid in order to take the MCAT.

=== American Medical College Application Service (AMCAS) ===
Led by the AAMC, the American Medical College Application Service (AMCAS) administers and processes medical school applications. Most U.S. medical schools participate in the AMCAS.

AMCAS was first used by applicants to medical schools in 1969.

=== Electronic Residency Application Service (ERAS) ===
The AAMC developed the Electronic Residency Application Service (ERAS) to allow final-year medical school students and graduates to apply electronically for residency positions. The service was established in 1996.

== Resources and data ==
The Association conducts studies, research, and publications on medical education, health care, and biomedical research and provides publications and forums to support medical education and educational health programs. The Association is also responsible for a number of publications, including:

- The State Physician Workforce Data Report: published annually. The report looks at physician supply, medical students, and graduate medical education residents in each state. It also provides data on the breakdown of physicians by specialty and training location.
- The Medical School Admissions Requirements (MSAR): this publication includes a description of each medical school, and the median overall and science GPAs and MCATs of the first year class. The AAMC has received criticism due to charging for the MSAR. Because the MSAR contains data crucial to all those applying to medical school, critics say this practice contradicts AAMC's official mission of making medical education available to all regardless of income.
- The Medical School Enrollment Survey: published annually
- The Report on Medical School Faculty Salaries: provides summary tables with average compensation and percentile statistics by rank and department for basic and clinical science faculty. Additional tables summarize the data by type of school and region.
- The Complexities of Physician Supply and Demand: projections from 2017 to 2032

The AAMC published a three-part report on conflicts of interest in research and medical education settings. The final report was titled "In the Interest of Patients: Recommendations for Physician Financial Relationships and Clinical Decision Making," and was released in 2010.

The AAMC publishes the peer-reviewed journal Academic Medicine. Past papers of the association are held at the National Library of Medicine.

== See also ==
- Accreditation Council for Graduate Medical Education
- American Medical Association
- Liaison Committee on Medical Education
