= Oliver M. Spencer =

Third President of the University of Iowa

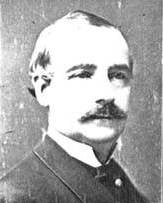

Oliver M. Spencer (1829 – July 27, 1895) was the third president of the University of Iowa, serving from 1862 to 1867. He was a professor of chemistry and natural philosophy, and continued teaching during his tenure. In 1866, he took a leave of absence to serve as United States Consul in Genoa, where he decided to remain, and resigned his office the following year.

Academic offices
| Preceded by Silas Totten | President of the University of Iowa; 1862–1867 | Succeeded by Nathan Ransom Leonard (acting); James Black |
