= Nathan Ransom Leonard =

American academic administrator

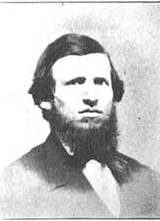
- Born: Columbus
- Died: July 8, 1917; Butte
- Resting place: Mount Moriah Cemetery

Nathan Ransom Leonard (November 29, 1832 – July 8, 1917) was an acting president of the University of Iowa, serving first from 1867 to 1868 and again from 1870 to 1871.

== Biography ==
Nathan R. Leonard was born in Columbus, Ohio in 1832.

He married Elizabeth Heizer in 1853, and they had five children.

Leonard died at his home in Butte, Montana on July 8, 1917.

Academic offices
Preceded by Oliver M. Spencer	Acting President of the University of Iowa; 1867–1868	Succeeded by James Black
Preceded by James Black	Acting President of the University of Iowa; 1870–1871	Succeeded by George Thacher
