= Duane C. Spriestersbach =

Duane Caryl Spriestersbach (September 5, 1916 – April 25, 2011) was an acting President of the University of Iowa, serving from 1981 to 1982.

== Academic career ==
Spriesterbach graduated from Winona State University in 1939, and received his MA in 1940 and his Ph.D. in 1948 from the University of Iowa (UI). From 1948 to 1989 he was Professor of Speech Pathology and Audiology at UI. He specialized in the area of cleft lip and palates. He wrote many articles and books on the subject. Spriesterbach served as dean of the UI Graduate College from 1965 to 1989 and served both as vice president for research and as vice president for educational research and development, before serving as the acting president.

He was known for being able to tackle any problem assigned to him and for being a friend to students. He helped transform research by creating "centers" that organized research across department and college lines.

== Private life ==
Nicknamed "Sprie", Duane Caryl Spriestersbach was born on September 5, 1916, in Pine Island, MN, the son of Esther (née Stucky) and Merle Spriestersbach. He had two sisters, Beverly and Gretchen. He married Bette Rae Bartelt in 1946 and they had a son and a daughter. During World War II Spriestersbach was in the 13th Armored Division and was awarded a Bronze Star. He stayed in the United States Army Reserve after the war retiring as a lieutenant colonel. Spriestersbach died on April 25, 2011, at Mercy Hospital in Iowa City.

== D.C. Spriestersbach Dissertation Prize ==
The D.C. Spriestersbach Dissertation Prize is an academic award established in May 1981 to recognize outstanding doctoral research at the University of Iowa. Each year, recipients of the prize are eligible to serve as the university’s nominees for the national Distinguished Dissertation Award, administered by the Council of Graduate Schools in partnership with University Microfilms International.

The prize is awarded annually across rotating disciplinary areas, and currently includes a $5000 monetary award. These disciplinary areas include the humanities and fine arts; mathematical and physical sciences and engineering; biological and life sciences; and social sciences. In alignment with the categories specified by the Council of Graduate Schools, the university’s Graduate College conducts two D.C. Spriestersbach Prize competitions each year within the designated fields.

Academic offices
| Preceded by Willard L. Boyd | Acting President of the University of Iowa; 1981–1982 | Succeeded by James O. Freedman |
