= Howard Bowen =

American economist

Howard Rothmann Bowen
- Born: October 27, 1908
- Died: December 22, 1989 (aged 81)
- Occupations: Economist and college president
- Employer(s): Grinnell College, University of Iowa, Claremont Graduate University
- Notable work: Bowen's Law

Howard Rothmann Bowen (October 27, 1908 – December 22, 1989) was an American economist and college president. He served as the 7th president of Grinnell College from 1955 to 1964 and as the fourteenth president of the University of Iowa from 1964 to 1969. Bowen then served as president of Claremont Graduate University from 1970 to 1971. He is remembered for the formulation of "Bowen's law," a description of spending in higher education.

== Biography ==
=== Early life and education ===
Bowen was born in Spokane, Washington. He earned both his Bachelor of Arts degree and Master of Arts degree Washington State University in 1929 and 1933 respectively. He did his doctoral studies at the University of Iowa and received his Ph.D. in 1935. Bowen then went on to pursue his postdoctoral study at the University of Cambridge, England, and the London School of Economics from 1937 to 1938.

=== Marriage and children ===
He married Lois B. Schilling of Green Bay, Wisconsin, in 1935. The couple had two sons.

=== Career ===
Howard Bowen's career began at the University of Iowa where he taught economics from 1935 to 1942, before he decided to make a career change. He was chief economist of the Joint Congressional Committee on Internal Revenue Taxation from 1944 to 1945 and economist for the Irving Trust Company, a Wall Street bank, from 1945 to 1947.

After serving the government for a few years, Bowen decided to return to education. His first job back into education was at the University of Illinois. At Illinois, he was appointed dean of the College of Commerce in 1947. Howard Bowen's tenure at Illinois was a good one with improvements in many different programs. In 1950, Bowen had to resign from the University of Illinois because senior professionals did not like his curriculum on the social responsibility of businessmen and, as an example of McCarthyism, accused him of being anti-business. However, McCarthy didn't hold his first congressional inquiry until 1953 so this terminology is being applied retroactively.

Howard Bowen loved higher education so much that, despite his problems at the University of Illinois, he decided to teach economics at Williams College in Massachusetts. Many scholars regard Howard as a founding father of the research of corporate social responsibility, mainly because of his 1953 book "Social Responsibilities of the Businessman". Bowen loved this job but enjoyed administration more, so he then went to Grinnell College in Iowa. While serving as Grinnell president, he increased enrollment, quality of students and faculty, and endowment to national stature. After making such great improvements at Grinnell the State University of Iowa wanted him to work for them. The State University of Iowa hired Bowen in 1964 to be president of the college. Howard Bowen made a great accomplishment by going to the legislature in Iowa and convincing them to change the university's name to the University of Iowa. He was president there during student uprisings and anti-war demonstrations in the late 1960s.

==== Bowen's Law ====
The last job Howard Bowen ever took was as the R. Stanton Avery Professor of Economics and Education at Claremont Graduate University. Bowen also served as CGU president for one year. During his tenure from 1974 to 1984 Bowen published three important writings: Investment in Learning, Costs of Higher Education, and American Professors: A National Resource Imperiled.

Costs of Higher Education is best known for Bowen's Revenue Theory of Costs, sometimes called Bowen's Law:

...at any given time, the unit cost of education is determined by the amount of revenues currently available for education relative to enrollment. The statement is more than a tautology, as it expresses the fundamental fact that unit cost [i.e., the cost of education] is determined by hard dollars of revenue and only indirectly and distantly by considerations of need, technology, efficiency, and market wages and prices. (p. 19)

Bowen's book provided plentiful evidence that higher education institutions of similar size, situation and repute had radically different costs per student, and spent each dollar differently from one another. Their different costs were a function of their different histories in raising money.

=== Death and afterward ===
Howard Bowen died on December 22, 1989. The Association for the Study of Higher Education has given an award in his name, the Howard R. Bowen Distinguished Career Award, annually since 1991. There are annual Howard Bowen Lectures at the Tippie College of Business and Claremont Graduate University. The Bowen Science Building at the University of Iowa is named after him.

== Published works ==
- Toward Social Economy (1948)
- Social Responsibilities of the Businessman (1953)
- The Business Enterprise as a Subject for Research (1955)
- Automation and Economic Progress (1966)
- Technology and Employment (1966)
- The Finance of Higher Education (1968)
- Efficiency in Liberal Education (1971)
- Who Benefits from Higher Education--and Who Should Pay? (1972)
- Evaluating Institutions for Accountability (1974)
- Investment in Learning (1977)
- The Costs of Higher Education (1980)
- The State of the Nation and the Agenda for Higher Education (1982)
- American Professors: A National Resource Imperiled (1986)
- Academic Recollections (1988)

== Awards ==
- 1965: Regents' Distinguished Alumnus Award, Washington State University
- 1983: Frederic W. Ness Book Award, Association of American Colleges and Universities (for The State of the Nation and the Agenda for Higher Education)
- 1985: Distinguished Service to Education Award, Council for Advancement and Support of Education

Academic offices
Preceded by Virgil Melvin Hancher	President of the University of Iowa; 1964–1969	Succeeded by Willard L. Boyd
