= James Black (educator) =

President of University of Iowa (1868-1870)

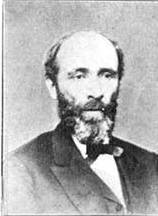
- Died: December 23, 1890; Wooster, Ohio, U.S.
- Children: 1

Academic background
- Education: Western Theological Seminary

James Black (April 27, 1826 – December 23, 1890) was the fourth President of the University of Iowa, serving from 1868 to 1870.

== Early life and education ==
James Black was educated at Washington College and the Western Theological Seminary in Pennsylvania.

== Career ==
From 1855 until 1868, he was vice president and professor of Greek at Washington College. He then served as president of the University of Iowa for two years, before becoming president of the Pennsylvania Female College. In 1875, he began serving as vice president and professor of Greek at the University of Wooster.

== Personal life ==
Black was married and had at least one child, a daughter. He died on December 23, 1890.

Academic offices
Preceded by Nathan Ransom Leonard (acting); Oliver M. Spencer	President of the University of Iowa; 1868–1870	Succeeded by Nathan Ransom Leonard (acting); George Thacher
