= Silas Totten =

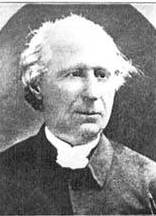
- Born: 26 March 1804
- Died: 7 October 1873 (aged 69)

Silas Totten (March 26, 1804 – October 7, 1873) was an American academic and college president.

He served as the third President of Trinity College from 1837 to 1848. He then served as Professor of Moral and Intellectual Philosophy at the College of William and Mary in Virginia from 1849 to 1859. He was the second President of the University of Iowa, serving from 1859 to 1862.

Academic offices
Preceded by Amos Dean	President of the University of Iowa; 1859–1862	Succeeded by Oliver M. Spencer
