= Jean Robillard =

Vice president and dean at University of Iowa

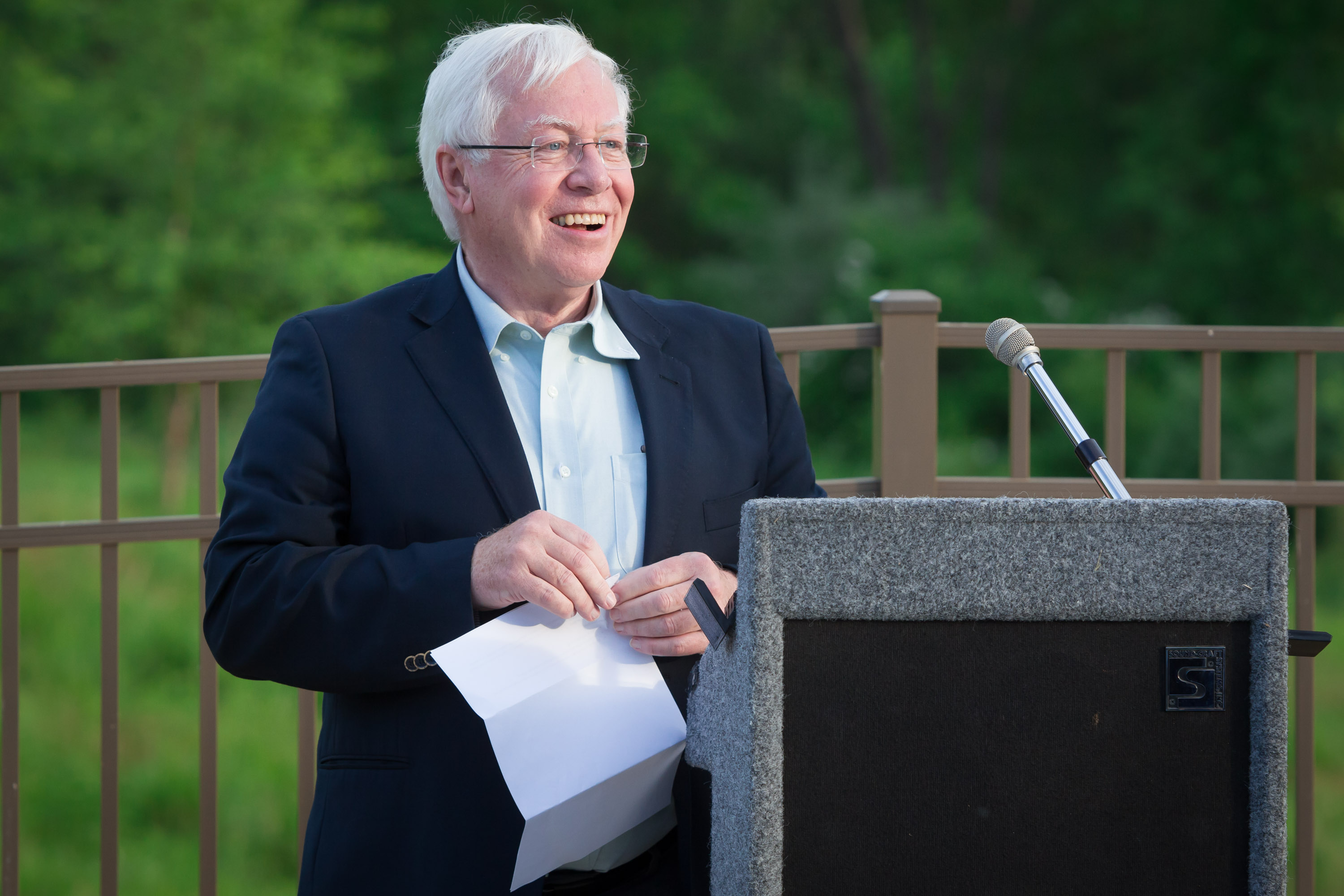

Jean Robillard is a Canadian doctor and academic administrator, currently serving as the Vice President for Medical Affairs at the University of Iowa. He is also the dean of the Roy J. and Lucille A. Carver College of Medicine. Following the retirement of Sally Mason, he served as the interim president from August to November 2015 before Bruce Harreld took over.

A pediatric nephrologist, he earned bachelor’s and medical degrees from the Université de Montréal.

Academic offices
Preceded by Sally Mason	President of the University of Iowa (Interim); 2015	Succeeded by Bruce Harreld
