= Amos Dean =

First President of the University of Iowa (1803–1868)

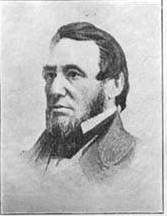

1st President of the University of Iowa
- In office 1855–1859
- Preceded by: Office created
- Succeeded by: Silas Totten

Personal details
- Born: January 16, 1803 Barnard, Vermont
- Died: January 26, 1868 (aged 65)
- Education: Union College

Amos Dean (January 16, 1803 – January 26, 1868) was an American academic administrator and attorney who served as the first president of the University of Iowa, serving from 1855 to 1859.

Dean was born in Barnard, Vermont. He attended Union College and later practiced law in Upstate New York.

Academic offices
Preceded by Office created	President of the University of Iowa; 1855–1859	Succeeded by Silas Totten
