= David J. Skorton =

American physician and academic

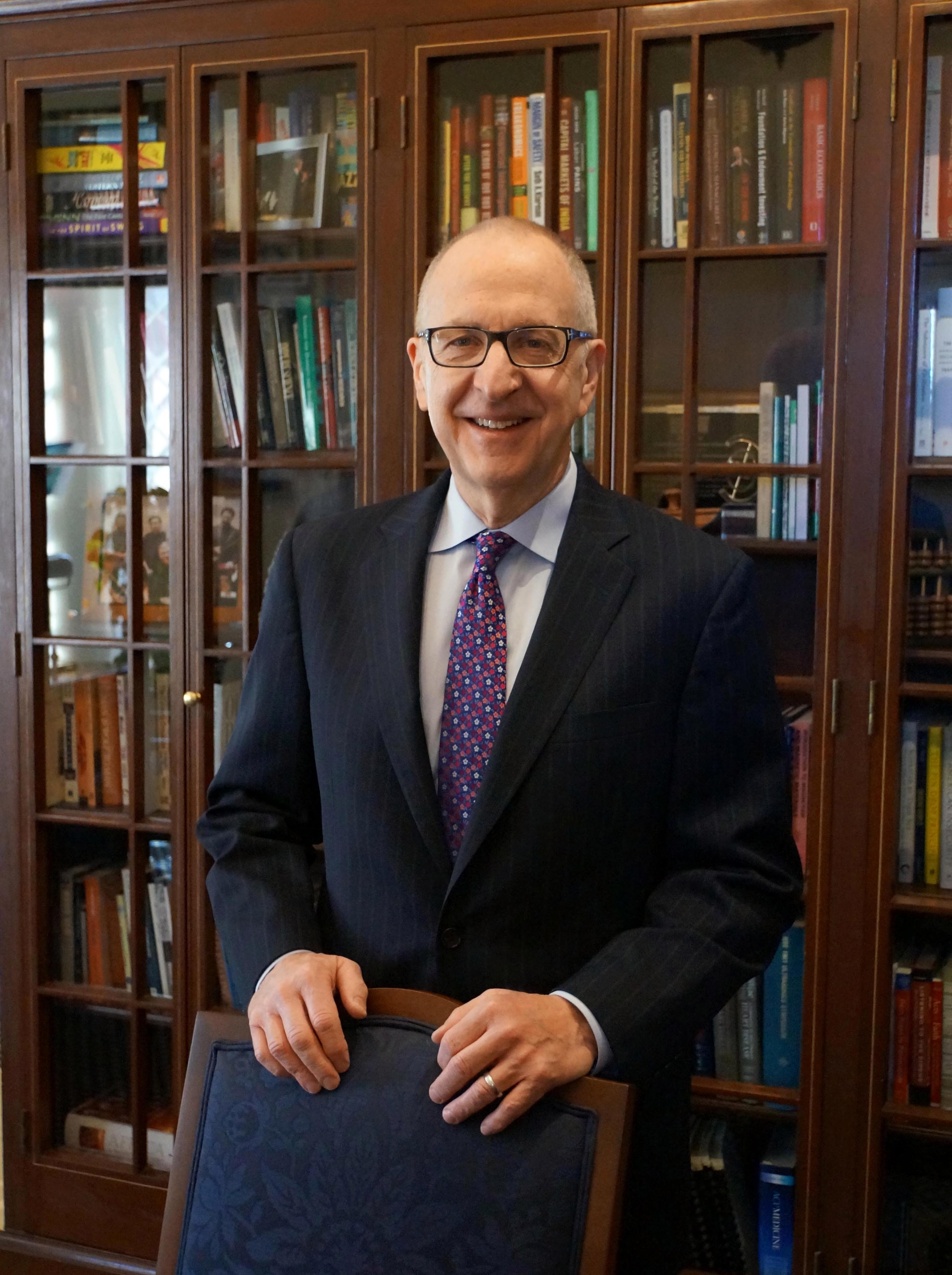

5th President and CEO of the Association of American Medical Colleges
- Incumbent
- Assumed office July 15, 2019
- Preceded by: Darrell Kirch

13th Secretary of the Smithsonian Institution
- In office July 1, 2015 – June 15, 2019
- Preceded by: G. Wayne Clough
- Succeeded by: Lonnie Bunch

12th President of Cornell University
- In office July 1, 2006 – June 30, 2015
- Preceded by: Jeffrey S. Lehman
- Succeeded by: Elizabeth Garrett

19th President of the University of Iowa
- In office March 1, 2003 – June 30, 2006
- Preceded by: Mary Sue Coleman
- Succeeded by: Sally Mason

Personal details
- Born: David Jan Skorton; 1949 (age 76–77)
- Spouse: Robin L. Davisson
- Education: Northwestern University (BS, MD)

Academic work
- Discipline: Biomedical engineering
- Institutions: University of Iowa; Cornell University

David Jan Skorton is an American physician and academic. He has been president and chief executive officer of the Association of American Medical Colleges (AAMC) since July 15, 2019. Prior to the AAMC, he led the Smithsonian Institution, as its 13th Secretary from July 2015 to June 2019. A cardiologist, he was president of Cornell University from 2006 to 2015. Before arriving at Cornell, he served as president of the University of Iowa, where he had been a longtime professor and then vice president. He began his career as a professor of medicine and engineering. He was the first physician to serve as president of the Smithsonian Institution.

== Education ==
Skorton studied at the University of California, Los Angeles before transferring to Northwestern University, where he was awarded a bachelor's degree in psychology in 1970 and an M.D. in 1974. He completed his medical residency and fellowship in cardiology at UCLA, where he also served as chief medical resident.

== University of Iowa ==
Skorton began his career in Iowa in 1980, when he became an instructor at the University of Iowa. In 1981, he was named an assistant professor in internal medicine, and in 1982 he became an assistant professor in electrical and computer engineering. While at the University of Iowa, he also served as vice president for research and vice president for external relations. Skorton was selected to serve the state as the 19th president of the university. He was appointed by the Board of Regents on January 5, 2003, and he served until 2006.

== Cornell University ==
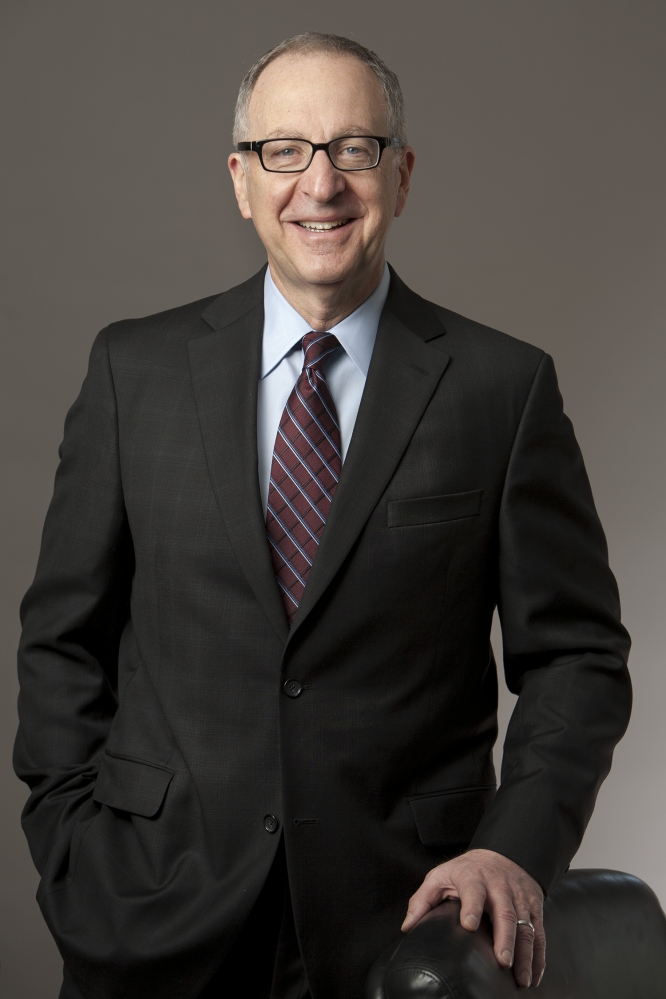
Skorton's official portrait

Skorton was named as the 12th president of Cornell University on January 21, 2006. He stayed at the University of Iowa for the duration of the 2006 spring semester and officially assumed the Cornell presidency on July 1, 2006. His inauguration occurred on September 7, 2006. In celebration of the occasion, the Cornell Dairy unveiled a new flavor of ice cream, "Banana-Berry Skorton." In 2014 Cornell announced that he would be departing to join the Smithsonian Institution, with his final day as president being June 30, 2015.

Skorton has been cited as one factor in increased donations to the university. During his tenure as president, Cornell's capital campaign raised over $4 billion in six years' time.

According to Cornell University, Skorton's base salary as president was $686,683 for 2009–2010. Skorton held two academic positions while serving as president: a professor of pediatrics and internal medicine at Weill Cornell Medical College in New York City, and a professor of biomedical engineering at Cornell's College of Engineering on the Ithaca campus.

=== Education reform ===
Skorton chaired the Business-Higher Education Forum and the Task Force on Diversifying the New York State Economy through Industry-Higher Education Partnerships. He established a University Diversity Council at Cornell University in 2006 and presently serves as its co-chair. He also writes monthly guest columns for the independent student newspaper, The Cornell Daily Sun, a bi-monthly column for the Cornell Alumni Magazine, and blogs for Forbes.com and the Huffington Post. Skorton also spearheaded the Reimagining Cornell initiative.

=== Cornell NYC Tech ===
In 2011, Skorton led Cornell's effort to build a new applied sciences campus in New York City, in response to a competition designed by Mayor Michael Bloomberg to boost the city's technology startup sector. In partnership with the Technion - Israel Institute of Technology, Cornell was selected as the competition's winner on December 19, 2011. In exchange for free land and $100 million for infrastructure upgrades, Cornell promised to invest over $2 billion in the new campus, called Cornell NYC Tech, over the next three decades.

Construction of the campus began in 2014 on the site of the Goldwater Hospital Campus on Roosevelt Island. On May 21, 2012, Skorton appeared at Google's New York headquarters to announce that the tech company would donate up to 58,000 square feet of space to house Cornell NYC Tech until the campus opened on Roosevelt Island in 2017.

==== Immigration reform ====
Skorton was a proponent of immigration reform, testifying on behalf of the Association of American Universities before the Senate Judiciary Committee's Subcommittee on Immigration, Refugees, and Border Security in support of the DREAM Act and specifically to allow more skilled immigrants to live and work in the United States.

==== Higher education finances ====
Skorton argued that preserving college affordability must be a major priority of universities and Congress. Cornell substantially increased need-based financial aid under his tenure to off-set tuition increases.

==== Greek life and hazing ====
Skorton took national public positions on fraternity hazing and suicide prevention. Skorton pledged to end hazing in the fraternity and sorority system, and wrote an op-ed on the topic in The New York Times.

==== Suicide prevention ====
In 2010, Skorton responded to three student suicides by speaking out nationally for suicide prevention, as well as authorizing the construction of barriers on the bridges over Cornell's gorges and increasing resources for counseling on campus. Skorton also spoke out about the continued importance of the humanities to society. The barriers were removed in favor of nets that were installed under each major bridge, a historically common place for suicides at Cornell.

==== Gun violence ====
Skorton joined eight other University presidents in signing a statement addressing gun violence in January 2013. The document called for the United States to "confront its culture of violence, particularly violence perpetrated by guns."

== Smithsonian Institution ==
Skorton became the 13th Secretary of the Smithsonian Institution on July 1, 2015. During his tenure the Smithsonian opened the National Museum of African American History and Culture, its first new facility on the National Mall since the opening of the National Museum of the American Indian in 2004.

He was elected a member of the American Philosophical Society in 2017.

In December 2018, the Smithsonian announced that Skorton would be leaving his position in June 2019 to become president and CEO of the Association of American Medical Colleges. Lonnie Bunch, director of the African American History Museum, succeeded Skorton and became the 14th Secretary on June 16, 2019.

== Association of American Medical Colleges ==
David Skorton is president and CEO of the Association of American Medical Colleges (AAMC), a non-profit organization based in Washington, D.C.

=== Diversity, equity, and inclusion ===
When he assumed the presidency of the AAMC, Skorton said he would focus on three challenges: diversity, equity, and inclusion (DEI); mental health and substance use disorders; and access and affordability of care.

In November 2019, he wrote an op-ed for The Washington Post that called for the Supreme Court to consider the negative effects that would result from deporting the approximately 27,000 healthcare workers with DACA status. This was just before the Supreme Court began its DACA hearings. In June 2020, when the Supreme Court ruled that DACA could not be ended, Skorton praised the decision, stating that the AAMC was appreciative that the ruling allowed those healthcare workers to continue providing care throughout the U.S.

In January 2020, he issued a call to action to medical schools as the first step in an initiative to improve equity in pay, promotion, and other areas for women. In December 2019, the AAMC released data that showed that, for the first time in history, women comprise the majority of enrolled medical students in the U.S., at 50.5%.

In response to both the COVID-19 pandemic and the impact of structural racism on people in vulnerable communities, Skorton argued that there is a need for a national standardized system for the collection of race and ethnicity data related to the pandemic.

=== Coronavirus response ===
After less than a year in office, Skorton was responsible for leading the AAMC's 171 medical schools and over 400 teaching hospitals and systems through the initial phases of the coronavirus pandemic. Throughout 2020, the AAMC was criticized for continuing to hold the MCAT exam in person during the COVID pandemic.

In July 2020, Skorton joined other executives at the AAMC in issuing a statement in support of Dr. Anthony Fauci, the top federal infectious disease official. Later that month, Skorton oversaw the release of a proposed plan to reset the U.S.’s response to the pandemic. The plan consisted of nine immediate actions, such as increasing production of key supplies and establishing national criteria for stay-at-home orders; and two longer-term actions, including broadening health insurance. In August 2020, Skorton released a statement that the AAMC was alarmed at changes to the CDC’s testing guidelines for individuals not showing symptoms of the disease.

== Other work ==
In 2012, Skorton was appointed to the New York Racing Association Reorganizational Board, by then governor Andrew Cuomo along with 16 other public figures "putting in place a temporary, publicly controlled body to transform management of thoroughbred racing in New York State."

In 2020, Skorton was named a volunteer member of the Joe Biden presidential transition Agency Review Team to support transition efforts related to the arts and humanities. Skorton is an avid musician. He once worked as a professional jazz and R&B performer in the Chicago area. He began playing saxophone at age 9 and also plays the flute. He was also co-host of a weekly program, "As Night Falls - Latin Jazz," on KSUI FM, the University of Iowa's public radio station.

== Honors ==
- In 2010, Skorton was elected as a member of the National Academy of Medicine.
- In 2011, Skorton was elected as a member of the American Academy of Arts and Sciences.
- In 2015, Skorton was awarded the Arts and Sciences Advocacy Award from the Council of Colleges of Arts and Sciences.
- In 2017, Skorton was elected as a member of American Philosophical Society.
- Skorton is also a member of the Council on Foreign Relations and a fellow of the American Association for the Advancement of Science.

== Selected publications ==
- Truesdell SC, Skorton DJ, Lauer RM. Life insurance for children with cardiovascular disease. Pediatrics 1986; 77:687-91.
- Collins SM, Skorton DJ, editors. Cardiac Imaging and Image Processing. New York: McGraw-Hill Book Company, 1986.
- Thedens DR, Skorton DJ, Fleagle SR. Methods of graph searching for border detection in image sequences with applications to cardiac magnetic resonance imaging. IEEE Trans Med Imaging 1995; 14:42-55.
- Skorton DJ, editor-in-chief, Brundage BH, Schelbert HR, Wolf GL, eds., Braunwald E, consulting ed. Marcus Cardiac Imaging. 2nd ed. Philadelphia: WB Saunders, 1996.
- Skorton DJ and Davisson R. No Foreign Exchange Devalues Our Universities. The Wall Street Journal: Manager's Journal, August 2, 2005, p. B2.
- Skorton DJ, chair. Task Force on Diversifying the New York State Economy through Industry-Higher Education Partnerships Final Report: Prepared for Governor David A. Paterson. December 14, 2009

Academic offices
Preceded by Mary Sue Coleman	19th President of the University of Iowa; 2002–2006	Succeeded by Sally Mason; Gary Fethke (Interim)
Preceded by Hunter R. Rawlings III; Acting	12th President of Cornell University; 2006–2015	Succeeded by Elizabeth Garrett
Government offices
Preceded by G. Wayne Clough	13th Secretary of the Smithsonian Institution; 2015–2019	Succeeded by Lonnie Bunch
