= Gary Fethke =

American academic (born 1942)

Gary Craig Fethke (born January 16, 1942) was an interim president of the University of Iowa. Fethke succeeded David Skorton, who left the University of Iowa to assume the presidency of Cornell University. Fethke earned both his B.A. and Ph.D. degrees from the University of Iowa. He taught at Bradley University from 1968 to 1974, and at the London School of Economics. He became a management science and economics professor at Iowa. In 1988 Fethke was named an associate dean of the Henry B. Tippie College of Business, and in 1993 he was named the interim dean of the Tippie College. One year later he was named dean.

Fethke served as president from David Skorton's departure in of the University of Iowa in 2006 until August 1, 2007. During his tenure, the Iowa Regents engaged in a difficult and controversial search for a full-time president, finally selecting Sally Mason.

Academic offices
Preceded by David J. Skorton	President of the University of Iowa (Interim); 2006 – August 1, 2007	Succeeded by Sally Mason
