= Sally Mason =

American academic administrator

20th President of The University of Iowa
- In office August 1, 2007 – August 1, 2015
- Preceded by: David J. Skorton
- Succeeded by: Bruce Harreld

Personal details
- Born: May 29, 1950 (age 76) New York
- Spouse: Ken Mason
- Education: University of Kentucky; Purdue University; University of Arizona
- Profession: Biologist

Sally Kay Mason (née Viparina; May 29, 1950) is an American academic administrator. She became the 20th president (and second female president) of the University of Iowa in Iowa City, Iowa, on August 1, 2007. She retired on August 1, 2015.

== Early life and education ==
Mason was born Sally Viparina in New York and grew up in New Jersey. She graduated from the University of Kentucky in 1972 with a Bachelor of Arts degree in zoology, and as such was the first member of her family to graduate from college. She then earned a Master of Science from Purdue University in 1974, followed by a Ph.D. in 1978 from the University of Arizona in cellular, molecular, and developmental biology.

== Career ==
Mason conducted further research at Indiana University before accepting a position at the University of Kansas in 1981. At the University of Kansas, Mason served as an undergraduate teacher and adviser, a full professor in the Department of Molecular Biosciences, an acting chair of the Department of Physiology and Cell Biology, an associate dean in the university's College of Liberal Arts and Sciences, and finally as the dean of that college. Mason then served as the provost of Purdue University from 2001 until 2007.

== Controversy ==
In February 2014, Mason sparked controversy over the issue of campus sexual assault. In an interview published in The Daily Iowan, Mason is quoted as saying that while the goal would be to end all sexual assaults on campus, she ultimately believed that goal to be "probably not a realistic goal, just given human nature." This statement inspired anger and protests from many members of the University of Iowa community, including a coalition of individuals calling themselves "Not in My Nature" calling for an end to the "rape culture on campus" through a zero tolerance policy, funding for prevention, and sexual assault warning e-mails. The activist coalition also asked Mason to apologize for her comments, which she did on February 25, 2014.

Academic offices
Preceded by David J. Skorton; Gary Fethke (interim)	20th President of the University of Iowa; August 1, 2007–August 1, 2015	Succeeded by Jean Robillard (interim); Bruce Harreld
