= Walter Albert Jessup =

Eleventh President of the University of Iowa (1877–1944)

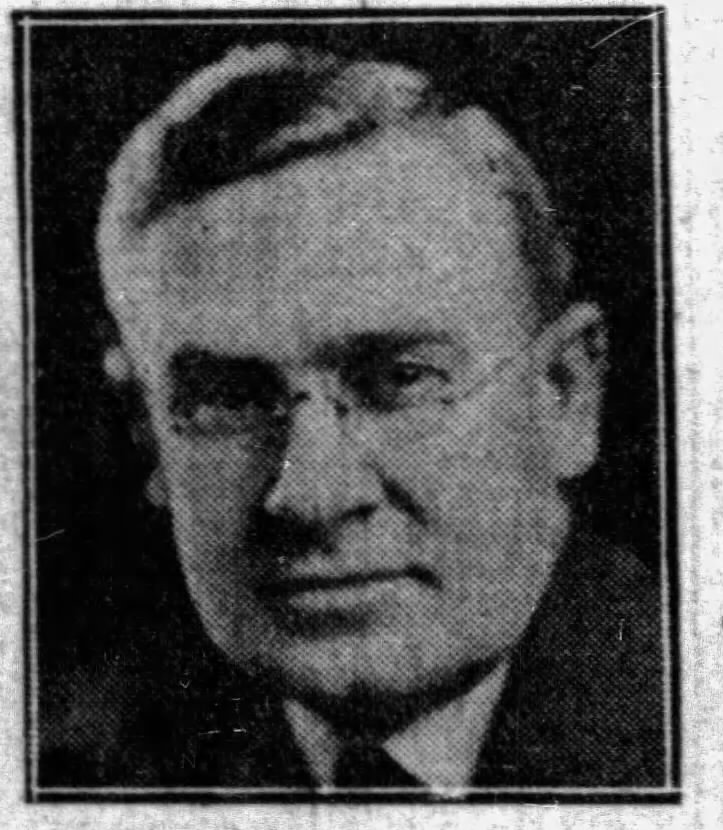
- Jessup in 1929
- Born: August 12, 1877; Richmond, Indiana, U.S.
- Died: July 5, 1944 (aged 66); New York City, U.S.
- Education: Earlham College; Hanover College; Columbia University
- Occupation: Academic administrator

Walter Albert Jessup (August 12, 1877 – July 5, 1944) was an American academic administrator. He served as the eleventh President of the University of Iowa from 1916 to 1934.

== Early life ==
Jessup was born on August 12, 1877, in Richmond, Indiana. He graduated from Earlham College, Hanover College and Columbia University. He was the 28th initiate of the Iowa Gamma chapter of Sigma Phi Epsilon fraternity.

== Career ==
Jessup was the school superintendent in Westfield, Indiana and Madison, Indiana. Jessup served as the dean of the Indiana University School of Education, and as the eleventh President of the University of Iowa from 1916 to 1934.

Jessup was the president of the Carnegie Corporation of New York and the Carnegie Foundation for the Advancement of Teaching.

== Death and legacy ==
Jessup resided in New York City. He summered in Arlington, Vermont.

Jessup died on July 5, 1944, in New York City, at 66. In 1969, University Hall on the university campus was renamed to Jessup Hall in his honor.

Academic offices
Preceded by Thomas Huston Macbride	President of the University of Iowa; 1916–1934	Succeeded by Eugene Allen Gilmore
