= George Thacher =

American academic administrator (1817–1878)

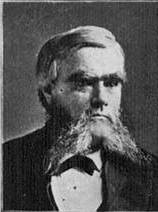
- Portrait of Thacher
- Born: July 25, 1817; Hartford, Connecticut, U.S.
- Died: December 27, 1878 (aged 61); Hartford, Connecticut, U.S.
- Education: Yale College; Yale Divinity School
- Occupations: Pastor; college administrator
- Years active: 1843–1878
- Spouse(s): Sarah M. Smith (m. 1844; died 1850) Mary S. Smith (m. 1851)
- Children: 3
- Relatives: Thomas Anthony Thacher (brother)

George Thacher (July 25, 1817 – December 27, 1878) was the fifth President of the University of Iowa, serving from 1871 to 1877.

== Early life ==
George Thacher was born on July 25, 1817, in Hartford, Connecticut, to Anne (née Parks) and Peter Thacher. He graduated from Yale College in 1840. He studied for three years in the Yale Divinity School.

== Career ==
Thacher began preaching in June 1843 in the Congregational Church in Derby and was ordained paster on January 4, 1844. He moved to the Congregational Church in Nantucket, Massachusetts, and preached there from November 14, 1848, to May 14, 1850. He was then pastor at Allen Street Presbyterian Church in New York City from May 26, 1850, to October 9, 1854. He was pastor at the 1st Congregational Church in Meriden, Connecticut, from November 16, 1854, to September 18, 1860. He was pastor at Orthodox Congregational Church in Keokuk, Iowa, from October 30, 1860, to April 8, 1867. He spent some months in Europe and then took temporary charge of a church in Waterloo, Iowa, in October 1868.

Thacher served as president of the University of Iowa from April 1871 to June 1877. While he was president, the college established the homeopathic department and the department of civil engineering. He re-introduced the military science program and the university built its first sports field. During his tenure, Iowa's high schools became more associated with the university and students from qualified high schools had their entrance examinations exempt. He left the presidency due to poor health. He then preached at the Congregational Church in Iowa City. He resigned due to health in March 1878.

== Personal life ==
Thacher married Sarah M. Smith, daughter of reverend Noah Smith, of South Britain, Connecticut, in April 1844. They had two children. She died in 1850. He married her sister Mary S. Smith on August 27, 1851. They had one child. He was the brother of Yale administrator and professor Thomas Anthony Thacher.

Thacher died from a disease of the brain and heart on December 27, 1878, at his home on Asylum Avenue and Gillette Street in Hartford.

== Awards ==
In 1871, he received an honorary Doctor of Divinity by both Knox College and by Iowa College.

Academic offices
Preceded by Nathan Ransom Leonard (acting); James Black	President of the University of Iowa; 1871–1877	Succeeded by Christian W. Slagle (acting); Josiah Little Pickard
