= James O. Freedman =

American educator and academic administrator

15th President of Dartmouth College
- In office 1987–1998
- Preceded by: David T. McLaughlin
- Succeeded by: James E. Wright

President of the University of Iowa
- In office 1982–1987
- Preceded by: Willard L. Boyd
- Succeeded by: Hunter R. Rawlings III

Dean of the University of Pennsylvania Law School
- In office 1978–1982
- Preceded by: Louis Pollak
- Succeeded by: Robert Mundheim

Personal details
- Born: James Oliver Freedman; September 21, 1935 Manchester, New Hampshire, U.S.
- Died: March 21, 2006 (aged 70) Cambridge, Massachusetts, U.S.
- Education: Harvard University (AB); Yale University (LLB)

James Oliver Freedman (September 21, 1935 – March 21, 2006) was an American educator and academic administrator. A graduate of Harvard College and Yale Law School, he served as Dean of the University of Pennsylvania Law School from 1979 to 1982, before becoming the 16th president of the University of Iowa from 1982 to 1987, and then the 15th president of Dartmouth College, from 1987 to 1998. At both Iowa and Dartmouth, Freedman sought to create as The New York Times described it, "a haven for intellectuals," with mixed results. Freedman was a member of both the American Academy of Arts and Sciences and the American Philosophical Society.

== Early life and education ==
Freedman was born in Manchester, New Hampshire on September 21, 1935. He graduated from Harvard College and Yale Law School.

== Career ==
=== University of Iowa presidency ===
Freedman's tenure at the University of Iowa was marked by his support for a $25 million laser research center. In his words, "The University of Iowa can grasp the opportunity for national and world leadership in laser science." Freedman argued that the laser would become a magnet for research grants from Federal and International agencies, and the Iowa legislature appropriated the $25 million necessary to build the center. The center was unable to attract significant research funding, however, after it was completed.

=== Dartmouth College presidency ===
As president of Dartmouth College, a private Ivy League university in Hanover, New Hampshire, Freedman grew the physical campus and strengthened Dartmouth's graduate programs and professional schools. A small but vocal number of alumni viewed the initiatives the "Harvardization of Dartmouth."

President Freedman established or revitalized programs in Latin American, Latino, and Caribbean Studies; Environmental Studies; Jewish Studies; and Linguistics and Cognitive Science. He introduced or restored the teaching of the Arabic, Hebrew, and Japanese languages, founded the Institute of Arctic Studies, and incorporated into the curriculum majors in Women's Studies and African and African-American Studies. During his administration, Dartmouth achieved gender equality in the student body. In the professorial ranks the College led the Ivy League with the highest proportion of women among tenured and tenure-track faculty.

Freedman also presided over the largest capital campaign in Dartmouth's history, the "Will to Excel" campaign, which raised $568 million, exceeding the original $425 million goal. His administration saw the addition of state-of-the-art buildings for the Computer Sciences, Chemistry, and Psychology, as well as The Roth Center for Jewish Life and the Rauner Special Collections Library.

Shortly before he stepped down in 1998, ground was broken for the Baker-Berry Library project, a pioneering model for access to books and electronic information in the 21st century.

== Book ==
Freedman authored Idealism and Liberal Education, and was a spokesman for the importance of the liberal arts.

== Death ==
On March 21, 2006, Freedman died of non-Hodgkin's lymphoma in Cambridge, Massachusetts.

== Criticism ==
The one event in Freedman's presidency that garnered the most media coverage was the so-called "Hitler Quote" scandal of The Dartmouth Review in 1990. A member of the staff of the controversial conservative weekly student newspaper inserted a quote from Mein Kampf into the masthead of an edition of the paper, which was published on Yom Kippur, the holiest day in the Jewish year. In the same edition, the paper also printed a drawing of Freedman as Hitler. The paper's editor discovered the quote three days after the paper was distributed, pulled available copies, and issued a campus-wide apology, but the quotation was seen as the latest in a series of attention-getting stunts that were either provocative or offensive depending on the reader's point of view.

Freedman's administration undertook the building of the "second Green" in an attempt to create a genuine sense of intellectual community at the college.

George Mason University School of Law professor Todd Zywicki, a Dartmouth alum and trustee, later referred to Freedman as a "truly evil man" whose "agenda was to turn Dartmouth into Harvard." Former Dartmouth Senior Fellow William C. Dowling, noting that the danger of Dartmouth ever becoming like Harvard was exceedingly remote, characterized Zywicki's remark as typical of a "brutal philistinism too often associated with the Dartmouth name." Dartmouth's Board of Trustees publicly repudiated any association with Zywicki's sentiments. On December 18, 2007, head of the Board Ed Haldeman (Dartmouth '70) issued a statement noting that "Mr. Zywicki has apologized to members of the Freedman family and indicated that he would like to retract other parts of his speech." Zywicki was not reelected to the Board.

Academic offices
Preceded by Duane C. Spriestersbach (interim); Willard L. Boyd	President of the University of Iowa; 1982–1987	Succeeded by Richard D. Remington
Preceded by Louis Pollak	Dean of the University of Pennsylvania Law School; 1978-1982	Succeeded by Robert Mundheim
