= Richard D. Remington =

Richard D. Remington (August 2, 1931 – July 26, 1992) was an acting President of the University of Iowa, serving from 1987 to 1988. He received his bachelor's and master's degrees, both in Mathematics, from the University of Montana and his M.P.H. and Ph.D. in Public Health Statistics from the University of Michigan. He married Betty Brooks Morrison on Dec. 28, 1952. From 1982 to 1988, he was the vice president for academic affairs and dean of the faculties at the University of Iowa, and was acting president from 1987 to 1988. He also served as director of the Institute for Health, Behavior and Environmental Policy at the University of Iowa's College of Medicine. He held the position of UI Foundation Distinguished Professor of Preventive Medicine and Environmental Health, which he retained until his death in 1992.

Academic offices
Preceded by James O. Freedman	Acting President of the University of Iowa; 1987–1988	Succeeded by Hunter R. Rawlings III
