= Medical College Admission Test =

Standardized examination for prospective medical students in the United States and Canada

- Acronym: MCAT
- Type: Computer-based standardized test
- Administrator: Association of American Medical Colleges
- Skills tested: Physical sciences, biological sciences, verbal reasoning
- Purpose: Admissions to medical colleges
- Year started: 1928; 98 years ago
- Score range: 118–132 for each of four sections, totaling 472–528
- Score validity: Usually 2 to 3 years
- Offered: At least 25 times per year, from January to September
- Restrictions on attempts: Maximum of three times in a one year period; four times in a two-year period; and seven times for life
- Regions: Mainly United States and Canada, in addition to 19 other countries
- Languages: English
- Prerequisites: Preparing to apply to a health professional school (fluency in English is assumed)
- Fee: US$310–US$460 ("Fee Assistance Program" available to U.S. citizens, permanent residents or refugees, demonstrating financial need.)
- Used by: Medical colleges (mostly in United States and Canada)
- Website: students-residents.aamc.org/applying-medical-school/taking-mcat-exam/

The Medical College Admission Test (MCAT; /ˈɛmkæt/ EM-kat) is a computer-based standardized examination for prospective medical students in the United States, Canada, Australia, and the Caribbean Islands. It is designed to assess problem solving, critical thinking, written analysis and knowledge of scientific concepts and principles. Before 2007, the exam was a paper-and-pencil test; since 2007, all administrations of the exam have been computer-based.

The most recent version of the exam was introduced in April 2015 and takes approximately 7 1/2 hours to complete, including breaks. The test is scored in a range from 472 to 528. The MCAT is administered by the Association of American Medical Colleges (AAMC).

== History ==
=== Moss Test: 1928–1946 ===
In the 1920s, dropout rates in US medical schools soared from 5% to 50%, leading to the development of a test that would measure readiness for medical school. Physician and psychologist Fred August Moss and his colleagues developed the "Scholastic Aptitude Test for Medical Students" consisting of true-false and multiple choice questions divided into six to eight subtests. Topics tested included visual memory, memory for content, scientific vocabulary, scientific definitions, understanding of printed material, premedical information, and logical reasoning. The score scale varied from different test forms. Though it had been criticized at the time for testing only memorization ability and thus only readiness for the first two years of medical school, later scholars denied this. In addition to stricter medical school admission procedures and higher educational standards, the national dropout rate among freshman medical students decreased from 20% in 1925–1930 to 7% in 1946.

=== A simpler test: 1946–1962 ===
Advancements in test measurement technology, including machine scoring of tests, and changed views regarding test scores and medical school readiness reflected the evolution of the test in this period. The test underwent three major changes. It now had only four sub tests, including verbal ability, quantitative ability, science achievement, and understanding modern society. Questions were all in multiple-choice format. Each subtest was given a single score, and the total score was derived from the sum of the scores from the subtests. The total score ranged from 200 to 800. The individual scores helped medical school admission committees to differentiate the individual abilities among their candidates. Admission committees, however, did not consider the "understanding modern society" section to be of great importance, even though it was created to reward those with broad liberal arts skills, which included knowledge of history, government, economics, and sociology. Committees placed greater emphasis on scores on the scientific achievement section as it was a better predictor of performance in medical school.

From 1946 to 1948, the test was called the "Professional School Aptitude Test" before finally changing its name to the "Medical College Admission Test" when the developer of the test, the Graduate Record Office (under contract with the AAMC) merged with the newly formed Educational Testing Service (ETS). In 1960, the AAMC transferred its contract over to The Psychological Corporation, which was then in charge of maintaining and developing the test.

=== Status quo: 1962–1977 ===
From 1962 to 1977, the MCAT retained much of its previous format, though the "understanding modern society" section was renamed as "general information" due to its expanded content. Handbooks at the time criticized the test as only a measure of intellectual achievement and not of personal characteristics expected of physicians. Admission committees responded to this criticism by measuring personal characteristics among their applicants with various approaches.

=== Phase four: 1977–1991 ===
During phase four, the MCAT underwent several changes. The "general information" section was eliminated and a broader range of knowledge was tested. At this point, topics tested included scientific knowledge, science problems, reading skills analysis, and quantitative skills analysis. Individual scores were reported for biology, chemistry, and physics rather than a composite science score, thus six different scores for the whole test were reported. The score scale changed to 1–15 as opposed to 200–800 from previous versions of the test. Cultural and social bias was minimized. Though the AAMC claimed the new version intended to evaluate "information gathering and analysis, discerning and formulating relationships, and other problem-solving skills", no research supported this claim.

=== Changes: 1991–2014 ===
In 1991, the test changed again. Though the test was still divided into four subtests, they were renamed as the verbal reasoning, biological sciences, physical sciences, and writing sample sections. Questions retained the multiple-choice format, though the majority of the questions were divided into passage sets. Passage-based questions were implemented to evaluate "text comprehension, data analysis, ability to evaluate an argument, or apply knowledge from the passage to other contexts." A new scoring scale was also implemented. The total composite score, which had a range of 3–45, was based on the individual scores of the verbal reasoning, biological sciences, and physical sciences, which each had a score range of 1–15. The writing sample, which consisted of two essays to be written within 30 minutes for each, was graded on a letter scale of J–T with T being the highest attainable score.

The exam in this format was available twice a year (April and August), lasted 8-9 hours with a lunch break, and consisted of 214 questions in addition to the essays. It took 60 days for students to receive their score. On July 18, 2005, the AAMC announced that it would offer the paper-and-pencil version of the MCAT only through August 2006. A subset of testing sites offered a computer-based version of the full-length exam throughout 2005 and 2006.

=== MR5 and the 2015 test ===
The MR5 advisory committee was appointed by AAMC in fall 2008 to conduct the fifth comprehensive review of the MCAT exam and to recommend changes for the new exam set to be released in 2015. The advisory committee had 21 members including medical school deans and administrators, basic and clinical science faculty, pre-health advisors, one medical student and a medical resident. The recommendations determined were also based on responses from 2,700 surveys, over 75 meetings and conferences, and 90 outreach events to solicit input. The recommendations considered the content and format of the MCAT, the resources that should be provided relating to the exam, and the changes that should be made to medical school admissions in general.

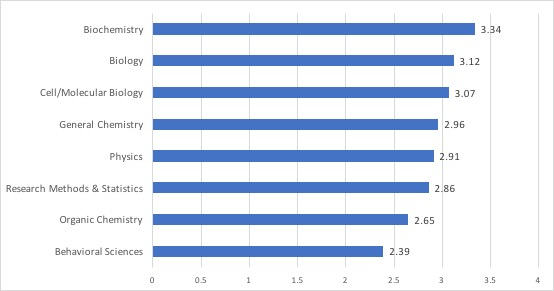
Ratings of the Importance of Natural and Behavioral Sciences Topics for Mastery of Future Medical School Curricula

To determine the content that should be tested for the exam, the MR5 committee surveyed medical school faculty, residents, and medical students, and asked what concepts entering students need to know to be successful in medical school curricula. Three separate surveys were sent asking about concepts in the natural sciences, research methods, and behavioral sciences. The MR5 committee also consulted various expert committees from within and beyond the AAMC.

The largest changes in the exam consist of testing in biochemistry, psychology and sociology concepts. The addition of biochemistry material follows survey results placing biochemistry concepts as highest importance for success in future medical school curricula. The addition of behavioral and cultural material was recommended to provide a solid foundation for learning of these concepts in medical school. According to the committee, psychological science should be understood by medical students as an essential aspect of healthcare. The writing sample section was also removed, since data showed that these scores were not used by most admission committees. These changes were revealed in 2012 so that undergraduate premedical advisers studied the MR5 documents to translate tested core competencies into premedical course recommendations at their campuses.

This version of the MCAT has been administered since March 2015 and is expected to be in place until 2030.

== Administration ==
The exam is offered 25 or more times per year at Pearson VUE centers. The number of administrations may vary each year. As of the 2023 MCAT testing period, 41.8% of students take the MCAT within one year of graduation, 32% sit the exam within 1-2 years post-graduation, 13.5% take the exam between three and four years after graduation and 12.7% sit for the exam five or more years after graduation.

The test, updated in 2015, consists of four sections, listed in the order that they are administered

- Chemical and Physical Foundations of Biological Systems
- Critical Analysis and Reasoning Skills (CARS)
- Biological and Biochemical Foundations of Living Systems
- Psychological, Social and Biological Foundations of Behavior

The four sections are in multiple-choice format. The passages and questions are predetermined, and thus do not change significantly in difficulty depending on the performance of the test taker (unlike, for example, the general Graduate Record Examinations). To account for slight differences in difficulty across test versions, the exam uses a scaled score for each section, converting numerical scores to a scaled score between 118 and 132 per section.

== Test structure ==
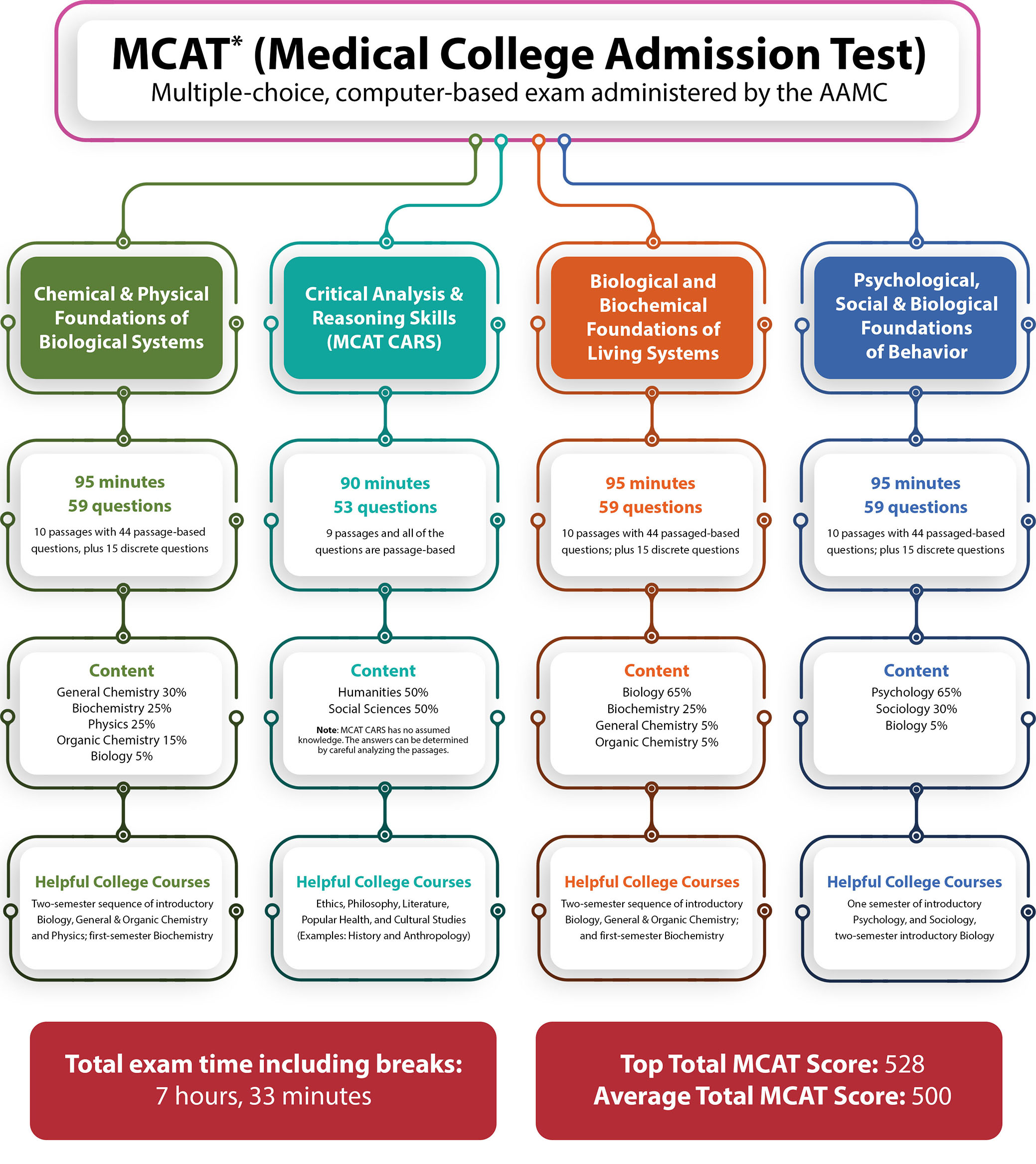
A detailed overview of the Medical College Admission Test (MCAT). It outlines the four sections, number of questions, duration, subject percentages, and helpful college courses. It includes the highest possible and average total scores.

The MCAT consists of four distinct sections that are individually scored. Each section is allotted either 90 or 95 minutes and tests between 53 and 59 questions. Including breaks, the full examination lasts approximately 7 1/2 hours. The information for each of the science sections is organized into 10 foundational concepts and four Scientific Inquiry & Reasoning Skills. The science passages are guided by Scientific Reasoning and Inquiry Skills identified by the MR5 for medical school success. The Critical Analysis and Reasoning Skills section focuses on three skills, since this section does not require outside knowledge to answer questions.

Section	Questions	Minutes
Chemical and Physical Foundations of Biological Systems	59	95
Critical Analysis and Reasoning Skills	53	90
Biological and Biochemical Foundations of Living Systems	59	95
Psychological, Social and Biological Foundations of Behavior	59	95

=== Chemical and Physical Foundations of Biological Systems ===
This section tests chemistry and physics in the scope of biological systems, requiring understanding of organic and inorganic chemistry and physics as well as biology and biochemistry. Specifically, this section focuses on the physical principles underlying biological processes and chemical interactions that form the basis of a broader understanding of living systems. Understanding of research methods and statistics are also important to successfully reason through this material.

=== Critical Analysis and Reasoning Skills (CARS) ===
The CARS section is similar to verbal reasoning sections providing passages with questions testing reading comprehension. The 500-to-600-word passages can cover topics ranging from the social sciences to the humanities, sometimes presenting in a convoluted or biased manner requiring the reader to consider what is being written from multiple perspectives. The passages are designed to discuss topics that are unfamiliar to the reader, but success in this section requires strictly using information from the passage without using previously known knowledge.

=== Biological and Biochemical Foundations of Living Systems ===
This section mainly tests biology and biochemistry but also requires an understanding of organic and inorganic chemistry. Students will have to answer questions about the functions of biomolecules, processes unique to living organisms, and the organization of biological systems. Understanding of research methods and statistics are also important to successfully reason through this material.

=== Psychological, Social and Biological Functions of Behavior ===
This section tests psychology and sociology so that students can demonstrate their understanding of the behavioral and sociocultural determinants of health. Specific material tested include behavior and behavior change, perceptions of self and others, cultural and social differences that influence well-being and social stratification. Understanding of research methods and statistics are also important to successfully reason through this material.

=== Scientific Inquiry and Reasoning Skills ===
In the new MCAT exam, changes have been made not only in the content of the exam, but also in the way in which content is presented on the exam. MCAT questions will require examinees to demonstrate four Scientific Inquiry and Reasoning Skills that have been identified by the MR5 as crucial to success in science and medicine. The first skill is Knowledge of Scientific Concepts and Principles, which requires students to not only recognize and recall scientific information, but also to identify relationships between similar concepts. Scientific Reasoning and Problem Solving tests the student's ability to relate scientific theories and formulas to presented information to explain findings and draw conclusions. Reasoning about the Design and Execution of Research requires examinees to show that they can understand science in the context of experiments. The fourth skill of Data-based and Statistical Reasoning requires students to be able to read graphs and tables and draw conclusion from evidence.

== Scoring ==
The test consists of four sections, each scored from 118 to 132 with a median score of 125. The total MCAT score is a sum of the scores from each of the four sections, ranging from 472 to 528 with a median score of 500. Scores are released on a pre-determined date between 30 and 35 days after the exam date.

=== 2024 scoring percentiles ===
The following are the scores, along with their percentiles from test takers from May 1, 2024, through April 30, 2025. MCAT percentiles are updated every year on May 1. The average scaled score was 500.7 with a standard deviation of 10.8.

MCAT total score percentile ranks (May 1, 2024 – April 30, 2025)
Total score	Percentile rank
472	< 1
473	< 1
474	< 1
475	1
476	1
477	2
478	2
479	3
480	4
481	5
482	6
483	7
484	9
485	10
486	12
487	14
488	16
489	18
490	20
491	22
492	25
493	27
494	30
495	33
496	36
497	39
498	42
499	45
500	48
501	51
502	54
503	58
504	61
505	64
506	67
507	70
508	73
509	76
510	79
511	82
512	84
513	87
514	89
515	91
516	92
517	94
518	95
519	96
520	97
521	98
522	99
523	99
524	100
525	100
526	100
527	100
528	100

== Policies ==
Like some other professional exams (e.g. the Graduate Management Admission Test (GMAT) or the Law School Admissions Test (LSAT)), the MCAT may be voided on the day of the exam if the exam taker is not satisfied with his or her performance. It can be voided at any time during the exam, or during a five-minute window that begins immediately after the end of the last section. The decision to void can only be based on the test taker's self-assessment, as no scoring information is available at the time.

The AAMC prohibits the use of calculators, timers, or other electronic devices during the MCAT exam. Cellular phones are also strictly prohibited from testing rooms and individuals found to possess them are noted by name in a security report submitted to the AAMC. The only item that may be brought into the testing room is the candidate's photo ID. If a jacket or sweater is worn, it may not be removed in the testing room.

It is no longer a rule that students must receive permission from the AAMC if they wish to take the MCAT more than three times in total. The limit with the computerized MCAT is three times per year, with a lifetime limit of seven times. An examinee can register for only one test date at a time, and must wait two days after testing before registering for a new test date.

Scaled MCAT exam results are made available to examinees approximately thirty days after the test via the AAMC's MCAT Testing History (THx) Web application. Examinees do not receive a copy of their scores in the mail, nor are examinees given their raw scores. MCAT THx is also used to transmit scores to medical schools, application services and other organizations (at no cost).

== Preparation ==
The average student spent 3 months preparing for the MCAT exam spending about 20 hours per week, excluding time taking regular courses.

In the weeks leading up to the exam, most students take some time off to study intensely for the exam. The AAMC provides official study materials for purchase on their website with hundreds of questions written by the developers of the MCAT, including four scored practice exams and one non-scored practice exam. As of the 2023 MCAT testing cycle, 89.6% of students used official MCAT Practice Exams, while 61.2% of test-takers reported using official MCAT Question Packs and 58.5% reported using official MCAT Section Banks.

The AAMC also provides free online preparatory material for the MCAT through Khan Academy, including 1,000 free videos and 2,800 review questions including content review and passage-based questions. In 2023, 66.3% of students responded that they used this partner material to prepare for the exam.

== Relevance ==
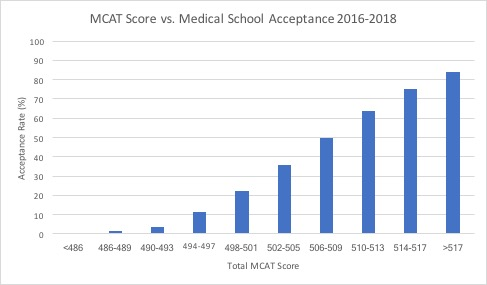
Medical school acceptance based on MCAT Scores, 2016–2018

Almost all United States medical schools and most Canadian medical schools require prospective students to submit MCAT scores for their applications. In a survey conducted by the AAMC of 130 medical schools, MCAT scores were among the most important metrics used to identify applicants to interview and admit. Furthermore, in a 2017 survey by Kaplan, 54% of medical schools said that a low MCAT score was "the biggest application dealbreaker". Medical school admissions is a holistic process and the AAMC provides recommendations on how MCAT scores should be used in admissions, specifically recommending that MCAT scores should not outweigh an applicant's other materials.

A 2016 study showed a small correlation (r = 0.18) between MCAT scores and USMLE step 1 scores. The MCAT exhibited a medium correlation (r = 0.32) with the Canadian Board exam in 2016, the (MCCQE-1). The Biological Sciences section had been the most directly correlated section to success on the USMLE Step 1 exam in an article published in 2002, with medium-to-large correlation coefficients of 0.55 vs 0.49 for Physical Sciences and a medium correlation of 0.40 for Verbal Reasoning.

Results from the previous version of the MCAT that was administered between 1992 and 2014 have been studied in relation to academic success in medical school and beyond. Most data suggests that undergraduate grades and MCAT scores can predict scores on USMLE Step exams. Data from a cohort of 14 medical schools in 1992 and 1993 found that MCAT scores were stronger predictors of USMLE Step scores than undergraduate GPA and were also good predictors for probability of experiencing academic difficulty. Data from students from 119 U.S. medical schools who matriculated between 2001 and 2004 showed that undergraduate GPA and MCAT total scores predicted unimpeded progress towards medical school graduation better than GPA alone. A third study using data from students from the University of Minnesota Medical School from five graduating classes between 2011 and 2015, found that MCAT component scores were significantly associated with USMLE Step 1 and Step 2 scores, although the effect was small. Higher MCAT scores are correlated with membership in the national medical honors society Alpha Omega Alpha, suggesting that MCAT scores can be useful to identify potential top-performing medical students.

Since the most recent version of the MCAT exam was only released in 2015, insufficient years have passed to determine correlation between MCAT scores and medical school benchmarks. The AAMC plans to use medical school data from 2017 to 2021 to determine the predictive ability of the new MCAT. The data will be collected from 18 medical schools who have agreed to collect data from students from entry to graduation including academic performance, USMLE Step exam scores, time to graduation and graduation rates.

== See also ==
- List of admissions tests
