= Thomas Huston Macbride =

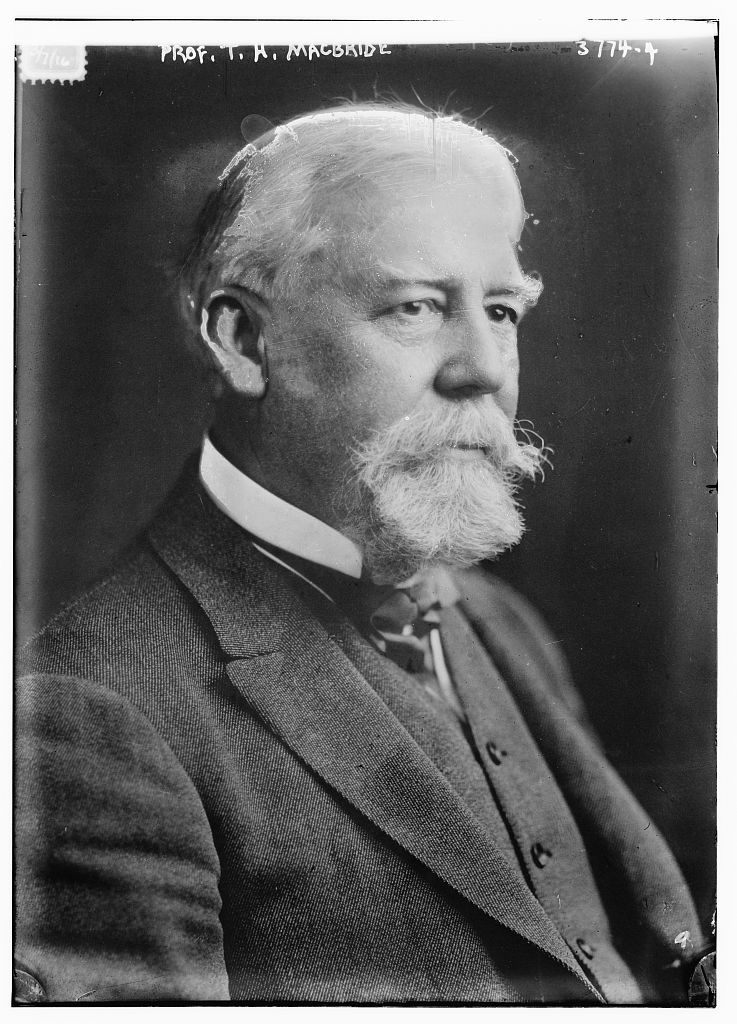
Thomas Huston Macbride in 1915

Thomas Huston Macbride (July 31, 1848 – March 27, 1934) was the tenth president of the University of Iowa, serving from 1914 to 1916. Macbride was a naturalist and botanist, Macbride Hall at the University of Iowa is named for him. He often collaborated with Samuel Calvin. He was the 75th member of the Acacia chapter at the University of Iowa.

In 1909, botanist Fred Jay Seaver published Macbridella a genus of (in fungi family of Melanommataceae), and named in his honour.

Then in 1934, botanist Henry Clark Gilbert in the journal of Univ. Iowa Stud. Nat. Hist. circumscribed the genus of Amoebozoa (from the family Stemonitidaceae), Macbrideola. He noted 'This new genus is named in honor of Dr. Thomas H. Macbride, late President Emeritus of the University of Iowa. For more than forty years Dr. Macbride collected and studied the Myxomycetes. His contributions to our knowledge of the North American forms of this group are the greatest ever made by any one person. This new genus is particularly appropriate to commemorate Dr. Macbride's work because the type species, M. scintillans, finds its ideal habitat in the beautiful woodlands of the Iowa country in which Dr. Macbride labored. It is hoped that this beautiful though minute Myxomycete may bear this name and ever remind us of the work of a great and good scholar.'

Academic offices
Preceded by John Gabbert Bowman	President of the University of Iowa; 1914–1916	Succeeded by Walter Albert Jessup
