= Di Eugenio =

Di Eugenio or DiEugenio is an Italian surname. Notable people with the surname include:

- Barbara Di Eugenio, Italian-American computer scientist
- James DiEugenio, American historian, author and screenwriter
