= David Knapp =

David Knapp may refer to:

- David C. Knapp (1927–2010), American educational administrator
- David Berry Knapp, mayor of Rajneeshpuram
