= Kotlikoff =

Kotlikoff is a surname. Notable people with the surname include:

- Laurence Kotlikoff (born 1951), American academic and politician
- Michael Kotlikoff, American veterinarian and academic
