= Hunter R. Rawlings III =

American classics scholar and academic administrator

Hunter Rawlings

President of Cornell University
- In office 1995 – 2003; Interim; 2016 – 2017; 2005 – 2006
- Preceded by: Frank H. T. Rhodes
- Succeeded by: Jeffrey S. Lehman

6th President of the Association of American Universities
- In office 2011–2016
- Preceded by: Robert M. Berdahl
- Succeeded by: Mary Sue Coleman

President of the University of Iowa
- In office 1988–1995
- Preceded by: James O. Freedman
- Succeeded by: Mary Sue Coleman

Personal details
- Born: December 14, 1944 (age 81) Norfolk, Virginia, U.S.
- Education: Haverford College; Princeton University

Hunter Ripley Rawlings III (born December 14, 1944) is an American classics scholar and academic administrator. He is best known for serving as the 17th President of the University of Iowa from 1987 until 1995 and as the 10th President of Cornell University from 1995 until 2003. He also served as Cornell's interim president in 2005–2006 and again from 2016–2017. Currently, Rawlings is Professor and University President Emeritus at the Department of Classics.

Rawlings served as president of the Association of American Universities from June 1, 2011, until April 2016. He has served as chair of both the Association of American Universities and the Ivy Council of Presidents. He is a member of the American Academy of Arts and Sciences, and he serves on the boards of the American School of Classical Studies in Athens, Haverford College, and the National Academy Foundation.

== Early life, family and career ==
Originally from Norfolk, Virginia, Rawlings received his B.A. with honors in classics from Haverford College in 1966. From there he moved to Princeton University, where he received a Ph.D. in classics in 1970. After graduating from Princeton, he joined the faculty at the University of Colorado at Boulder, rising to full professor in 1980. Rawlings began his career in academic administration at Colorado, serving as chairman of the classics department and later as associate vice chancellor for instruction. In 1988, Rawlings was named president of the University of Iowa, a position he held until 1995. Rawlings is married to Elizabeth T. Rawlings (née Trapnell), who is a professional translator with a master's degree in French from the University of North Carolina and a Master of Fine Arts degree in Literary Translation from the University of Iowa. She has translated and collaborated in translating a number of books from French to English, particularly in the fields of Greek and Latin literature and ancient history. The Rawlingses have four children and five grandchildren. His eldest son, Hunter Rawlings IV is New York Times Bestselling author and a former U.S. Marine Corps reconnaissance officer.

== President of Cornell University ==
Rawlings came to Cornell University, becoming its 10th president, serving from 1995 until 2003. At Cornell, he was an effective fundraiser, presiding over several large capital campaigns. Rawlings created several new positions and programs to support undergraduate education, began the construction of several new dormitories, centralized the location of freshmen on campus (initially protested by Al Sharpton and others due to alleged racial implications), and promoted stronger undergraduate admissions standards. Rawlings began initiatives in certain areas of science and engineering that he considered especially important to the future (such as bioinformatics, computational biology, computer and information sciences, genomics, and materials science), and began plans for Weill Hall, a large new life sciences building which houses the Weill Institute for Cell and Molecular Biology. He encouraged interdisciplinary exchanges in the humanities and social sciences. He also presided over an agreement to establish a branch of Cornell's medical school in Qatar, the Weill Cornell Medical College in Qatar.

While President of Cornell, Rawlings also held the rank of professor of classics, and continued to hold this position after he left the presidency. Notably, during the last two years of his presidency, he taught an undergraduate course in classics. At the same time, Rawlings faced criticism from many students and alumni leaders for his hands-off approach toward the student body and his focus on the business operations of Cornell.

After the sudden resignation of his successor as president, Jeffrey Lehman, effective June 30, 2005, Rawlings agreed to reassume the presidency on an interim basis until a permanent replacement could be found. On January 21, 2006, David J. Skorton was announced as the next president of Cornell. Skorton took office on July 1. (Like Rawlings, Skorton was previously President of the University of Iowa.)

After the sudden passing of Skorton's successor, President Elizabeth Garrett, in March 2016, Rawlings was appointed interim president. He began on April 25, 2016.

== Research ==
Rawlings' research focuses on Greek history and historiography. His scholarly publications include a book, The Structure of Thucydides' History (Princeton University Press, 1981).

== Notes ==
Academic offices
Preceded by Richard D. Remington (acting); James O. Freedman	President of the University of Iowa; 1988–1995	Succeeded by Peter E. Nathan (acting); Mary Sue Coleman
Preceded by Frank H. T. Rhodes	President of Cornell University; 1995–2003	Succeeded by Jeffrey S. Lehman
Preceded by Jeffrey S. Lehman	President of Cornell University (interim); 2005 – June 30, 2006	Succeeded by David J. Skorton
Preceded by Elizabeth Garrett	President of Cornell University (interim); April 25, 2016 – April 17, 2017	Succeeded by Martha E. Pollack
