= Jeffrey S. Lehman =

American legal scholar (born 1956)

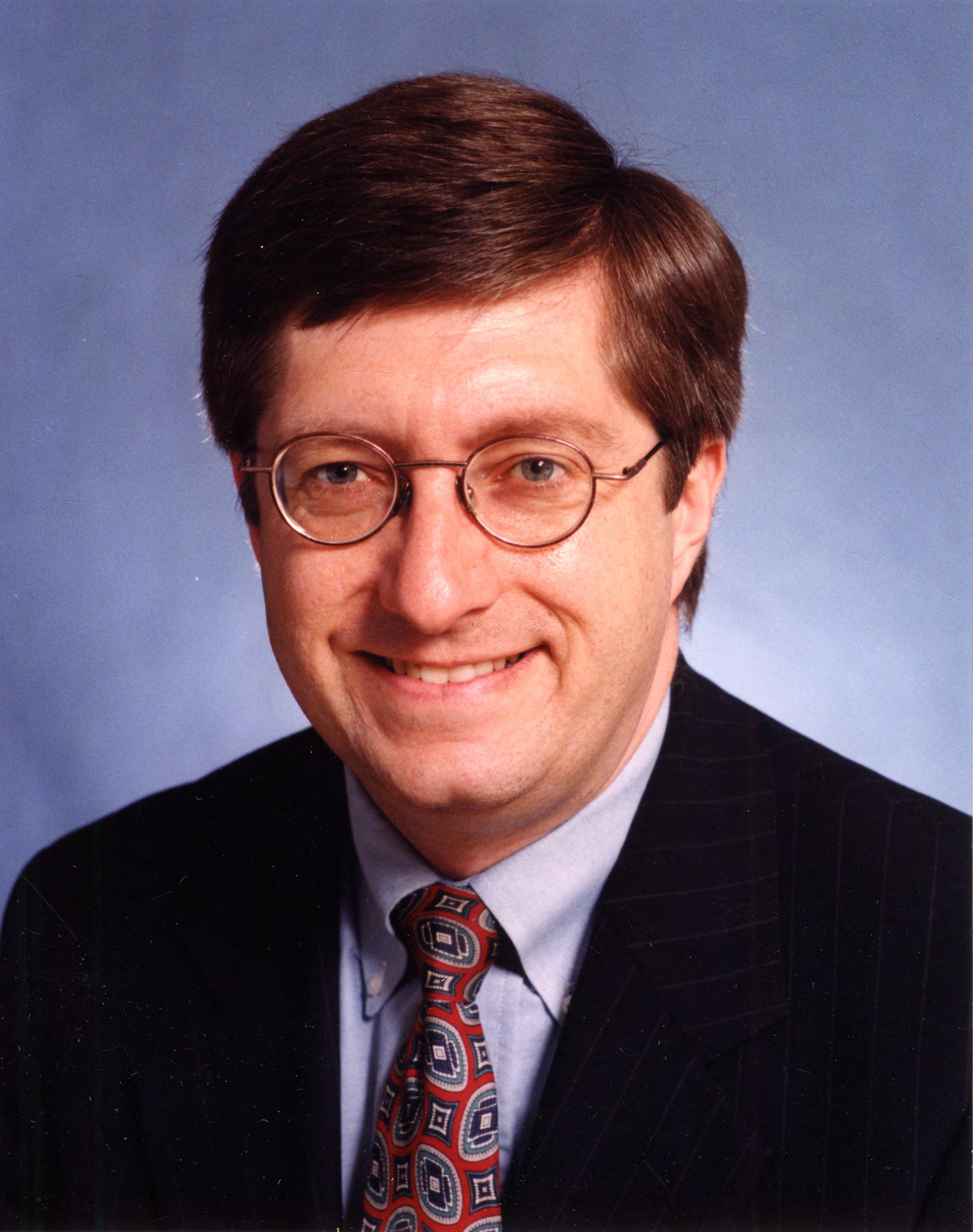
- Lehman in 2000

1st Vice Chancellor of New York University Shanghai
- Incumbent
- Assumed office 2012
- Preceded by: Office established

11th President of Cornell University
- In office July 1, 2003 – June 2005
- Preceded by: Hunter R. Rawlings III
- Succeeded by: David J. Skorton

15th Dean of University of Michigan Law School
- In office 1994–2003
- Preceded by: Lee Bollinger
- Succeeded by: Evan H. Caminker

Personal details
- Born: August 1, 1956 (age 70) Bronxville, New York, U.S.
- Education: Cornell University (BA); University of Michigan (JD, MPP)

Jeffrey Sean Lehman (born August 1, 1956) is an American legal scholar and academic administrator who is the vice chancellor of New York University Shanghai. Known as an advocate for the role of universities in globalization, he previously served as chancellor and founding dean of the Peking University School of Transnational Law in Shenzhen, China, president of Cornell University, dean of the University of Michigan Law School, and chairman of Internet2.

On April 14, 2018, Lehman was one of forty named "The Most Influential Foreign Experts During 40 Years of China’s Reform and Opening-Up” at the 16th Conference on International Exchange of Professionals, for his work in higher education in China.

== Early life and education ==
Born August 1, 1956, in Bronxville, New York, Lehman earned an undergraduate degree in mathematics from Cornell University. While a student at Cornell, Lehman was active in the Alpha Phi Omega fraternity and co-wrote the book 1000 Ways to Win Monopoly Games, with future tech entrepreneur Jay S. Walker. He spent his junior year participating in the Sweet Briar College Junior Year in France. He went on to receive a J.D. and a M.P.P. from the University of Michigan, where he served as editor-in-chief of Michigan Law Review.

== Career ==
After graduating, he served as law clerk for Chief Judge Frank M. Coffin of the United States Court of Appeals for the First Circuit, and then for Associate Justice John Paul Stevens of the U.S. Supreme Court. After practicing law in Washington, D.C., Lehman returned to the University of Michigan in 1987 to join the law school faculty. He also taught as a visiting professor at the Yale Law School and the University of Paris.

=== University of Michigan Law School dean ===
In 1994, Lehman became Dean of the University of Michigan Law School, where he was at that time the youngest law school dean in the U.S. During his deanship, Michigan became the first U.S. law school to require all J.D. students to complete a course in transnational law. The school also drew attention for initiatives in public service and the teaching of legal writing. From 2001 to 2003, he served as president of the American Law Deans Association.

Along with then-University President Lee Bollinger, Lehman received national attention in the 2003 Supreme Court case of Grutter v. Bollinger in which the University largely succeeded in defending the law school's affirmative action admissions policies.

=== Cornell University president ===
In 2003, Lehman became the 11th president of Cornell University. As president of Cornell, he oversaw effective large-scale fundraising efforts. In 2004, Cornell ranked third in the nation in university fundraising (behind only Harvard and Stanford), raising over US$375 million that year alone. Lehman was also known for prominently promoting his "three themes": "life in the age of the genome," "wisdom in the age of digital information" and "sustainability in the age of development." These themes arose from intensive engagement with faculty, students and Cornellians during his first year, a process that won him great respect across campus. Lehman pioneered the concept of a "transnational" university, by opening a medical campus in Doha, Qatar and cooperative education and research arrangements with universities in China, India and Singapore.

In 2005, Lehman resigned from the presidency, citing irreconcilable differences with the leadership of the Cornell Board of Trustees — an announcement that came as a surprise to most of the Cornell community and to outsiders. Lehman's tenure was by far the shortest of any Cornell President until the death of Elizabeth Garrett in 2016. Specific reasoning for Lehman's departure has been highly secretive and subject to occasional debate within the Cornell faculty and alumni communities.

Lehman remained a member of the Cornell Law School faculty until 2012. In 2007, Cornell published An Optimistic Heart, a book of speeches that Lehman wrote and delivered as president.

=== Peking University School of Transnational Law dean ===
After serving as a senior scholar at the Woodrow Wilson International Center for Scholars in Washington, D.C., Lehman became the chancellor and founding dean of the Peking University School of Transnational Law, located on the university's Shenzhen campus. The school is modeled on the American style of law school, and it is intended that graduates will be eligible to sit for the New York bar exam. On Sept. 29, 2011, Lehman was a recipient of the 2011 Friendship Award, China’s highest award for foreign experts who have made outstanding contributions to China’s economic and social progress.

=== NYU Shanghai founding vice chancellor ===
In April 2012, it was announced that Lehman would be steering the new institution jointly with Yu Lizhong, former president of New York University's local partner, East China Normal University. "Yu will be the chancellor and will play a major role in government relations. ... Lehman, as vice chancellor, will have free rein in academic affairs. The first students will arrive in fall 2013, the majority of them from China." In the time from summer, 2012 until opening, Lehman is dividing his time between New York and Shanghai.

=== Other professional activities ===
From 2007 to 2011, Lehman chaired the board of Internet2, an advanced not-for-profit U.S. networking consortium led by members from the research and education communities, industry, and government.

From 2006 to 2017, Lehman was an independent director of Infosys, Limited, a NASDAQ listed technology company headquartered in Bangalore, India.

During 2020 and 2021, Lehman chaired the board of the American Chamber of Commerce in Shanghai.

== See also ==
- List of law clerks for the fourth seat of the Supreme Court of the United States

Academic offices
Preceded by Lee C. Bollinger	Dean of the University of Michigan Law School; 1994–2003	Succeeded by Evan Caminker
Preceded by Hunter R. Rawlings III	President of Cornell University; 2003-2005	Succeeded by David J. Skorton
