= Cornelis de Kiewiet =

Dutch-born American historian

Cornelis Willem de Kiewiet
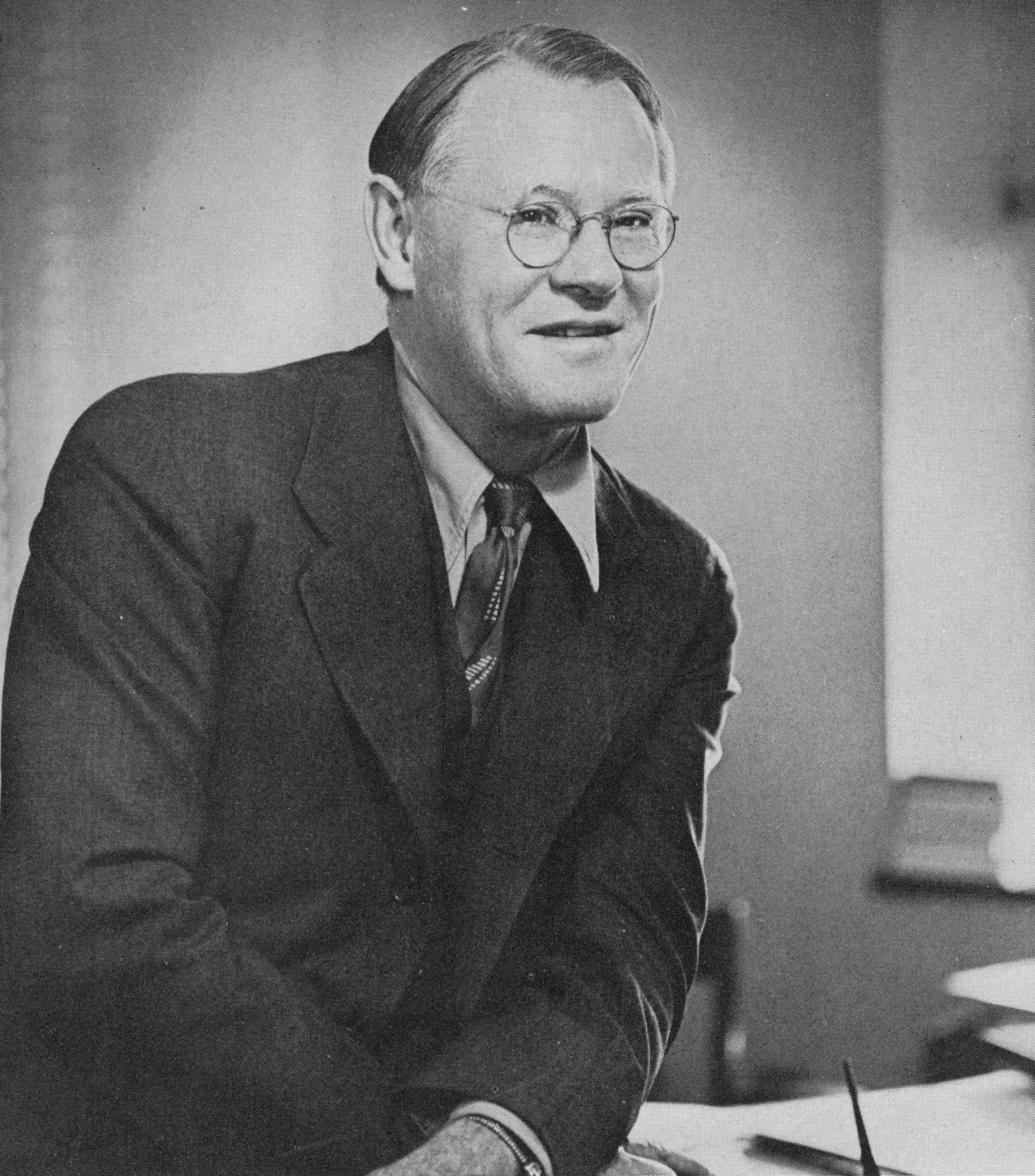

5th President of the University of Rochester
- In office 1951–1961
- Preceded by: Alan C. Valentine
- Succeeded by: W. Allen Wallis

Acting President of Cornell University
- In office 1949–1951
- Preceded by: Edmund Ezra Day
- Succeeded by: Deane Waldo Malott

Provost of Cornell University
- In office 1948–1951
- Preceded by: Arthur S. Adams
- Succeeded by: Forrest F. Hill

Personal details
- Born: May 21, 1902 Rotterdam, the Netherlands
- Died: February 15, 1986 (aged 83) Washington, D.C., U.S.
- Resting place: National Memorial Park, Falls Church, Virginia
- Spouse: Lucea Marian Hejinian
- Children: 3
- Education: University of the Witwatersrand, University of London, University of Paris, University of Berlin
- Profession: Historian, administrator

Cornelis Willem de Kiewiet (May 21, 1902 – February 15, 1986) was a Dutch-born American historian most notable for having served as president of Cornell University and the University of Rochester.

== Biography ==
De Kiewiet was born in the Netherlands, but grew up in South Africa, where his father went as a diamond and gold-seeker and later worked as an employee of the Transvaal Republic's Railway. In the early 1920s, Cornelis earned his bachelor's and master's degrees in history from the University of Witwatersrand in Johannesburg, and, in 1927, he earned his Ph.D. in History from the University of London.

De Kiewiet emigrated to the United States in 1929 when he was offered a position teaching European history at the University of Iowa. In 1941, he joined the faculty of Cornell University, where he taught modern European history and pursued his research interests in British colonial policy, particularly in South Africa. In the mid-1940s, de Kiewiet became dean of the College of Arts and Sciences at Cornell and, in 1948, he was named University provost. The following year, de Kiewiet was appointed Cornell's acting president as well and served in that position for two years until he was recruited to become president of the University of Rochester in 1951. He served as Rochester's president until his retirement in 1961. In retirement, de Kiewiet devoted his energies to the issue of higher education in Africa.

There is a residential building at the University of Rochester named after de Kiewiet.

== Selected works ==
- Kiewiet, Cornelis W. de (1929), "British Colonial Policy and the South African Republics, 1848–1872", The Geographical Journal, 73 (6), London: Longmans, Green, and Co: 565, Bibcode:1929GeogJ..73..565C, doi:10.2307/1785357, JSTOR 1785357, OCLC 5003249
- Kiewiet, Cornelis W. de (1966) [1937], The Imperial Factor in South Africa; a Study in Politics and Economics, New York, New York: Russell & Russell, OCLC 414863
- Kiewiet, Cornelis W. de (1941), A History of South Africa, Social and Economic., Oxford, England: Clarendon Press, OCLC 351500
- Kiewiet, Cornelis W. de (1956), The Anatomy of South African Misery, London: Oxford University Press, OCLC 2652336

Academic offices
| Preceded by Arthur S. Adams | Provost of Cornell University; 1948–1951 | Succeeded by Forrest F. Hill |
| Preceded by Edmund E. Day | President of Cornell University (acting); 1949–1951 | Succeeded by Deane W. Malott |
| Preceded by Alan C. Valentine | President of the University of Rochester; 1951–1961 | Succeeded by W. Allen Wallis |
