= List of presidents of Cornell University =

President of Cornell University
- Incumbent; Michael Kotlikoff since March 21, 2025 (Interim: July 1, 2024 – March 21, 2025)
- Appointer: Cornell University Board of Trustees
- Inaugural holder: Andrew Dickson White
- Formation: 1866
- Website: https://president.cornell.edu/about/

The president of Cornell University is the chief administrator of Cornell University, an Ivy League institution in Ithaca, New York. Included in the list below are all Presidents of Cornell University from Andrew Dickson White, the university's co-founder and first president from 1865 to 1888, through the 15th and current president, Michael Kotlikoff, who was appointed president of the university in 2025. Since the university's founding in 1865, there have been 15 Presidents of Cornell University, excluding four interregnum presidents who served during university presidential transitions.

New York's only land-grant university, Cornell University was founded in 1865 by Ezra Cornell and Andrew Dickson White. Its main campus is in Ithaca, New York. Its medical school, Weill Cornell Medicine, is located in Manhattan, New York City, and it also maintains a facility in the Education City section Qatar. In 1954, Cornell joined the newly formed Ivy League, and the league's only land-grant institution.

== List of presidents ==
The following persons have served as president of Cornell University:

No.	President	Term start	Term end	Ref.
1	Andrew Dickson White (1832–1918) (Note: White was the co-founder of Cornell University, along with Ezra Cornell, and introduced the bill in the New York State Senate establishing Cornell University. The bill was passed and became the university's charter.)	1866	1885	
2	Charles Kendall Adams (1835–1902)	1885	1892	
3	Jacob Gould Schurman (1854–1942)	1892	1920	
4	Livingston Farrand (1867–1939)	1921	1937	
5	Edmund Ezra Day (1883–1951)	1937	1949	
interim	Cornelis de Kiewiet (1902–1986)	1949	1951	
6	Deane Waldo Malott (1898–1996)	1951	1963	
7	James Alfred Perkins (1911–1998)	1963	1969	
8	Dale R. Corson (1914–2012)	1969	1977	
9	Frank H. T. Rhodes (1926–2020)	August 1, 1977	June 30, 1995	
10	Hunter R. Rawlings III (born 1944)	July 1, 1995	June 30, 2003	
11	Jeffrey S. Lehman (born 1956)	July 1, 2003	June 30, 2005	
interim	Hunter R. Rawlings III (born 1944)	July 1, 2005	June 30, 2006	
12	David J. Skorton (born 1949)	July 1, 2006	June 30, 2015	
13	H. Elizabeth Garrett (1963–2016)	July 1, 2015	March 6, 2016 (Note: Died in office.)	
acting	Michael I. Kotlikoff	February 22, 2016 (Note: Provost Kotlikoff was appointed acting president while Garrett was being treated for cancer.)	April 24, 2016	
interim	Hunter R. Rawlings III (born 1944)	April 25, 2016	April 16, 2017	
14	Martha E. Pollack (born 1958)	April 17, 2017	June 30, 2024	
Interim	Michael I. Kotlikoff	July 1, 2024	March 21, 2025	
15	Michael I. Kotlikoff	March 21, 2025	present	

Table notes:

== See also ==
- History of Cornell University
