= Edmund Ezra Day =

American educator (1883–1951)

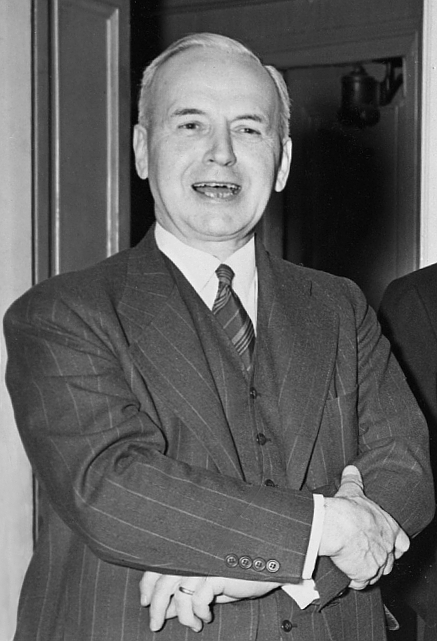
- Day in 1947

5th President of Cornell University
- In office 1937–1949
- Preceded by: Livingston Farrand
- Succeeded by: Cornelis de Kiewiet acting

Personal details
- Born: December 7, 1883 Manchester, New Hampshire, U.S.
- Died: March 23, 1951 (aged 67) Ithaca, New York, U.S.
- Education: Dartmouth College (A.B., M.A.); Harvard University (Ph.D.)

Edmund Ezra Day (December 7, 1883 – March 23, 1951) was an American educator.

== Biography ==
Day received his undergraduate and master's degrees from Dartmouth College and his doctorate in economics from Harvard. While at Dartmouth, he became a brother of Theta Delta Chi. In 1921 he was elected as a Fellow of the American Statistical Association. In 1923 he went to the University of Michigan, where he served as professor of economics, organizer and first dean of the School of Business Administration, and Dean of the University. He went on to serve as the fifth president of Cornell University from 1937 to 1949. While in office, he helped establish the School of Industrial and Labor Relations at Cornell.

== Legacy and honors ==
The main administrative building at Cornell was built in 1947 and named Day Hall in his honor. Day is one of only fifteen people whose remains are interred in Cornell's Sage Chapel, a list which includes founders Ezra Cornell and Andrew Dickson White, as well as "third founder" Henry W. Sage.

Academic offices
Preceded by Livingston Farrand	President of Cornell University; 1937–1949	Succeeded by Cornelis W. de Kiewiet (acting)
