= Deane Waldo Malott =

American university president (1898–1996)

6th President of Cornell University
- In office 1951–1963
- Preceded by: Cornelis de Kiewiet acting
- Succeeded by: James A. Perkins

8th Chancellor of the University of Kansas
- In office 1939–1950
- Preceded by: Ernest Lindley
- Succeeded by: Franklin David Murphy

Personal details
- Born: July 10, 1898 Abilene, Kansas, U.S.
- Died: September 11, 1996 (aged 98) Ithaca, New York, U.S.

Deane Waldo Malott (July 10, 1898 – September 11, 1996) was an American academic and administrator.

== Early life and education ==
The son of a banker, Malott was born in Abilene, Kansas, on July 10, 1898, and went on to study at the University of Kansas. While there, he wrote for the University Daily Kansan and was a brother in the Alpha Nu chapter of the Beta Theta Pi fraternity and the Alpha Kappa Psi business fraternity. He graduated in 1921 with a degree in economics, and he went on to the Harvard Business School.

== Career ==
Following his 1923 graduation, he worked as an administrator at Harvard until 1929 when he was hired by the Hawaiian Pineapple Company. He returned to Harvard in 1933 as a Professor and then in 1939 he returned to his alma mater to become Chancellor of University of Kansas. While serving as Chancellor of the university, he helped oversee the transition of a peacetime campus to a wartime one, and enabled KU to train thousands of military personnel.

In 1951, Malott accepted the position of 6th president of Cornell University. His 12-year term as president brought about the era of 'Big Science' at Cornell: in 1961 sponsored research funding came to over $39 million. His term also saw the construction of new campuses for the School of Labor Relations and the Colleges of Engineering and Veterinary Medicine as well as other major facilities, including the Arecibo Observatory and Lynah Rink. Though a social conservative, Malott was publicly very critical of McCarthyism; he saw it as a major threat to academic freedom.

After his retirement from Cornell, he would go on to serve on the boards of B.F. Goodrich, Owens-Corning, and General Mills.

== Sources ==
Archives and records

- Deane Waldo Malott papers at Baker Library Special Collections, Harvard Business School.

Academic offices
Preceded by Cornelis W. de Kiewiet (acting)	President of Cornell University; 1951–1963	Next: James A. Perkins
