= Andrei Marmor =

Israeli philosopher

Andrei Marmor אנדריי מרמור
- Born: 1959 (age 66–67)
- Spouse: Elizabeth Garrett

Education
- Education: Tel Aviv University (LLB); University of Oxford (DPhil)

Philosophical work
- Era: 21st-century philosophy
- Region: Western philosophy
- Institutions: Cornell University, University of Southern California

Andrei Marmor (Hebrew: אנדריי מרמור; born 1959) is an Israeli philosopher and Jacob Gould Schurman Professor of Philosophy and Law at Cornell University. Previously he was Professor of Philosophy and Maurice Jones Jr Professor of Law at the University of Southern California. Marmor is the founding editor of the Journal of Ethics and Social Philosophy. He is known for his works on philosophy of law.

== Books ==
- Interpretation and Legal Theory, Oxford University Press, the Clarendon Law Series (1992). Revised Second Edition, Hart Publishing (2005)
- editor, Law and Interpretation: Essays in Legal Philosophy, Oxford University Press (1995)
- Positive Law & Objective Values, Oxford University Press (2001)
- Law in the Age of Pluralism, Oxford University Press (2007)
- Social Conventions: from language to law, Princeton University Press (2009)
- Philosophy of Law, Princeton University Press (2011)
- editor, with S. Soames, Philosophical Foundations of Language in the Law, Oxford University Press (2011)
- editor, The Routledge Companion to Philosophy of Law, Routledge Philosophy Companions (2012)
- The Language of Law, Oxford University Press (2014)
- Foundations of Institutional Reality, Oxford University Press (2023)
