= David C. Knapp =

American educational administrator

David C. Knapp (November 13, 1927 – April 13, 2010) was an American educational administrator.

== Biography ==
Knapp was born in Syracuse, New York, in 1927, and received his B.A. in political science from Syracuse University in 1947. He entered the University of Chicago; earning his M.A. in 1948. Knapp served in the U.S. Army's Second Armored Division in Ft. Hood, Texas and West Germany from 1950 to 1952 and returned to Chicago to complete his Ph.D. in political science in 1953.

Knapp joined the faculty of the University of New Hampshire in 1953 as an assistant professor of government. From 1955 to 1961, he assumed the duties of assistant to the president and associate professor. He served as Dean of the College of Liberal Arts at UNH from 1961–1962. While at UNH, he took leaves as a Fulbright Scholar in Finland and a Bullard Fellow at Harvard University.

In 1963, Knapp became associate director of the Study of American Colleges of Agriculture. The study was financed by the Carnegie Corporation, and was based at the University of Maryland, College Park. While still working on the study, Knapp became director of the Institute of College & University Administrators of the American Council on Education. He left both posts in 1968 to accept an appointment as dean of the New York State College of Home Economics. He proposed changing its name to the New York State College of Human Ecology, and Knapp was the first male to hold the post, a position he held until being appointed Cornell University provost in 1974 under President Dale Corson. Knapp addressed reductions in state funding, campus activism, and the expanding expectations of women students. He organized the merger of the Human Ecology College with a separate Graduate School of Nutrition.

== University of Massachusetts ==
In 1978, Knapp left Cornell to become president of the University of Massachusetts where he served until 1990. As president of UMass from 1978 to 1990, Knapp worked to improve the university's academic reputation and expand its role in economic development and international relations. In his inaugural address, he stated that the American people had created a social compact with higher education to improve the condition of society, and during his presidency he sought to renew the social purpose of the university after more than a decade of internal turmoil.

Under his leadership, UMass worked to support the growth of technology industries in the Commonwealth by establishing a Polymer Science Research Center and the Massachusetts Biotechnology Research Institute. Knapp made the university a distant learning pioneer by creating the Massachusetts Corporation for Educational Telecommunications. After a decade as president, Knapp organized a commission on the university's future. The Commission's recommendations led to consolidating two other public universities into the UMass system, expanding the system from three to five campuses.

Knapp also sought to enhance the university's international profile by strengthening existing relationships with universities in Japan and Germany, and developing new relationships with Russia and China. He also broadened the university's long-standing ties with Japan's Hokkaido University into a sister state agreement between Massachusetts and Hokkaido. For this effort, he was awarded the Order of the Rising Sun by the Emperor of Japan in 1990. He also was awarded the Staufer Medal by the government of Baden-Württemberg in 1992 for his efforts to promote development and trade between Massachusetts and Baden-Württemberg.

== After retirement ==
After his retirement as president of UMass in 1990, Knapp was named president emeritus of the university and served as the Ralph Waldo Emerson Professor until 1993. During his retirement, Knapp served on the governing boards of several organizations, including:

- New England Board of Higher Education 1987–2006, Chair 1998–2000
- Massachusetts Hokkaido Association 1987–2000, Chair 1987–1993
- Japan Society of Boston 1994–2000, President 1996–2000
- Renaissance Charter School of Boston 1994–2005, Chair 1994–2000
- Marlboro Music Festival 2000–2010

Academic offices
Preceded by Robert Plane	Provost of Cornell University; 1974 – 1978	Succeeded by W. Keith Kennedy
