= Peter E. Nathan =

Peter E. Nathan (born April 18, 1935) was an acting President of the University of Iowa, serving in 1995. Prior to that, he served as Provost of the University of Iowa from 1993 to 1995. Nathan received his B.A. in Social Relations from Harvard College in 1957 and his Ph.D. in Clinical Psychology from Washington University in St. Louis in 1962. Nathan has been The University of Iowa Foundation Distinguished Professor of Psychology at the university since 1990.

Academic offices
Preceded by Hunter R. Rawlings III	Acting President of the University of Iowa; 1995	Succeeded by Mary Sue Coleman
