= Barbara Di Eugenio =

Italian-American computer scientist

Barbara Di Eugenio is an Italian-American computer scientist, the Collegiate Warren S. McCulloch Professor of Computer Science at the University of Illinois Chicago. Her research focuses on natural language processing and its applications to human–computer interaction, educational technology, and artificial intelligence in healthcare.

== Education and career ==
Di Eugenio is originally from Turin. After an undergraduate education in Italy, she completed her Ph.D. in computer and information science in 1993 at the University of Pennsylvania. Her dissertation, Understanding Natural Language Instructions: A Computational Approach to Purpose Clauses, was supervised by Bonnie Webber.

She became a faculty member at the University of Illinois Chicago in 1999, and at that time was the only woman faculty member in the Department of Electrical Engineering and Computer Science.

== Recognition ==
In 2022, Di Eugenio received the Zenith Award of the Association for Women in Science. She was named as a Fellow of the Association for Computational Linguistics in 2023, "for outstanding contributions to natural language generation; intelligent tutoring systems; discourse; intercoder agreement; and applying multimodal interactive systems to health".
