= Robert A. Plane =

American chemist (1927–2018)

Robert Allen Plane (1927 – August 6, 2018) was an American retired chemistry professor and college administrator. He served as Provost of Cornell University from 1969 to 1973 and president and chief executive officer of Clarkson University from 1974 until 1985. From 1991 to 1995, he was president of Wells College.

Plane graduated from Evansville College (now called University of Evansville) in Indiana in 1948 with a bachelor's degree, and from the University of Chicago in 1951 with a doctorate.

== Books ==
- Chemistry by Michell J. Sienko and Robert A. Plane (Hardcover - Jun 1974)
- Elements of Inorganic Chemistry (The Physical inorganic chemistry series) by Robert A Plane (1965)
- The Quality of Life Nineteen Essays of Cornell Faculty by Stuart M., Jr., James H. Clancy, et al.; Brady, Hans A., Robert A. Plane, Urie Bronfenbrenner, Allan P. Sindler, et al. Brown (Hardcover - 1968)
- Wine Acidity: Taste, Measurement, Control (American Wine Society manual) by Robert A Plane (1983)

Academic offices
Preceded by Dale Corson	Provost of Cornell University; 1969 – 1973	Succeeded by David C. Knapp
