= Mary Sue Coleman =

American businesswoman, university president

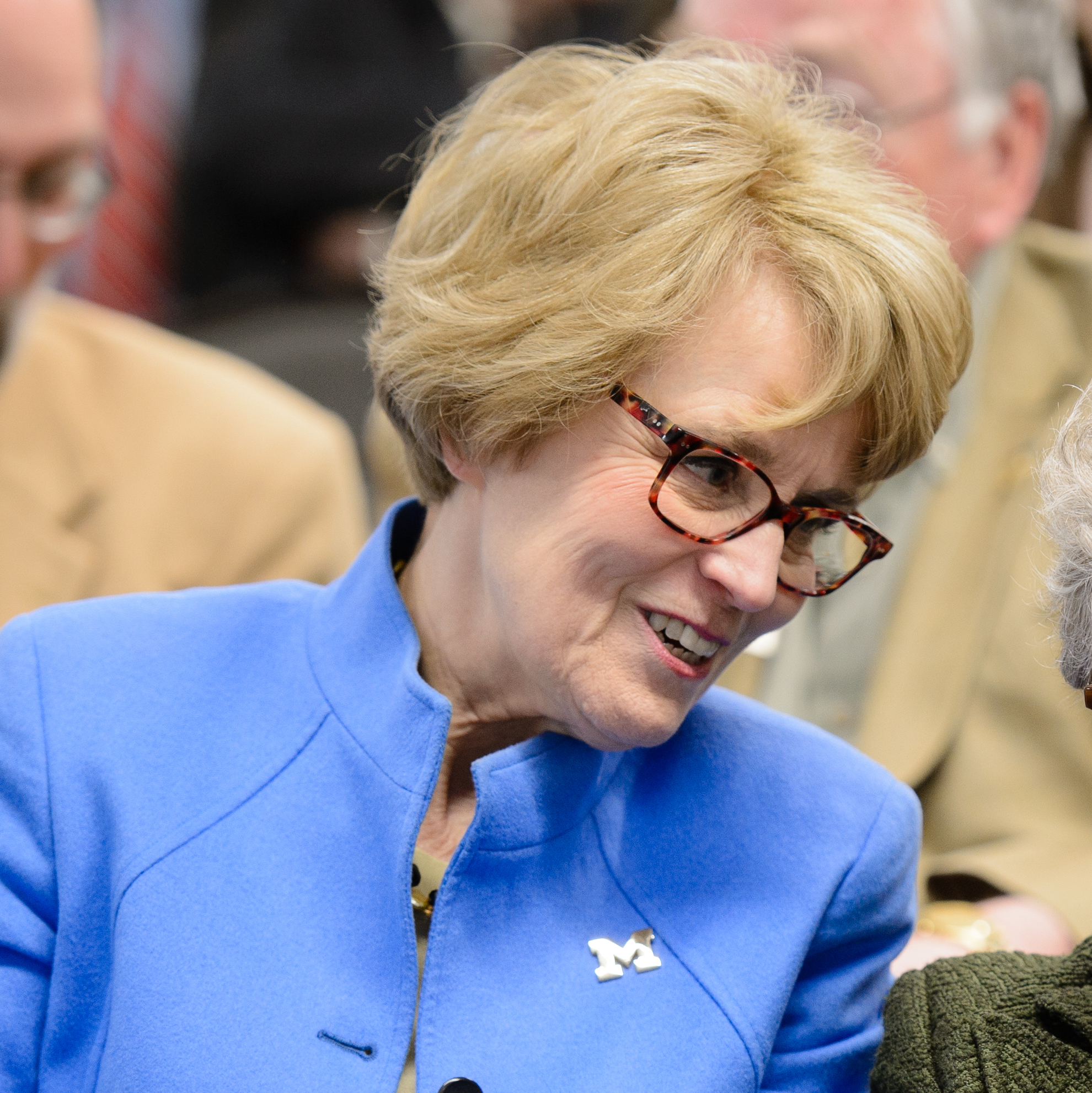

13th President of the University of Michigan
- Interim; January 15, 2022 – October 13, 2022
- Preceded by: Mark Schlissel
- Succeeded by: Santa Ono
- In office August 1, 2002 – July 1, 2014
- Preceded by: Lee Bollinger
- Succeeded by: Mark Schlissel

7th President of the Association of American Universities
- In office June 1, 2016 – May 31, 2020
- Preceded by: Hunter R. Rawlings III
- Succeeded by: Barbara Snyder

18th President of the University of Iowa
- In office 1995–2002
- Preceded by: Hunter R. Rawlings III
- Succeeded by: David J. Skorton

Personal details
- Born: Mary Sue Wilson; October 2, 1943 (age 83) Madison County, Kentucky, U.S.
- Spouse: Ken Coleman
- Education: Grinnell College (BS); University of North Carolina at Chapel Hill (MS, PhD)
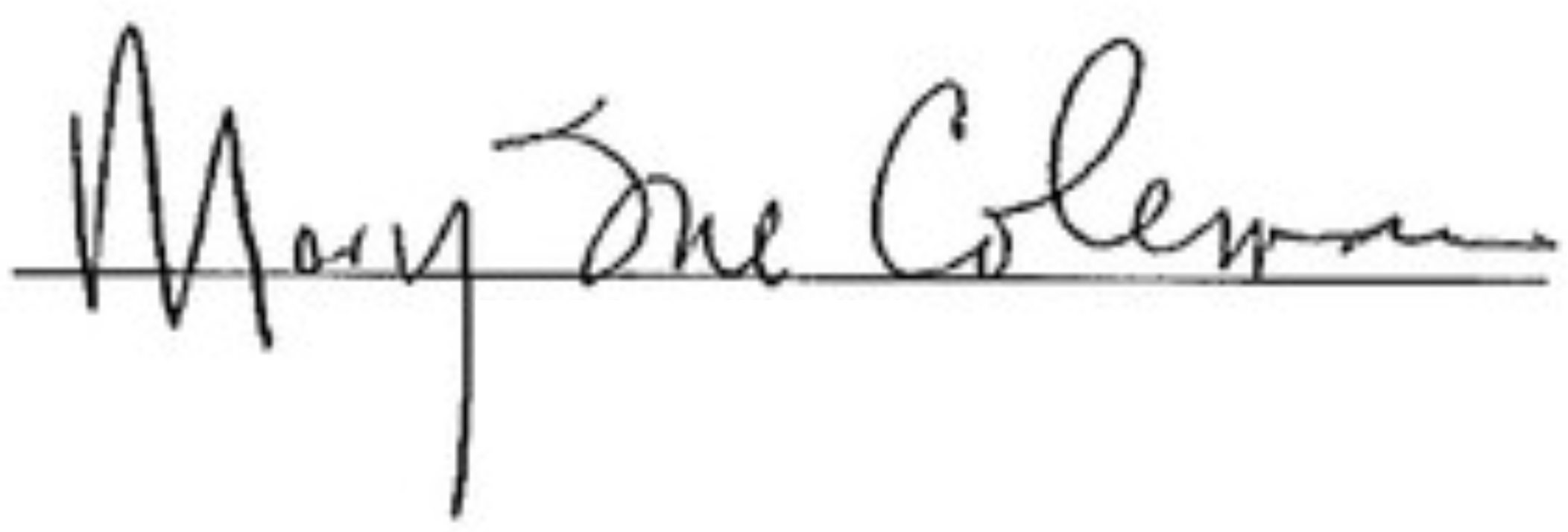
- Signature
- Scientific career
- Fields: Biochemistry
- Workplaces: University of Kentucky; University of North Carolina; University of New Mexico; University of Iowa; University of Michigan
- Thesis: Incorporation of radioactive precursors into polysomes and RNA of mammalian brain during short term behavioral experiences (1969)
- Doctoral advisor: John Eric Wilson

Mary Sue Wilson Coleman (born October 2, 1943) is an American chemist and academic administrator who served the University of Michigan as the 13th president from 2002 to 2014 and as interim president from January to October 2022.

She served as professor of biological chemistry in the University of Michigan Medical School and as professor of chemistry in the College of Literature, Science and the Arts. Before coming to the University of Michigan in 2002, she served as the 18th president of the University of Iowa from 1995 to 2002.

== Early life and education ==
Mary Sue Wilson was born on October 2, 1943, in Madison County, Kentucky. She graduated from a high school in Cedar Falls, Iowa.

Coleman received a Bachelor of Science with a major in chemistry from Grinnell College in 1965 and a Doctor of Philosophy in biochemistry from the University of North Carolina at Chapel Hill in 1969.

== Career ==
Coleman was on the biochemistry faculty at the University of Kentucky for nineteen years. She served as the 18th President of the University of Iowa from 1995 to 2002. Coleman joined the board of directors of the Meredith Corporation in 1997.

Coleman was appointed 13th president of the University of Michigan in August 2002. She joined the Board of Directors of Johnson & Johnson in 2003. Coleman began leading "The Michigan Difference" fundraising campaign for the University of Michigan in 2004; the campaign raised $3.2 billion, setting a record for a public university. Time magazine ranked Coleman as one of the ten best American university presidents in 2009, citing her success in fundraising and her emphasis on research. In July 2010, U.S. Commerce Secretary Gary Locke appointed her as the co-chair of National Advisory Council on Innovation and Entrepreneurship. Coleman announced her retirement as President of the University of Michigan, effective July 1, 2014.

Coleman was appointed to the University of Denver Board of Trustees in June 2015. She is an elected Fellow of the American Academy of Arts and Sciences and co-chaired the Academy's Lincoln Project on Excellence and Access in Public Higher Education Project with former University of California, Berkeley chancellor Robert Birgeneau. Coleman served as president of the Association of American Universities from 2016 to 2020.

Coleman was honored by the University of Michigan with the March 2021 dedication of the building that houses the Life Sciences Institute as the Mary Sue Coleman Hall, the first academic building on the Ann Arbor campus to be named for a woman. Coleman was appointed interim president of the University of Michigan on January 15, 2022, upon the termination of Mark Schlissel by the Board of Regents. She remained in the post until Santa Ono took the office on October 14, 2022.

== Honors and awards ==
Coleman received honorary doctorate from a number of higher education institutions:

- Doctor of Science, University of Kentucky (2003)
- Doctor of Science, Grinnell College (2004)
- Honorary Doctorate, Shanghai Jiao Tong University, China (2004)
- Doctor of Science, Dartmouth College (2005)
- Doctor of Science, University of Notre Dame (2007)
- Doctor of Laws, University of North Carolina at Chapel Hill (2011)
- Doctor of Science, Eastern Kentucky University (2012)
- Doctor of Humane Letters, Indiana University (2013)
- Doctor of Law, Michigan State University (2013)
- Doctor of Science, Brandeis University (2018)
- Doctor of Science, University of Iowa (2019)
- Doctor of Humane Letters, University of Michigan (2023)

== Personal life ==
She married Kenneth Coleman and they have one son.

Academic offices
Preceded by Peter E. Nathan; Acting	18th President of the University of Iowa; 1995–2002	Succeeded by Willard L. Boyd; Acting
Preceded by B. Joseph White; Acting	13th President of the University of Michigan; 2002–2014	Succeeded by Mark S. Schlissel
Preceded by Mark S. Schlissel	President of the University of Michigan; 2022; Acting	Succeeded by Santa Ono
