= Michael Kotlikoff =

American veterinarian and academic

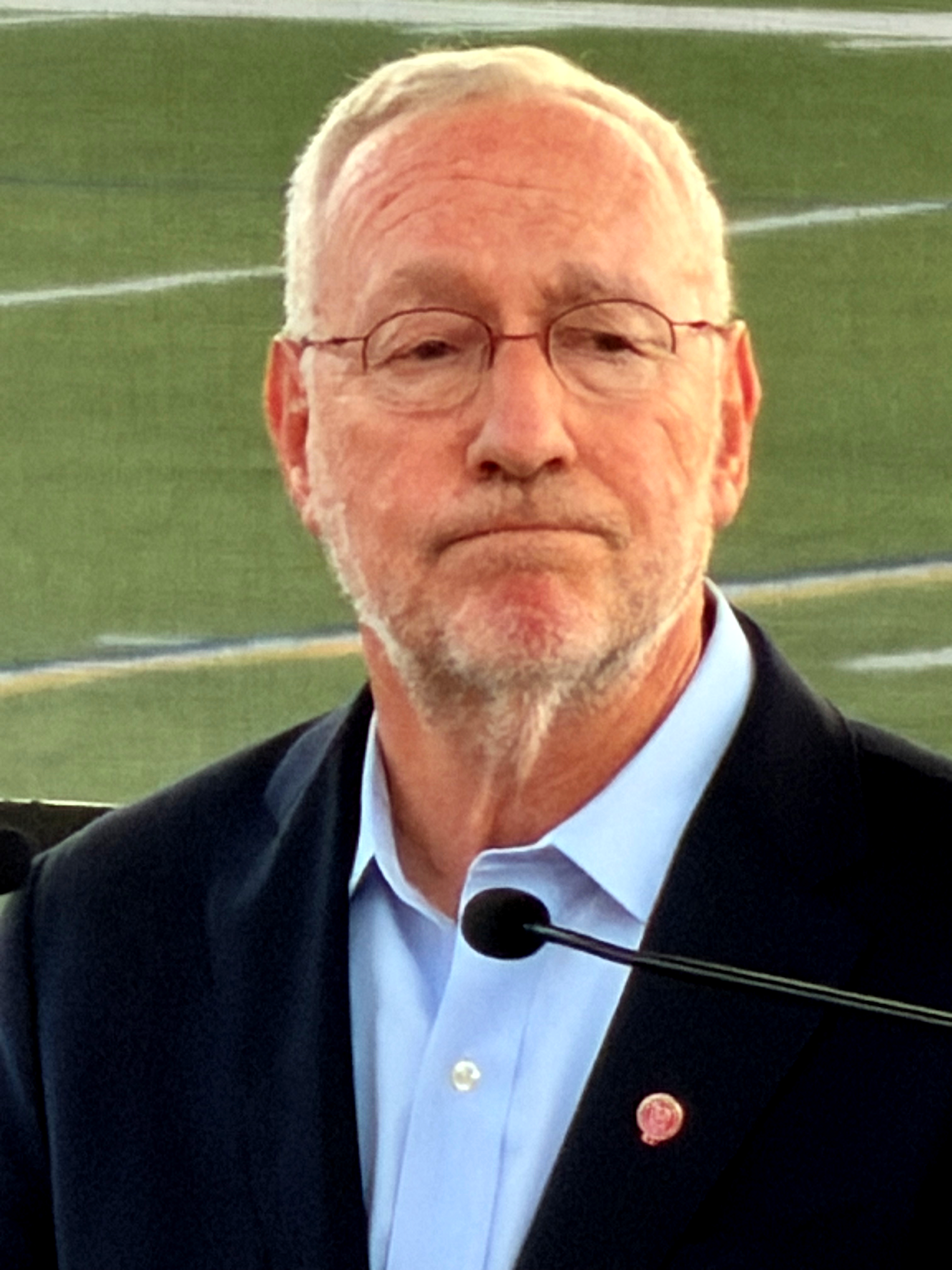
- Kotlikoff in 2026

15th President of Cornell University
- Incumbent
- Assumed office July 1, 2024; Acting: July 1, 2024 – March 21, 2025
- Preceded by: Martha Pollack
- In office March 6, 2016 – April 25, 2016; Acting
- Preceded by: Elizabeth Garrett
- Succeeded by: Hunter R. Rawlings III

Personal details
- Born: 1951 (age 74–75)
- Education: University of Pennsylvania (BA, DVM); University of California, Davis (PhD)
- Scientific career
- Fields: Anatomy and physiology
- Thesis: Dynamic mechanical properties of the canine trachea in situ (impedance, propagation) (1984)

Michael I. Kotlikoff is an American biomedical researcher and veterinarian who has been the president of Cornell University since March 2025. He served as interim President from July 1, 2024. He was the provost of Cornell from 2015 to 2024. Since 1986, his academic research on cardiovascular biology, optogenetics, mouse genetics, and ion channel function has been funded by the National Institutes of Health.

== Early life and education ==
Kotlikoff was born and raised in a Jewish family in Pennsauken, New Jersey. His father, along with his uncles, ran a clothing business, and his mother worked as a secretary at the University of Pennsylvania in Philadelphia.

He received a Bachelor of Arts with a major in literature in 1973 and a Doctor of Veterinary Medicine in 1981, from Penn. He received a Ph.D. in physiology from the University of California, Davis, in 1984.

== Career ==
=== University of Pennsylvania ===
From 1985 to 2000, Kotlikoff worked as a faculty member at the University of Pennsylvania's Veterinary and Medical Schools. From 1996 to 2000, he served as chairman of the university's Department of Animal Biology and director of its Center for Animal Transgenesis and Germ Cell Research from 1998 to 2000. His work helped establish the identity and function of ion channel proteins in muscle cells, and his laboratory helped create and progressively improve Green Fluroescent Protein (GFP)-based optogenetic sensor molecules, termed GCaMPs, and created the first transgenic mouse expressing an optogenetic sensor.

=== Cornell University ===
In 2000, he was recruited by Cornell University in Ithaca, New York, to chair the newly formed Department of Biomedical Sciences, and to chair its Mammalian Genomics Initiative. As chair, Kotlikoff expanded departmental research, oversaw the university's strategy to develop core mouse facilities, and established and oversaw the university transgenesis facility. In 2007, Kotlikoff was appointed dean of Cornell's College of Veterinary Medicine, where he maintained its research laboratory, raised funds, oversaw the renovation of the college's main buildings, expanded research programs, partnered with City University of Hong Kong to establish the Jockey Club College of Veterinary Medicine and Life Sciences, the first accredited veterinary college in Asia. He also supported the expansion of clinical programs, including establishing Cornell's first community-based academic referral practices, Cornell University Veterinary Specialists, and Ruffian Equine Center.

Kotlikoff's laboratory currently works on cardiovascular biology and heart repair, and he leads a National Heart Lung and Blood Resource, the Cornell Heart, Lung, Blood Resource for Optogenetic Mouse Signaling, which develops combinatorial mouse resources for in vivo biology. His laboratory reported development of the first mouse strain to express genetically=encoded Ca2+ sensing molecules and the first in vivo recording of heart cell calcium signaling. In 2007, Kotlikoff's lab demonstrated the limited lineage potential of c-kit+ heart cells using a mouse line they developed expressing green fluorescent proteins in c-kit+ cells. This finding contradicted claims that c-kit+ precursor cells in the heart can act as heart stem cells after injury or isolation and transplantation. Numerous subsequent studies have confirmed these findings. In 2012 they showed that neonatal mammalian heart cells do have the potential to support neomyogenesis following heart infarction shortly after birth.

In 2015, Cornell president Elizabeth Garrett announced Kotlikoff's appointment as Cornell's 16th provost. During Garrett's illness and following her death, Kotlikoff served as Cornell's acting president until April 2016, when Hunter R. Rawlings III was appointed as the university's interim president. As provost, Kotlikoff oversaw the establishment of Cornell's Samuel Curtis Johnson Graduate School of Management, Cornell Computing and Information Science program, Cornell Jeb E. Brooks School of Public Policy, the Cornell Tech campus on Roosevelt Island, reorganization of the social sciences into multi-college departments, and the Cornell Veterans Initiative. In 2020, Kotlikoff and then-President Martha E. Pollack led Cornell's response to the COVID-19 pandemic, which included a university-wide diagnostic program driven by epidemiologic data, and resulted in one of the open residential campuses being able to host in-person classes and experiencing low level of infection.

=== President of Cornell University ===
On July 1, 2024, following the retirement of Cornell University president Martha E. Pollack as the university's 14th president, Kotlikoff began a two-year term as interim president of Cornell University.

On March 21, 2025, Kotlikoff was formally appointed as Cornell University's 15th president.

In April, following protests on campus against the Gaza genocide, the Trump administration froze $1 billion of federal funding for Cornell, following allegations of antisemitism and accusations of racial discrimination due to the school's efforts to promote diversity. On November 7, 2025, Kotlikoff announced that the school had settled with the administration for $60 million to be paid out over three years, half of which the university agreed to invest into U.S. agriculture research, and half of which will be paid directly to the federal government "as a condition for ending pending claims that have been brought against the university." The government also agreed to "restore terminated federal grants, release all withheld funds for active grants, and consider Cornell fully eligible for new grants and funding awards, without disadvantage or preference."

==== Driving incident ====
On April 30, 2026, Cornell held and organized debate on the Israel-Palestine conflict and the Gaza war, featuring guest speaker Norman Finkelstein, at which Kotlikoff delivered the opening remarks. Following the debate, on the walk from Goldwin Smith Hall to the parking lot at Day Hall, Kotlikoff was questioned by a small group of Students for a Democratic Cornell (SDC) members who asked him about freedom of speech and the school's Expressive Activity Policy, which imposes significant limitations on students' ability to protest, and expressed concerns about suspensions of student demonstrators. Although Kotlikoff largely did not answer, the students continued questioning him as he entered his car. Kotlikoff accelerated his vehicle into one student and, after hitting him, turned and rolled over another student's foot before driving away. In a later university statement emailed to students, faculty, and staff, Kotlikoff claimed that students were "banging on [the car's] windows" and "shouting". Video evidence of the incident published by the Cornell Daily Sun showed that both of these claims were false. The student whose foot had been run over said he had been too fearful of retaliation to press charges "considering Michael Kotlikoff is the boss of CUPD". SDC later told the Cornell Daily Sun that "there was no attempt to intimidate Kotlikoff, physically or verbally and students consistently remained a safe distance away from him.”

In response to this incident, the Cornell Chapter of the American Association of University Professors called for an independent investigation. The executive board of the Cornell Graduate Students Union and its affiliated labor union, the UE Local 2300, called on Kotlikoff to resign.

On May 15, an investigation conducted by the Cornell Board of Trustees and the CUPD concluded that no criminal charges were merited against Kotlikoff or the students involved. The investigation also found the students' actions to be "inconsistent with university policies governing expressive activity and our standards for respectful conduct, safety, and the prohibition of intimidation," but stated that university officials would not pursue disciplinary action.

On June 1, 2026, the student whose foot had been run over by Kotlikoff's car, and who had graduated several days prior, was banned from university property for "having restricted a motor vehicle’s ability to maneuver while it was in motion as the reverse lights of the vehicle were illuminated."

==== Response to campus rape allegations ====
On October 3, 2026, Kotlikoff released a statement in response to the 2024 Cornell University rape allegations.

Academic offices
| Preceded by W. Kent Fuchs | Provost of Cornell University; 2015–2024 | Succeeded by John Siliciano; Acting |
| Preceded by Elizabeth Garrett | President of Cornell University; Acting; 2016 | Succeeded by Hunter Rawlings |
| Preceded by Martha Pollack | President of Cornell University; 2024–present Acting: 2024–2025 | Incumbent |
