= Cornell University Center for Advanced Computing =

Frank H.T. Rhodes Hall

The Cornell University Center for Advanced Computing (CAC), housed at Frank H. T. Rhodes Hall on the campus of Cornell University, is one of five original centers in the National Science Foundation's Supercomputer Centers Program. It was formerly called the Cornell Theory Center.

== Establishment ==
The Cornell Theory Center (CTC) was established in 1985 under the direction of Cornell Physics Professor and Nobel Laureate Kenneth G. Wilson. In 1984, the National Science Foundation began work on establishing five new supercomputer centers, including the CTC, to provide high-speed computing resources for research within the United States. In 1985, a team from the National Center for Supercomputing Applications began the development of NSFNet, a TCP/IP-based computer network that could connect to the ARPANET at Cornell University and the University of Illinois at Urbana–Champaign. This high-speed network, unrestricted to academic users, became a backbone to which regional networks would be connected. Initially a 56-kbit/s network, traffic on the network grew exponentially; the links were upgraded to 1.5-Mbit/s T1s in 1988 and to 45 Mbit/s in 1991. The NSFNet was a major milestone in the development of the Internet and its rapid growth coincided with the development of the World Wide Web. In the early 1990s, in addition to support from the National Science Foundation, the CTC received funding from the Advanced Research Projects Agency, the National Institutes of Health, New York State, IBM Corporation, SGI, and members of the center's Corporate Research Institute. The center's focus was on developing scalable parallel computing resources for its user community and applying their expertise in parallel algorithm development and optimization to a wide range of scientific and engineering problems.

== History ==
In 1995, the building that houses what was then known as the Cornell Theory Center was named Frank H. T. Rhodes Hall which currently houses the Cornell University Center for Advanced Computing.

The Cornell University Center for Advanced Computing, and its predecessor the Cornell Theory Center, deployed the first IBM RS/6000 SP supercomputer and first Dell supercomputer, and established a financial solutions center for supercomputing.

Today, CAC is a partner on the National Science Foundation XSEDE project, a collection of integrated digital resources and services enabling open science research. CAC is also developing training for TACC's Frontera supercomputer, serving as the technical lead for the Scalable Cyberinfrastructure Institute for Multi-Messenger Astrophysics (SCiMMA) project, developing software for the Institute for Research and Innovation in Software for High Energy Physics (IRIS-HEP), and designing cyberinfrastructure for the NANOGrav Physics Frontiers Center.

A 175 times faster computation of a CDC hepatitis C model on a CAC MATLAB cloud is noted in the International Data Corporation's What the Exascale Era Can Provide report. CAC was an early implementer of cloud computing with the deployment of Red Cloud. CAC also designed and deployed a federated cloud called Aristotle and builds cloud images and containerizes applications for efficiency and portability.

Under the Office of the Vice Provost for Research, CAC provides Cornell faculty, staff, and students, the national research community, and industry with a range of high performance computing and consulting services. Organizations that have participated in CAC's Partner Program include Boeing, Corning, Dell, Ford, HypoVereinsbank, Intel, Microsoft, Pfizer, and start-ups whose technologies have been acquired. The Center is under the direction of David Lifka and Richard Knepper.

== Building ==
Rhodes Hall is an eight-story building occupying a narrow, triangular site between Hoy Road and Cascadilla Gorge.

In 1989, blueprints and material samples were used to simulate new areas of the building before it was complete. Images of the building's stair tower were computed with a ray tracer using soft shadowing techniques.

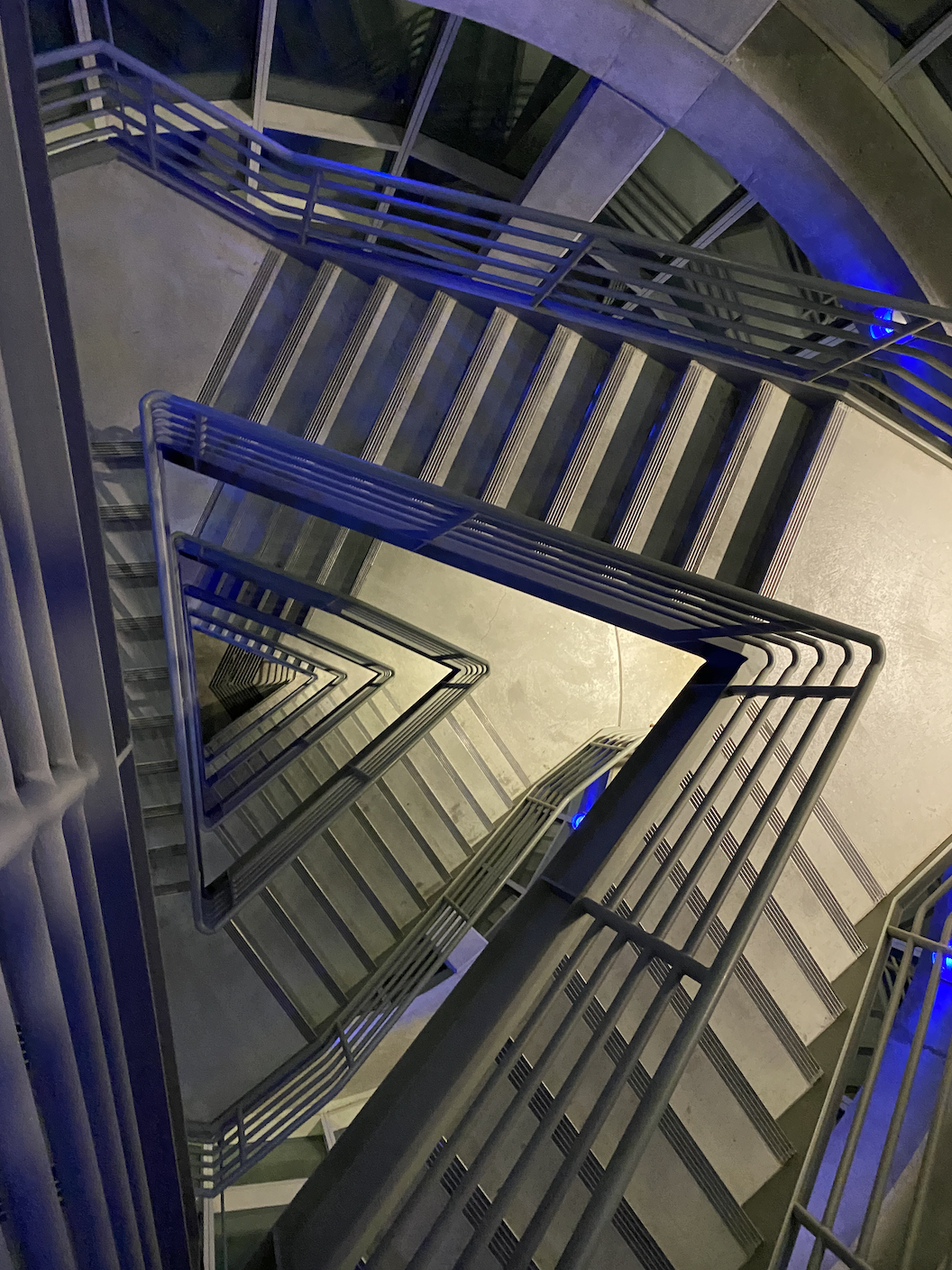
Aerial view of Frank H.T. Rhodes Hall Staircase in 2021.
