= Mark Schlissel =

American academic (born 1957)

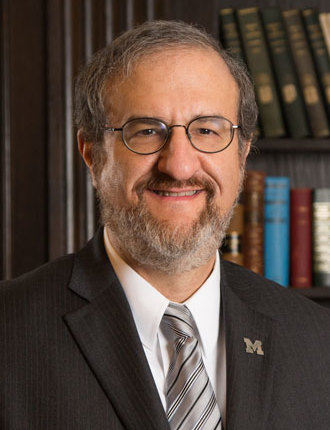
- Schlissel in 2014

14th President of the University of Michigan
- In office July 1, 2014 – January 15, 2022
- Preceded by: Mary Sue Coleman
- Succeeded by: Mary Sue Coleman (interim)

Personal details
- Born: Mark Steven Schlissel; November 24, 1957 (age 68) New York City, U.S.
- Education: Princeton University (BA); Johns Hopkins University (MD-PhD)
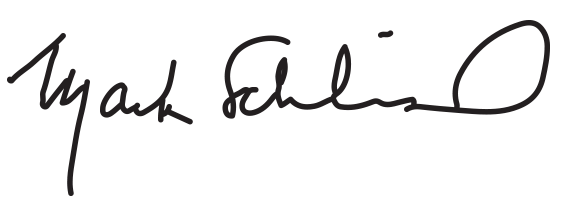
- Signature

Mark Steven Schlissel (born November 24, 1957) is an American medical scientist who served as the 14th president of the University of Michigan from July 2014 to January 2022. On January 15, 2022, he was removed from the office by the Board of Regents for being in "an inappropriate relationship with a University employee."

Schlissel's initial contract with the University of Michigan lasted five years, and he received a second five-year contract, which was due to expire in 2024. He had planned to step down as president in 2023, but was fired by the University of Michigan Board of Regents on January 15, 2022 for interacting with a coworker in a way that was "inconsistent with promoting the dignity and reputation of the University of Michigan". The Regents further alleged that Schlissel was involved "in an inappropriate relationship with a University employee," although they did not specify the nature of the relationship or reveal details of any investigation that led them to that conclusion.

He holds both a professorship of microbiology and immunology and a professorship of internal medicine within the University of Michigan Health System as well as a professorship of molecular, cellular, and developmental biology in the University of Michigan College of Literature, Science, and the Arts.

== Biography ==
Schlissel was born in Brooklyn, New York, in a traditional Jewish household. He was raised in Old Bridge Township, New Jersey, graduating from Madison Central High School in 1975. He was inducted into its Wall of Fame in 2017. Schlissel was named the 14th president of the University of Michigan in 2014, serving in that role until January 2022.

He graduated with a B.A. in biochemical sciences from Princeton University in 1979. He earned his M.D. degree and a Ph.D. in physiological chemistry from the Johns Hopkins School of Medicine in 1986 through the Medical Scientist Training Program. His residency in Internal Medicine was conducted at the Johns Hopkins Hospital from 1986 to 1988. His postdoctoral research fellowship was under David Baltimore at the Massachusetts Institute of Technology, Whitehead Institute.

Previously, Schlissel became a faculty member at the Johns Hopkins School of Medicine in 1991. He moved to the Department of Molecular and Cell Biology at UC Berkeley in 1999 as an associate professor, becoming a full professor in 2002. At UC Berkeley, he served as Dean of Biological Sciences in the College of Letters & Science from 2008 to 2011. In 2011, he became provost at Brown University.

Schlissel is married to Monica Schwebs, an environmental and energy lawyer and his Princeton classmate, and they have four children.

== University presidency ==
=== Hiring and recruitment ===
Schlissel was appointed in 2014, following the retirement of Mary Sue Coleman. Schlissel's appointment was unanimously approved by the Board of Regents in a special meeting on January 24, 2014.

Schlissel was recruited from Brown University, where he was provost from 2011 to 2014 under Ruth Simmons and Christina Paxson. He was offered a $750,000 base salary on a five-year contract, making him the fourth highest paid public university president.

=== Contract extension ===
In 2018, with one year remaining on Schlissel's first five-year contract, the University Regents extended Schlissel's contract for five more years. The decision to extend Schlissel's contract followed an external performance review that credited Schlissel's leadership with Michigan's excellent performance in academic and medical center rankings, in addition to college affordability, fundraising and research funding. Schlissel's contract extension included a 3.5% raise, bringing his base compensation to $852,346.

=== Administrative Initiatives ===
==== Go Blue Guarantee ====
In 2017, Schlissel announced an updated financial aid policy, in which any Michigan student from a family that makes less than $65,000 could attend University of Michigan in Ann Arbor for four years for free. The income cutoff was designed to include all Michigan families below the state median income, to expand access to the education for students who are traditionally under-represented on the Ann Arbor campus. The expanded financial aid program was supported by the $5.2 billion Victors For Michigan fundraising drive begun shortly before Schlissel's inauguration. Although the Victors for Michigan Campaign was expected to raise $4 billion, the campaign successfully raised over $5 billion, including $1.22 billion to expand access and enrich the educational experience for all students.

Two years after starting the Go Blue Guarantee, the University of Michigan saw a 10% increase in applications from Michigan students whose families earn less than $75,000, despite decreasing numbers of Michigan high school graduates since the Go Blue Guarantee took effect. In 2019, two years after the Go Blue Guarantee took effect, approximately 20% of in-state students paid no tuition under the Go Blue Guarantee. Accelerated by the Go Blue Guarantee, the share of the student body who represented the first in their family to go to college increased from 8.7% in Schlissel's first year to 15.3% after the Go Blue Guarantee. In 2021, Schlissel extended the Go Blue Guarantee to students studying at UM Flint and UM Dearborn.

The Go Blue Guarantee is viewed as one of the most successful attempts to increase college access in the country, primarily by advertising college affordability to low- or middle-income families. Since Schlissel piloted the Go Blue Guarantee at the University of Michigan, the program's success has been replicated at many public flagship universities including the University of Virginia and the University of Texas.

Schlissel was recognized by the Jesse Jackson's Rainbow PUSH Automotive Project with the Let Freedom Ring award, in recognition of his contributions to diversity at University of Michigan through the Go Blue Guarantee. Additionally he was named Michiganian of the Year by the Detroit News in recognition of his efforts to promote access to education for Michigan students from diverse backgrounds.

==== Wolverine Pathways ====
To promote student body diversity by expanding the college preparation pipeline, Schlissel formed the Wolverine Pathways extracurricular program for students from school districts that are traditionally underrepresented on the Ann Arbor campus. The Wolverine Pathways program enrolls students in grade seven through 12 from Detroit, Ypsilanti or Southfield school districts, although attendance at public schools is not required for participation. Although the Wolverine Pathways program does not guarantee admission at University of Michigan, any student from the program who is admitted to University of Michigan can attend with a full-tuition four-year scholarship.

Since the wolverine Pathways program began, over 900 students have attended free weekend and summer supplemental coursework in math, English and science, in addition to SAT or ACT exam preparation courses. Students in the Wolverine pathways program have been admitted to top universities, including University of Michigan, Michigan State University, Notre Dame, Ohio State and Morehouse College.

The Wolverine Pathways program was designed to relieve diversity bottlenecks in the college admission pipeline. Research in higher education diversity suggested that the major bottlenecks in diversity occur before the college admissions process, and by reaching students as young as 12 years old, the Wolverine Pathways program was designed to make students aware of higher education opportunities before the students commit to alternative after-high school opportunities. The Wolverine Pathways does not enroll students based on their race, but does operate in school districts whose racial makeup includes more black or Latino students than the statewide average.

==== Michigan Poverty Solutions Center ====
In 2016, Schlissel announced the formation of an interdisciplinary research initiative to study and treat poverty, and named Social Work and Public Policy professor Luke Shaefer as its founding director. The Poverty Solutions Center was established to support faculty and students from any university department with a research idea designed to address local or global poverty, and to provide an infrastructure to support long-term interdisciplinary collaboration and community relationships. Prior to starting the Poverty Solutions Center, the university offered over 100 courses on poverty through several departments, including business, public policy, dentistry, education, nursing, public health and social work. The goal of the Poverty Solutions center was to promote interactions among scholars with unique approaches to studying poverty, and to enable interdisciplinary field experiments for interventions to prevent poverty locally and globally.

==== Michigan Institute for Firearm Injury Prevention ====
In 2019, Schlissel announced the Michigan Institute for Firearm Injury Prevention to fund interdisciplinary research with the ability to limit the harm caused by firearms. The institute includes a $10 million commitment to fund research at the University of Michigan, in addition to educating and training faculty and postdoctoral scholars to study the impacts of firearm violence in Michigan.

==== Biosciences Initiative ====
Schlissel, who was trained as a medical doctor and as a molecular biologist, launched the Biosciences Initiative in 2017 to expand the university's biology research profile in areas of public importance. In its initial period, the Biosciences Initiative committed $150 million to hire up to 30 tenure track faculty members and to support their research. The initiative sought proposals for areas of public importance both inside and outside of health, and in its initial cohort the Biosciences Initiative established research programs in: concussion biology, biology of climate change, natural product-based pharmaceutical discovery, cryo-electron microscopy and RNA-based therapeutics, in addition to several exploratory grants for earlier-phase research. As of 2021, four years after the Biosciences initiative launch, $133 million of the $150 million program had been allocated, in addition to all 30 tenure-track faculty appointments. In parallel with the Biosciences Initiative, Schlissel entered an agreement with Deerfield Management to commercialize biomedical inventions developed at the university, in which Deerfield Management committed $130 million over 10 years to nurture university technology spin-outs. The collaboration, which is structured as an LLC called Great Lakes Discovery, accepts proposals from University of Michigan faculty to accelerate drug candidates from laboratory investigations through their Investigational New Drug designation.

==== Michigan Arts Initiative ====
In 2019, Schlissel announced the formation of the Michigan Arts initiative, to improve student engagement with the arts during their time at the university. In announcing the initiative, Schlissel described his commitment to the arts on campus: "A fundamental notion behind our initiative is the idea that the arts are as essential to a university as they are to life itself... [They are important in] making us excellent, complete and comprehensive; teaching us new ways to visualize, imagine and understand; and taking us far beyond the instrumental value to a place where we can, as this university has always aspired to do, answer the most profound questions applied."

==== International engagement ====
Amid federal scrutiny on potential foreign influence on research in the United States, Schlissel maintained strong relationships with international partner universities during his time as president, including supporting study abroad programs, international data consortia and research collaborations. Schlissel took several major international tours to visit partner institutions and Michigan alumni living abroad, including a trip to mainland China, Hong Kong, Korea and India.

=== Notable controversies ===
==== Free speech and BDS ====
In 2018, John Cheney-Lippold, an associate professor of American culture, at first agreed to write a letter of recommendation for a student, then subsequently reversed his decision when he learned the student hoped to study in Israel, citing human rights concerns and his support for the BDS movement. In response, Cheney-Lippold was denied a planned sabbatical and denied an annual salary raise for one year. The university and Mark Schlissel were criticized for disciplining him, citing a breach of free speech, the right to boycott, and professorial independence. In response to the episode, Schlissel articulated that he believes that a professor should not substitute their personal political beliefs for that of their students: "Withholding recommendations that an instructor would otherwise be willing to provide based on the instructor’s personal or political views fails to meet expectations for supporting our students. Such a denial, in essence, has the potential to deny students opportunities they have earned and put decision-making about a student’s aspirations in the hands of someone other than the student."

==== Undergraduate tuition ====
Under Schlissel, the University of Michigan's tuition has risen to the highest of any American public university. During Schlissel's tenure, because of heavy investments in financial aid, most in-state undergraduate students saw no net change in tuition, despite rising costs of higher education nationally.

==== COVID-19 response ====
During the COVID-19 pandemic, Schlissel and other administrators were criticized for their plans and policies to reopen the University of Michigan for the Fall 2020 semester. Criticisms from faculty, staff, and students included the administration's lack of transparency about its plans to safely reopen the campus. Beginning in July 2020, a leaked memo to Schlissel from the university Ethics and Privacy Committee spread around campus, asserting that the administration's reopening plans did not meet safety guidelines. Additionally, rumors and speculation circulated around the university, including an anonymously authored op-ed in The Michigan Daily which made the claim that a member of the board of regents had influenced the university's reopening decision because he stood to profit from a return to in-person classes. The claim could not be substantiated, and the regent in question denied the allegations.

On September 8, 2020, the university's graduate student employee union authorized a work stoppage because of concerns with Schlissel's reopening plans and policies. It was the union's first strike since 1975. On September 9, more than 100 resident advisors went on strike at the university. Among their demands, the Graduate Employees Union demanded that funding for campus police be reduced by 50%, and that the university stop all collaboration with local Ann Arbor police. On September 14, Schlissel announced that the university was taking legal action to force striking university workers, whose contracts included a "no-strike" clause, to return to work. On September 16, faced with impending legal action against the union, the graduate student union membership voted to accept a deal from university, ending the strike and returning to work the following day.

On September 16, 2020, the University of Michigan Faculty Senate convened to consider a motion of no confidence in the university's response to the COVID-19 pandemic and Schlissel's leadership. While the motion concerning the pandemic response failed to pass with 915 in favor, 991 against, and 198 recorded abstentions, the motion of no confidence in Schlissel's leadership passed by a margin of four votes, with 957 in favor, 953 against, and 184 recorded abstentions. It was the first time in the University of Michigan's history that a no confidence motion had passed against a president. However, the motion was largely symbolic because Schlissel was accountable to the board of regents, not the faculty senate. The following day, the board of regents unanimously voiced support for Schlissel and the administration's handling of the pandemic and the university's reopening.

==== Firing ====
On December 8, 2021, via an anonymous complaint, the board of regents of the University of Michigan were informed that Schlissel may have been involved in an inappropriate relationship with a university employee. On December 23, 2021, the university signed a contract with law firm Jenner & Block to aid in the investigation. The university published the contract with the law firm describing the scope of work. After an investigation, they learned that over a period of years, Schlissel used his university email account to communicate with that subordinate in a manner deemed "inconsistent with the dignity and reputation of the University". The university provided a 118-page document with examples of the email communications discovered as part of the investigation. Many University students reacted on social media and posted memes based on the e-mails published from the investigation.

On January 15, 2022, Schlissel was fired as president of the University of Michigan by the university's board of regents. He had earlier negotiated early retirement with a final annual salary of $927,000; but "that 'golden parachute' contract is now void because Schlissel was fired for cause". The university never released a report about the episode, or provided details about their efforts to investigate Schlissel's conduct. Between the time that Schlissel's contract was renewed in 2018 and the time that he was dismissed, three new regents were elected, and the relationship between Schlissel and the board had deteriorated significantly. According to press reports, two regents who were recently elected in the contentious 2018 midterm elections were among Schlissel's harshest critics on the board, whereas several longer-serving regents were more supportive. Although the University of Michigan regents are expected to publicly review Schlissel's performance every September, the Regents never publicly reviewed Schlissel's job performance in the year leading up to his public dismissal, and the underlying reasons for tension between Schlissel and the Board have never been fully reported.

On April 6, 2022, Schlissel wrote an apology letter as part of settlement reached with the University of Michigan. The settlement requires that Schlissel take a one year leave of absence with a $463,000 annual salary. He can return to his tenured faculty position with an annual salary of $185,000. The university will deposit $300,000 into Schlissel's retirement account, as well as an additional $162,000 into another retirement account.

Academic offices
Preceded by David I. Kertzer	11th Provost of Brown University; 2011–2014	Succeeded by Vicki Leigh Colvin
Preceded by Mary Sue Coleman	14th President of the University of Michigan; 2014–2022	Succeeded by Mary Sue Coleman
