= Sanford Soverhill Atwood =

American biologist & academic administrator (1912–2002)

Sanford Soverhill Atwood (1912 – December 2, 2002) was an American scientist with a specialty in cell biology & plant breeding and academic administrator.

Born in Janesville, Wisconsin, Atwood earned his bachelors, masters and Phd from the University of Wisconsin–Madison. He worked as a Professor of Plant Breeding at Cornell University, and then served as Cornell's Provost. He left Cornell to become president of Emory University, where he served from 1963 to 1977. Under his administration, Emory's faculty size doubled, the student body grew by over 60%, invited Emory's first African American commencement speaker (Benjamin Mays) and first woman commencement speaker (Rosemary Park) and famously stood by Professor Thomas J. J. Altizer after his controversial writings.

Academic offices
Preceded by Forrest F. Hill	Provost of Cornell University; 1955 – 1963	Succeeded by Dale R. Corson
