= James Alfred Perkins =

Seventh president of Cornell University (1911-1998)

7th President of Cornell University
- In office 1963–1969
- Preceded by: Deane Waldo Malott
- Succeeded by: Dale R. Corson

Personal details
- Born: October 11, 1911 Philadelphia, Pennsylvania, U.S.
- Died: August 19, 1998 (aged 86) Burlington, Vermont, U.S.
- Relatives: Courtland D. Perkins (brother)
- Education: Swarthmore College (BA); Princeton University (PhD)

James Alfred Perkins (October 11, 1911 – August 19, 1998) was an American academic administrator who was the seventh president of Cornell University, from 1963 to 1969.

== Early life and education ==
Perkins was born on October 11, 1911, in Philadelphia. He attended Swarthmore College in Swarthmore, Pennsylvania, and graduated with honors in 1934. At Swarthmore, Perkins joined the Delta Upsilon fraternity and played college football alongside his classmate, DU brother and future 1972 Nobel Prize laureate Christian B. Anfinsen.

In 1937, he received a doctorate in political science from Princeton University.

== Career ==
From 1937 to 1941, he was a faculty member at Princeton University. After service in the Office of Price Administration and the Foreign Economic Administration during World War II, he was appointed vice president of Swarthmore University in Swarthmore, Pennsylvania, where he served from 1945 to 1950. In 1950, he joined the Carnegie Corporation, an educational foundation.

=== U.S. Department of Defense ===
In 1951–1952, on leave from Carnegie Corporation, he served as deputy chairman of the Research and Development Board at the United States Department of Defense. At Carnegie, he chaired President John F. Kennedy's Advisory Panel on a National Academy of Foreign Affairs, sat on the General Advisory Committee of the Arms Control and Disarmament Agency, the U.S. Committee for UNESCO, and the Board of Trustees of the RAND Corporation, and headed the Rockefeller Brothers Fund committee that produced the report The Power of the Democratic Idea.

=== Cornell University president ===
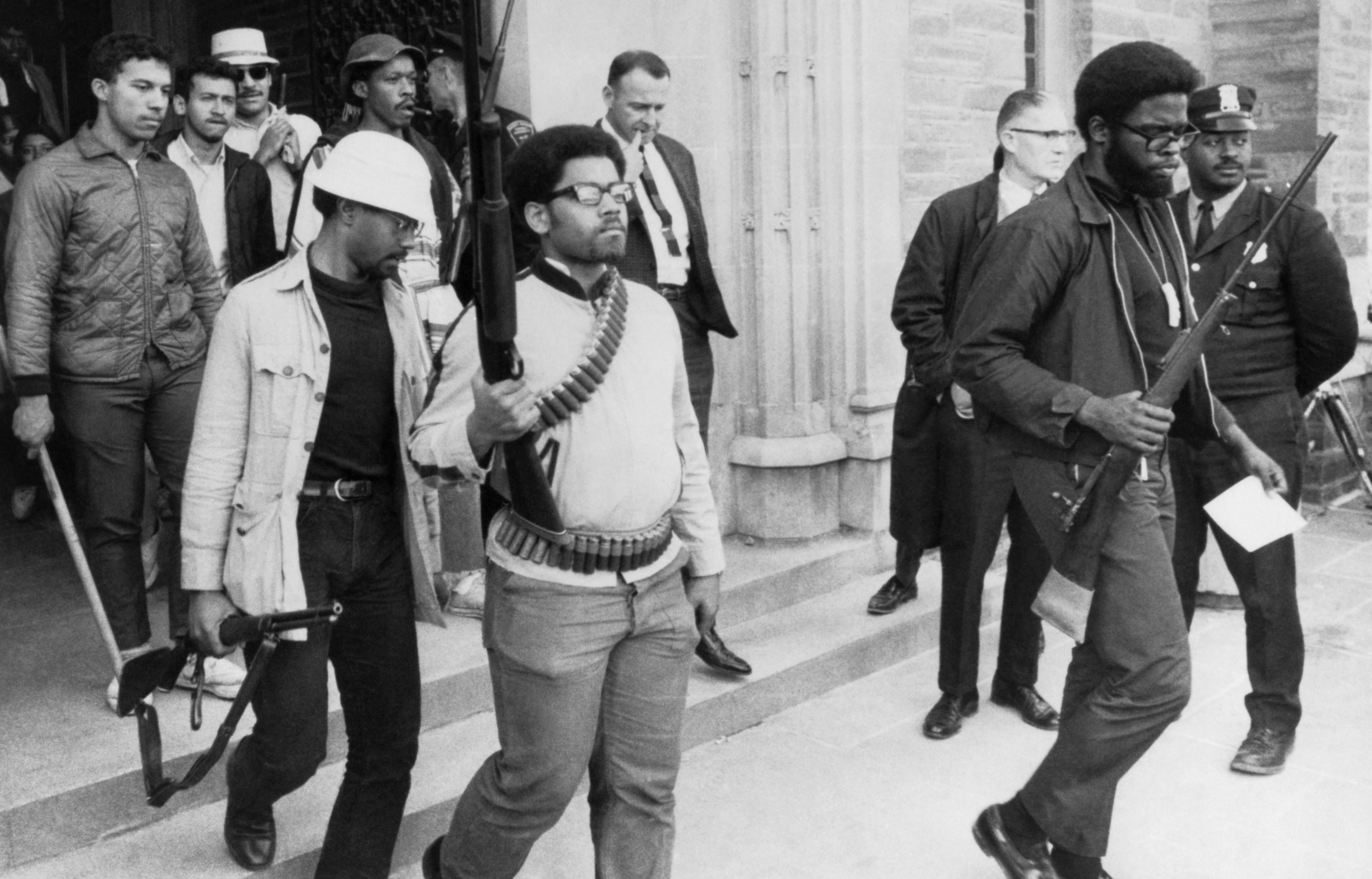
Armed African American Vietnam War student protesters exiting Willard Straight Hall at Cornell University after negotiating an end to their occupation of the building; the occupation led to Perkins' resignation as president of the university. The following year, in 1970, Steve Starr, the Associated Press photographer who took the photo, was awarded the Pulitzer Prize for it.

On October 4, 1963, Perkins was appointed president of Cornell University. On May 31, 1969, he resigned as Cornell president after Willard Straight Hall on the Cornell campus was occupied by armed African American students protesting U.S. involvement in the Vietnam War. In 1995, Thomas W. Jones, a trustee of the university who had been a leader of the building occupation, established the James A. Perkins Prize for Interracial Understanding and Harmony in his name.

=== Organizational leadership and publications ===
He was a member of the Carnegie Commission on Higher Education from 1967 to 1973, and after leaving Cornell, founded the International Council for Educational Development in Princeton, New Jersey. In 1978 he was appointed chairman of President Carter's Commission on Foreign Language and International Studies. He was a member of the Steering Committee of the Bilderberg Group.

Perkins' publications include The University in Transition (1966), a series of three lectures in which he argued that a university must balance its three missions of research, teaching, and public service. He died in Burlington, Vermont, of complications after a fall while in the Adirondacks.

== In popular culture ==
In an episode of The Office, Andy Bernard mentions Perkins while conducting an admissions interview of his co-worker.

== Notes ==
Academic offices
Preceded by Deane Waldo Malott	President of Cornell University; 1963–1969	Succeeded by Dale R. Corson
