= Martha Pollack =

American computer scientist

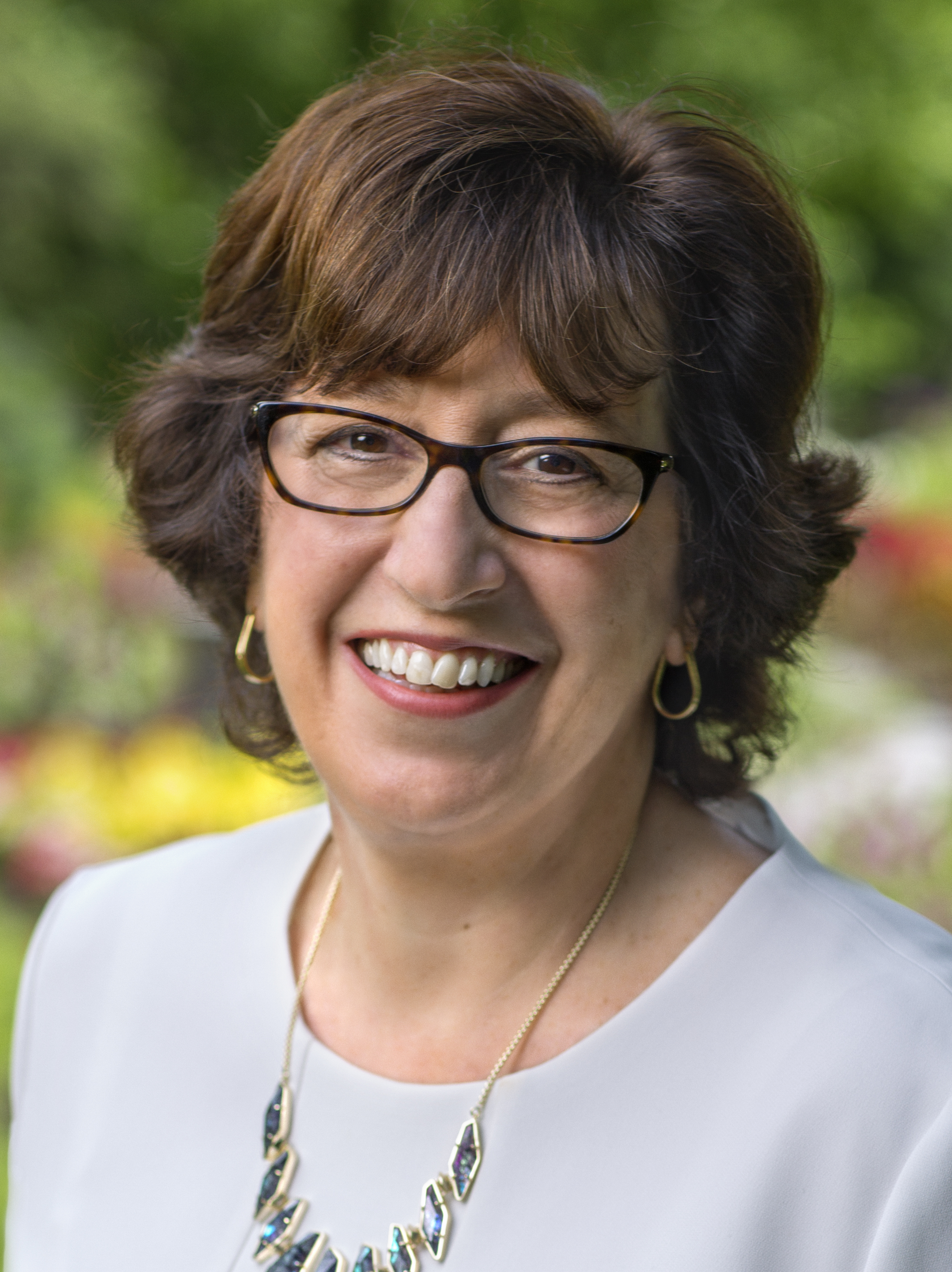
- Pollack in 2017

14th President of Cornell University
- In office April 17, 2017 – June 30, 2024
- Preceded by: Elizabeth Garrett
- Succeeded by: Michael Kotlikoff

14th Provost of the University of Michigan
- In office 2013–2017
- Preceded by: Philip J. Hanlon
- Succeeded by: Martin Philbert

Personal details
- Born: Martha Elizabeth Pollack; August 27, 1958 (age 68) Stamford, Connecticut, U.S.
- Spouse: Ken Gottschlich
- Education: Dartmouth College (BA); University of Pennsylvania (MA, PhD)

Academic background
- Thesis: Inferring domain plans in question-answering (1986)
- Doctoral advisor: Bonnie Webber

Academic work
- Discipline: Artificial intelligence
- Institutions: SRI International; University of Pittsburgh; University of Michigan; Cornell University

Martha Elizabeth Pollack (born August 27, 1958) is an American computer scientist. She served as the 14th president of Cornell University from April 2017 to June 2024 and as the 14th provost and executive vice president for academic affairs at the University of Michigan from 2013 to 2017.

Pollack's research specialty is artificial intelligence, where her contributions include works in planning, natural language processing, and activity recognition for cognitive assistance. She also serves on the board of directors of IBM.

== Early life and education ==
Pollack was born in Stamford, Connecticut, on August 27, 1958.

In 1979, Pollack completed her undergraduate studies in linguistics at Dartmouth College. She received master's and doctoral degrees in computer science from the University of Pennsylvania, completing a Doctor of Philosophy in 1986 under joint supervision of Bonnie Webber and Barbara J. Grosz. She is Jewish.

== Career ==
Pollack worked at SRI International from 1985 to 1992. From 1991 to 2000, she was on the faculty of the University of Pittsburgh.

=== University of Michigan ===
In 2000, Pollack joined the faculty of the University of Michigan. She was appointed as dean of the University of Michigan School of Information in 2007, as vice provost of the university in 2010, and as the 14th provost and executive vice president for academic affairs in 2013.

=== Cornell University ===
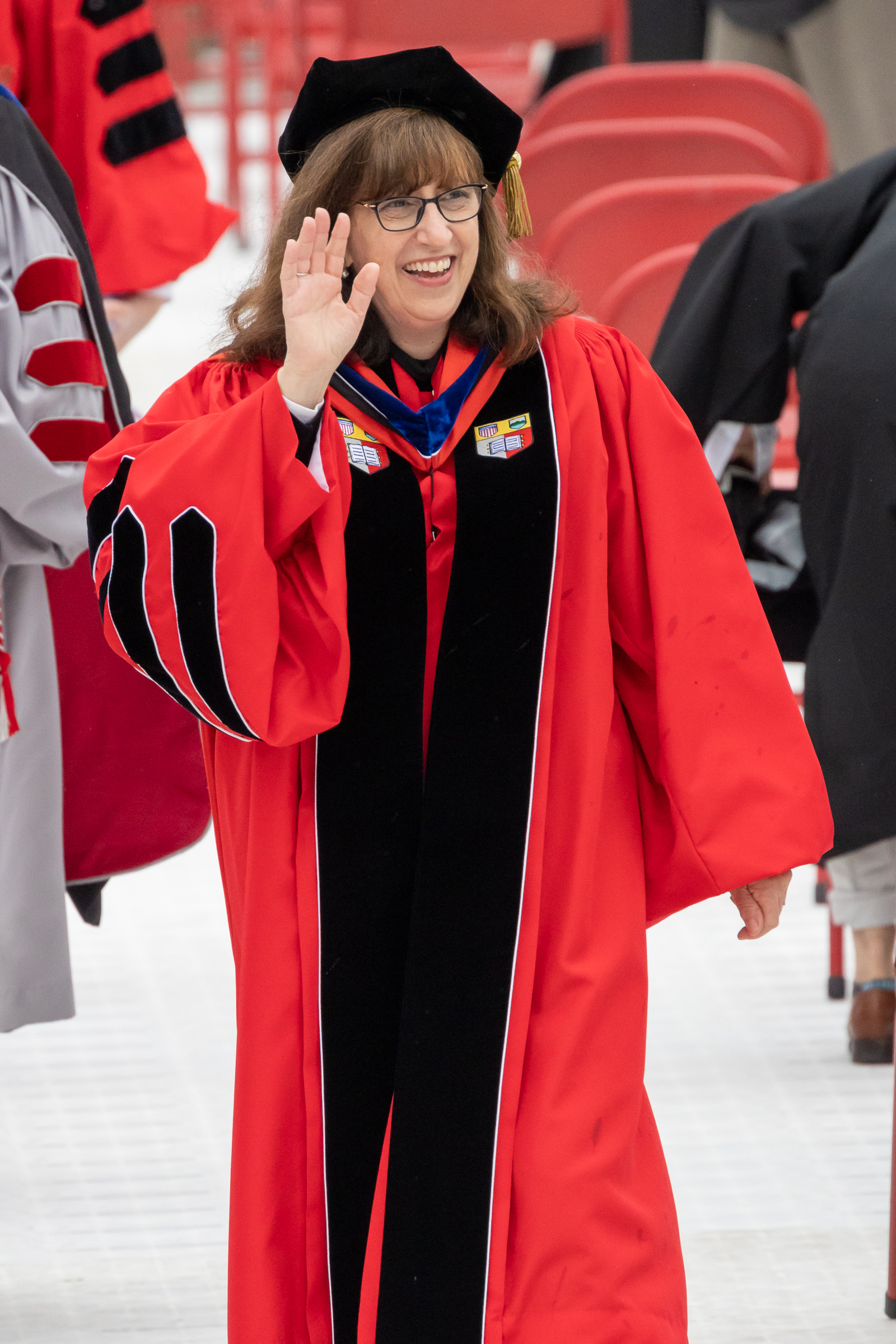
Pollack at Cornell University's 2021 commencement

On November 14, 2016, the Board of Trustees of Cornell University announced that they had unanimously elected Pollack as Cornell University’s 14th president. Her presidency began April 17, 2017, and she was inaugurated on August 25, 2017.

As the university president, Pollack made changes to Greek Life on campus, banning hard alcohol at fraternity and sorority events, suspending chapters suspected of hazing, and requiring a full-time live-in advisor for each fraternity and sorority house. Following widespread criticism of Cornell's culture and lack of support for students with mental health needs, she introduced plans to improve mental health services on campus.

Pollack rejected calls from the Boycott, Divestment and Sanctions movement for Cornell to boycott investments in Israel. In January 2024, she came under scrutiny by Jason Smith, chairman of the United States House Committee on Ways and Means for Cornell University's response to anti-semitism.

On May 9, 2024, Pollack announced her decision to retire as Cornell University president, effective June 30, 2024.

== Honors, boards, and committees ==
In 1991, Pollack was a IJCAI Computers and Thought Award recipient. Since 1996, she has been a fellow of the Association for the Advancement of Artificial Intelligence.

In 1997, she became program chair of the International Joint Conferences on Artificial Intelligence.

She was editor-in-chief of the Journal of Artificial Intelligence Research from 2001 to 2005. She served as the president of the Association for the Advancement of Artificial Intelligence from 2009 to 2010.

Since 2012, she was a fellow at the Association for Computing Machinery and American Association for the Advancement of Science.

In 2022, Pollack was elected to the American Academy of Arts and Sciences.

Academic offices
Preceded by Elizabeth Garrett	14th President of Cornell University; 2017 – present	Incumbent
