= Dale R. Corson =

American academic administrator (1914–2012)

President of Cornell University
- In office 1969–1977
- Preceded by: James A. Perkins
- Succeeded by: Frank H. T. Rhodes

Personal details
- Born: April 5, 1914 Pittsburg, Kansas, U.S.
- Died: March 31, 2012 (aged 97) Ithaca, New York, U.S.
- Education: College of Emporia (BA); University of Kansas (MA); University of California, Berkeley (PhD)

Dale Raymond Corson (April 5, 1914 – March 31, 2012) was an American physicist and academic administrator who was the eighth president of Cornell University.

== Early life ==
Born in Pittsburg, Kansas, in 1914, Corson received a B.A. degree from the College of Emporia in 1934, his M.A. degree from the University of Kansas in 1935, and his Ph.D. in physics from the University of California, Berkeley, in 1938.

== Career ==
=== Early career ===
After receiving his PhD, Corson spent the next two years as a post-doctoral fellow in the Radiation Laboratory at the University of California, Berkeley to help construct a 60-inch cyclotron. In 1939, Emilio Segrè suggested that the cyclotron could be used to bombard bismuth (element 83) with alpha particles to produce the then-unknown element 85. Corson, Kenneth Ross MacKenzie, and Segrè discovered and isolated the element in 1940. They named it "astatine" in 1947.

In 1946 Corson came to Cornell University as an assistant professor of physics and helped design the Cornell synchrotron. He was appointed associate professor of physics in 1947, became a full professor in 1956, was named chairman of the physics department in 1956, and became dean of the College of Engineering in 1959. Following the 1969 resignation of James A. Perkins, Corson became president of Cornell and served until 1977 after which he served for three years as chancellor. In 1979, he was elected by the Board of Trustees as president emeritus.

=== Achievements at Cornell University ===
Corson led the university through the final years of the Vietnam War and student activism, and through the economic recession of the 1970s. His role was to return the university to stability: to concentration on research, teaching, and scholarship.

Corson brought together the state and endowed components of Cornell, forming one university enjoying public and private support, as envisioned by White and Cornell and articulated by Jacob Gould Schurman. Significant support was provided for the research programs at Arecibo, the Wilson Synchrotron Laboratory, and the establishment in 1977 of the National Research and Resource Facility for Submicron Structures (NRRFSS). He revitalized the Department of Geology, expanded the Division of Biological Sciences, and added new programs, such as Medieval studies. The I.M. Pei-designed Herbert F. Johnson Museum of Art was completed. He encouraged such multidisciplinary programs as Science, Technology, and Society, the Materials Science Center, environmental programs, radio physics, and space research.

The status of women on campus was greatly improved during the Corson presidency. A Women's Studies Program was formally established in 1972. A Provost's Advisory Committee on the Status of Women was created and presented specific recommendations. The university's policy statement on equal opportunity was changed to include gender among the proscribed criteria with regard to admission to the university. New employment procedures were implemented, and increasing numbers of women were appointed to the faculty and to high administrative positions. Corson provided support for the Africana Studies and Research Center, which had developed from the black studies movement. He recommended the formation of an Affirmative Action Advisory Board to monitor the status of women and minorities and to propose more effective procedures.

During his presidency, university governance was overhauled including the establishment of a faculty-student-employee University Senate and the addition of Student and Employee representatives to the board of trustees. A new campus judicial system and campus code of conduct were established.

=== Special Committee on Space Technology ===
Corson also served on NACA"s Special Committee on Space Technology also called the Stever Committee, named after its chairman. It was a special steering committee that was formed with the mandate to coordinate various branches of the Federal government, private companies as well as universities within the United States with NACA's objectives and also harness their expertise in order to develop a space program. Dr. Corson therefore played a pivotal role in the process of establishing the nascent United States space program.

=== Scientific work ===
He was the author of a very important textbook on electromagnetism with the following two editions:

- Corson, D.R. and Lorrain, P. Introduction to electromagnetic fields and waves, W. H. Freeman, 1962.
- Lorrain, P. and Corson, Dale R. Electromagnetic Fields and Waves, 2nd ed., W. H. Freeman, 1970 (ISBN 0-7167-1823-5).

The latter incorporated some of the ideas of relativistic electromagnetism.

As part of his Ph.D. work in UC Berkeley, Corson was a co-discoverer of the element astatine. In 1987 he was awarded the Public Welfare Medal from the National Academy of Sciences.

== Footnotes and references ==
Academic offices
Preceded by James A. Perkins	President of Cornell University; 1969–1977	Succeeded by Frank H. T. Rhodes
Preceded by Sanford Soverhill Atwood	Provost of Cornell University; 1963 – 1969	Succeeded by Robert A. Plane
