= Elizabeth Garrett =

American academic (1963–2016)

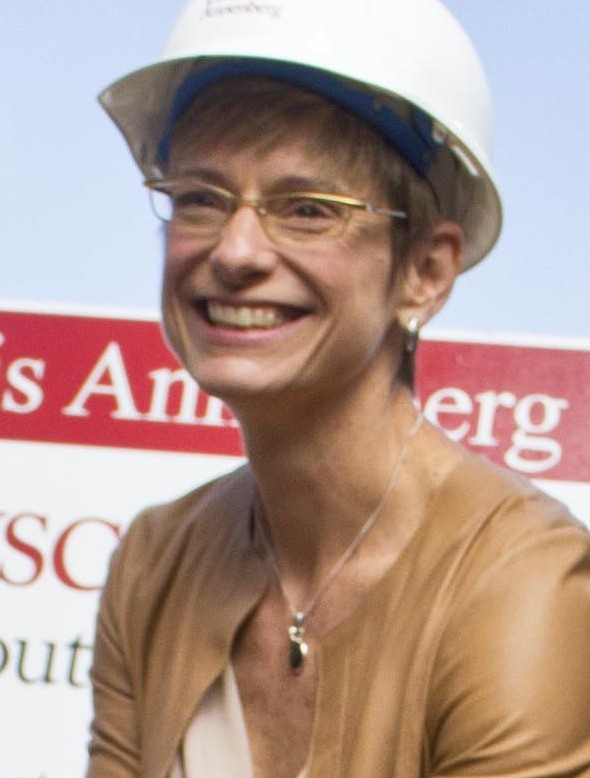

13th President of Cornell University
- In office July 1, 2015 – March 6, 2016
- Preceded by: David J. Skorton
- Succeeded by: Martha E. Pollack

Provost of the University of Southern California
- In office 2010–2015

Personal details
- Born: Helen Elizabeth Garrett; June 30, 1963 Oklahoma City, Oklahoma, U.S.
- Died: March 6, 2016 (aged 52) New York City, New York, U.S.
- Spouse: Andrei Marmor
- Education: University of Oklahoma (BA); University of Virginia (JD)

Academic work
- Discipline: Jurisprudence
- Institutions: University of Chicago; University of Southern California; Cornell University

Helen Elizabeth Garrett, commonly known as Elizabeth Garrett or Beth Garrett (June 30, 1963 – March 6, 2016), was an American professor of law and academic administrator. On July 1, 2015, she became the 13th president of Cornell University—the first woman to serve as president of the university. She died from colon cancer on March 6, 2016, the first Cornell president to die while in office.

== Early life and education ==
Garrett was born in Oklahoma City on June 30, 1963, to Robert and Jane Garrett. According to her mother, Garrett began to read very early and thereafter was never seen without a book in her hand. At age 3, according to Jane, young Garrett announced she would be a lawyer—Garrett, more modestly, claimed she was 5. Her father, Robert, had earned a law degree, though he worked as president of a savings and loan. An uncle and grandfather were also lawyers.

Jane's great-grandfather was the first to open a school in the Choctaw Reservation town of Lehigh, Oklahoma. Her parents taught her and her sister Laura that when they finished a task, they should start on something else.

Garrett earned her Bachelor of Arts in history with special distinction from the University of Oklahoma in 1985. In a 2004 interview, David Levy, Garrett's favorite history professor at the University of Oklahoma, said that Garrett would finish the weekly quiz ahead of the other students and, in the same motion, turn over the paper and reach for next week's reading. Levy also said of Garrett that he "never had a student who made better use of time." As a sophomore at the University of Oklahoma, Garrett became chair of student congress, the University of Oklahoma Student Government Association, a position she held until she graduated.

In 1988, she received her Juris Doctor degree from the University of Virginia School of Law.

After law school, Garrett clerked for U.S. Supreme Court Justice Thurgood Marshall and for Judge Stephen F. Williams on the U.S. Court of Appeals for the District of Columbia Circuit. She also served as a legal advisor at the Iran–United States Claims Tribunal at The Hague and as legislative director and tax and budget counsel for Senator David L. Boren of Oklahoma. Boren said about Garrett, "If I were to count on the fingers of one hand the people I’ve known with the most remarkable intellect, she would be on that list."

== Academia ==
Garrett's primary scholarly interests included legislative process, the initiative and referendum process and the federal budget process. Among her prolific writings, she was co-author of the preeminent case book on legislation and statutory interpretation, Cases and Materials on Legislation and Regulation: Statutes and the Creation of Public Policy (2014). She was also co-editor of Fiscal Challenges: An Interdisciplinary Approach to Budget Policy and Statutory Interpretation Stories. Her interdisciplinary scholarship used insights from economics and political science to understand how to design democratic institutions to ensure outcomes more consistent with citizen preferences—and how those preferences might be shaped by the political and legal environments.

Garrett was a professor of law at the University of Chicago from 1995 to 1999 and also served as deputy dean for academic affairs. She also taught as a visiting professor at Harvard Law School, the California Institute of Technology, the University of Virginia Law School, Central European University in Budapest, and the Interdisciplinary Center Law School in Israel.

=== Career at the University of Southern California ===
Garrett began her tenure at the University of Southern California in 2003 as the Frances R. and John J. Duggan Professor of Law and Vice Provost.

In 2005, U.S. President George W. Bush appointed Garrett to serve on the nine-member bipartisan President's Advisory Panel for Federal Tax Reform. Its report was issued later in that same year.

On March 30, 2009, U.S. President Barack Obama nominated Garrett to be Assistant Secretary of the Treasury for Tax Policy in the Department of Treasury. Garrett withdrew her nomination on May 29, 2009, citing "aspects of my personal family situation."

From 2009 to 2014, she served on the California Fair Political Practices Commission. She also served as director of the USC-Caltech Center for the Study of Law and Politics. Garrett also served on the boards of the Initiative & Referendum Institute at USC and on the Internet2 Board of Directors.

Between 2010 and 2015, Garrett served as Provost and Senior Vice President for Academic Affairs, USC's second-ranking officer under USC President C. L. Max Nikias. As provost, she proved a superb administrator with a complex portfolio. In addition to serving as a professor in the USC Gould School of Law, Garrett oversaw the Dornsife College of Letters, Arts and Sciences, as well as the Keck School of Medicine of USC. She also hired Provost Professors and founded the Provost's Postdoctoral Scholars Program in the Humanities. Over the course of two years, Garrett formed The USC Strategic Vision: Matching Deeds to Ambitions, which the Board of Trustees accepted in December 2011.

=== President of Cornell University ===
On September 30, 2014, Cornell University's Board of Trustees unanimously elected Garrett as the 13th president of Cornell University. The university's search for a president began when incumbent president David J. Skorton announced in March 2014 that he would be leaving Cornell on June 30, 2015, to become the next secretary of the Smithsonian Institution. She was selected after a six-month search in which some two hundred candidates were considered. Garrett was the first woman selected to lead Cornell University.

==== Inauguration Ceremony ====
Garrett's inauguration ceremony was held on September 18, 2015, on the Arts Quadrangle of Cornell University. She delivered her inaugural address in front of the iconic statue of Ezra Cornell. She spoke of "the spirit of Cornell that frames our journey" and stressed the importance of the faculty as the foundation of the university; students as partners in the voyage of discovery; and the university's growing presence in New York City as a source of opportunity. Garrett said that the recruitment, development and retention of the best faculty remained Cornell University's paramount priorities. She also spoke of focusing on the residential undergraduate experience, defining as a community the shared intellectual experience all Cornell students should encounter. And she pointed to the opportunities inherent in the university's dual footprint, in Ithaca and New York City, urging all of Cornell's colleges to connect with Cornell Tech in new collaborations.

Following the ceremony, the university hosted a picnic on the Agriculture Quadrangle, inviting Ithaca citizens as well as the campus community. The Cornell Dairy prepared 450 gallons of its newest ice cream flavor, 24 Garrett Swirl. Later in the day, Garrett moderated a panel on democracy and inequality in Bailey Hall, bringing together eminent faculty to explore how inequality interacts with immigration, access to education and health care, job creation and economic opportunity.

==== Tenure at Cornell University ====
Although she served as Cornell's president for 7 months, Garrett was popular with students and actively involved in campus issues, working to ameliorate housing problems for graduate students, approving the opening of Anabel's Grocery store, rearranging administrative leadership and defending freedom of speech on campus.

Several of Garrett's decisions also sparked controversy, including her reversal of President Emeritus David Skorton’s 2035 carbon neutrality goal and the January 2016 decision to form the College of Business. Many members of the Cornell community, including students, faculty and alumni, criticized Garrett’s decisions and the lack of transparency in the administration's decision-making.

Garrett also emphasized the importance of supporting every Cornell constituency and often expressed her support for students and faculty. At her State of the University address on October 23, 2015, Garrett said that Cornell University "students are simply amazing." She also said that it is important to provide ample support for students so that they can both contribute to and gain from their academic experience.

== Death ==
Garrett died on March 6, 2016, from colon cancer at her New York City home at the age of 52. She was the first Cornell president to die while in office. Garrett first shared her cancer diagnosis with the Cornell University community February 8, 2016, in a statement. She underwent surgery February 19, 2016, and officially delegated the duties and powers of the presidency to Provost Michael Kotlikoff, as provided by the Cornell University Bylaws. On February 22, 2016, acting president Kotlikoff announced that she had been released from the intensive care unit and would continue treatment under the care of doctors at Weill Cornell Medicine.

The Cornell community gathered across campus in the late afternoon of March 7, 2016, to pay their respects to Garrett. More than a thousand university leaders, students, faculty, staff and local community members met on the Cornell Arts Quadrangle, the same ground that fewer than six months earlier saw the celebration of Garrett's inauguration.

On the evening of March 8, 2016, hundreds of students gathered in front of Willard Straight Hall to honor Garrett with a candlelight vigil. Several speakers shared their memories of Garrett and how she had influenced them. Before and after the vigil, students signed a card for Garrett's family.

Before her untimely death, Garrett expressed her desire to create a fund at Weill Cornell Medicine to advance research in colon cancer. On March 8, 2016, Dr. Laurie Glimcher, the Stephen and Suzanne Weiss Dean of Weill Cornell Medicine, announced the launch of the President Elizabeth Garrett Fund for Colon Cancer Research.

A memorial gathering was held in Bailey Hall on March 17, 2016.

Garrett was survived by her husband, Israeli legal philosopher Andrei Marmor, the Jacob Gould Schurman Professor of Philosophy and Law at Cornell University; her parents, Robert and Jane Garrett; and a sister, Laura Garrett.

== Personal life ==
During her tenure at the University of Chicago Law School, Garrett started dating Andrei Marmor, and they got married soon after. Matthew Spitzer, dean of USC Gould School of Law at the time, coincidentally attempted to recruit both Garrett and Marmor independently to come to USC before they met. Soon after they decided to get married, Garrett and Marmor accepted USC's offers. She and her husband enjoyed traveling together, and most recently visited Cambodia, Vietnam, and Italy before her death in 2016.

One of Garrett's hobbies was cross-stitching. In her USC office, Garrett covered her walls in cross-stitched state mottos and landscapes of Jerusalem, Chicago, and the Netherlands. She would send cross-stitched works to her family and friends. Her college friend, Mike Bresson said he remembered traveling through Italy with Garrett and a group of others, and while everyone else slept, she cross-stitched, never to waste a moment.

== Honors ==
- University of Chicago Law School Graduating Students’ Award for Teaching Excellence (1997)
- Crain's Chicago Business “40 Under 40” Award for Most Influential Young Chicagoans (2000)
- Outstanding Teaching Award from the Latter-Day Saint Student Association (2006)
- Distinguished Alumna of the College of Arts and Sciences (Social Sciences), University of Oklahoma (2007)
- Association of Trojan Leagues Outstanding Service Award (2008)
- Phi Kappa Phi Honor Society
- Life Fellow, American Bar Foundation
- Harold Lasswell Fellow of the American Academy of Political and Social Science (inducted 2013) Member, American Law Institute
- Honorary Doctor of Humane Letters, University of Oklahoma (2015)
- University of Virginia’s 2016 Distinguished Alumna Award

== Bibliography ==
=== Publications ===
- The Modified Payoff of Failed Banks: A Settlement Practice to Inject Market Discipline into the Commercial Banking System, 73 Va. L. Rev. 1349 (1987) (student note).
- Market Discipline by Depositors: A Summary of the Theoretical and Empirical Arguments, 5 Yale J. Reg. 215 (1988) (with Jonathan Macey).
- Term Limitations and the Myth of the Citizen-Legislator, 81 Cornell L. Rev. 623 (1996).
- Enhancing the Political Safeguards of Federalism?: The Unfunded Mandates Reform Act of 1995, 45 U. Kan. L. Rev. 1113 (1997).
- Who Directs Direct Democracy?, 4 U. Chi. L. Sch. Roundtable 17 (1997), reprinted in 1 Pakistan L. Rev. (2001).
- Harnessing Politics: The Dynamics of Offset Requirements in the Tax Legislative Process, 65 U. Chi. L. Rev. 501 (1998).
- A Fiscal Constitution with Supermajority Voting Rules, 40 Wm. & Mary L. Rev. 471 (1999). Rethinking the Structures of Decisionmaking in the Federal Budget Process, 35 Harv. J. Legis. 387 (1998).
- Accountability and Restraint: The Federal Budget Process and the Line Item Veto Act, 20 Cardozo L. Rev. 871 (1999).
- Money, Agenda Setting, and Direct Democracy, 77 Tex. L. Rev. 1845 (1999).
- The Law and Economics of “Informed Voter” Ballot Notations, 85 Va. L. Rev. 1533 (1999).
- Legal Scholarship in the Age of Legislation, 34 Tulsa L.J. 679 (1999).
- Interest Groups and Public Interested Legislation, 28 Fla. St. U. L. Rev. 137 (2000).
- The Congressional Budget Process: Strengthening the Party-in-Government, 100 Colum. L. Rev. 702 (2000).
- Issues in Implementing Referendums in Israel: A Comparative Study in Direct Democracy, 2 Chi. J. of Internat’l Law 159 (2001).
- Institutional Design of a Thayerian Congress, 50 Duke L.J. 1277 (2001), in Congress and the Constitution 242 (N. Devins & K. Whittington eds., 2005)
- The Battle Over Citizen Lawmaking 73 (M.D. Waters ed., 2001) (with Elisabeth R. Gerber).
- Money in the Initiative and Referendum Process: Evidence of its Effects and Prospects for Reform, in
- Political Intermediaries and the Internet “Revolution,” 34 Loyola L.A. L. Rev. 1055 (2001).
- Leaving the Decision to Congress, in The Vote: Bush, Gore, and the Supreme Court 38 (Sunstein & Epstein eds., 2001).
- Institutional Lessons from the 2000 Presidential Election, 29 Fla. St. U. L. Rev. 975 (2001).
- Statutory Interpretation (2002): Article 1, available at https://web.archive.org/web/20080821213212/http://www.bepress.com/ils/iss3/art1.
- Attention to Context in Statutory Interpretation: Applying the Lessons of Dynamic Statutory Interpretation to Omnibus Legislation, Issues in Leg. Scholarship, Dynamic
- Constitution and Campaign Finance Reform 579 (2d ed., F.G. Slabach ed., 2006).
- The William J. Brennan Lecture in Constitutional Law: The Future of Campaign Finance Laws in the Courts and in Congress, 27 O.C.U. L. Rev. 665 (2002).
- The Impact of Bush v. Gore on Future Democratic Politics, in The Future of American Democratic Politics: Principles and Practices 141 (G.M. Pomper & M.D. Weiner eds., 2003).
- Voting with Cues, 37 Rich. L. Rev. 1011 (2003).
- Is the Party Over? Courts and the Political Process, 2002 Sup. Ct. Rev. 95 (2003).
- Legislating Chevron, 101 Mich. L. Rev. 2637 (2003).
- McConnell v. FEC and Disclosure, 3 Elect. L.J. 237 (2004).
- Democracy in the Wake of the California Recall, 153 U. Pa. L. Rev. 239 (2004) (chosen as “Recommended Reading” in the Green Bag's Reader of Good Legal Writing from 2006).
- The Purposes of Framework Legislation, 14 J. Contemp. Legal Issues 717 (2005).
- Paying for Politics, 78 S. Cal. L. Rev. 591 (2005) (with John de Figueiredo).
- Step One of Chevron v. National Resources Defense Council, in A Guide to Judicial and Political Review of Federal Agencies 55-84 (J.F. Duffy & M. Herz eds., 2005).
- Veiled Political Actors and Campaign Disclosure Laws in Direct Democracy, 4 Elect. L.J. 295 (2005) (with Daniel A. Smith).
- Hybrid Democracy, 73 G.W.U. L. Rev. 1096 (2005).
- The Story of Clinton v. City of New York: Congress Can Take Care of Itself, in Administrative Law Stories 47 (P. Strauss ed., 2005).
- Conditions for Framework Legislation, in The Least Examined Branch: The Role of Legislatures in the Constitutional State 294 (R. Bauman & T. Kahana eds., 2006).
- The Fifth Annual Henry Lecture: The Promise and Perils of Hybrid Democracy, 59 Okla. L. Rev. 227 (2006) (chosen as “Recommended Reading” in the Green Bag's Reader of Good Legal Writing from 2007).
- The Dual Path Initiative Framework, 80 S. Cal. L. Rev. 299 (2007) (with Mathew D. McCubbins).
- Transparency in the Budget Process, in Fiscal Challenges: An Interdisciplinary Approach to Budget Policy (E. Garrett, E. Graddy & H. Jackson eds., 2008) (with Adrian Vermeule).
- When Voters Make Laws: How Direct Democracy is Shaping American Cities, 13 Public Works Mgmt & Pol’y 39 (2008) (with Mathew D. McCubbins).
- Framework Legislation and Federalism, 83 Notre Dame L. Rev. 1495 (2008).
- Legislation and Statutory Interpretation, in The Oxford Handbook of Law and Politics 360 (K.E. Whittington, R.D. Kelemen & G.A. Caldiera eds., 2008).
- Constitutional Issues Raised by the Lobbying Disclosure Act, in The Lobbying Manual: A Complete Guide to Federal Law Governing Lawyers and Lobbyists 197 (4th ed. 2009) and (3d ed. 2005) (W.V. Luneburg, T.M. Susman & R.H. Gordon eds., American Bar Association) (with Ronald M. Levin & Theodore Ruger).
- New Voices in Politics: Justice Marshall's Jurisprudence on Law and Politics, 52 Howard L.J. 655 (2009).
- Direct Democracy, in Research Handbook on Public Choice and Public Law 137 (D.A. Farber & A.J. O’Connell eds., 2010).
- The Story of TVA v. Hill: Congress Has the Last Word, in Statutory Interpretation Stories (W.N. Eskridge Jr., P.P. Frickey & E. Garrett eds., 2011).
- The Dilemma of Direct Democracy, 9 Election L.J. 305 (2010) (with Craig Burnett and Mathew D. McCubbins).
- Legislation and Statutory Interpretation (2000) and (rev. ed. 2006) (Foundation's Concepts and Insights Series) (with William N. Eskridge Jr. and Philip P. Frickey).
- Cases and Materials on Legislation: Statutes and the Creation of Public Policy (4th ed. 2007) and Supplement (2010), (3d ed. 2001) and Supplement (2004) (with William N. Eskridge Jr. and Philip P. Frickey).
- Fiscal Challenges: An Interdisciplinary Approach to Budget Policy (Elizabeth Garrett, Elizabeth Graddy & Howell Jackson eds., Cambridge University Press) (hardback 2008, paperback with revised introduction 2009).
- Statutory Interpretation Stories (2011) (William N. Eskridge Jr., Philip P. Frickey and Elizabeth Garrett eds. Foundation Press).

=== Essays, Editorials, and Book Reviews ===
- Remarks on Anti-Abuse Rules, 74 Taxes 197 (1996).
- Book Review of John M. Carey, Term Limits and Legislative Representation, 93 Public Choice 517 (1997).
- Book Review of Mark Tushnet, Making Civil Rights Law and Making Constitutional Law, 1997 J. Sup. Ct. Hist. 140.
- Becoming Lawyers: The Role of the Socratic Method in Modern Law Schools, 1 Green Bag 2d 199 (1998) (reviewing Lani Guinier, Becoming Gentlemen: Women, Law School, and Institutional Change).
- Book Review of Bernard Grofman (ed.), Legislative Term Limits: Public Choice Perspectives, 96 Public Choice 210 (1998).
- Entry on Term Limits in the Encyclopedia of the American Constitution (Levy, Karst, & Winkler eds.) (2d ed. 2000).
- Law and Economics: Introductory Remarks to the Tenth Circuit Court of Appeals Conference, 31 N.M. L. Rev. 107 (2001) (transcript of remarks and panel discussion).
- Thus Always Two Tyrants?, 2 Elect. L.J. 285 (2003) (reviewing Lisa Jane Disch, The Tyranny of the Two Party System).
- Budget Magic Tricks, The World and I, July 2003, at 54.
- Book Review of David Schultz, Money, Politics, and Campaign Finance Reform in the States, newsletter of the Section on Representation and Electoral Systems, American Political Science Association, Oct. 2003, at 10-11.
- Teaching Law and Politics, 7 N.Y.U. J. Leg. & Pub. Pol'y 11 (2003).
- Accounting for the Federal Budget and Its Reform, 41 Harv. J. on Legis. 187 (2004) (commenting on Howell Jackson, Accounting for Social Security and Its Reform).
- Book Review of George I. Lovell, Legislative Deferrals, 109 Am. Hist. Rev. 934 (2004).
- Who Chooses the Rules?, 4 Elect. L.J. 139 (2005) (comment on Dennis Thompson, Just Elections).
- Redistricting: Another California Revolution?, Initiative and Referendum Institute Report 2005-1, available at https://web.archive.org/web/20160128032559/http://iandrinstitute.org/Apportion.htm.
- Crypto-Initiatives in Hybrid Democracy, 78 S. Cal. L. Rev. 985 (2005).
- Faith in Reason: Voter Competence and Local Bond Propositions, USC Keston Institute for Public Finance and Infrastructure Policy Research Paper 07-01 (Jan. 2007 (with Mathew D. McCubbins), available at https://web.archive.org/web/20070308213556/http://www.usc.edu/schools/sppd/lusk/keston/research/index.html.
- The Political Process, 34 Pepperdine L. Rev. 554 (2007) (symposium on The Roberts Court's Rookie Year).
- Entry on Legislative Immunity, in 3 Encyclopedia of the Supreme Court of the United States (David S. Tanenhaus ed., 2008).
- How the Financial Crisis is Reshaping Democratic Politics: Term Limits Reconsidered, Los Angeles Daily Journal, October 3, 2208, at 4; and Balkinization blog, September 30, 2008, available at http://balkin.blogspot.com/2008/09/how-financial-crisis-is-reshaping.html (with Richard Pildes).
- Preferences, Laws, and Default Rules, 122 Harv. L. Rev. 2104 (2009) (review of Einer Elhauge, Statutory Default Rules).

== See also ==
- List of law clerks for the tenth seat of the Supreme Court of the United States

Academic offices
Preceded by David J. Skorton	13th President of Cornell University; 2015 – 2016	Succeeded by Martha E. Pollack
