= List of Cornell University faculty =

Past and present Cornell University faculty

This list of Cornell University faculty includes notable current and former instructors and administrators of Cornell University, an Ivy League university located in Ithaca, New York.

== Nobel laureates ==
=== Chemistry ===
- Peter Debye (professor of Chemistry, 1940–50; department chair) — Chemistry 1936; National Medal of Science (1965)
- Manfred Eigen (A. D. White Professor-at-Large, 1965–76) — Chemistry 1967
- Richard R. Ernst (A. D. White Professor-at-Large, 1996–2002) — Chemistry 1991
- Paul Flory (Chemistry faculty, 1948–57) — Chemistry 1974; National Medal of Science (1974)
- Otto Hahn (George Fisher Baker Lecturer of Chemistry, 1933) — Chemistry 1944
- Gerhard Herzberg (George Fischer Baker Non-Resident Lecturer in Chemistry 1968) — Chemistry 1971
- Roald Hoffmann (Frank H. T. Rhodes Professor in Humane Letters) — Chemistry 1981; National Medal of Science (1983)
- Linus Pauling (George Fischer Baker Non-Resident Lecturer in Chemistry 1937–1938; Messenger Lecturer 1959) — Chemistry 1954; the bulk of his most influential scientific book The Nature of the Chemical Bond was completed while he was at Cornell and was published by Cornell University Press in 1939
- James B. Sumner (professor, 1929–55 and professor emeritus of Biochemistry/Nutrition) — Chemistry 1946
- Henry Taube (instructor and assistant professor, 1941–1946) — Chemistry 1983; National Medal of Science (1976)
- Vincent du Vigneaud (professor of Biochemistry, Medical College, 1938–67, professor of Chemistry, 1967–75) — Chemistry 1955; Albert Lasker Award for Basic Medical Research (1948)

=== Peace, Literature, or Economics ===
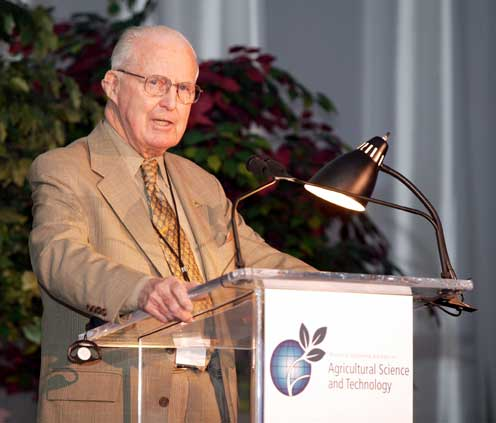
Norman Borlaug, "father of the Green Revolution"

- Norman Borlaug (A. D. White Professor-at-Large, 1982–88) — Peace 1970; National Medal of Science (2004)
- Linus Pauling (George Fischer Baker Non-Resident Lecturer in Chemistry 1937–1938; Messenger Lecturer 1959) — Peace 1962
- Octavio Paz (A. D. White Professor-at-Large, 1972–74) — Literature 1990
- Amartya Sen (A. D. White Professor-at-Large, 1978–84) — Economics 1998; National Humanities Medal (2012)
- Wole Soyinka (Senior Fellow, Society for the Humanities, 1985; Goldwin Smith professor for African Studies and Theatre Arts, 1988–1991) — Literature 1986
- Richard Thaler (professor 1978–1995) — Economics 2017; member of the National Academy of Sciences (2018)

=== Physics ===
Hans Bethe

- Hannes Alfvén (Distinguished Professor in Engineering) — Physics 1970
- Hans Bethe (John Wendell Anderson Professor of Physics, 1935–2005) — Physics 1967; National Medal of Science (1975)
- Richard Feynman (Physics faculty, 1945–1950) — Nobel Prize in Physics 1965; National Medal of Science (1979)
- Pierre-Gilles de Gennes (A. D. White Professor-at-Large, 1977–1983) and Bethe Lecturer in Physics, 1989–90) — Physics 1991
- Brian D. Josephson (NSF Senior Foreign Scientist Fellow, 1971–1972) — Physics 1973
- David Lee (professor of Physics) — Physics 1996
- Anthony James Leggett (visiting professor, April 1973, July 1974, Bethe Lecturer, April 1980, visiting scientist, January — August 1983) — Physics 2003; Wolf Prize in Physics (2002)
- Roger Penrose (visiting professor) — Physics 2020
- Robert Coleman Richardson (Floyd R. Newman Professor of Physics) — Physics 1996
- John Robert Schrieffer (A. D. White Professor-at-Large, 1969–1975) — Physics 1972; National Medal of Science (1983)
- George Paget Thomson (non-resident lecturer, 1929–1930) — Physics 1937
- Kip Thorne (Andrew D. White Professor-at-Large, 1986–1992; visiting senior research associate, January — June 1977; Hans Bethe Lecturer, 1986; Yervant Terzian Memorial Lecture, 2016) — Physics 2017
- Kenneth G. Wilson (professor of Physics and Nuclear Studies, 1963–1988) — Physics 1982; Wolf Prize in Physics (1980)

=== Physiology or Medicine ===
- James P. Allison (professor, Weill Cornell Medicine 2004–2012) — Physiology or Medicine 2018, Wolf Prize in Medicine (2017)
- Robert F. Furchgott (Assistant Professor of biochemistry, Research Associate, Medical College, 1940–49) — Physiology or Medicine 1998
- Herbert Spencer Gasser (Medical College, 1931–34) — Physiology or Medicine 1944
- Paul Greengard (A. D. White Professor-at-Large, 1981–87) — Physiology or Medicine 2000
- Haldan Keffer Hartline (associate professor, Medical College, 1940–41) — Physiology or Medicine 1967
- Robert W. Holley (Ph.D. 1947 Organic Chemistry; professor and department chair in Biochemistry, 1948–64) — Physiology or Medicine 1968
- Har Gobind Khorana (A. D. White Professor-at-Large, 1974–80) — Physiology or Medicine 1968; National Medal of Science (1987)
- Fritz Albert Lipmann (research associate, Medical College, 1939–1941) — Physiology or Medicine 1953; National Medal of Science (1966)
- Peter Medawar (A. D. White Professor-at-Large, 1965–71) — Physiology or Medicine 1960
- Harold E. Varmus (Lewis Thomas University Professor of Medicine, 2015–) — Physiology or Medicine 1989; National Medal of Science (2001)

== MacArthur awards ==
- Archie Randolph Ammons (professor of Creative Writing, 1964–98) — poetry 1981
- William Dichtel (associate professor of Chemistry and Chemical Biology, 2008–2016) — Chemistry 2015
- Craig Fennie (assistant professor of Applied and Engineering Physics) — materials science 2013
- Mitchell J. Feigenbaum (postdoc 1970–1972, professor, 1982–1988) — physics 1984; Wolf Prize in Physics (1986), member of the National Academy of Sciences and fellow of the American Academy of Arts and Sciences
- Alice Fulton (professor of Creative Writing) — poetry 1991
- Deborah Estrin (associate dean and Robert V. Tishman ’37 Professor of Cornell Tech, 2013–) — computer science 2018; member of the National Academy of Engineering (2009)
- Henry Louis Gates Jr. (professor, 1985–90) — literary critic (1981); National Humanities Medal recipient (1998)
- Paul Ginsparg (professor of Physics and Computing & Information Science) — physics 2002
- Jon Kleinberg (Tisch University Professor of Computer Science) — computer science 2005
- Stephen Lee (professor of Solid State Chemistry) — chemistry 1993
- Michal Lipson (faculty of Electrical and Computer Engineering 2001–2015) — optical physics 2010; member of the National Academy of Sciences (2019)
- Robert Parris Moses (Frank H. T. Rhodes Class of '56 Professor, 2006–) — educator and philosopher (1982)
- Rebecca J. Nelson (associate professor of Plant Pathology, Plant Breeding and International Agriculture) — plant pathologist (1998)
- Sheila Nirenberg (professor at Weill Medical College) — neuroscience 2013
- Margaret W. Rossiter (Marie Underhill Noll Professor of the History of Science) — historian of science 1989
- Gregory Vlastos (faculty 1948–1955) — classicist and philosopher 1990

== Sports ==
- Bob Blackman (head coach, football, 1977–82) — member of the College Football Hall of Fame
- Charles E. Courtney (head coach, rowing, 1883–1920) — rower and rowing coach
- Melody Davidson (head coach, women's ice hockey) — head coach of the Canadian national women's hockey team and the Canadian 2006 Winter Olympics women's hockey team
- Hilary Gehman (head coach, women's rowing) — two-time Olympian; six-time member of the U.S. national rowing team
- Edward Moylan (head coach, tennis and squash, 1962–72) — tennis player; gold medal winner at the 1955 Pan American Games with Art Larsen
- Nicole Ross (assistant coach, fencing, 2016–18) — Olympic foil fencer; won the 2010 NCAA individual women's foil title
- Michel Sebastiani (coach, fencing, 1963–70) — Olympic fencing coach and member of the US Fencing Association Hall of Fame; his women’s team won the Intercollegiate Women's Fencing Association (NIWFA) National Championship in 1967, 1968, and 1969, and his fencers also won the NIWFA individual title in 1968, and another won the NCAA men’s épée title in 1968
- Michael Slive (director of Athletics, 1981–83) — commissioner of the Southeastern Conference, 2002–15
- Phil Sykes (interim head coach, field hockey, 2003) — U.S. Olympic field hockey defender
- Al Walker (head coach, basketball, 1993–96) — former basketball player and college coach, now a scout for the Detroit Pistons of the NBA

== Education ==
- Arthur S. Adams (university provost 1946–1948) — president of the University of New Hampshire (1948–1950); president of the American Council on Education (1950–1961)
- Charles Kendall Adams (university president, 1885–1892) — president of the University of Wisconsin, 1892–1901
- John L. Anderson (Assistant Professor of Chemical Engineering, 1971–1976) — president of the Illinois Institute of Technology (2007–2015), provost and university vice president of Case Western Reserve University (2004–2007), dean of the College of Engineering at Carnegie Mellon University (1996–2004); member of the National Academy of Engineering and Fellow of the American Academy of Arts and Sciences and of the American Association for the Advancement of Science
- Elisha Andrews (faculty 1888-89) — president of Denison University (1875–79) and Brown University (1889–1898); chancellor of the University of Nebraska (1900–1909)
- Sanford Soverhill Atwood (university provost 1955–1963) — president of Emory University (1963–1977)
- Sarah Gibson Blanding (dean of Human Ecology, 1941–46) — president of Vassar College, 1946–1964
- Detlev Bronk (professor of Physiology at Cornell University Medical College 1939–1941) — president of Johns Hopkins University and the Rockefeller Institute; member of the National Academy of Sciences (1939)
- Robert F. Chandler (professor of Forest Soils) — president of the University of New Hampshire (1950–1954); winner of the World Food Prize, 1988
- James Mason Crafts (chemistry professor, 1867–1870) — president of MIT, 1897–1900
- Cornelis W. de Kiewiet (university provost 1948–1951; acting president 1949–1951) — president of the University of Rochester (1951–1961)
- Lloyd Hartman Elliott (professor of Educational Administration) — president of the University of Maine (1958–1965) and George Washington University (1965–1988)
- Thomas E. Everhart (professor of Electrical Engineering, dean of Engineering 1979–1984) — chancellor of the University of Illinois at Urbana-Champaign (1984–1987), president of the California Institute of Technology (1987–1997); member of the National Academy of Engineering and foreign fellow of the Royal Academy of Engineering
- W. Kent Fuchs (university provost, 2009–2014) — president of the University of Florida, 2015-
- Richard H. Gallagher (faculty 1967–1978) — president of Clarkson University (1988–1995) and member of National Academy of Engineering
- Charles De Garmo (faculty) — president of Swarthmore College (1891–1898)
- Theodore L. Hullar (faculty, 1979–1984, 1997–) — chancellor of UC Riverside (1985–1987) and UC Davis (1987–1994)
- Harry Burns Hutchins (Law faculty 1887–1894) — president of the University of Michigan, 1909–1920
- William Rea Keast (professor, department chair, dean of Arts & Sciences, vice president for Academic Affairs, 1951–1965) — president of Wayne State University, 1965–1971
- David C. Knapp (university provost, 1974–1978) — president of the University of Massachusetts (1978–1990)
- Asa S. Knowles (vice president of University Development, 1948–1951) — president of the University of Toledo (1951–1958) and of Northeastern University (1959–1975)
- Edward H. Litchfield (dean of School of Business) — twelfth chancellor of the University of Pittsburgh (1956–1965)
- Carolyn Martin (university provost, 2000–2008) — chancellor of the University of Wisconsin, 2008–2011; president of Amherst College, 2011–
- Alan G. Merten (dean of the Johnson School) — president of George Mason University (1996–2012)
- John Niland (assistant professor 1970–1972) — vice-chancellor and principal of the University of New South Wales, Australia (1992–2002)
- Paul Olum (faculty, 1949–1974; Mathematics Department chair, 1963–1966) — president of the University of Oregon, 1980–1989
- Russell K. Osgood (dean and professor of Law, 1988–1998) — president of Grinnell College 1998–2010
- Robert A. Plane (chemistry professor; university provost 1969–1973) — president of Clarkson University (1974–1985) and of Wells College (1991–1995)
- Don Michael Randel (university provost, dean of Arts & Sciences) — president of the University of Chicago, 2000–2006
- Charles Ashmead Schaeffer (dean of faculty) — president of the University of Iowa, 1887–1898
- Benjamin Ide Wheeler (professor of Greek and Comparative Philology) — president of the University of California, 1899–1919
- Roy A. Young (president of Boyce Thompson Institute for Plant Research of Cornell University, 1980–1986) — chancellor of the University of Nebraska–Lincoln, 1976–1980

== Engineering and computer science ==
=== Computer science ===
- Robert L. Constable (professor emeritus, Computer Science) — Work connecting programs and mathematical proofs, especially the Nuprl system
- Richard W. Conway (Emerson Electric Company Professor of Manufacturing Management) — industrial engineering, simulation, scheduling theory, PL/C and other programming languages and dialects for instructional use, first director of the Office of Computing Services
- R. Keith Dennis (professor emeritus, Mathematics) — Known for his work in algebraic K-theory
- Carla Gomes (professor of Computer Science) — Director of the Institute for Computational Sustainability
- Paul Ginsparg (professor of Physics and Computing & Information Science, 2001–) — developer of the arXiv e-print archive, MacArthur Award
- David Gries (professor emeritus, Computer Science) — author of The Science of Programming (1981), 4 national education awards
- Joseph Halpern (professor of Computer Science) — computer scientist; recipient of the Gödel Prize (1997), member of the National Academy of Engineering (2019)
- Juris Hartmanis (professor emeritus, Computer Science) — Turing Award recipient, 1993; member of the National Academy of Engineering (1989)
- John Hopcroft (IBM Professor of Engineering and Applied Mathematics in Computer Science, Emeritus) — Turing Award recipient (1986), IEEE John von Neumann Medal recipient (2010), member of the National Academy of Engineering (1989) and of the National Academy of Sciences (2009)
- Jon Kleinberg (Tisch University Professor of Computer Science) — MacArthur Award and Nevanlinna Prize, member of the American Academy of Arts and Sciences (2007), the National Academy of Engineering (2008) and the National Academy of Sciences (2011)
- Dexter Kozen (professor of Computer Science) — computer scientist specializing in dynamic logic
- Trevor Pinch (chair of Science and Technology Studies Department) — chair of the Science and Technology Studies department
- Gerard Salton (professor of Computer Science) — father of information retrieval; recipient of Guggenheim Fellowship (1962), ASIS Award for Best Information Science Paper (1970), Best Information Science Book (1975), the first Gerard Salton Award (named in his honor) for Outstanding Contributions to Information Retrieval (1983), the Alexander von Humboldt Senior Science Award (1988), the ASIS Award of Merit (1989); ACM Fellow
- David Shmoys (professor of Operations Research and Information Engineering) — ACM Fellow and INFORMS Fellow, and recipient of the Frederick W. Lanchester Prize (2013)
- Fred B. Schneider (Samuel B Eckert Professor of Computer Science) — member of the National Academy of Engineering (2011)
- Éva Tardos (Jacob Gould Schurman Professor of Computer Science) — recipient of the Fulkerson Prize (1988), the George B. Dantzig Prize (2006) and the Gödel Prize (2012); member of the National Academy of Sciences, the National Academy of Engineering, the American Academy of Arts and Sciences; Fellow of the American Mathematical Society and of the Association for Computing Machinery (ACM)
- Robert Tarjan (assistant professor of Computer Science 1973–1974) — computer scientist and mathematician, known for discovering several graph algorithms, including Tarjan's off-line least common ancestors algorithm; co-inventor of splay trees and Fibonacci heaps; Distinguished University Professor of Computer Science at Princeton University; recipient of Turing Award (1986)
- Tim Teitelbaum (professor of Computer Science) — known for his early work on integrated development environments (IDEs), syntax-directed editing, and incremental computation
- David P. Williamson (professor of Operations Research and Information Engineering) — Editor-in-chief of the SIAM Journal on Discrete Mathematics; recipient of the Fulkerson Prize (2000) and the Frederick W. Lanchester Prize (2013)
- Theodore Paul Wright (acting president, 1951) — aeronautical engineer and educator

=== Engineering ===
- Lynden Archer (Joseph Silbert Dean of Engineering, David Croll Director of the Energy Systems Institute and James A. Friend Family Distinguished Professor of Engineering) — member of the National Academy of Engineering (2018)
- Henry G. Booker (professor of Electrical Engineering 1948–1965) — member of the National Academy of Sciences (1960)
- Lance Collins (Joseph Silbert Dean of Engineering, 2010–2020)
- Susan Daniel (professor of Chemical and Biomolecular Engineering)
- David Erickson (professor of mechanical and aerospace engineering)
- Lov Grover (professor of Electrical and Computer Engineering)
- Zygmunt J. Haas (professor emeritus of Electrical and Computer Engineering) — engineer and scientist; contributor to Ad Hoc Networks and Wireless Sensor Networks; inventor of the Zone Routing Protocol
- David A. Hammer (professor of Nuclear Energy Engineering)
- Mark E. Lewis (professor of Operations Research and Information Engineering)
- Chekesha Liddell (professor, Materials Science and Engineering)
- Hod Lipson (professor of Mechanical Engineering)
- Michal Lipson (professor 2001–2014) — MacArthur Award, research into nanotech applications to optics
- Carlo Montemagno (professor of Biological and Environmental Engineering 1995–2001, director of Biomedical Engineering) — "father of bionanotechnology"
- Christopher Ober (professor, Materials Science and Engineering)
- Richard D. Robinson (associate professor of Materials Science and Engineering)
- Britney Schmidt (associate professor of astronomy, earth, and atmospheric sciences)
- Peter C. Schultz (Materials Science Visiting Professor 1978–1984) — co-inventor of the fiber optics now used worldwide for telecommunications; member of the National Academy of Engineering, inductee to the National Inventors Hall of Fame, recipient of the National Medal of Technology and Innovation (2000)
- William R. Sears — notable aeronautical engineer and educator; member of the National Academy of Sciences, the National Academy of Engineering, and the American Academy of Arts and Sciences
- Huili Grace Xing (William L. Quackenbush Professor of Electrical and Computer Engineering and Materials Science and Engineering)
- Fengqi You (Roxanne E. and Michael J. Zak Professor)

== Government, law, business ==
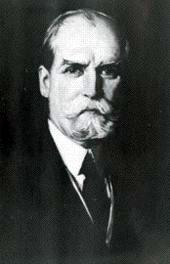
Chief Justice Charles Evans Hughes

- Iajuddin Ahmed (visiting professor, 1984) — president of Bangladesh, 2002–09
- Ifeoma Ajunwa — organizational behavior, law
- Alfred C. Aman Jr. (professor, 1977–91) — dean of Suffolk University Law School and Indiana University School of Law
- G. Robert Blakey — professor of law and director of the Cornell Institute on Organized Crime (1973–80) — author of the RICO statute and chief counsel to House Select Committee on Assassinations
- Herbert W. Briggs (professor of Government 1929–1969) — prominent in international law
- George W. Casey Jr. (distinguished senior lecturer) — chief of staff of the United States Army, 2007–11; Commander of Multi-National Force — Iraq, 2004–07
- David J. Danelski (Goldwin Smith Professor of Government, 1970–79) — constitutional law, civil rights lawyer, University Ombudsman
- Michael J. Freeman (assistant professor) — inventor; business consultant, behavior sciences
- Benjamin Ginsberg (professor of Government, 1973–c. 1992) — American government
- Andrew Hacker (professor) — political scientist; questioned race, class, and gender in American society
- Harry George Henn
- Robert C. Hockett
- Charles Evans Hughes (professor, Law School, 1891–93) — governor of New York, 1907–10; U.S. Supreme Court associate justice, 1910–16; U.S. presidential candidate, 1916; U.S. secretary of state, 1921–25; chief justice of the United States, 1930–41
- Irving Ives (trustee; dean of Industrial & Labor Relations, 1945–47) — U.S. senator from New York, 1947–59; namesake of Ives Hall
- William A. Jacobson — attorney, Cornell Law School professor, and blogger
- Robert Jarrow (Ronald P. and Susan E. Lynch Professor of Investment Management at the Samuel Curtis Johnson Graduate School of Management) — expert on derivative securities; co-developer of Heath-Jarrow-Morton framework and Jarrow-Turnbull model
- George McTurnan Kahin (professor of Government, 1951–88) — expert on Southeast Asia and critic of the Vietnam War
- Alfred E. Kahn (Robert Julius Thorne — professor emeritus of Political Economy; trustee; dean of Arts & Sciences) — advisor to President Jimmy Carter on deregulation; economist
- Peter J. Katzenstein (Walter S. Carpenter Jr. Professor of International Studies, 1973–, Stephen H. Weiss Presidential Fellow) — international relations; Johan Skytte Prize in Political Science (2020)
- Milton R. Konvitz — head of Liberian codification project
- Isaac Kramnick (Richard J. Schwartz Professor of Government Emeritus, 1972–2015) — English and American political thought and history; fellow of the American Academy of Arts and Sciences (1998)
- Theodore J. Lowi ( John L. Senior Professor of American Institutions, 1959–1965, 1972–2015, Emeritus –2017) — American government and public policy; president of the American Political Science Association (1991)
- Cynthia McKinney (Frank H. T. Rhodes Class of '56 University Professor, 2003–06) — U.S. representative from Georgia, 1993–2003, 2005–2007
- Edwin Barber Morgan (trustee, 1865–74) — U.S. Representative from New York, 1853–59; Director of American Express
- Robert Parris Moses (Frank H. T. Rhodes Class of '56 Professor, 2006–) — a leader of the Civil Rights Movement; creator of the Algebra Project; MacArthur "genius"
- John Nesheim — venture capitalist, teaches classes on entrepreneurship
- Richard Neustadt (professor of Public Administration, 1952?–54?) — political scientist specializing in the United States presidency; advised presidents John F. Kennedy, Lyndon Johnson, and Bill Clinton
- Frances Perkins (lecturer of Industrial & Labor Relations (?–1965) — U.S. Secretary of Labor, 1933-45); first female U.S. Cabinet member
- Aziz Rana (professor of Law, ?–2022)
- Richard Rosecrance (Walter S. Carpenter Jr. Professor of International and Comparative Politics, 1970s and 1980s) — international relations
- Clinton Rossiter (professor of Government, 1946–70) — political scientist
- Myron Rush (professor of Government, 1965–1992) — the politics and foreign policy of the Soviet Union
- Frederick A. Sawyer (professor) — Assistant Secretary of the Treasury, 1873–74; Senator from South Carolina, 1968–73
- Martin Shefter (professor of Government, 1986–) — political scientist
- Arthur E. Sutherland Jr. (professor of Law, 1945–1950) — constitutional and commercial law expert and author; Harvard Law School professor (1950–1970)
- Lynn Stout — Distinguished Professor of Corporate & Business Law
- Jessica Chen Weiss — Michael J. Zak Professor for China and Asia-Pacific Studies

== Humanities ==
=== Architecture and design ===
- Esra Akcan — Michael A. McCarthy Professor
- Bristow Adams (professor, 1914–45) — journalist, professor, forester, illustrator
- Buckminster Fuller (professor) — architect and inventor, known for work with geodesic domes
- Romaldo Giurgola (professor) — architect, winner of the AIA Gold Medal
- Valerio Olgiati (guest professor, 2005) — architect and professor
- Colin Rowe (professor, 1970s) — architectural historian and theoretician
- Oswald Mathias Ungers (professor, 1968–1976) — architect
- Raphael Zuber (assistant, 2005) — architect

=== Fine arts and photography ===
- Michael Ashkin — sculptor
- Jacqueline Livingston (professor of Photography and Art (?–1978) — feminist photographer
- Alison Lurie (professor of Literature, 1970–) — Pulitzer Prize-winning author
- Jason Seley (professor of Art 1966–1983, dean 1980–1983) — sculptor

=== History ===
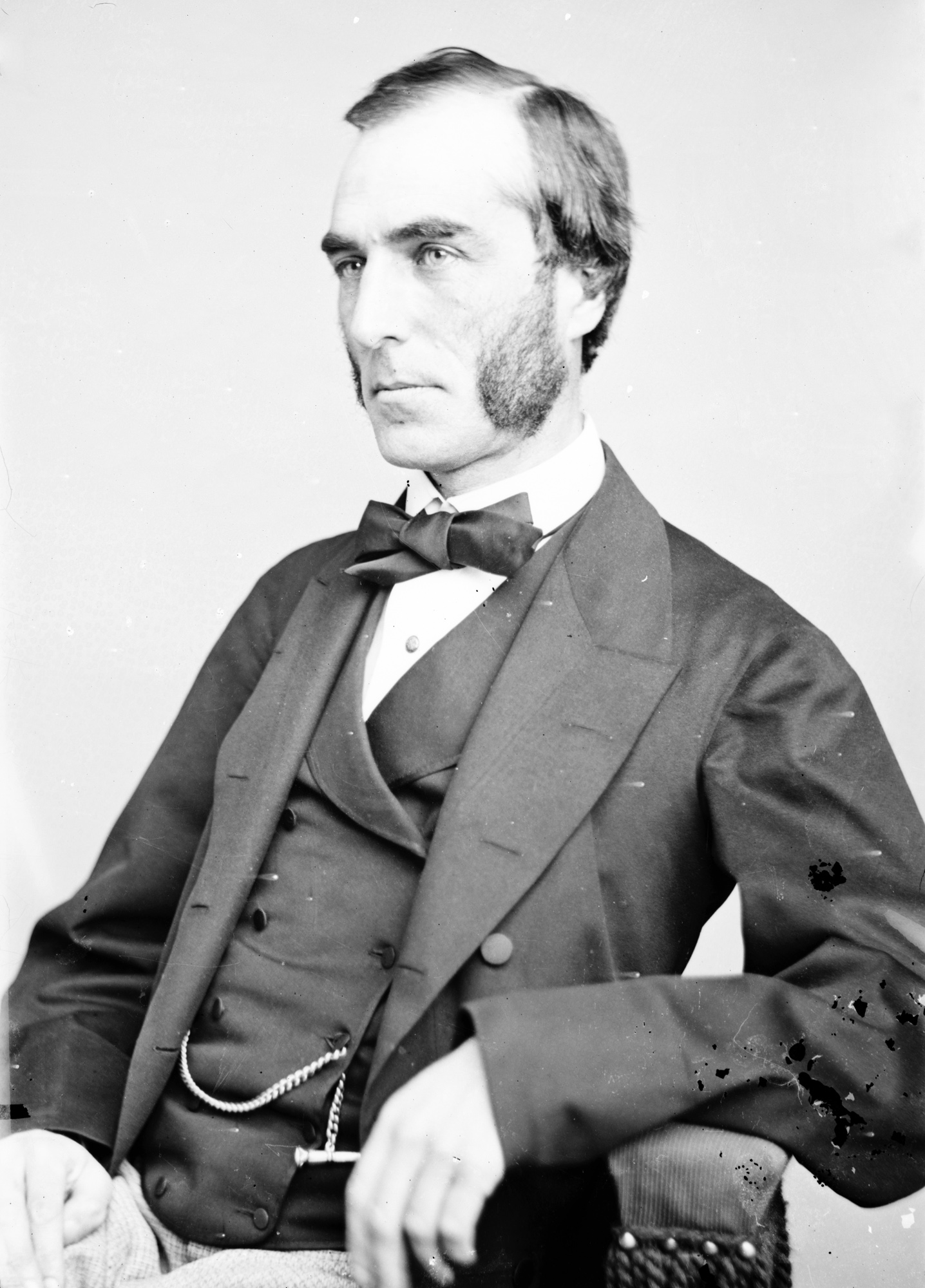
Goldwin Smith

- Felix Adler (professor of Hebrew and Oriental Literature, 1874–76) — early 20th-century Jewish rationalist and social reformer
- Glenn C. Altschuler — Thomas and Dorothy Litwin Professor of American Studies; Weiss Presidential Fellow; dean of the School of Continuing Education and Summer Sessions at Cornell University
- Carl L. Becker (John Wendell Anderson Professor of History, 1917–41) — historian; namesake of Carl Becker House
- Martin Bernal (1972–2001) — professor of modern Chinese history; author of Black Athena
- Sherman Cochran — Hu Shih Professor Emeritus of Chinese history
- David Brion Davis (professor of History, 1955–1969) — 1967 Pulitzer Prize winner; scholar of slavery and American intellectual history; National Humanities Medal (2014)
- Anthony Grafton (professor) — a leading scholar of the Renaissance
- D. G. E. Hall — emeritus professor of Southeast Asian History
- Charles Henry Hull (1864–1936) — professor of American History, dean of the Arts and Sciences College
- Donald Kagan (professor 1960–1969) — classicist; National Humanities Medal (2002)
- Michael Kammen (professor of History) — 1973 Pulitzer Prize winner; U.S. Constitution scholar
- Bernard Lewis (professor 1986–1990) — recipient of National Humanities Medal (2006), Harvey Prize (1978)
- Mostafa Minawi (professor of History) — Ottoman History
- Benzion Netanyahu (professor of History 1971–1975) — professor emeritus of history at Cornell University; father of Israeli Prime Minister Benjamin Netanyahu
- Walter LaFeber (Steven Weiss Presidential Teaching Fellow of History, 1958–2006) — U.S. foreign policy historian
- Fredrik Logevall — (John S. Knight Professor of International Studies) — 2013 Pulitzer Prize winner
- Mary Beth Norton (Mary Donlon Alger Professor Emeritus of American History, 1971–) — American colonial history, women's history; fellow of the American Academy of Arts and Sciences (1999), president of the American Historical Association (2016)
- Richard Polenberg (Goldwin Smith Professor of American History, 1966–2011, Marie Underhill Noll Professor of History Emeritus, –2020) — 20th-century American history
- Hunter R. Rawlings III — 10th president of Cornell University
- Joel H. Silbey (President White Professor of History Emeritus, 1966–2002) — 19th century American history
- Goldwin Smith (professor of English and Constitutional History, 1868–71) — historian; university reformer; namesake of Goldwin Smith Hall
- Carl Stephenson (professor of Medieval History, 1930–54?) — early 20th-century medievalist
- John Szarkowski (A. D. White Professor-at-Large, 1983–89) — photography curator, historian, and critic
- Eric Tagliacozzo — historian of modern Southeast Asia
- Herbert Tuttle (professor of international law) — 19th-century historian, author
- Andrew Dickson White — first president of Cornell University; first president of the American Historical Association
- L. Pearce Williams (John Stambaugh Professor of the History of Science, 1960–1994, Emeritus –2015) — history of Western civilization, history of science
- O. W. Wolters — 20th-century historian of early Southeast Asia

=== Languages ===
- Herbert Deinert — emeritus professor of German Studies

=== Literature ===
- M. H. Abrams — author of the Mirror and the Lamp; literary critic; fellow of the American Academy of Arts and Sciences; recipient of National Humanities Medal (2013)
- Frederick Ahl (professor of Classics and Comparative Literature) — classics scholar
- Charles Edwin Bennett (Goldwin Smith Professor of Latin, 1892–?) — classicist
- Thomas G. Bergin (professor of Romance Languages) — author and translator
- Hjalmar Hjorth Boyesen (professor of North European Languages, 1874–1880) — author
- Hiram Corson (professor) — professor of literature
- Jonathan Culler (professor) — literary critic and theorist
- Louis Dyer (acting professor of Greek, 1895–96) — educator and author
- Roberto González Echevarría (faculty 1971–1977) — literature critic; member of the American Academy of Arts and Sciences and recipient of the National Humanities Medal (2010)
- Max Farrand (professor) — author of American historical subjects
- Emily Fridlund — author of History of Wolves
- Alice Fulton (professor of Creative Writing) — poet, fiction writer, MacArthur Award (1991)
- Henry Louis Gates Jr. (professor, 1985–90) — Afro-American Studies scholar; MacArthur Fellow (1981)
- Robert Kaske (professor, 1963–74; Avalon Professor in the Humanities, 1974–89) — scholar of medieval literature
- Victor Lange (professor) — professor of modern languages
- Alison Lurie (professor of Creative Writing, 1968–) — fiction writer, winner of the Pulitzer Prize for Fiction
- Paul de Man (professor) — professor of Comparative Literature
- Vladimir Nabokov (professor of European and Russian Literature, 1948–58) — author of the novel Lolita
- Adrienne Rich (A. D. White Professor-at-Large, 1981–87) — feminist poet
- Noliwe Rooks — (W. E. B. Du Bois Professor of Literature) — interdisciplinary scholar
- Edgar Rosenberg (professor, 1965–2002) — emeritus professor of English and Comparative Literature, awarded Guggenheim Fellowship in 1973
- William Sale Jr. (Goldwin Smith Professor of English, 1959; professor emeritus, 1968)
- Nathaniel Schmidt (professor of Semitic Languages and Literatures) — American orientalist
- William De Witt Snodgrass (professor, 1955–57) — poet, winner of the Pulitzer Prize for Poetry
- Melanie Thernstrom (professor) — author and freelance journalist
- Alvin Toffler (professor) — writer, sociologist, and futurist; Future Shock
- Helena Maria Viramontes (professor of English) — Chicana fiction writer
- Wendy Wasserstein (A. D. White Professor-at-Large, 2005–06) — Tony Award and Pulitzer Prize-winning playwright

=== Music ===
- Malcolm Bilson (professor) — music historian
- David Borden (director, Digital Music Program) — composer of minimalist music
- Donald Byrd — jazz trumpeter and educator
- Adolf Dahm-Petersen — voice specialist and teacher of artistic singing
- Karel Husa (professor, 1954–1992) — composer best known for his Music for Prague 1968; won the 1969 Pulitzer Prize for his String Quartet No. 3
- Hunter Johnson (professor) — composer
- Alejandro L. Madrid (professor) — musicologist and ethnomusicologist — recipient of the Dent Medal (2017)
- Wynton Marsalis (AD White Professor-at-Large, 2015–2021) — Classical and Jazz musician, composer
- James Thomas Quarles — organist and music educator
- Steven Stucky — Pulitzer Prize-winning composer

=== Philosophy ===
- Kwame Anthony Appiah (professor, 1986–89) — African Studies philosopher and novelist; National Humanities Medal (2012)
- Max Black
- Allan Bloom (professor, 1963–70) — philosophy and government, author of Closing of the American Mind, recipient of the National Humanities Medal (1992)
- Richard Boyd (Susan Linn Sage Professor of Philosophy and Humane Letters Emeritus, 1972–2017) — philosopher of epistemology
- Judith Butler — philosophy 2003–2007; Andrew White Professor at Large
- Edwin Arthur Burtt (professor) — Susan Linn Sage Professor of Philosophy in 1941, author of works on philosophy
- Harold F. Cherniss (professor) — author and expert on the philosophy of Ancient Greece
- Morris Raphael Cohen (lecturer) — Jewish philosopher, lawyer and legal scholar
- James Edwin Creighton (professor) — philosopher
- Werner J. Dannhauser (professor, 1968–92) — political philosophy, expert on Nietzsche and on Judaism and politics
- Terence Irwin
- Anthony Kenny
- Norman Kretzmann
- David Lyons (professor of Philosophy, 1964–1995) —joint appointment in College of Arts and Sciences and School of Law
- Norman Malcolm (professor, 1947–58) — Ludwig Wittgenstein scholar
- Evander Bradley McGilvary (Susan Linn Sage Professor of Ethics, 1899–1905) — philosophical scholar
- John Rawls (professor) — philosopher; author of A Theory of Justice, Political Liberalism, and The Law of Peoples; National Humanities Medal (1999); namesake of Asteroid 16561 Rawls
- Sydney Shoemaker (Susan Linn Sage Professor of Philosophy) — philosopher and metaphysician
- Jason Stanley
- Brian Weatherson (associate professor of Philosophy) — philosopher, metaphysician
- Allen W. Wood (professor of Philosophy, 1968–1996) — leading scholar on Kant

== Media ==
=== Journalism, film, television, theatre ===
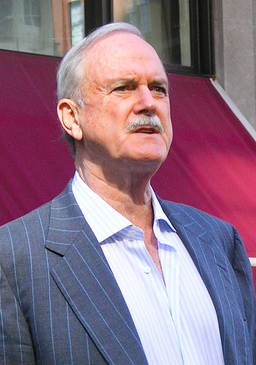
John Cleese

- John Cleese (A. D. White Professor-at-Large, 1999–2006; Provost's Visiting Professor, 2006–) — comedian and actor
- David Feldshuh — playwright
- John Pilger (Frank H. T. Rhodes Class of '56 University Professor, 2003–06) — journalist and documentary filmmaker
- Amy Villarejo (Frederic J. Whiton Professor of Humanities, 1997–2020) — researcher of feminist and queer media, critical theory, and television studies

== Natural sciences and related fields ==
=== Astronomy ===
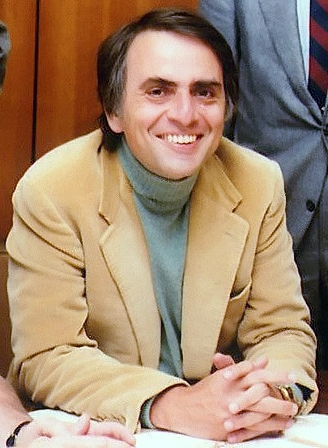
Carl Sagan

- Joseph A. Burns (professor of Astronomy, c. 1969–) — dual appointment with the Sibley School of Mechanical and Aerospace Engineering
- James L. Elliot (former postdoctoral fellow, Faculty) — astrophysicist; discoverer of the ring system of Uranus while at Cornell; discoverer of the atmosphere of Pluto
- Riccardo Giovanelli (professor of Astronomy 1991–) — Henry Draper Medal recipient (1989)
- Thomas Gold (John L. Wetherill Professor of Astronomy, 1959–2004) — astrophysicist, coined the term "magnetosphere"; member of the National Academy of Sciences (1968)
- Martha P. Haynes (Goldwin Smith Professor of Astronomy) — Henry Draper Medal recipient (1989), member of the National Academy of Sciences (2000)
- Jonathan Lunine (David C. Duncan Professor in the Physical Sciences) — Harold C. Urey Prize recipient (1988), member of the National Academy of Sciences (2010), fellow of the American Association for the Advancement of Science and the American Geophysical Union
- Jean-Luc Margot (assistant professor) — astronomer, awarded the H. C. Urey Prize by the American Astronomical Society, 2004
- Carl Sagan (David Duncan Professor of Astronomy and Space Sciences, 1968–96) — space sciences
- Edwin Ernest Salpeter (James Gilbert White Distinguished Professor of the Physical Sciences Emeritus, 1948–2008) — astronomer; Crafoord Prize (1997), member of the National Academy of Sciences (1967)
- Saul Teukolsky (professor 1974–) — theoretical astrophysicist and co-author of Numerical Recipes; member of the National Academy of Sciences (2003)
- Aleksander Wolszczan (professor) — discoverer of first extrasolar planets and pulsar planets

=== Biology, ecology, botany, and nutrition ===
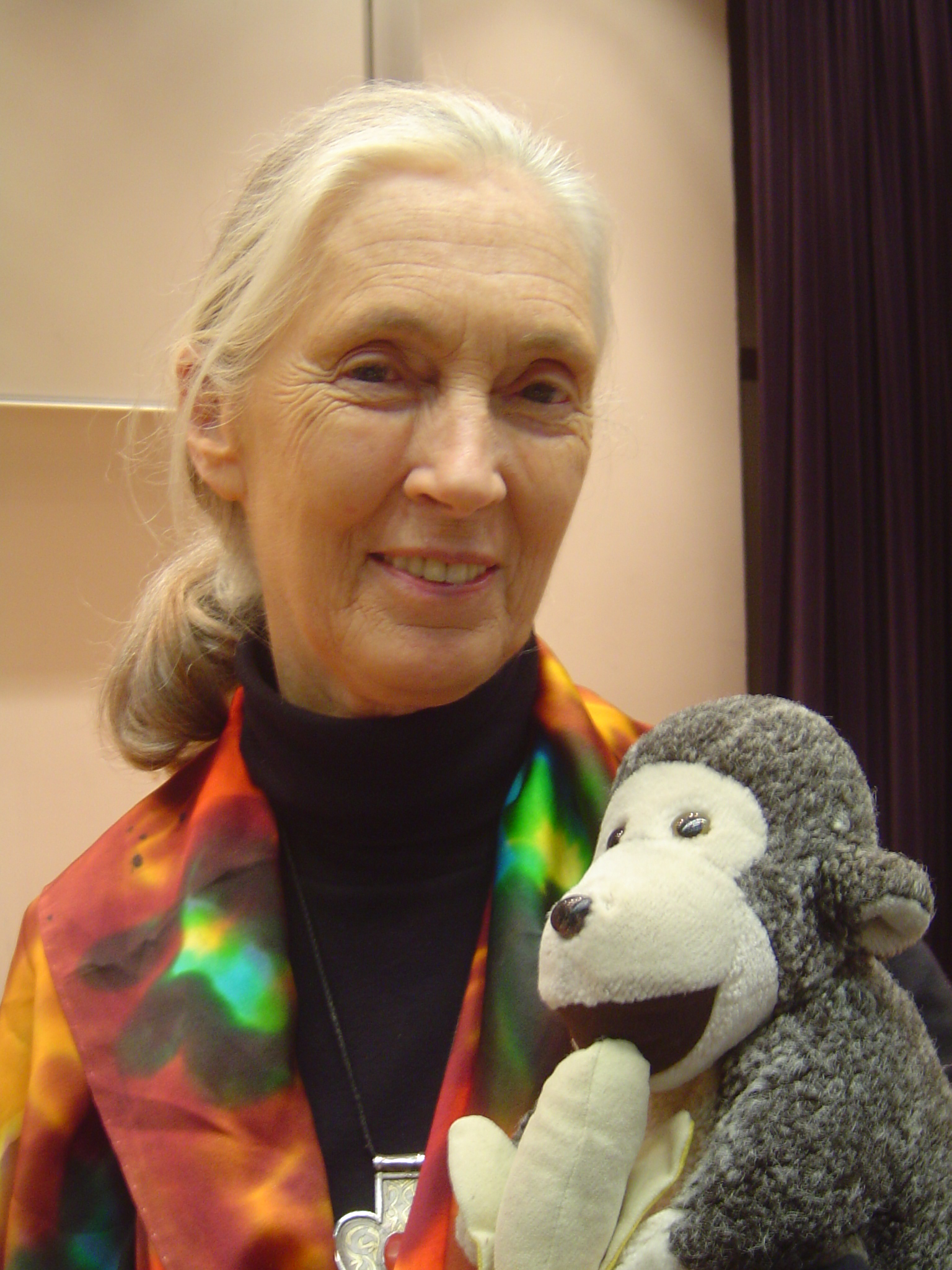
Jane Goodall

- Louis Agassiz (lecturer) — zoologist, glaciologist, and geologist
- Liberty Hyde Bailey (professor) — botanist, early progenitor of the 4-H movement, namesake of Bailey Hall; member of the National Academy of Sciences (1917)
- Joan Jacobs Brumberg (Stephen H. Weiss Presidential Fellow; Professor of History, Human Development, and Gender Studies, 1979–) — scholar in adolescence, body image and eating disorders, and related fields
- T. Colin Campbell (professor) — nutritionist; director of the China Project;author of The China Study
- William Henry Chandler (professor 1913–1923) — botanist in pomology; member of the National Academy of Sciences (1943)
- Anna Botsford Comstock — nature studies, appointed first woman assistant professor at Cornell (1899), full professor (1920)
- Derrill M. Daniel (assistant professor of entomology) — US Army major general
- Thomas Eisner (Jacob Gould Schurman Professor of Chemical Ecology) — pioneer of chemical ecology; member of the National Academy of Sciences (1969), recipient of the National Medal of Science (1994)
- Rollins A. Emerson (professor 1914–1942) — member of the National Academy of Sciences (1927)
- Barton Warren Evermann (lecturer, 1900–03) — ichthyologist
- Claudia Fischbach (professor) James M. and Marsha McCormick Director of Biomedical Engineering and the Stanley Bryer 1946 Professor of Biomedical Engineering
- Martin Gibbs (professor 1956–1964) — member of the National Academy of Sciences (1974)
- Jane Goodall (A. D. White Professor-at-Large, 1996–2002) — naturalist
- Everett Peter Greenberg (faculty 1978–1988) — American microbiologist who received the Shaw Prize in 2015; member of the National Academy of Sciences and fellow of the American Academy of Arts and Sciences
- Donald Griffin (professor) — zoologist, member of the National Academy of Sciences (1960)
- Ann Hajek (Professor) — entomologist
- Maria Harrison (William H. Crocker Research Chair) — plant biologist, member of the National Academy of Sciences (2019)
- Franz-Ulrich Hartl (professor 1991–1997) — director of the Max Planck Institute of Biochemistry in Martinsried, Germany (1997–); recipient of Gottfried Wilhelm Leibniz-Prize (2002), Gairdner Foundation International Award (2004), Albert Lasker Award for Basic Medical Research (2011), Shaw Prize (2012), etc., member of the American Academy of Arts and Sciences (2000) and the National Academy of Sciences (2011)
- Charles Frederick Hartt (professor, 1868–?) — Canadian-American geologist, palaeontologist and naturalist who specialized in the geology of Brazil
- Robert W. Howarth (professor) — biogeochemist
- Maria Jasin (professor, Weill Cornell Graduate School of Medical Sciences) — member of the National Academy of Sciences (2015) and of the American Academy of Arts and Sciences (2017); recipient of the Shaw Prize in Life Sciences (2019)
- William Tinsley Keeton (professor) — expert in animal navigation, namesake of William Keeton House
- Graham Kerr (professor, 1973) — chef, "The Galloping Gourmet"
- Simon A. Levin (professor 1965–1992) — recipient of the National Medal of Science (2015), Tyler Prize for Environmental Achievement (2014), Kyoto Prize (2005)
- Gene Likens (professor of Ecology, 1969–1983; adjunct professor 1983–) — ecologist; member of American Academy of Arts and Sciences, National Academy of Sciences, Royal Swedish Academy of Sciences; recipient of National Medal of Science (2001), Tyler Prize for Environmental Achievement (1993), BBVA Foundation Frontiers of Knowledge Award (2016)
- John T. Lis (faculty 1978–) — Guggenheim Fellow (2000), member of the National Academy of Sciences (2015)
- Yiqi Luo (professor) — Liberty Hyde Bailey Professor at the School of Integrative Plant Science, Soil and Crop Sciences
- Thomas Lyttleton Lyon − emeritus professor of Soils Science for the Department of Agriculture; co-winner of the Howard N. Potts Medal (1913)
- Jerrold Meinwald (professor emeritus of Chemistry) — chemical ecologist; member of the National Academy of Sciences (1969) and the American Philosophical Society (1987); fellow of the American Academy of Arts and Sciences (1970); recipient of the National Medal of Science (2014)
- Gero Miesenböck (assistant professor of Cell Biology and Genetics; assistant professor of Neuroscience 1999–2004) — recipient of the Brain Prize (2013) and BBVA Foundation Frontiers of Knowledge Award (2015)
- John Keith Moffat — Guggenheim Fellow, former associate professor in Biochemistry, Molecular, and Cell Biology at Cornell, later deputy provost at University of Chicago, noted for Advanced Photon Source and Time resolved crystallography
- Corrie Moreau (professor 2019–) — myrmecologist / ant researcher; fellow of the American Association for the Advancement of Science, Entomological Society of America fellow, Royal Entomological Society fellow
- Rebecca J. Nelson (associate professor of Plant Pathology, Plant Breeding and International Agriculture) — MacArthur Fellow (1998); researcher in crop disease resistance
- Karl J. Niklas (Liberty Hyde Bailey Professor in the Department of Plant Biology)
- Katharine Payne (researcher at Bio-acoustics Research Program, Lab of Ornithology) — whale and elephant researcher
- David Peakall (1968–1975 Laboratory of Ornithology, senior research associate in the Section of Ecology and Systematics in the Biological Sciences Division)
- Pinstrup-Andersen Per (professor of Food Economics 1987–1992, H.E. Babcock Professor of Food, Nutrition and Public Policy 2003–2013, professor emeritus and graduate school professor 2013–) — recipient of the World Food Prize (2001)
- Donald W. Roberts – former adjunct professor, Department of Entomology and Department of Plant Pathology
- Wendell L. Roelofs (professor) — recipient of Alexander von Humboldt Award (1977), Wolf Prize in Agriculture (1982), National Medal of Science (1983)
- Benoît Roux (professor) — molecular biologist; winner of the Rutherford Memorial Medal in Chemistry, 1998) from the Royal Society of Canada
- W. Mark Saltzman (BP Amoco/H. Laurance Fuller Chair 1996–2002) — member of the National Academy of Medicine (2014) and of the National Academy of Engineering (2018)
- John C. Sanford (professor, 1980–98) — inventor of the gene gun
- Harold Hill Smith (professor) — geneticist
- Steven D. Tanksley (Liberty Hyde Bailey Professor of Plant Breeding, 1985–) — plant breeding and agronomy researcher; recipient of Alexander von Humboldt Foundation Award, Martin Gibbs Medal of the American Society of Plant Biologists, the Wolf Prize in Agriculture and the Japan Prize, member of the National Academy of Sciences
- Stanley Temple (1975–1976 research associate) — avian ecologist
- Helen Turley — winemaker
- Herbert John Webber (Professor, 1907–1912) — plant physiologist, developed the citrange
- Robert Whittaker (professor) — vegetation ecologist; member of the National Academy of Sciences (1975)
- Burt Green Wilder (professor of Neurology and Vertebrate Zoology, 1867–1910) — comparative anatomist
- Charles Edward Stevens (chairman of Physiology, Biology and Pharmacology, 1961–1979) — Fulbright Scholar and internationally recognized expert in the field of comparative physiology and digestive systems.
- Bruce Wallace (professor of genetics 1958–1981) — member of the National Academy of Sciences (1970)
- Hao Wu (faculty 1997–2012, Weill Cornell Medical College) — member of the National Academy of Sciences (2015)
- Donald Zilversmit (professor 1966–1990) — nutritional biochemist; member of the National Academy of Sciences (1989)

=== Chemistry ===
- Héctor D. Abruña (Emile M. Chamot Professor of Chemistry) — member of the National Academy of Sciences (2018)
- Geoffrey W. Coates (Tisch University Professor in Chemistry) — member of the American Academy of Arts and Sciences and of the National Academy of Sciences (2017)
- Wilder Dwight Bancroft (professor, 1895–1937) — physical chemist
- Thomas Bruice (professor of Chemistry 1960–1964) — member of the National Academy of Sciences (1974)
- James Crafts (professor of Chemistry, 1868–97) — president of MIT, 1897–1900
- Jean Fréchet (professor 1987–1998) — Japan Prize (2013); fellow of the American Association for the Advancement of Science, American Chemical Society, and American Academy of Arts and Sciences, member of National Academy of Sciences and National Academy of Engineering
- Gordon Hammes (biochemist 1965–1988) — member of the National Academy of Sciences (1973)
- James L. Hoard (chemistry professor 1936–1971) — National Academy of Sciences (1972)
- John R. Johnson (professor 1927–1965) — chemist; member of the National Academy of Sciences (1948)
- John Gamble Kirkwood (professor) — chemist
- Stephen Lee (professor of Solid State Chemistry) — MacArthur Award and Sloan Fellow
- Franklin A. Long (professor and chairman of Chemistry) — member of the National Academy of Sciences (1962)
- Jerrold Meinwald (professor of Chemistry 1960s–) — member of the National Academy of Sciences and the American Philosophical Society, fellow of the American Academy of Arts and Sciences and the American Association for the Advancement of Science, recipient of the National Medal of Science (2014) and Chemical Pioneer Award of the American Institute of Chemists (1997)
- Earl Muetterties (professor 1973–1978) — member of the National Academy of Sciences (1971)
- Gregory Petsko (Arthur J. Mahon Professor of Neurology and Neuroscience at Weill Cornell Medical College 2012–) — member of the National Academy of Sciences (1995)
- Efraim Racker (professor of Biochemistry) — founder of the biochemistry department at Cornell University; member of the American Academy of Arts and Sciences and the National Academy of Sciences; recipient of Warren Triennial Prize (1974), National Medal of Science (1976), Gairdner Award (1980)
- Frank Spedding (George Fisher Baker assistant professor 1935–1937) — member of the National Academy of Sciences (1952)
- Benjamin Widom (professor of Chemistry 1955–)

=== Geology and geography ===
- Heinrich Ries (professor, 1898–?) — economic geologist
- Ralph Stockman Tarr (professor, 1897–?) — geographer

=== Mathematics ===
- Kenneth Brown (professor of Mathematics, 1971–2014, Emeritus–) — algebra, topology, group theory; fellow of the American Mathematical Society (2012)
- William J. Cook (assistant professor 1985–1987) — university professor of the University of Waterloo, member of the National Academy of Engineering, American Mathematical Society fellow, INFORMS Fellow and SIAM fellow, recipient of the Frederick W. Lanchester Prize of INFORMS (2007)
- Eugene Dynkin (professor) — mathematician
- Walter T. Federer (professor of Biological Statistics, 1948-86; professor Eeeritus, 1986–2008; Liberty Hyde Bailey Professor of Statistics Chair, 1978-86 ) — statistician, fellow of American Statistical Association, American Association for the Advancement of Science, Royal Statistical Society, Institute of Mathematical Statistics
- Walter Feit (professor, 1952–64) — mathematician, co-author of the Feit–Thompson theorem
- William Feller (professor 1945–1950) — mathematician, known in probability theory; recipient of the National Medal of Science (1969), member of the National Academy of Sciences (1960)
- Richard S. Hamilton — mathematician who laid groundwork for the Poincaré conjecture proof
- Allen Hatcher (professor, 1985–) — mathematician, proved the Smale conjecture (1983)
- Timothy Healey (professor) — applied mathematician
- Kiyosi Itô (professor 1969–1975) — Wolf Prize in Mathematics (1987) and Kyoto Prize (1998); member of the National Academy of Sciences (1998)
- John Irwin Hutchinson (professor of Mathematics, 1894–?) — mathematician
- Mark Kac (faculty 1939–1961) — member of the National Academy of Sciences (1965)
- Jack Kiefer (professor of Mathematics 1952–1979) — fellow of the American Academy of Arts and Sciences and member of the National Academy of Sciences; president of the Institute of Mathematical Statistics (1969–1970)
- Anthony W. Knapp (professor of Mathematics, 1967–1990) — representation theory; fellow of the American Mathematical Society (2012)
- Saunders Mac Lane (professor) — developer of algebra's category theory; recipient of the National Medal of Science (1989)
- Greg Lawler (professor 2001–2006) — Wolf Prize in Mathematics recipient (2019)
- Kathryn Mann (assistant professor 2019–) — mathematician
- Amy McCune (professor) — evolutionary biologist and senior associate dean of the Cornell College of Agriculture and Life Sciences
- Justin T. Moore (professor 2007–) — set theorist and logician, known for his solution to the problem of constructing an L-space.; recipient of the Young Scholar's Competition award in 2006, in Vienna, Austria
- Marston Morse (instructor 1920–1922, assistant professor 1922–1925) — mathematician, known for Morse theory in differential topology; recipient of Bôcher Memorial Prize (1933); National Medal of Science (1964)
- George Nemhauser (Leon C. Welch endowed chair 1970–1983) — president of the Operations Research Society of America; member of the National Academy of Engineering (1986) and recipient of John von Neumann Theory Prize (2012)
- Anil Nerode (Goldwin Smith Professor of Mathematics) — mathematical logic; fellow of the American Mathematical Society (2012); longest tenure as active faculty member at Cornell in any discipline
- Piergiorgio Odifreddi (professor) — mathematician
- Paul Olum (professor) — mathematician, president of the University of Oregon 1980-89
- Joseph Slepian (instructor) — mathematician
- Frank Spitzer (professor 1961–1992) — member of the National Academy of Sciences (1981)
- Robert Strichartz (professor of Mathematics, 1969–2021) — mathematical analysis, fractals; fellow of the American Mathematical Society (2017)
- Steven Strogatz (professor of Theoretical and Applied Mechanics, 1994–) — mathematician
- Éva Tardos (professor of Computer Science) — mathematician, Guggeinheim fellow, winner of the Fulkerson Prize, 1988; member of the National Academy of Engineering (2007)
- William Thurston (professor of Mathematics and Computer Science, 2003–) — mathematician; Fields Medal winner
- Charles F. Van Loan (chair of the Department of Computer Science) — mathematician
- Harry Vandiver (instructor of mathematics 1919–1924) — Cole Prize recipient (1931); member of the National Academy of Sciences (1934)
- Karen Vogtmann (professor, 1994–) — mathematician, American Mathematical Society Fellow, Noether Lecturer (2007), known for Culler–Vogtmann Outer space
- William C. Waterhouse (assistant professor of Mathematics, 1969–75) — modern algebra, exposition, history of mathematics
- Jacob Wolfowitz (professor of Mathematics 1951–1970) — member of the National Academy of Sciences (1974)

=== Medicine ===
- Alexander Gordon Bearn (professor and chairman of the Department of Medicine 1966–1979) — member of the National Academy of Sciences (1972) and the Institute of Medicine
- Edward Boyse (professor of biology 1969–1989) — member of the National Academy of Sciences (1979) and the American Academy of Arts and Sciences, and fellow of the Royal Society
- Eugene Floyd DuBois (faculty at Cornell Medical College) — member of the National Academy of Sciences (1933)
- James Ewing (professor of Clinical Pathology, 1899–1939) — pathologist; discovery of a form of malignant bone tumor that later became known as Ewing sarcoma
- Don W. Fawcett (chair of the Department of Anatomy 1955–1959) — member of the National Academy of Sciences (1972)
- Duane Gish (professor of biomedical science) — prominent for his advocacy of creationist theory
- Elvin A. Kabat (instructor of pathology 1938–1941) — immunologist, member of the National Academy of Sciences (1966) and fellow of the American Academy of Arts and Sciences; president of the American Association of Immunologists (1965–1966); recipient of the Louisa Gross Horwitz Prize (1977) and the National Medal of Science (1991)
- Robert Foster Kennedy (professor of Neurology) — one of the first to use electroconvulsive treatment to treat psychosis; first to link shell shock and hysteria
- Bruce Lerman (the Hilda Altschul Master Professor of Medicine at Weill Cornell Medical College) — cardiologist, chief of the Division of Cardiology and director of the Cardiac Electrophysiology Laboratory at Weill Cornell Medicine and the New York Presbyterian Hospital
- C. Walton Lillehei (Lewis Atterbury Stimson professor and chairman of the surgery department 1967–1975) — American surgeon who pioneered open-heart surgery; recipient of the Harvey Prize (1996), Gairdner Foundation International Award (1963), Lasker Award (1955)
- Walsh McDermott (professor of public health and medicine) — member of the National Academy of Sciences (1967) and the American Academy of Arts and Sciences
- Agnes Claypole Moody — first woman appointed a position in the Medical Department
- Georgios Papanikolaou (researcher at Department of Anatomy, Medical College, 1913–?) — inventor of the Pap smear test for cervical cancer
- Stephen J. Roberts — chairman of the Department of Large Animal Medicine, Obstetrics and Surgery, 1965–1966 and 1969–1972
- Juan Rosai (James Ewing Alumni Professor of Pathology (1991–1999, later adjunct professor of Pathology at the Weill Cornell Medical College) — author and editor of a main textbook in surgical pathology; discoverer of several entities such as Rosai-Dorfman disease and desmoplastic small round cell tumor
- Alexander Rudensky (Tri-Institutional Professor, Microbiology and Immunology, Weill Cornell Medical College 2008–) — recipient of the Crafoord Prize in Polyarthritis (2017); member of the National Academy of Sciences (2012) and the American Academy of Arts and Sciences (2015)
- Tom Shires (chair of Surgery, 1975–91) — trauma surgeon; use of saline solution in shock
- Daniel Stern (adjunct professor of Psychiatry at the Weill Cornell Medical College) — studied early child development
- Ashutosh Tewari (professor of Urology and Public Health)
- Theodore H. Schwartz (professor of Neurosurgery)
- Madelon Lubin Finkel (professor of Clinical Healthcare Policy and Research)
- Carl J. Wiggers (assistant professor 1911–1918) — recipient of Albert Lasker Award for Basic Medical Research; member of the National Academy of Sciences (1951)

=== Physics ===
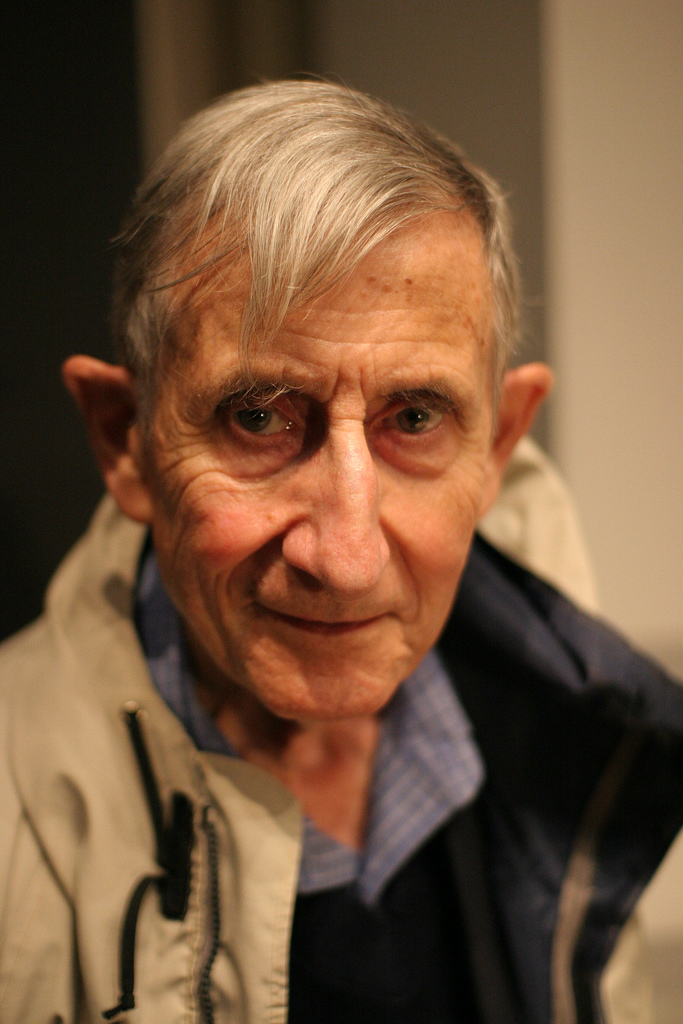
Freeman Dyson

- Neil Ashcroft (professor, 1966–2006) — solid-state physicist and member of the National Academy of Sciences (1997)
- Robert Bacher (professor, 1935–1949) — Manhattan Project leader and member of Atomic Energy Commission; member of the National Academy of Sciences (1947)
- Robert Brout (professor, 1953–1961) — recipient of the Wolf Prize in Physics (2004) and Sakurai Prize (2010) for his significant contributions in elementary particle physics
- Dale R. Corson (professor, 1947–1969, president 1969–1977, chancellor, 1977–1980) — as president, defused riots and armed stand-off in 1969
- Harold Craighead (Charles W. Lake Professor of Engineering, 1989–) — applied physicist
- Persis Drell (professor, 1988–2002) — particle physicist; director of the SLAC National Accelerator Laboratory (2007–2012), dean of the Stanford University School of Engineering (2014–2017) and provost of Stanford University (2017–)
- Gene Dresselhaus (professor) — condensed matter physicist, 2022 Oliver E. Buckley Condensed Matter Physics Prize Recipient
- Freeman Dyson (professor, 1951–1953) — physicist, mathematician; recipient of the Wolf Prize in Physics (1981), Templeton Prize (2000)
- Mitchell Feigenbaum (professor) — physicist whose pioneering studies in chaos theory led to the discovery of the Feigenbaum constant
- Craig Fennie (professor) — applied physicist; MacArthur Fellow (2013)
- Michael Fisher (Horace White Professor of Chemistry, Physics, and Mathematics, 1966–1987) — Irving Langmuir Award (1971), Wolf Prize in Physics (1980), Boltzmann Medal (1983), Lars Onsager Prize (1995), Royal Medal (2005), BBVA Foundation Frontiers of Knowledge Award (2009); Fellow of the American Academy of Arts and Sciences and Member of the National Academy of Sciences
- Peter Goldreich (Thomas Gold Lecturer, 1987) — astrophysicist
- Kurt Gottfried (professor of Physics, 1964–1998, emeritus –2022) — particle physics; co-founder of the Union of Concerned Scientists
- Brian Greene (professor, 1990–1995) — theoretical physicist and author, specializing in string theory
- Alan Guth (1977–1979) — recipient of Fundamental Physics Prize (2012) and Kavli Prize (2014)
- Arthur Kantrowitz (professor, 1946–1956) — physicist and engineer
- Toichiro Kinoshita (professor, 1955–1995) — Japanese-American theoretical physicist; member of the National Academy of Sciences (1991) and recipient of the Sakurai Prize (1990)
- Raphael M. Littauer (professor of Physics and Nuclear Studies, later Emeritus, 1955–2009) — fellow of the American Physical Society (1991), Robert R. Wilson Prize for Achievement in the Physics of Particle Accelerators (1995); introduction of pioneering classroom response system
- M. Stanley Livingston (faculty 1934–1938) — member of the National Academy of Sciences (1970)
- Richard V. E. Lovelace (professor 1984–) — fellow of the American Physical Society (2000)
- Boyce McDaniel (professor, 1946–1985) — Manhattan Project physicist and synchrotron designer; member of the National Academy of Sciences
- Paul McEuen (professor, 2001–) — physicist, specializes in carbon nanotubes and graphene
- David Mermin (professor) — physicist; member of the National Academy of Sciences (1991) and of the American Academy of Arts and Sciences (1988)
- Philip Morrison (professor 1946–1964) — member of the National Academy of Sciences (1971)
- David A Muller (professor) — applied physicist
- Yuri Orlov (researcher of Physics, 1986–) — nuclear physicist; former Soviet dissident; human rights activist
- Edward Ott (faculty of the Department of Electrical Engineering, 1968–1979) — physicist known for his contributions to the development of chaos theory
- Albert Overhauser (faculty, 1953–1958) — physicist, known for Overhauser effect; member of the National Academy of Sciences and fellow of the American Academy of Arts and Sciences; recipient of National Medal of Science (1994) and Oliver E. Buckley Condensed Matter Prize (1975)
- Robert Otto Pohl (Goldwin Smith Professor of Physics, 1960–2000, Emeritus –2024) — condensed matter physics; Oliver E. Buckley Condensed Matter Prize (1985), member of the National Academy of Sciences (1999)
- John Reppy (faculty, 1966–2005) — member of the National Academy of Sciences (1988)
- Bruno Rossi (associate professor 1940–1943) — National Medal of Science (1983), Wolf Prize in Physics (1987)
- Dennis William Sciama (professor) — physicist
- Harold Scheraga (faculty 1947–1992) — member of the National Academy of Sciences (1966)
- George Paget Thomson (non-resident lecturer, 1929–1930) — Nobel Prize, Physics 1937
- Kip Thorne (A. D. White Professor-at-Large, 1986–1992) — astrophysicist
- Watt W. Webb (Engineering Physics Faculty 1961–) — member of the National Academy of Engineering, the National Academy of Sciences, and the American Academy of Arts and Sciences
- Robert R. Wilson (professor) — youngest group leader on the Manhattan Project; first director of Fermilab; National Medal of Science (1973)

== Social sciences and policy management ==
=== Anthropology, sociology, other social sciences ===
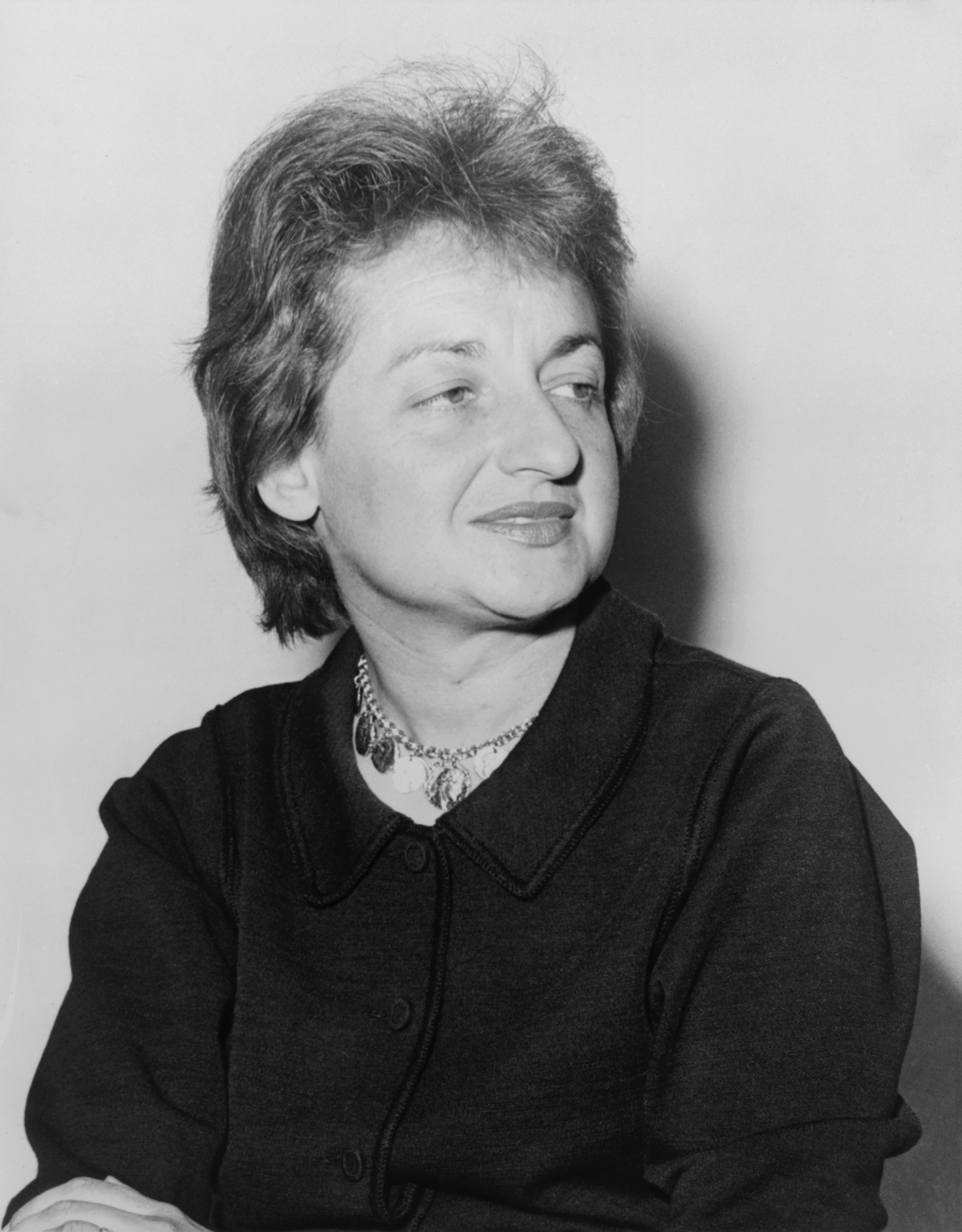
Betty Friedan

- Yutaka Tsujinaka (visiting fellow, 1989–1991) — professor of political science
- John Adair (professor, 1948–1960) — anthropologist
- Benedict Anderson (professor emeritus of International Studies) — author of Imagined Communities
- Walter Berns (professor, 1959–1969) — constitutional law and political philosophy professor; recipient of National Humanities Medal in 2005
- Fred Buttel (professor of Rural Sociology) — sociologist
- John Collier — visual anthropologist
- Dian Fossey (visiting research associate, 1980) — anthropologist whose murder was recreated in the film Gorillas in the Mist
- Betty Friedan (Distinguished Visiting Professor at the ILR School's Institute for Women and Work, 1998–2006) — feminist, author of The Feminine Mystique
- Rose Goldsen — pioneer in studying the effects of television and popular culture
- Charles F. Hockett (professor 1946–1982) — linguist; member of the National Academy of Sciences (1974)
- Jay Jasanoff (professor, 1978–1998) — Indo-European linguistics specialist
- Bronisław Malinowski (lecturer, 1933) — founder of social anthropology
- George McGovern (visiting lecturer, 1990) — Democratic nominee for U.S. president (1972), senator from South Dakota (1963–81); taught on US foreign policy
- John V. Murra (1968–82) — professor of anthropology, with a focus on the Inca Empire
- Alan Nussbaum (professor of Linguistics, 1997–) — Indo-European linguist and classical philologist
- Meredith Small (professor, 1998–) — anthropologist and primatologist, author of several books on child development, including Our Babies, Ourselves
- Adam T. Smith (professor, 2011–) — anthropologist researching the history and societies of the South Caucasus
- Richard Swedberg (professor of Sociology, 2002–) — Swedish economic sociologist
- Mark P. Talbert — senior lecturer of hotel management, and subject of a viral YouTube video publicly criticizing an unknown student who was yawning loudly in one of his classes
- Sidney Tarrow (Maxwell Upson Professor of Government and Sociology) — researcher of comparative politics, social movements, and political sociology
- James D. Thompson (professor) — sociologist
- Bassam Tibi (A. D. White Professor-at-Large, 2004–) — political scientist of Islamic countries
- James E. Turner (professor emeritus of African and African American Politics and Social Policy — Africana studies; director of Africana Studies and Research Center, 1969–1986, 1996–2001
- Barbara Wertheimer (associate professor, 1977–1983) — co-founder and director of the Institute for Women and Work at the Industrial and Labor Relations School

=== Economics ===
- Francine D. Blau (Frances Perkins Professor of Industrial and Labor Relations and Labor Economics since 1995) — received her B.S. in industrial and labor relations in 1966 from Cornell
- Kaushik Basu (Carl Marks Professor of Economics) — Indian economist; chief economist of the World Bank; fellow of the Econometric Society
- Marco Battaglini (Edward H. Meyer Professor of Economics) — fellow of the Econometric Society
- Lawrence Blume (Goldwin Smith Professor of Economics) — fellow of the Econometric Society
- Morris Copeland (professor of Economics) — president of the American Economic Association
- David Easley (professor of Economics) — fellow of the Econometric Society and recipient of the Frederick W. Lanchester Prize (2011)
- George M. von Furstenberg (assistant professor of Economics) — economist best known for monetary policy, free trade policy and international finance
- George H. Hildebrand (Maxwell M. Upson Professor of Economics and Industrial and Labor Relations, 1960–69, 1971–80) — president of the Industrial Relations Research Association (1971)
- Charles Henry Hull (1864–1936) (professor of American History) — economist and historian. Edited The Economic Writings of Sir William Petty (1899)
- Louis Hyman Economic historian
- Jeremiah Jenks (professor of Economics, 1891–1912) — president of the American Economic Association (1906).
- John D. Kasarda — earned a bachelor of science degree in applied economics from Cornell in 1967 and masters of business administration degree in Organizational Theory from Cornell in 1968; developer of the aerotropolis concept, which defines the role of airports and aviation-driven economic development in shaping 21st-century urban growth and form; directs the Frank Hawkins Kenan Institute of Private Enterprise at the University of North Carolina at Chapel Hill Kenan-Flagler Business School
- James Laurence Laughlin (professor, 1890–92) — founded the Federal Reserve System
- John Williams Mellor (professor of Agricultural Economics, Economics, and Asian Studies; Director of the Comparative Economics Program and the Center for International Studies)
- Emmett J. Rice (professor, 1954–60) — former governor of the Federal Reserve System
- Thomas Sowell (professor, 1965–1969) — economist; National Humanities Medal (2002)
- Holbrook Working (professor) — economic theorist in the financial field
- Brian Wansink (professor and John S. Dyson Endowed Chair in the Applied Economics and Management Department) — famously discredited food scientist who was discovered to have repeatedly falsified scientific journal articles
- Allyn Young (professor, 1913–1920) — president of the American Economic Association

=== Psychology ===
- Samuel B. Bacharach (McKelvey-Grant Professor Emeritus) — director of the Smithers Institute
- Daryl Bem (professor of Psychology) — social psychologist, creator of self-perception theory
- Sandra Bem (professor) — psychologist; created the Bem Sex-Role Inventory; studies gender roles
- Stephen J. Ceci (professor) — researcher of children's courtroom testimony
- Michael J. Freeman (visiting assistant professor) — behavior sciences
- Eleanor J. Gibson (professor of Psychology) — perception and developmental psychology; fellow of the American Academy of Arts and Sciences; member of the National Academy of Sciences; recipient of the National Medal of Science (1992)
- James J. Gibson (professor of Psychology) — perception, member of the National Academy of Sciences
- Thomas Gilovich (professor of Psychology) — researcher of decision making and behavioral economics
- Paulina Kernberg (professor of Psychiatry, 1978–2006) — child psychiatrist and authority on personality disorders
- Lee C. Lee (professor of Human Development) — researcher in developmental psychology and Asian-American identity and history
- Kurt Lewin (professor) — founder of modern social psychology
- James Maas (professor of Psychology, c. 1963–2011) — sleep studies; longtime teacher of Cornell's most popular class, Psychology 101
- Neal E. Miller — experimental psychologist, recipient of the National Medal of Science (1964)
- Ulrich Neisser (professor) — studied intelligence and memory
- Robert Morris Ogden (1877–1959) — Cornell University graduate, professor of Psychology, and Cornell's dean of Arts and Sciences, 1923–1945
- David A. Pizarro (professor of Psychology)
- Ritch Savin-Williams (professor) — sexual orientation researcher
- Robert Sternberg (professor of Human Development) — president of the American Psychological Association; professor of Psychology and provost at Oklahoma State University, dean of Arts and Sciences at Tufts University; IBM Professor of Psychology and Education at Yale University; known for triarchic theory of intelligence, triangular theory of love and three-process view; fellow of the Society of Experimental Psychologists, the American Academy of Arts and Sciences and the American Association for the Advancement of Science
- Edward B. Titchener (professor) — psychologist; inventor of structuralism

== See also ==
- List of Cornell University alumni
