= Proto-Indo-European desiderative =

There were several distinct types of Proto-Indo-European desiderative formations. Many daughter languages, such as Ancient Greek or Latin, converted the original desideratives into future formations. However, the original desiderative meaning is still preserved in Indo-Iranian.

== *(h₁)se-desiderative ==
=== Ordinary ===
This thematic suffix formed desiderative verbs, meaning "to want to do". Ringe reconstructs for this formation the ablaut paradigm *(é)-(h₁)s-eti ~ *(é)-(h₁)s-onti, which contains the accented full grade of the root. Ancient Greek future forms such as δείξω (deíxō)—the future form of δείκνυμι (deíknumi)—suggest that, in Proto-Indo-European, the desiderative suffix was applied to the bare root, not the verbs themselves. The Proto-Indo-European desiderative is the source for the future tense in a variety of daughter languages, with only Indo-Iranian retaining the original desiderative meaning. In Latin, certain third-conjugation verbs likely derive from original desideratives, such as vīsō ("to look at, see"), which probably reflects a Proto-Indo-European verb *wéydseti ("to want to see"), itself from the root *weyd- ("to see").

Despite the reconstruction of a laryngeal in the suffix, numerous verbs within Ancient Greek form their future paradigms purely via the addition of a thematic s-suffix, which may result from the deletion of the laryngeal between stops and the *-s-. The linguist Jaan Puhvel suggests that standard Greek sigmatic future forms may reflect the deletion of the laryngeal when placed between two nonsyllabic consonants. If this theory is accepted, then a term such as "ἄξουσι" ("áxousi") could still be explained from Proto-Indo-European *Heǵ-Hsonti. However, in Ancient Greek, verb stems ending in nasals or liquids generally create futures utilizing the suffix -έω (-éō), likely as a consequence of the e-coloring laryngeal *h₁ in the desiderative suffix. Future forms such as μενέω (menéō) may derive from earlier *menehō, itself from *ménh₁seti. According to Puhvel, the laryngeal likely remained present when placed subsequent to root-final *r, *l, *m, and *n, thereby allowing for the preservation of the laryngeal in hypothetical pre-forms such as *ménh₁seti. Further evidence for an original laryngeal perhaps appears in Celtic, where the Old Irish s-subjunctive has been derived from an *-(a)se- morpheme, which itself perhaps resulted from the vocalization of the laryngeal as *a.

=== Reduplicated ===
In Sanskrit, there exists a particular type of thematic desiderative class formed via í-reduplication and a sa-suffix. For instance, consider the desiderative term nínīṣati, which belongs to the root √nī-. However, roots marked by the vowel -u- typically formed desideratives utilizing u-reduplication, such as the term jughukṣati, which belongs to the root √guh-. Whereas the Sanskrit reduplicated desiderative was typically marked by a weak root vowel, certain roots with a final resonant produced lengthened grade desideratives. Puhvel suggests that these formations regularly reflect a Proto-Indo-European sequence of the shape *-RHs-, in which the resonant and the consonant *-s- were separated an intervening laryngeal. For instance, the Sanskrit desiderative cíkīrṣati can be construed as the expected outcome of Proto-Indo-European *kʷí-kʷr̥-(h₁)s-eti. Regardless, this specific type of desiderative may have existed at the Proto-Indo-European level, as it also possibly the source of certain Old Irish and Ancient Greek reduplicated futures. In Ancient Greek, there exist terms such as Homeric "δεδέξομαι" ("dedéxomai"), a future form of δέχομαι ("dékhomai"). Such reduplicated futures also appear in Attic Greek—Aristophanes, a 5th-century BCE Athenian playwright, utilizes the reduplicated future form "κεκλαύσεται" ("keklaúsetai"). In Old Irish, numerous verbs showcase s-futures with reduplication, such as guidid—the future form of which was gigsea. However, the linguist Frederik Kortlandt argues that the endings of the Old Irish reduplicated s-future are indicative an originally athematic paradigm, in contrast to the thematic nature of the Sanskrit reduplicated desiderative.

== *sye-desiderative ==
Ringe reconstructs this paradigm as *(∅)-sy-éti ~ *(∅)-sy-ónti, though Lundquist and Yates instead reconstruct *h₁s-ye-ti. According to Jasanoff, there is evidence in Sanskrit for a laryngeal within the suffix, namely the -i- present in the future forms of roots ending with a resonant. For instance, the Sanskrit root kṛ- ("to do, make") forms a future of the shape kariṣyáti, where the -i- perhaps reflects an earlier *h₁ laryngeal. However, Sanskrit roots that do not end in a resonant also generally do not form futures using the suffix -iṣyáti, such as the root vac- ("to speak, say"), which produces a future of the shape vakṣyáti. This verbal formation is reflected in the Sanskrit future-forming suffix -syáti and possibly also the Lithuanian future paradigm. Given the restriction to one specific area of the Indo-European world, it may have been a dialectal regionalism within the proto-language. However, the *sye-suffix is perhaps attested in Gaulish future forms such as pissiumi ("I shall see").

== *s-presents ==
=== Athematic ===
There is evidence of a class of athematic s-presents in Hittite that showcases *CéC-ti ~ CØC-énti ablaut, as reflected in terms such as kane/iššzi ("to recognize"), which—according to Kloekhorst—derives from *ǵnéh₃-s-ti ~ *ǵnh₃-s-énti. Jasanoff instead opts to reconstruct a type of Narten s-present characterized by *ḗ ~ *é ablaut, citing the -i- in Lithuanian dual and plural sigmatic verbs such as dúosime ("to give"), Latin optative forms such as faxim, and certain Old Irish unreduplicated s-aorists as evidence. Ultimately, Jasanoff proposes that the imperfect of this Narten s-present class was the source of the later sigmatic aorist formations in the various daughter languages. Kloekhorst, however, suggests none of the Hittite s-verbs display any evidence for acrostatic Narten ablaut, and instead, where the original ablaut pattern is recoverable, it always shows *é ~ Ø alteration in mi-verbs and *ó ~ Ø gradation in ḫi-verbs. Moreover, Kloekhorst notes the existence of alternative explanations for all of the aforementioned evidence from the non-Anatolian branches adduced in support of Jasanoff's theory.

According to de Vaan, it is perhaps possible that the Latin term ignōrō is an s-present that may continue the same pre-form as Hittite kane/iššzi. The linguist Reiner Lipp suggests that the athematic s-present class gave rise to the sigmatic desiderative of Ancient Greek, though—during the transition towards Greek—the paradigm underwent thematicization. Another Hittite s-present form, tákšzi ("to devise, endeavor"), which possibly derives from *téḱ-s-ti, may parallel the Latin s-present texō ("to weave"). These forms are collectively assigned to an earlier athematic s-desiderative by the LIV, which argues that the Hittite term underwent a semantic shift from "to desire to weave" to simply "to undertake, strive." However, according to the linguist H. Craig Melchert, neither the Latin nor Hittite forms reveal any evidence for original desiderative semantics.

Jasanoff contends that the original Hittite athematic s-present class may have simultaneously expressed desiderative, inchoative, and iterative semantics, arguing that these three verbal senses are generally similar and that it is common for desideratives to evolve into iterative or inchoative verbs. In particular, Jasanoff suggests that Hittite kane/iššzi probably reflects an earlier inchoative meaning such as "to come into awareness," which was perhaps later assumed by the later *sḱé-present *ǵn̥h₃sḱéti. However, Jasanoff also argues that the root *h₂eys- ("to search"), which—according to Jasanoff—had an inherently desiderative meaning, also reveals evidence of specifically desiderative verbal formation. Namely, according to Jasanoff, the full-grade vocalism of Old Armenian haycʻem ("to ask, supplicate") and the lengthened-grade of Old Lithuanian ieszku ("to seek")—both of which are cognates with the zero-grade verb *h₂isḱéti—suggests analogical remodeling under the influence of a sigmatic desiderative from the same root. Kloekhorst has criticized Jasanoff proposal of a simultaneously iterative, inchoative, and desiderative meaning, denigrating the ideas as premised exclusively upon "circumstantial" evidence.

=== Thematic ===
Ringe additionally reconstructs a type of thematic s-present, for which he supplies the ablaut paradigm *(é)-s-eti ~ *(é)-s-onti. There are a scant number of terms in the Indo-European languages that attest to this formation, though Fortson cites examples such as ἀέξω ("aéxō"). Kölligan and Jasanoff, however, explain this form as derived from an original sigmatic desiderative. Kölligan provides numerous other examples of supposed lexicalized desideratives, such as Old High German blāsan, which he derives from a PIE form of the shape *bʰleh₁(s)-, though Kroonen alternatively ascribes the term to an original sigmatic aorist. In certain cases, the lexicalized desiderative may have provided the basis of an entirely new root. For instance, the root *ḱlews- ("to hear") perhaps emerged via the reanalysis of the desiderative *ḱléwseti ("to listen"), itself from the unextended root *ḱlew- ("to hear").

== sā-nominals ==
The linguist Alan Nussbaum argues for a particular type of morphological process wherein s-desiderative presents produced deverbal nouns. For instance, the Old Latin s-present verb capsō ("will take") coexists with the nouns capsa ("box") and capsus ("enclosure"). Nussbaum argues that this process remained productive in other Indo-European languages, citing the Sanskrit reduplicated desiderative jigīṣati (“to desire victory”), whence the noun jigīṣā́ (“desire for victory”). These nouns formed the basis for later denominative verbs, such as axō ("to name"), which ultimately derives from an s-enlargement of the root *h₁eǵ- (“to say”) that is also continued by Tocharian B ākṣäṃ (“will announce”).

== See also ==
- Proto-Indo-European language
- Proto-Indo-European verbs
