= Zygmunt Haas =

American professor emeritus of electrical and computer engineering

Zygmunt J. Haas
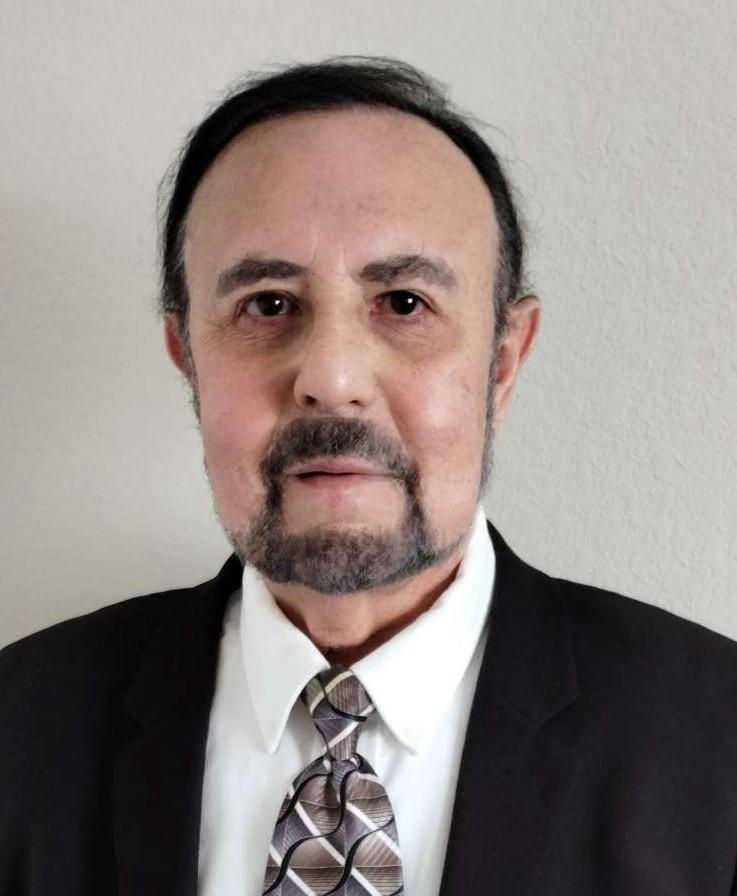
- Born: October 1, 1956 (age 70)
- Education: Stanford University
- Awards: Fellow of the IEEE, Fellow the ACM, Fellow of the European Alliance for Innovation (EAI), Fellow of the International AIIA, Fellow of the AAIA, Fellow of the Institute of Engineering and Technology (IET), 2016 IEEE ComSoc AHSN Recognition Award, 2012 IEEE ComSoc WTC Recognition Award
- Scientific career
- Fields: Information Assurance, Network Security, Wireless Networks, Zone Routing Protocol (ZRP), Internet of Things, Communication Systems, Communication protocol, Sensor Networks, Ad Hoc Networks
- Workplaces: Cornell University, University of Texas at Dallas
- Doctoral advisor: David Cheriton (Stanford University)
- Website: https://people.ece.cornell.edu/haas/wnl/

Zygmunt J. Haas is a Professor and Distinguished Chair in Computer Science at the University of Texas at Dallas (UTD) and a Professor Emeritus at the School of Electrical and Computer Engineering at Cornell University. His current research interests include Ad Hoc Networks, Wireless Networks, Sensor Networks, Mobile Systems, Wireless Communications, Communication Protocols, Evaluation of Communication Protocols, Network Security, Information Assurance, Reconfigurable Intelligent Surfaces, Machine Learning, Energy and Power Systems.

Dr. Haas is an author/co-author of 128 journal papers, 171 conference papers, and 26 book chapters. He is a named inventor/co-inventor on 24 U.S. and international patents.

Throughout his professional career, Prof. Haas has advised 46 graduated Ph.D. students and 65 post-docs and visiting researchers at Cornell University and at the University of Texas at Dallas.

Dr. Haas supported a number of legal litigation cases, serving as an expert witness, in a number of well-known cases, in front of U.S. International Trade Commission (ITC), the Patent Trial and Appeal Board (PTAB), and district courts.

== Education ==
Haas received his B.Sc. degree in electrical engineering in 1979, his M.Sc. degree in electrical engineering in 1985, and his PhD from Stanford University in 1988. His Ph.D. thesis was entitled “Packet Switching in Future Fiber-Optic Wide-Area Networks,” May 1988.

== Career ==
After graduating from Stanford University in 1988, Haas joined AT&T Bell Labs in the Network Research Department in Holmdel, NJ. There he pursued research on wireless communications, mobility management, communication protocols, optical networks, and optical switching. From September 1994 to July 1995, Haas worked for the AT&T Wireless Center of Excellence, in Whippany, NJ, where he investigated various aspects of wireless and mobile networking, concentrating on TCP/IP networks. In August 1995, he joined the faculty of the School of Electrical and Computer Engineering at Cornell University, where he was promoted to Full Tenured Professor. In 2010-2011, he served as a Program Director in the Engineering Directorate, Division of Electrical, Communications and Cyber Systems (ENG/ECCS) of the National Science Foundation. Since August 2013, he has been with the Computer Science Department at the University of Texas at Dallas, where he is a Professor and Distinguished Chair.

Haas is an active author in the fields of networking, wireless networks, wireless communications, and power systems. He has organized several workshops, delivered numerous tutorials at major IEEE and ACM conferences, and has served as editor of numerous journals and magazines, including the IEEE Transactions on Networking, the IEEE Transactions on Wireless Communications, the IEEE Communications Magazine, the Springer Wireless Networks journal, the Elsevier Ad Hoc Networks journal, the Journal of High Speed Networks, and the Wiley Wireless Communications and Mobile Computing journal. He has been a guest editor of IEEE JSAC issues on "Gigabit Networks," "Mobile Computing Networks," and "Ad-Hoc Networks." In 2007, Haas was elevated to IEEE Fellow “for contributions to wireless and mobile ad-hoc networks” and in 2021 he was awarded the title of ACM Fellow for “outstanding technical and professional achievements in the field of information technology”.

He is also an IET Fellow, a Fellow of the European Alliance for Innovation (EAI) , a Fellow of the International Artificial Intelligence Industry Alliance (AIIA), and a Fellow of the Asia-Pacific Artificial Intelligence Association (AAIA). He has served in the past as a Chair of the IEEE Technical Committee on Technical Committee on Personal Communications (TCPC), now known as the IEEE Technical Committee on Wireless Communications.

== Research ==
Haas has published over 300 technical publications and 24 patents and participated in the editing of 26 books or book chapters.

- Reconfigurable Intelligent Surface (RIS) Technologies
- Multihop Routing for Wireless Ad Hoc Networks (e.g., the Zone Routing Protocol (ZRP))
- Secure Routing and Communications
- Machine Learning in Communication and Network Systems
- Multipath Technologies
- Energy Systems and Energy-Efficient Communications
- Transportation Systems
- Backscattered Communication
- Sensor Networks and Sensor Coverage
- Mobility Management and Mobility Modeling
- Protocols for Mobile Environments
- Medium Access Protocols
- Network Protocols
- Scalability
- Delay Tolerant Networks
- Simulation Technologies
- Cellular Networks
- Optical Networks, Optical Switching, Optical Communications

=== Patents ===
Haas is a named inventor/co-inventor on 24 U.S. and international granted patents.

== Selected honors and awards ==
- Fellow of the Association for Computing Machinery, (ACM) 2021, for “outstanding technical and professional achievements in the field of information technology”.
- Fellow of the Institute of Electrical and Electronics Engineers (IEEE), January 2007, “for contribution to wireless and mobile ad hoc networks”.
- Fellow of the European Alliance for Innovation (EAI), May 2019.
- Fellow of the Institute of Engineering and Technology (IET), March 2019.
- Fellow of the Asia-Pacific Artificial Intelligence Association (AAIA), June 2021.
- 2016 IEEE ComSoc AHSN Recognition Award (“for outstanding contributions to securing ad hoc and sensor networks") presented at IEEE Globecom 2016, December 5, 2016, Washington DC.
- 2012 IEEE ComSoc WTC Recognition Award (the award recognizes individuals for "outstanding technical contributions in the field and for his service to the scientific and engineering communities") presented at IEEE Globecom 2012, December 5, 2012, Anaheim, CA.
- IEEE Distinguished Lecturer Tour, Scandinavian Countries, May 25 – June 5, 2009.
