= Rebecca J. Nelson =

American biologist and professor

Rebecca J. Nelson (born 1961) is an American biologist and a professor at Cornell University and a MacArthur Foundation Fellow.

Her work focuses on natural genetic diversity for disease resistance in maize.

== Biography ==
Nelson's parents were researchers at the National Institutes of Health. Rebecca holds a BA degree from Swarthmore College, 1982 and a Ph.D. in Zoology from the University of Washington, 1988. She is married to public radio journalist Jonathan Miller and has two children, William and Benjamin.

Nelson began her career at the International Rice Research Institute in the Philippines between 1988 and 1996. From 1996 to 2001, Nelson led the late blight program at the International Potato Center in Lima, Peru starting in 1996. In 1998, Rebecca was named a MacArthur Foundation Fellow for her work in combating rice diseases and potato blight.

In 2001, Nelson became Professor of Plant Pathology & Plant-Microbe-Biology, Plant Breeding & Genetics and International Agriculture & Rural Development at Cornell University. Rebecca teaches an undergraduate course on "Perspectives in International Agriculture and Rural Development" and contributes to other courses in international agriculture and plant pathology. Her research laboratory, based at Cornell University, collaborates with maize geneticists and breeders at Cornell, in Kenya and elsewhere. Ongoing research includes analyzing the genetic architecture of quantitative disease resistance and dissecting quantitative trait loci to identify mechanisms and genes that impair pathogen development, with a particular interest in multiple disease resistance and mycotoxin resistance. She recently added a new subject to her research, focusing on CBE, or circular bionutrient economies in management.

In 2021, Nelson cofounded the multiuse community space The Soil Factory in Ithaca, NY with Johannes Lehmann and John Guant.

== Selected publications ==
- "Relationship between Phylogeny and Pathotype for the Bacterial Blight Pathogen of Rice," Nelson, Rebecca J.; Baraoidan, Marietta R.; Cruz, Casiana M. Vera; Yap, Immanuel V.; Leach, Jan E. Applied and Environmental Microbiology. 60, no. 9, (September 1994): 3275–3283.
- "The Role of Genomics Research in Improvement of 'Orphan' Crops," by Rebecca J. Nelson, Rosamond L. Naylor, and Molly M. Jahn. Crop Science, Vol. 44, November - December 2004: 1901–1904.
- Wisser, R.J., Balint-Kurti, P.J., and R.J. Nelson. 2005. The genetic architecture of disease resistance in maize: a synthesis of published studies. Phytopathology 96(2): 120–129.
- Wisser, R.J., Qi, S., Kresovich, S., and R.J. Nelson. 2005. Identification and characterization of regions of the rice genome associated with broad-spectrum, quantitative disease resistance. Genetics 169: 2277–2293.
- Andrade-Piedra, J., R. Hijmans, G. Forbes, W.E. Fry and R.J. Nelson. 2005. Simulation of potato late blight in the Andes. 1: Modification and parameterization of the LATEBLIGHT model. Phytopathology 95 (10): 1191–1199.
- Garry, G., A. Salas, G. Forbes, W. Perez, M. Santa Cruz, and R.J. Nelson. 2005. Host specialization not detected in isolates of Phytophthora infestans attacking wild and cultivated potatoes in Peru. European J. Plant Pathology 54: 740–748.
- Ortiz, O., Garrett, K. A., Heath, J. J., Orrego, R., and Nelson, R. J. 2004. Management of potato late blight in the Peruvian highlands: Evaluating the benefits of Farmer Field Schools and Farmer Participatory Research. Plant Disease 88: 15–44.
- Naylor, R.L., W. P. Falcon, R.M. Goodman, M.M. Jahn, T. Sengooba, H. Tefera, and R.J. Nelson. 2004. Biotechnology in the Developing World: A Case for Increased Investments in Orphan Crops. Food Policy 29(1): 15–44.
- R.J. Nelson, R.L. Naylor, M.M. Jahn. 2004. The role of genomics research in improvement of "orphan" crops. Crop Science 44: 1901–1904.
- Trognitz, F.C., P.M. Manosalva, D.O. Niño-Liu, Ma. del R. Herrera, M. Ghislain, B.R. Trognitz and R.J. Nelson. 2002. Plant defense genes associated with quantitative resistance to potato late blight in Solanum phureja x S. tuberosum hybrids. Mol. Plant-Microbe Interactions 15 (6): 587–597.
- Thiele, G., R. Nelson, O. Ortiz, and S. Sherwood. 2001. Participatory research and training: ten lesson from the Farmer Field Schools (FFS) in the Andes. Currents 27: 4–11.
- Nelson, R.J., Orrego, R., Ortiz, O., Mundt, M., Fredrix, M. and Vien, N.V. 2001. Working with resource-poor farmers to manage plant diseases. Plant Disease 85: 684–695.
- Perez, W.G., J.S. Gamboa, Y.V. Falcon, M. Coca, R.M. Raymundo and R.J. Nelson. 2001. Genetic structure of Peruvian populations of Phytophthora infestans. Phytopathology 91: 956–965.
- Garrett, K.A., R.J. Nelson, C.C. Mundt, G. Chacon, R.E. Jaramillo, and G.A. Forbes. 2001. The effects of host diversity and other management components on epidemics of late blight in the humid highland tropics. Phytopathology 91: 993–1000.
- Shanti, M.L., M.L.C. George, C.M. Vera Cruz, M.A. Bernardo, R.J. Nelson, H. Leung, J.N. Reddy and R. Sridhar. 2001. Identification of resistance genes effective against rice bacterial blight pathogen in Eastern India. Plant Disease 85: 506–512.
- Vera Cruz, C.M., J. Bai, I. Ona, H. Leung, R.J. Nelson, T.W. Mew and J.E. Leach. 2000. Predicting durability of a disease resistance gene based on an assessment of the fitness loss and epidemiological consequences of an avirulence gene mutation. Proc. Natl. Acad. Sci. USA. 97(25): 13500–13505.
- Kumar, J., R.J. Nelson, and R. S. Zeigler. 1999. Population structure and dynamics of Magnaporthe grisea in the India Himalayas. Genetics 152: 971–984.
- Finckh, M. and R.J. Nelson. 1999. Phylogenetic and pathotypic analysis of bacterial blight race 3. European Journal of Plant Pathology 105 (8): 743–751.
- Chen, D., M. dela Vina, T. Inukai, D.J. Mackill, P.C. Ronald and R.J. Nelson. 1999. Molecular mapping of the blast resistance genes, Pi44(t), derived from a durably resistant rice cultivar. Theoretical and Applied Genetics 98: 1046–1053.
- "Cash From Chicago Aids Fight for Spuds," by Laurie Goering. Chicago Tribune, June 17, 1998, page 4.
- "Building a Better Potato: American Scientist Rebecca Nelson Has Been Leading the Charge to Use Genetically modified crops to Fight Famine in Peru. But Not Everyone Thinks It's God's Work," by Jonathan Kandell. Los Angeles Times Magazine, August 11, 2002, section I.18.
- "Potato Warrior: Molecular biologist Rebecca Nelson '82 is trying to defeat 'the worst crop disease in the world.'"

== Sources ==
- Swarthmore College Bulletin September 1998.
- Cornell University staff page.
