= Stephen Lee (chemist) =

American chemist (born 1955)

- 李中漢
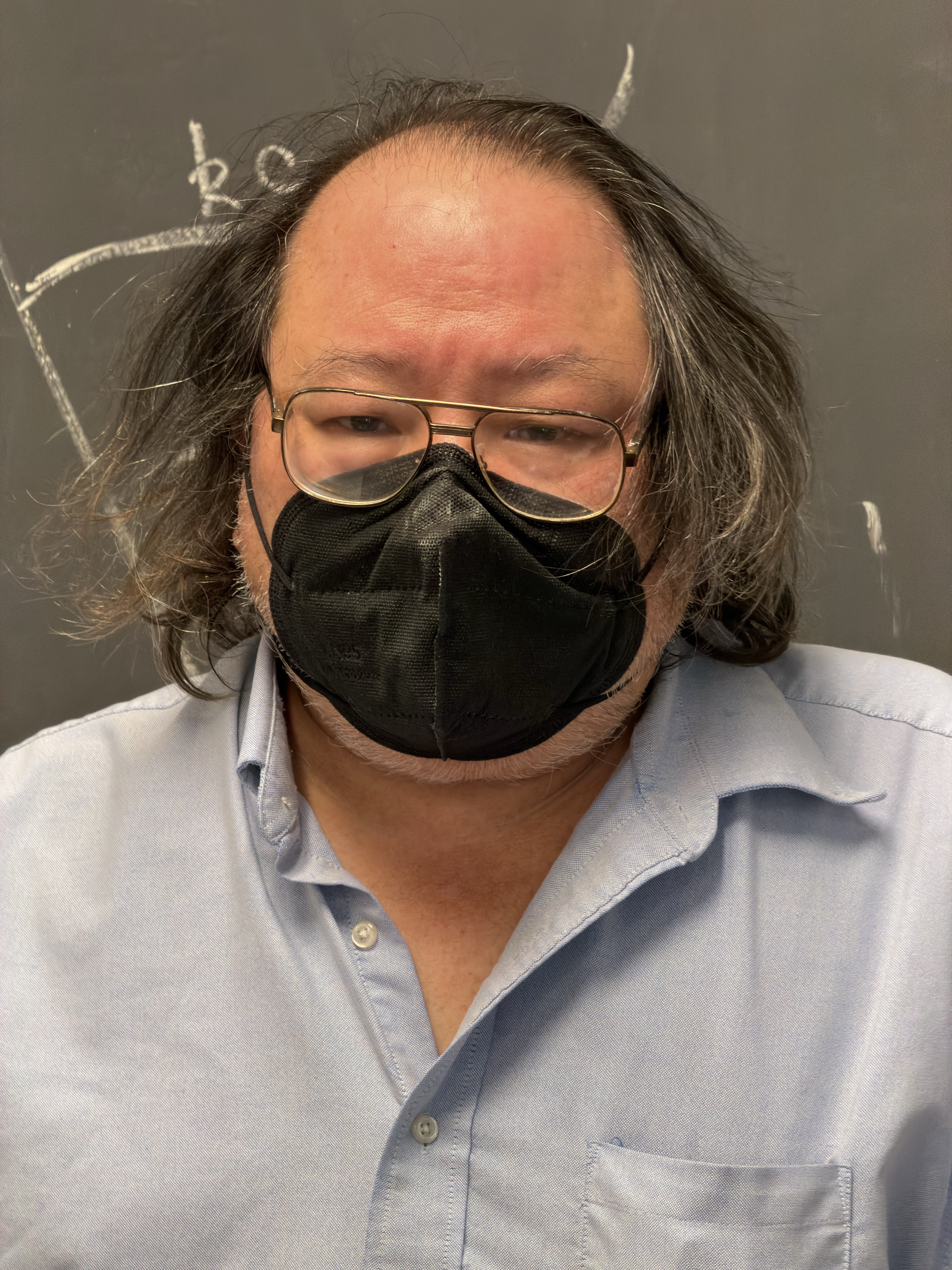
- Born: 25 October 1955 (age 70); New York, New York, US
- Education: Yale University; University of Chicago
- Known for: Solid State Chemistry; Porous Solids with Stronger Bonds; Chemical Pressure and Charge Density Waves in Rare Earth Polytellurides
- Awards: MacArthur Award (1994); Alfred P. Sloan Foundation recognition
- Scientific career
- Fields: Physics, Chemistry
- Workplaces: Cornell University; University of Michigan

Stephen Lee (Chinese: 李中漢; pinyin: Lǐ Zhōnghàn; born 25 October 1955) is an American chemist. He is the son of Tsung-Dao Lee, the winner of the 1957 Nobel Prize in Physics. He is currently a professor at Cornell University.

== Education ==
Lee attended the International School of Geneva, Switzerland and Yale University, from which he graduated with a BA in 1978. He later received his PhD from the University of Chicago in 1985.

== Career ==
In 1993, Lee received the MacArthur Award for his work in the field of physics and chemistry. In addition, he has received an award from the Alfred P. Sloan Foundation for his continued research.

In 1999, Lee joined Cornell University as a professor of solid state chemistry in the chemistry and chemical biology department from the University of Michigan, where he had been associate professor of chemistry since 1993.

He currently continues his teaching career at Cornell, where he instructs students in (honors) general chemistry and introduction to chemistry courses. During the past 10 years, Lee has devoted his summer to helping incoming freshmen learn basic chemistry to prepare them for the academic year. This has been considered part of Lee's philanthropic work, as he teaches these summer courses probono.

His current research involves developing stronger porous solids in which all the host porous bonds are covalent in character. Lee is also researching ways to introduce cross-linkable guests (such as di-isocyanides or disilyltriflates) which will react with nucleophilic groups, leading to a fully covalent organic porous solid. He also hopes to develop a long range order in intermetallic phases: Examine noble metal alloys where unit cell dimensions range from just a few, to almost 104 Å.

== Personal life ==
Stephen Lee was born to 1957 Nobel Prize winner in Physics Tsung-Dao Lee and Hui-Chun Jeannette Chin (Chinese: 秦惠莙; pinyin: Qín Huìjūn), who died in 1996. Lee has one brother, James Lee (Chinese: 李中清; pinyin: Lǐ Zhōngqīng; born 1952), who is the dean of the School of Humanities and Social Science at the Hong Kong University of Science and Technology and chair professor of the Division of Social Science at the same university.
