= Alan Nussbaum =

American linguist (born 1947)

- Born: 17 December 1947 (age 78); New York City, United States
- Occupations: linguist, Indo-Europeanist

Alan Jeffrey "Jerry" Nussbaum (born December 17, 1947) is an American linguist of the Indo-European languages and a classical philologist, studying the language of the Homeric epics and modern and Proto-Indo-European nominals. He has specialized in nominals' derivational semantics and morphology (including that of the "Caland system"). He is a professor of Indo-European linguistics, and the Greek and Latin languages at Cornell University.

Nussbaum, of Galician Jewish background, was born in New York City and raised in Passaic, New Jersey. He received a bachelor's degree in classics (1969) from Washington Square College of New York University, a Diploma in Comparative Philology (1974) from the University of Oxford, and a Ph.D. in linguistics (1976) from Harvard University. After teaching as an instructor, assistant professor, and associate professor at Yale University (1975–85), he moved to Cornell as an associate professor (1985–97) and then as full professor since 1997 of classics and linguistics.

Nussbaum was married to philosopher Martha Nussbaum, professor of law and ethics at the University of Chicago, from 1969 to 1987.

== See also ==
- List of Cornell University faculty

== Bibliography ==
- Nussbaum, A. (1986). Head and Horn in Indo-European. Berlin-New York: Walter de Gruyter.
- Nussbaum, A. (1998). Two Studies in Greek and Homeric Linguistics.' Göttingen: Vandenhoeck & Rupprecht.
- Nussbaum, A., ed. (2007). Verba Docenti. Studies in historical and Indo-European linguistics presented to Jay H. Jasanoff by students, colleagues, and friends. Ann Arbor and New York: Beech Stave Press.
- Cooper, Adam I., ed. (2012). Multi Nominis Grammaticus: Studies in Classical and Indo-European Linguistics in Honor of Alan J. Nussbaum on the Occasion of his Sixty-fifth Birthday Ann Arbor: Beech Stave Press.
