= Madelon Lubin Finkel =

Madelon Lubin Finkel is a retired Professor of Population Health Sciences and Inaugural Director Office of Global Health Education (2004-2021) at Weill Cornell Medical College in New York City. She holds a doctorate in epidemiology and health services research from the Graduate School of Arts and Sciences of New York University. Finkel was a visiting professor at the School of Public Health, University of Sydney (Australia) in 2004, and at Chulalongkorn University Faculty of Medicine in Bangkok Thailand in 2016. In 2008, she was named a Fulbright Senior Specialist.

Finkel's work on second surgical opinion programs led to the widespread adoption and implementation of the second opinion benefit required by almost all insurance companies, corporations, and unions. Finkel, in consultation with the New York City Board of Education, conducted many studies in the area of teenage pregnancy and childbearing. Her work led to the revision of the sexual education curriculum, which was implemented by the Board of Education in the early 1980s. Her work in the area of hormone replacement therapy focused on alternatives for women experiencing menopause. She is involved in a cervical cancer screening project in rural India, and is studying the health impact of hydraulic fracturing. Finkel's publications on unconventional gas extraction have been cited widely in the lay and professional press. Her article with Adam Law, "The Rush to Drill for Natural Gas: A Public Health Cautionary Tale", calls for epidemiologic studies to assess the potential for harm to human health. Finkel and Law wrote the seminal piece on the potential for harm to human health from unconventional gas development. Since that publication, she has written numerous pieces in the lay and professional press on the health impact of hydraulic fracturing.

Finkel has published widely on public health topics. Her ninth book, Understanding the Mammography Controversy: Science, Politics, and Breast Cancer Screening, focused on breast cancer screening. It was recommended by the reviewer for Lancet. Her 10th book, Truth, Lies, and Public Health: How We Are Affected when Science and Politics Collide, discusses in a series of essays the potentially toxic interaction of politics and science. She served as editor of Public Health in the 21st Century, published in 2010. In 2015, she published an in-depth analysis of the impact of hydraulic fracturing on the environment and human health (The Human and Environmental Impact of Fracking: How Fracturing Shale for Gas Affects Us and Our World. Prager Press). In 2017, she edited Cancer Screening in the Developing World: Case Studies and Strategies from the Field (University Press of New England), which presents innovative strategies in cancer screening in a diverse array of developing countries. This book was awarded the bronze medal by the Independent Publisher Book Awards in 2019. Building on her expertise in the potential for harm to health and the environment from fossil fuel extraction, her book, Pipeline Politics: The Evidence Being Ignored and What’s at Stake (Praeger Press, 2017) presents a fascinating history of the geo-politics of energy and pipeline wars. Finkel's latest book, Breast Cancer Facts, Myths, and Controversies: Understanding Current Screenings and Treatments (Praeger Press 2021), provides an easy-to-understand presentation about breast cancer screening and treatment as well as ways of coping with the disease. The text explains the history of breast cancer detection, treatment, and prevention and discusses the benefits and side effects of targeted therapies.

In 2019, Finkel established, The Madelon Global Health Foundation, a non-profit organization whose purpose is to focus on women's health issues in an effort to help better the lives of women living in low- and middle-income countries. A secondary purpose is to support organizations and programs that are dedicated to addressing climate change/global warming, specifically as related to its impact on human health.

Finkel was named the Bruce Laine Ballard, MD Award for Excellence in Mentorship in 2012, and was awarded the Albert Nelson Marquis Lifetime Achievement Award in 2018. This is an honor reserved for individuals who have demonstrated leadership, excellence and longevity within their respective industries and professions. Finkel has received seven Excellence in Teaching awards from Weill Cornell in recognition of her teaching at the Medical School. In 2022, she received a Lifetime Achievement in Education Award from Weill Cornell.

Finkel serves as secretary of the board of Physicians, Scientists, and Engineers for Healthy Energy (PSE), a non-profit organization whose focus is to examine the empirical bases and assumptions of unconventional energy production as well as the energy transition from fossil fuels to renewable energies. She also serves as a board member (formerly Secretary of the Board) of the Christian Medical College Vellore Foundation, USA.

== Personal life ==
Born Madelon Lubin and is the daughter of Ralph and Lorraine Lubin. She married David J. Finkel in 1973 and divorced 21 years later. She married Arnold N. Lefkowitz in 1999. She has one daughter, Rebecca Finkel, and three step-daughters, including Eva Lefkowitz and Ryan Lefkowitz, Esq., and two grandchildren.
