= David A. Hammer =

David A. Hammer (Professor of Nuclear Energy Engineering)

David A. Hammer is the J. Carlton Ward, Jr. Professor of Nuclear Energy Engineering, in the Cornell University College of Engineering. In 2004, Hammer received the Institute of Electrical and Electronics Engineers Plasma Science and Applications Committee Award, as well as the Distinguished Career Award from Fusion Power Associates in 2018.

Hammer has published 210 articles published in referred journals and 100 papers published in conference proceedings.

== Education ==
Hammer was born in the Bronx, New York and moved to Los Angeles, California at the age of two. Hammer received a Bachelor's degree in Physics from California Institute of Technology in 1964 and went on to earn his PhD in Applied Physics from Cornell University in 1969.

== Career ==
Hammer is the J. Carlton Ward, Jr., Professor of Nuclear Energy Engineering and Professor of Electrical and Computer Engineering at Cornell University. He joined the faculty at Cornell in 1977. Before joining Cornell, Hammer worked at the Naval Research Laboratory from 1969-1976 as a research physicist and later supervisory research physicist in the Plasma Physics Division. Hammer taught at the University of Maryland from 1973 and 1976 and at UCLA in 1977. During sabbaticals, he acted as a Visiting Senior Fellow at Imperial College, London, in 1998 at Applied Materials, Inc., and in 2011 at the Paris Observatory, France.

In 1990, Hammer co-founded the company Applied Pulse Power, Inc. based on his research of pulsed power technology. The company was awarded five small business innovation research phase 2 grants and was sold in 2020.

Hammer has held leadership roles in the High Energy Density Laboratory Plasma (HEDLP) program. In 2003, Hammer was a participant of the first NAS/NRC review of HDLP and a co-author of the final report of that review, Frontiers of High Energy Density Physics: The X-games of Contemporary Science. In 2006, he was the Founding Chair of the Steering Committee of the HEDSA (the High Energy Density Science Association). Hammer was the Co-Lead of the HEDLP Research Needs Workshop in 2009 (co-sponsored by DOE/OFES and NNSA) and the principal technical author of the workshop report. The DOE Office of Fusion Energy Sciences – NNSA Joint program on HEDLP utilizes the Table of Contents of the workshop report as topics for Funding Opportunity Announcements. Hammer also served as a member of the review committee sponsored by NNSA of the national inertial confinement fusion program. From 1979 to 2010, Hammer participated as a member of the Pulsed Power Review Committee for Sandia National Laboratories.

Hammer has contributed to the American Physical Society, Division of Plasma Physics (APS-DPP) by serving as: Vice-Chair, Chair-elect, Chair, and past chair over a four-year period. He has also been a member of the APS Council for four years, member of the APS Executive Board for two years, Chair of an Award Committee for APS, and member of the Nominations Committee for APS. In addition to his contributions to APS, Hammer has served as a member of an Awards Committee for IEEE from 2019-2022.

== Research ==
Hammer's research is focused on pulsed-power-driven high energy density plasmas, plasma radiation sources, controlled fusion, and high-resolution x-ray imaging. Hammer's research group currently performs experiments ranging from single to multiple wire arrays. These experiments address questions related to inertial confinement fusion.

=== Pulsed-power machines and intense electron beam propagation ===
Hammer assisted in building the first pulsed-power machine in 1967. He, along with a visiting engineer (George Herbert) and a visiting scientist (Phillip Champney) from the AWRE (Atomic Weapons Research Laboratory, Aldermaston, UK), respectively carried out the first intense (200 kA, 60 ns pulsed) electron beam propagation experiments in various low-pressure gases (1968). Hammer continued with his research utilizing pulse-powered machines at the Naval Research Laboratory (NRL) where he initiated the intense electron beam propagation experiments (100 kA beams) starting in 1971. He research then focused on understanding electron beam propagation in plasmas. Additionally, Hammer joined other scientists in developing the early microwave generation experiments with intense beams.

=== Intense ion beam diodes ===
As a faculty member at Cornell University starting, Hammer and his lab began experiments on the development of practical intense ion beam diodes on pulsed power machines, with a focus on magnetically insulated diodes. Hammer and his lab designed, built, and tested a magnetically insulated ion diode that was used for repetitive pulse studies at Cornell and was also used for materials surface modification by a spin-off company from Sandia National Laboratories.

=== Radiography applications ===
In 1989, Hammer started the X-pinch research and development work at Cornell University together with a post-doctoral researcher (Niansheng Qi) and a graduate student (Daniel Kalantar). The X-pinch generates tiny plasma source are used to study the properties or near-solid density plasmas at 10,000,000 K. This source is developed for possible application to biomedical radiography. The X-pinch is a very tiny, short-lived X-ray source that was invented at the P.N. Lebedev Physical Institute in Moscow and Hammer's lab has been developing it into a practical point X-ray source and a testing ground for high energy density plasma physics, atomic physics, and X-ray spectroscopy.

Hammer and his research group studied unique plasmas including the intermediate atomic number X-pinches made from Ti and Mo, which are almost solid density, almost fully stripped of their electrons, and ~15,000,000 K. The research group's ability to understand the unique plasmas positioned them to take part in the development of the pulsed-power side of the high energy density laboratory plasma (HEDLP) program in the United States starting in 1993.

Since then, the HEDLP Center of Excellence had formed in 2002. The theme of the center is current-driven HED plasmas (Z-pinches). Hammer has been the principal investigator and director of the center since 2007.

== Honors and awards ==
- 2018: Distinguished Career Award, Fusion Power Associates Board of Directors
- 2006: Ruth and Joel Spira Award for Excellence in Teaching
- 2006: Cornell College of Engineering Teaching Award
- 2006: Cornell IEEE Professor of the Year Award
- 2005: McCormack Excellence in Advising Award
- 2004: IEEE Plasma Science and Applications Committee Award
- 2003: Elected Fellow, AAAS
- 1998: Cornell College of Engineering Teaching Award
- 1993: Named J. Carleton Ward, Jr. Professor of Nuclear Energy Engineering
- 1995: Elected Fellow, IEEE
- 1981: Elected Fellow, APS
