= Richard D. Robinson (engineer) =

American engineer

- Education: Columbia University (PhD, 2004); Tufts University
- Scientific career
- Fields: Materials science
- Workplaces: Cornell University

Richard D. Robinson is an Associate Professor of Materials Science and Engineering at Cornell University.

== Education ==
Robinson grew up in Indianapolis and discovered science and engineering through a National Science Foundation program in eighth grade. Robinson obtained his BS and MS in mechanical engineering at Tufts University and his PhD in Applied Physics 2004 at Columbia University.

== Academic career ==
Richard Robinson joined Lawrence Berkeley National Laboratory and University of California, Berkeley as a Lawrence Chemist Postdoctoral Fellow in Chemistry and Materials Science in the group of Paul Alivisatos, 2004-2008. In July 2008, he joined the Department of Materials Science and Engineering at Cornell University as an assistant professor. In 2016, Robinson spent time at the Institute of Chemistry at Hebrew University on a Fulbright Scholarship.

== Research ==
Robinson works on size-, shape-, composition-, and surface-controlled nanoparticle synthesis, and nanoparticle assembly, and nanoparticle assembly for electronic and catalytic applications. Robinson's work was featured in the Cornell Chronicle, Physics Today, and R&D. In addition, Robinson has received many awards and distinctions for his research, such as the National Science Foundation Early Career Development Award, Fulbright Scholar, and the R&D 100 Award for his work on nanocrystal solar cells.

As of Spring 2025, his publications have received 6,945 citations, and his h-index is 38.

== Honors and awards ==
Robinson received an NSF CAREER Award from the National Science Foundation and a 3M Non-Tenured Faculty Award in 2012.
