= Samuel B. Bacharach =

American university teacher

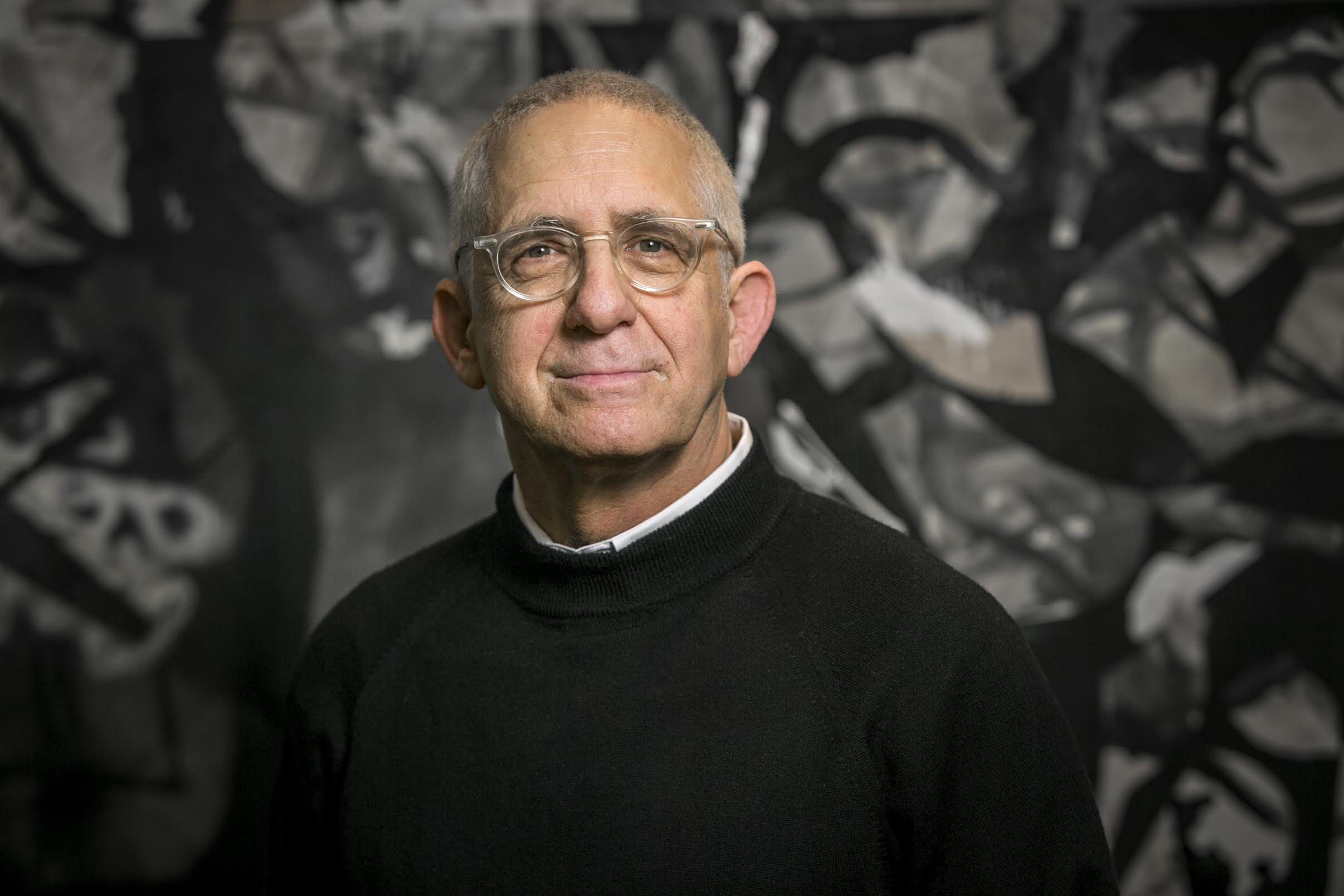
- Samuel B. Bacharach, McKelvey-Grant Professor, Cornell University & BLG Co-Founder
- Scientific career
- Fields: Organizational behavior
- Institutions: Cornell University

Samuel B. Bacharach is the McKelvey-Grant Professor in the Department of organizational behavior at Cornell University’s New York State School of Industrial and Labor Relations. He is the head of Cornell University’s New York City-based Institute for Workplace Studies. He is the co-founder of the Bacharach Leadership Group, an organization that focuses on helping organizations develop leaders, and the co-founder of Pragmatic Leadership, a mobile simulation platform that trains leaders in a modular approach.

== Early life and education ==
Bacharach received a BS in economics from NYU and an MS and Ph.D. from the University of Wisconsin. He joined Cornell University in 1974.

== Career ==
Bacharach's leadership books include: Get Them on Your Side, Keep Them on Your Side, The Agenda Mover and Transforming the Clunky Organization.

Bacharach writes a regular column for Inc. Magazine that focuses on the pragmatic skills of leadership and is a frequent speaker at Inc. conferences and events.

Among the organizations trained in his "Pragmatic Leadership" approach are: Computer Sciences Corporation, PepsiAmericas, March of Dimes, Walmart, Citigroup, International Monetary Fund, Mellon Financial, Starbucks, BASF, BMC Software, Boeing, InterContinental Hotels Group, Chubb, Nintendo, Bristol-Myers Squibb, Devon Energy, TeleTech, and Gap Inc.
