= Huili Grace Xing =

Electrical engineering professor

- Spouse: Debdeep Jena

Academic background
- Education: BS, Physics, Peking University; MS, Material Science and Engineering, Lehigh University; PhD, Electrical Engineering, 2003, University of California, Santa Barbara
- Thesis: Growth, fabrication and characterization of gallium nitride based bipolar transistors (2003)

Academic work
- Institutions: Cornell University College of Engineering; University of Notre Dame

Huili Grace Xing is the William L. Quackenbush Professor of Electrical and Computer Engineering, and Materials Science and Engineering in the Cornell University College of Engineering. In 2019, Xing was elected a Fellow of the American Physical Society (APS) "for pioneering contributions in polar wide-bandgap semiconductors, 2D crystal semiconductors and layered crystals," as well as Fellow of the American Association for the Advancement of Science (AAAS) in 2021.

== Early life and education ==
Xing received a Bachelor's degree in Physics from Peking University before moving to the United States for her Master's degree in Material Science and Engineering at Lehigh University. She then chose to pursue a career with devices that use material properties, and enrolled at the University of California, Santa Barbara for her Ph.D. in Electrical Engineering.

== Career ==
Xing joined the University of Notre Dame (UND) in 2004 as an assistant professor of engineering. She was selected by the Air Force Office of Scientific Research as part of the 2008 Young Investigator Program as someone who "shows exceptional ability and promise for conducting basic research." The following year, she was the recipient of a 2009 National Science Foundation (NSF) Early Career Development (CAREER) Award for her project "Graphene and Graphene Nanoribbon Optoelectronic Properties and Devices." In 2010, Debdeep Jena and Xing received separate Department of Defense funding through the Defense Advanced Research Projects Agency for a project to create new gallium nitride (GaN) ultraviolet light sources that can be used by soldiers to purify water in the field. She received more funding from the U.S. Department of Energy’s Advanced Research Projects Agency-Energy in 2013 for "projects aimed at developing next-generation power conversion devices that could dramatically transform how power is controlled and converted through the grid."

Xing left UND in 2015 to join the Cornell University College of Engineering as the Richard E. Lunquist Sesquicentennial Faculty Fellow with a joint appointment in the School of Electrical and Computer Engineering and the Department of Material Science and Engineering. In this role, she worked alongside her husband, Debdeep Jena, to create GaN power diodes capable of serving as the building blocks for future GaN power switches. The group built a GaN power-switching device that could support 2,000 volts of electricity. As a result of her research, Xing was selected to join the national consortium to develop future cellular infrastructure. She was also elected the first William L. Quackenbush Professor of Electrical and Computer Engineering.

In 2019, Xing was elected a Fellow of the American Physical Society (APS) "for pioneering contributions in polar wide-bandgap semiconductors, 2D crystal semiconductors, and layered crystals." During the COVID-19 pandemic, Xing was appointed to a two-year term as Associate Dean for Research, Entrepreneurship, and Graduate Studies for the College of Engineering. In this role, she co-created a material structure that simultaneously exhibits superconductivity and the quantum Hall effect. Her co-authored paper "Molecular beam homoepitaxy on bulk AlN enabled by aluminum-assisted surface cleaning" was selected as an Editor’s Pick in the journal Applied Physics Letters. Xing also led a research team to investigate durable, energy-efficient, pausable processing in polymorphic memories (DEEP3M), where computational capabilities are pushed directly into the high-capacity memories. In 2021, Xing was elected Fellow of the American Association for the Advancement of Science (AAAS).
