= Amy McCune =

American ecologist and evolutionary biologist

Amy Reed McCune
- Born: 1954 (age 71–72)
- Education: Brown University Yale University
- Scientific career
- Fields: Ecology and Evolutionary Biology

Amy Reed McCune is an American ecologist and evolutionary biologist. She is a professor of ecology and evolutionary biology at Cornell University. McCune specializes in the history of life through the study of fish. McCune’s research examines a variety of fish taxa, from ancient lineages such as lungfishes, sturgeons, and gars to modern fish. Studying groups such as zebrafish, cichlids, and pupfishes, addressing why certain species have certain traits. Her lab focuses on evolution, using methodologies including paleobiology, phylogenetics, genetics, and morphologyne was appointed Senior Associate Dean of the Cornell College of Agriculture and Life Sciences in 2017. Contributing to departmental governance and broader institutional planning. In 2017, McCune was appointed Senior Associate Dean of the Ecology and Evolutionary Biology department. McCune is also a Faculty Curator of Ichthyology at the Cornell Museum of Vertebrates. In this role, she provided direct oversight of the ichthyological collections, including fish fossils important to palaeobiological studies. Assisting the museum’s mission to advance the study of vertebrate diversity through fossils.

== Education ==
McCune received a Bachelor of Arts (A.B.) in biology from Brown University in 1976. McCune received a Doctor of Philosophy (Ph.D.) in biology from Yale University in 1982. McCune was a Miller Postdoctoral Fellow at the University of California, Berkeley (1982–1983).

== Career ==
McCune became an assistant professor at Cornell University in 1983. McCune served as the chair of the Department of Ecology and Evolutionary Biology from 2011 to 2017. McCune is also a faculty curator of fishes at the Cornell University Museum of Vertebrates.

== Selected publications ==
- Lencer, E. S.; Riccio, M.; McCune, A. R. (2016). "Changes in growth rates of oral jaw elements produce evolutionary novelty in Bahamian pupfish". Journal of Morphology. 277 (7): 935–47. doi:10.1002/jmor.20547. PMID 27103074. S2CID 46769821.
- Longo, S. J. M.; Riccio, M.; McCune, A. R. (2013). "Homology of lungs and gas bladders: insights from arterial vasculature". Journal of Morphology. 274 (6): 687–703. doi:10.1002/jmor.20128. PMID 23378277. S2CID 29995935.
- Cass, A. N.; Servetnick, M. D.; McCune, A. R. (2013). "Expression of a lung developmental cassette in the adult and developing zebrafish swimbladder". Evolution and Development. 15 (2): 119–132. doi:10.1111/ede.12022. PMID 25098637. S2CID 20544066.
- Wagner, C. E.; McCune, A. R.; Lovette, I. J. (2012). "Recent speciation in sympatric Tanganyikan cichlid colour-morphs". Molecular Ecology. 21 (13): 3283–3292. doi:10.1111/j.1365-294X.2012.05607.x. PMID 22612462.
- McCune, A. R.; Schimenti, J. C. (2012). "Using Genetic Networks and Homology to Understand the Evolution of Phenotypic Traits". Current Genomics. 13 (1): 74–84. doi:10.2174/138920212799034785. PMC 3269019. PMID 22942677.
- Rabosky, D.; McCune, A. R. (2010). "Reinventing species selection with molecular phylogenies". Trends in Ecology and Evolutionary Biology. 25 (2): 68–74. doi:10.1016/j.tree.2009.07.002. PMID 19740566.
- Wagner, C. E.; McCune, A. R. (2009). "Contrasting patterns of spatial genetic structure in sympatric rock-dwelling cichlid fishes". Evolution. 63 (5): 1312–1326. doi:10.1111/j.1558-5646.2009.00612.x. PMID 19154384.
- McCune, A. R. (2004). "Diversity and speciation of semionotid fishes in Mesozoic rift lakes". In U. Dieckman; M. Doebli; J. A. J. Metz (eds.). Adaptive Speciation. Cambridge University Press. pp. 362–379. doi:10.1017/CBO9781139342179.021. ISBN 978-0-521-82842-0.
- McCune, A. R.; Carlson, R. L. (2004). "Twenty ways to lose your bladder: Common natural mutants in zebrafish and widespread convergence of swim bladder loss among teleost fishes". Evolution and Development. 6 (4): 246–259. doi:10.1111/j.1525-142X.2004.04030.x. PMID 15230965. S2CID 39502888.
- McClure, M.; McCune, A. R. (2003). "Evidence for developmental linkage of pigment patterns with body size and shape in Danios (Teleostei: Cyprinidae)". Evolution. 57 (8): 1863–1875. doi:10.1111/j.0014-3820.2003.tb00594.x. PMID 14503628.
- McCune, A. R.; Fuller, R. C.; Aquilina, A. A.; Dawley, R. M.; Fadool, J. M.; Houle, D.; Travis, J.; Kondrashov, A. S. (2002). "A low genomic number of recessive lethals in natural populations of bluefin killifish and zebrafish". Science. 296 (5577): 2398–2401. Bibcode:2002Sci...296.2398M. doi:10.1126/science.1071757. PMID 12089444. S2CID 41962098.
- McCune, A. R.; Lovejoy, N. R. (1998). "The relative rate of sympatric and allopatric speciation in fishes: Tests using DNA sequence divergence between sister species and among clades". In D. J. Howard; S. H. Berlocher (eds.). Endless Forms: Species and Speciation. Oxford University Press. pp. 172–185. ISBN 9780195109016.
- McCune, A. R. (1996). "Biogeographic and stratigraphic evidence for rapid speciation in semionotid fishes". Paleobiology. 22 (1): 34–48. Bibcode:1996Pbio...22...34M. doi:10.1017/S0094837300016006. S2CID 88420145.
- Normark, B. B.; McCune, A. R.; Harrison, R. G. (1991). "Phylogenetic relationships of neopterygian fishes inferred from mitochondrial DNA sequences". Molecular Biology and Evolution. 8 (6): 819–834. doi:10.1093/oxfordjournals.molbev.a040685. PMID 1663569.
- McCune, A. R. (1990). "Morphological anomalies in the Semionotus complex: Relaxed selection during colonization of an expanding lake". Evolution. 44 (1): 71–85. doi:10.2307/2409525. JSTOR 2409525.

== Notable Contributions ==
- Studies on rapid speciation in Mesozoic semionotoid fishes, genetic networks underlying phenotypic evolution, and developmental changes in jaw morphology. Her work has been published in high-impact journals advancing the understanding of fish evolution and broader evolutionary principles.

== Awards and honors ==
- NSF grant for the Cornell University Museum of Vertebrates (2006–2008).
- NSF grant for the Cornell University Museum of Vertebrates (2002–2004).
