= David Erickson (academic) =

Professor of mechanical and aerospace engineering

- Education: University of Alberta (B.Sc.); University of Toronto (M.A.Sc., Ph.D.); California Institute of Technology (postdoctoral fellow)
- Known for: Research on optofluidic and microfluidic systems; point-of-care diagnostic platforms
- Awards: Presidential Early Career Award for Scientists and Engineers (2011)
- Scientific career
- Fields: Mechanical engineering; microfluidics; optofluidics; point-of-care diagnostics
- Workplaces: Cornell University

David Erickson is a professor of mechanical and aerospace engineering at Cornell University, where he serves as the S.C. Thomas Sze Director of the Sibley School of Mechanical and Aerospace Engineering. His research spans microfluidics and optofluidics, including point-of-care diagnostic technologies for use in low-resource settings. He received a Presidential Early Career Award for Scientists and Engineers (PECASE) through the U.S. Department of Energy.

== Education ==
Erickson received a B.Sc. in mechanical engineering from the University of Alberta (1999), and M.A.Sc. (2001) and Ph.D. (2004) degrees in mechanical engineering from the University of Toronto. He completed postdoctoral work in electrical engineering at the California Institute of Technology (2005).

== Career ==
Erickson joined Cornell University in 2005 and later became the S.C. Thomas Sze Director of the Sibley School of Mechanical and Aerospace Engineering. He previously served as Associate Dean of Engineering for Research and Graduate Programs.

== Research ==
=== Point-of-care diagnostics and global health ===
Erickson has led or co-led projects developing diagnostic technologies intended for settings with limited laboratory infrastructure. A profile of the NIH-funded center PORTENT (Point of Care Technologies for Nutrition, Infection and Cancer for Global Health) described the center as a five-year initiative led by Erickson and collaborators to develop, test, and support translation of point-of-care diagnostics with international clinical partners.

In infectious disease and cancer diagnostics, a 2019 overview in The Pathologist reported that a team led by Erickson and medical collaborators designed and tested a portable system ("TINY") for Kaposi's sarcoma diagnosis that can operate without reliable electricity in resource-limited settings.

Erickson has also been involved in smartphone-enabled diagnostic platforms. A 2016 report in TechCrunch described Cornell's "FeverPhone" effort to develop a portable, smartphone-linked diagnostic system for febrile diseases, citing Erickson as a lead Cornell engineering professor on the project. An earlier ABC News feature reported on Cornell's "SmartCARD" smartphone accessory for cholesterol measurement and quoted Erickson describing the rationale for smartphone-based diagnostics.

=== Nutrition and anemia screening ===
In 2024, Cornell announced that "AnemiaPhone," a point-of-care technology for assessing iron deficiency, was transferred to India's Indian Council of Medical Research (ICMR) for integration into national programs. The Times of India similarly reported on the transfer and described the system as a portable strip-and-reader workflow designed for rapid screening at the point of need. A 2025 ICMR document describing an expression-of-interest for manufacturing a device based on AnemiaPhone technology referenced its development at Cornell and planned transfer for scale-up in India.

=== Optofluidics and energy-related work ===
Erickson has published research on optofluidic systems, including applications to energy. A 2011 review article in Nature Photonics (co-authored with David Sinton and Demetri Psaltis) outlined optofluidic approaches for sunlight-based fuel production and solar-energy collection and control.

== Entrepreneurship and commercialization ==
Erickson has been associated with startup efforts based on academic research in diagnostics, instrumentation, and energy.

In biopharmaceutical analytics, Waters Corporation announced in 2025 that it acquired Halo Labs, describing Halo Labs as a developer of imaging technologies for particle analysis in biologic therapeutics. A trade publication summary similarly described the acquisition and Halo Labs' particle-analysis platform.

In carbon utilization, Dimensional Energy reported a $20 million Series A funding round in 2023; the round was also covered by TechCrunch and other business press as supporting sustainable aviation fuel and carbon-to-products development.

== Awards and honors ==
- Fellow, American Institute for Medical and Biological Engineering (AIMBE) (2022).
- Fellow, Canadian Academy of Engineering (2021).
- Finalist, NRG COSIA Carbon XPRIZE (Dimensional Energy) (2019).
- Fellow, Optica (formerly the Optical Society of America) (2012).
- Fellow, American Society of Mechanical Engineers (ASME) (2014).
- Presidential Early Career Award for Scientists and Engineers (PECASE) (awarded through the U.S. Department of Energy) (2011).
- U.S. Department of Energy, Office of Science Early Career Research Program award (FY2010).
- National Science Foundation Faculty Early Career Development Program (CAREER) Award (2009).
- Defense Advanced Research Projects Agency (DARPA) Microsystems Technology Office (MTO) Young Faculty Award (2007).

== Selected publications ==
- McCloskey, Duncan; Semeere, Aggrey; Ayanga, Racheal; Laker-Oketta, Miriam; Lukande, Robert; Semakadde, Matthew; et al. (January 13, 2023). "LAMP-enabled diagnosis of Kaposi's sarcoma for sub-Saharan Africa". Science Advances. 9 (2) eadc8913. Bibcode:2023SciA....9C8913M. doi:10.1126/sciadv.adc8913. PMC 11318663. PMID 36638178.
- Snodgrass, Ryan; Gardner, Andrea; Semeere, Aggrey; Kopparthy, Varun L.; Duru, Jens; Maurer, Toby; Martin, Jeffrey; Cesarman, Ethel; Erickson, David; et al. (September 11, 2018). "A portable device for nucleic acid quantification powered by sunlight, a flame or electricity". Nature Biomedical Engineering. 2 (9): 657–665. doi:10.1038/s41551-018-0286-y. PMC 6425734. PMID 30906647.
- Lu, Zhengda; O'Dell, Dakota; Srinivasan, Balaji; Rey, Elizabeth; Wang, Ruisheng; Vemulapati, Sasank; Mehta, Saurabh; Erickson, David; et al. (December 4, 2017). "Rapid diagnostic testing platform for iron and vitamin A deficiency". Proceedings of the National Academy of Sciences of the United States of America. 114 (51): 13513–13518. Bibcode:2017PNAS..11413513L. doi:10.1073/pnas.1711464114. PMC 5754775. PMID 29203653.
- Oncescu, Vlad; Mancuso, Matthew; Erickson, David (2014). "Cholesterol testing on a smartphone". Lab on a Chip. 14 (4): 759–763. Bibcode:2014LChip..14..759O. doi:10.1039/C3LC51194D. PMID 24336861.
- Erickson, David; Sinton, David; Psaltis, Demetri (2011). "Optofluidics for energy applications". Nature Photonics. 5 (10): 583–590. Bibcode:2011NaPho...5..583E. doi:10.1038/nphoton.2011.209.
- Yang, Allen H. J.; Moore, Sean D.; Schmidt, Bradley S.; Klug, Matthew; Lipson, Michal; Erickson, David; et al. (2009). "Optical manipulation of nanoparticles and biomolecules in sub-wavelength slot waveguides". Nature. 457 (7225): 71–75. Bibcode:2009Natur.457...71Y. doi:10.1038/nature07593. PMID 19122638.
