= John Nesheim =

American author, and venture capitalist

John Nesheim is an American author, and mentor to entrepreneurs who completed his career by teaching entrepreneurship for Cornell University and other universities in Asia and Europe. His research findings are used by entrepreneurs, investors, governments, universities, corporations, and Wall Street. Nesheim is the author of the book High Tech Startup.
