= Yiqi Luo =

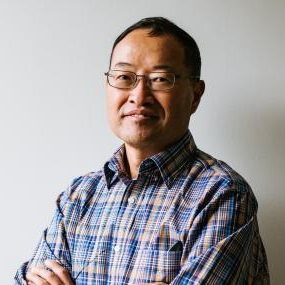
- Education: Yangzhou University (B.S), University of California, Davis, (Ph.D.), University of California, Los Angeles (post-doc), Stanford University (post-doc)
- Occupations: Ecologist and Professor
- Website: https://ecolab.cals.cornell.edu/?member_info&id=52

Yiqi Luo (骆亦其) is an ecosystem ecologist and biogeochemist specializing in systems analysis and modeling. His interests lie in terrestrial ecosystem and carbon cycle modeling, with some of his more renowned papers focused on understanding how novel methods of modeling can help to understand soil carbon dynamics. He is currently the Liberty Hyde Bailey Professor at the School of Integrative Plant Science, Soil and Crop Sciences at Cornell University.

== Education ==
Luo received his B.S. in Agronomy from Yangzhou University (formerly Jiangsu Agriculture College) in Yangzhou, Jiangsu Province, China, in 1982. He then went on to receive his Ph.D. in Ecology from the University of California, Davis, in 1991. He then did a postdoctoral fellowship at the University of California, Los Angeles, from 1991 to 1992, and another from 1992 to 1994 at Stanford University in Palo Alto, California.

== Career ==
Luo began his teaching career in 1981, serving as a lecturer and research associate in the department of Agronomy at Yangzhou University until 1985. Following his post-doc at Stanford University, he started a role at the Desert Research Institute at the University of Nevada in 1994, where he also took up the role of Assistant Research Professor. In 1996, Luo took up a position as a visiting lecturer in the Economics department at the University of Nevada, Reno. In 1997, he was appointed Associate Research Professor at the Desert Research Institute. In 1998, he finished up his time at the Desert Research Institute, and then took up a position as associate professor at the University of Oklahoma in the department of Botany and Microbiology from 1999 to 2001, when he was then appointed a professor in the same department. He stayed at the University of Oklahoma as a Professor from 2001 to 2017, where he established a prodigious lab and was also elected a member of multiple academic societies. Following his time at the University of Oklahoma, he went on to become a professor at Northern Arizona University at the Center for Ecosystem Science and Society (ECOSS) and the department of Biology from 2017 to 2022. During this time, he also was an adjunct professor in the School of Informatics, Computing, and Cyber Systems. In 2021, he was elected Regents' Professor at Northern Arizona University, recognition of highest academic merit and unique contributions to the university. In 2022, he took up a position as the Liberty Hyde Bailey Professor at Cornell University in the School of Integrative Plant Science in Ithaca, New York, where he has been appointed since then.

== Research ==
The overall goal of the research in his lab is to advance predictive understanding of biogeochemical cycles of terrestrial ecosystems under the global change. Key scientific questions to be addressed include: (1) how global change alters biogeochemistry of terrestrial ecosystems and what is the underlying mechanism for such alterations, and (2) how the changes in biogeochemistry of terrestrial ecosystems feedback to global change. These scientific questions are addressed by integrating data with ecosystem models. The main approaches include process-based modeling, data synthesis, data-model fusion via data assimilation and machine learning, and theoretical analysis.

His lab developed the Dynamic Disequilibrium framework to assess future land carbon sink dynamics, the Matrix Approach to unify land carbon cycle models, and the Traceability Framework to diagnose the uncertainty in model predictions of land carbon cycle.

== Notable publications ==
- Luo, Y., Wan, S., Hui, D. & Wallace, L. L. Acclimatization of soil respiration to warming in a tall grass prairie. Nature 413, 622–625 (2001).
- Chhabra, A. et al. Chapter 6: Carbon and Other Biogeochemical Cycles. (2013).
- Knapp, A. K. et al. Consequences of More Extreme Precipitation Regimes for Terrestrial Ecosystems. BioScience 58, 811–821 (2008).
- Davidson, E. A., Janssens, I. A. & Luo, Y. On the variability of respiration in terrestrial ecosystems: moving beyond Q10. Global Change Biology 12, 154–164 (2006).
- Luo, Y. et al. Progressive Nitrogen Limitation of Ecosystem Responses to Rising Atmospheric Carbon Dioxide. BioScience 54, 731–739 (2004).

== Awards ==
- Elected a fellow of the American Association for the Advancement of Science (AAAS) for the year of 2013
- Elected a Union Fellow of the American Geophysical Union (AGU) in 2016
- Elected a Fellow of the Ecological Society of America (ESA) in 2018
- Highly Cited Researcher on Web of Science for the field of Environment and Ecology in 2016, 2017, 2020, and 2021
- Named on the Reuters Hot List of the world's top climate scientists in 2021 (ranked 177 of 1000)
