= Tanjay =

Component city in Negros Oriental, Philippines

Tanjay Dakbayán sa Tanhay Santiago de los Ríos de Tanay
- Component city
- City of Tanjay
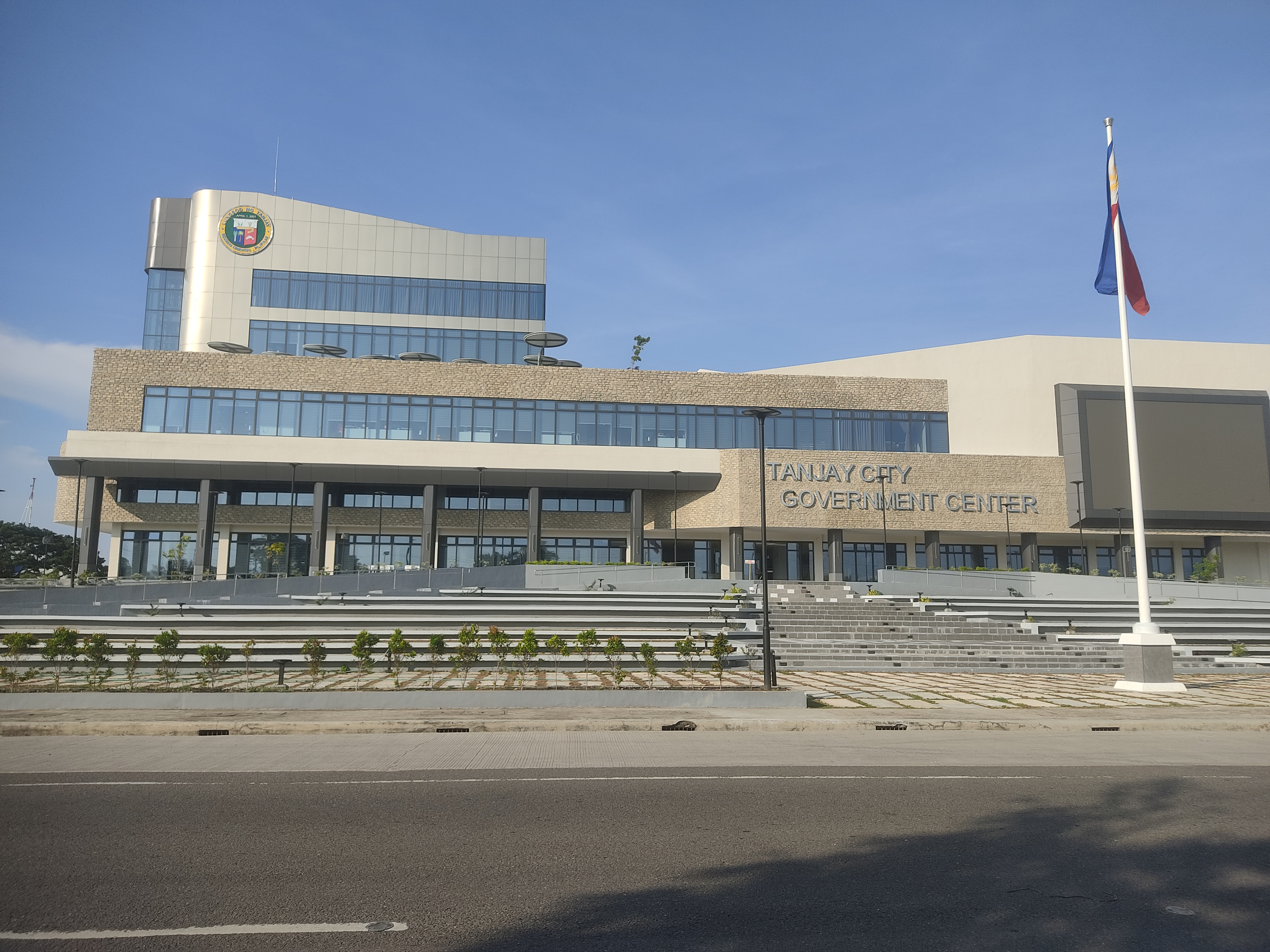
- Tanjay City Government Center

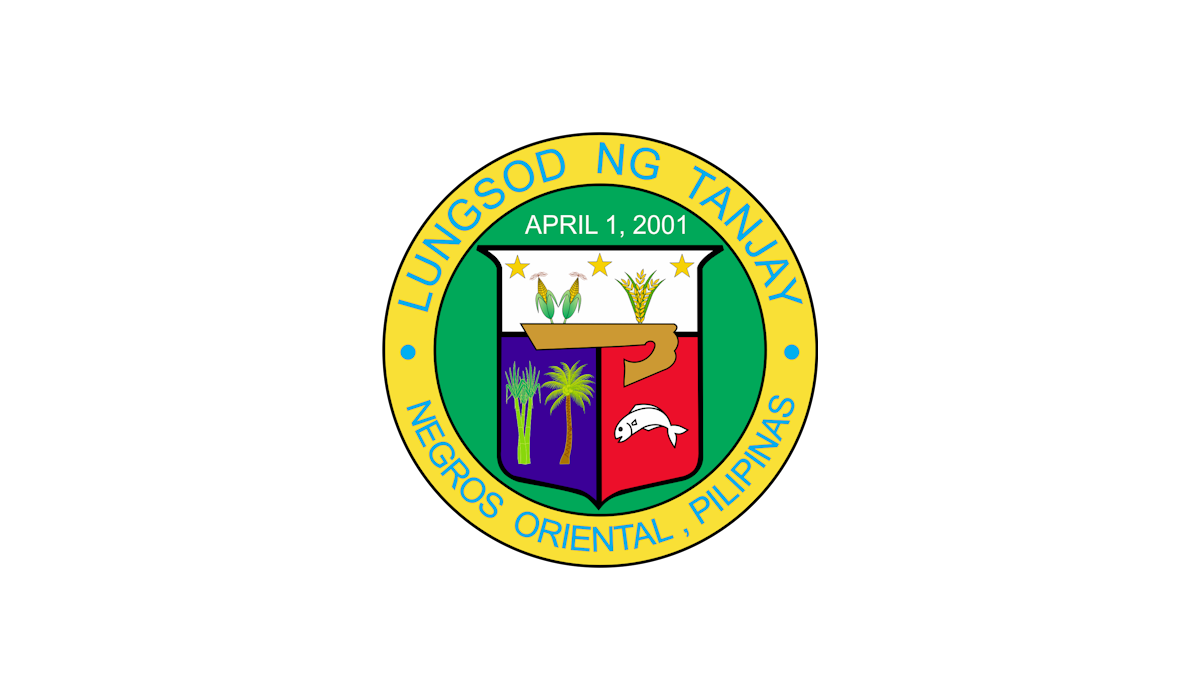
- Flag Seal

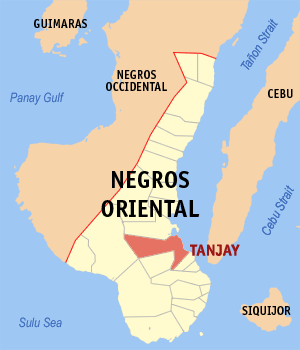
- Map of Negros Oriental with Tanjay highlighted
- Interactive map of Tanjay
- Location within the Philippines
- Coordinates: 9°31′N 123°10′E
- Country: Philippines
- Region: Negros Island Region
- Province: Negros Oriental
- District: 2nd district
- Founded: June 11, 1580
- Cityhood: April 1, 2001
- Barangays: 24 (see Barangays)

Government
  - Type: Sangguniang Panlungsod
  - Mayor: Jose T. Orlino (NPC)
  - Vice Mayor: Reynil C. Arcide (Lakas)
  - Representative: Maisa Sagarbarria (Lakas)
  - City Council: Members: Josef James T. Gara; Gerald Jun L. Borromeo; Agapito R. Silva; Ramir R. Mira; Meriam N. Busmion; Jovencio S. Bumanglag, Sr.; Jocelyn C. Oñez; Joven C. Sagario; Yul Yarden R. Yee; Edmond B. Vergara; Feliciano R. Torres, Jr. ^{‡}; Jaf Vincent M. Margasiño ^{◌}; ‡ ex officio ABC president; ◌ ex officio SK chairman
  - Electorate: 59,821 voters (2025)

Area
  - Total: 267.05 km^{2} (103.11 sq mi)
- Elevation: 209 m (686 ft)
- Highest elevation: 1,761 m (5,778 ft)
- Lowest elevation: 0 m (0 ft)

Population (2024 census)
  - Total: 84,593
  - Density: 316.77/km^{2} (820.43/sq mi)
  - Households: 20,077

Economy
  - Income class: 3rd city income class
  - Poverty incidence: 22.33% (2023)
  - Revenue: ₱ 940.8 million (2024)
  - Assets: ₱ 3,409 million (2024)
  - Expenditure: ₱ 414.3 million (2024)
  - Liabilities: ₱ 804.3 million (2024)

Service provider
  - Electricity: Negros Oriental 2 Electric Cooperative (NORECO 2)
- Time zone: UTC+8 (PST)
- ZIP code: 6204
- PSGC: 074621000
- IDD : area code: +63 (0)35
- Native languages: Cebuano; Magahat; Tagalog

Tanjay, officially the City of Tanjay (Cebuano: Dakbayan sa Tanhay; Filipino: Lungsod ng Tanjay; Spanish: Municipio de Tanjay), is a component city in the province of Negros Oriental, Philippines. According to the 2024 census, it has a population of 84,593 people.

The city is home to two indigenous languages, Minagahat and the Cebuano as listed by the Komisyon ng Wikang Filipino.

== History ==
=== Prehistory ===
The earliest evidence for human habitation dates back to the 1st to 4th centuries and products from the 12th century Song dynasty which were discovered in recent excavations and was said to have ventured perhaps in the area we now know as Támpi in Amlan. American researcher Laura Lee Junker excavated the remains of a Precolonial Kingdom or Polity which she labelled the Tanjay River Polity in archeological excavations in 1994, within the said area of Tanjay.

=== Bol-anon emigration ===
In 1563, a surprise raid by undercover Ternatean forces aided by the Portuguese upon Bo-ol resulted in destruction of much of the settlement, from mass looting to enslavement. Consequently, a majority of the local Bol-anon survivors dispersed in an exodus to nearby islands, notably eastern Negros, Siquijor, and the northern coast of the Zamboanga Peninsula where they founded Dapitan. The majority, however, settled in the lowlands of southeastern Negros and founded Tanay, the old pronunciation of present-day Tanjay.

=== Spanish colonial period ===
==== Explorations ====
Two years later in 1565, Esteban Rodríguez of the Legazpi expedition, caught by storm on his way back to Cebu from Bohol, sought refuge in the eastern shore of the island and met local Negritos called ata, agta, or ati.

The first map of the Negros Island, dated 1572 and charted by Diego López de Povedano identified it as Buglas, the native reference derived from the tall cane-like grass which ranged thick and persistent over the island (now known as cógon).

His report upon returning to Cebu prompted Fray Andrés de Urdaneta to visit the island, landing in what is now Escalante in Negros Occidental. In the same year, Capitán Mateo de Cádiz led a small expedition which reached an area near present-day Tanjay. Capitán Miguel de Loarca followed with a larger expedition and force and proceeded to lay claim to what the Spaniards called the Island of Negros. Both Povedano and Loarca pointed to the Tanay-Dumaguete area as the most densely populated in the eastern half of the island. Tanay, considered the more important settlement, was made the administrative capital of Negros Island. It however, remained under the jurisdiction of the province of Cebu. It was the first archdeacon of Cebu, Fray Diego Ferreira, who sent Fray Gabriel Sánchez and other Augustinian priests to the new territory. Thus, on June 11, 1580, Tanjay was founded as the Missión de Santiago de los Ríos de Tanay, the center of religious supervision for Dumaguete, Marabago, Siaton and Manalongon.

When it officially shifted from Tanay to Tanjay is not exactly known, but may have started as a typographical error on an official document sometime in the 18th century.

From these few parishes along the coast, the priests administered the sacraments to the people in the hinterlands and served as mission to the wandering locals, converting them to Christianity. Evangelization began very slowly because of the great distance over hills from one hut to another.

By 1587, the Augustinians had almost abandoned all missions in Negros due to lack of manpower. Evidence, however, points to a secular priest in charge of the Parish of Tanjay before 1602. It was in 1600 that these missions regained pastoral attention when the Jesuits were assigned in Negros. The first priest of Tanjay, Fray Diego Ferreira, was appointed in 1589. Tanjay parish, under the patronage of St. James the greater is the oldest in the Orient.

Where the current cuartel municipal (city gaol) and police station is currently situated was the house of a certain Ponciano Agir, one of the principales of the town, who mortgaged the house to a certain Gerónimo de Villegas, a peninsular Spaniard engineer sometime in 1884, who then paid Ponciano Agir an extra 1,341 pesos oro to finalise the sale on the 19th of February of 1886. But during the term of the mortgage, it was leased out to the Spanish government as the headquarters of the Guardia Civil command in Tanjay and its arrabales of Amblán, Ayuquitán, and Pamplona.

==== Saint James the Geater Parish, Tanjay City Negros Oriental ====
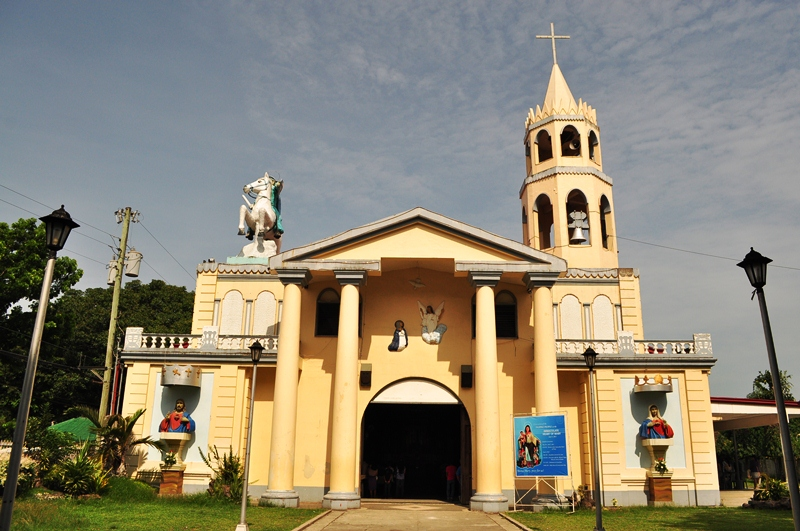
Roman Catholic Parish of Tanjay, rebuilt sometime in 1930

Catholicism was brought to this part of Oriental Negros by the Augustinians. The Definitorium dated the 11th of June, 1580 mentions of the foundation of the Tanjay Parish, with the communities of Dumaguete, Siaton, Marabago and Manalongon. Due to the lack of personnel on the part of the Augustinian Fathers, the spiritual care of this new foundation was entrusted to the care of the Diocesan Clergy of Cebu. This is why the reason Tanjay Parish became part of the Diocese of Cebu.

Later in 1851, at the request of the Bishop of Cebu, the Augustinian Recollect Fathers took over the spiritual care of the Parish and up to the time the diocesan clergy again took over. Then when the Diocese of Jaro was erected in 1865, Tanjay as part of Negros became part of the Diocese (since the whole island was made part of the new Diocese). And then, when the Diocese of Bacolod was erected in 1933, again, Tanjay became part of this new Diocese (since Oriental Negros and Siquijor were made part of the new Diocese). And in 1955, Tanjay became part of the Diocese of Dumaguete. Up to the present, it is still part of the Diocese of Dumaguete.

From the Parish of Tanjay, came later the following parishes: Dumaguete was separated in 1620; Amlan in 1848; Siaton in 1848; Bacong (Marabago) in 1849; San Jose (Ayuquitan) in 1895. And when Dumaguete became a Diocese, again two more parishes were taken from Tanjay: Pamplona in 1960, and Santa Cruz in 1969.

==== Sinulog de Tanjay ====
The Sinulog is purely Tanjay tradition. It is a religious devotional festive dance with a mock battle depicting the war between the Moros and the Christians in Granada, Spain in centuries past. It is based on the legend that St. James miraculously aided the Christians by riding on white horse from the heavens and slew hundreds of Moors.

Thus, the Sinulog is a religious exercise glorifying the Christians and honouring the feast day of Señor Santiago who is the patron saint of Tanjay and also of Spain.

The Sinulog was first performed in this town in 1814, under the auspices of the Catholic Church with Fray Fernando Félix de Zúñiga (1814–1816) as Parish Priest. It then became the highlight of every fiesta celebration during the incumbencies of succeeding parish priests from Presbyter Pedro Bracamonte (1817–1845) to Fray Jorge Gargacilla, OAR (1885–1889). Fray Jorge Adán del Pilar OAR (1889–1898) dispensed with the Sinulog in 1897 for reasons known only to him, but then his successor Fray Baldomero Villareal (1898–1929) revived it in 1904 until the end of his term in 1929. There was Sinulog performance for two fiestas during the term of Fray Gregorio Santiagudo as Parish Priest in 1930–1931.

In 1932, through the initiative of group of laymen from Barrio San Isidro Tabúc and Barrio Iláud, the Sinulog was again a part of the Tanjay fiesta celebration through the years until the outbreak of the Second World War in the Pacific in 1941. The war ended in 1945 but the Sinulog came to be resumed only in 1947 and continued to be an annual fiesta spectacle until 1970 when most of the long-time devotee participants were already too old to perform, or had already died.

In the early 1970s, the Sinulog devotion was taken over by a group of elementary school children from Ilaud under Alfred García, a schoolteacher and lone survivor of the old-time Sinulog team. Until the 1987 fiesta, the Sinulog had been a children's affair. Although the children's Sinulog bore the spirit of the Tanjay fiesta celebration, it was evident that they lacked the right expressive moments and authenticity of the former groups which were composed by matured men.

Because of its historical and cultural value, the Sinulog de Tanjay was featured at the Folk Arts Theater in 1981. Later, in the year 1988, a significant milestone in Tanjay's Sinulog history was attained. In the spirit of love and concern – of keeping and preserving Tanjay tradition – then Tanjay mayor Arturo S. Regalado introduced a Sinulog contest as the highlight of that year's fiesta celebration. His purpose was to revive the real Sinulog de Tanjay, and for the different participating groups to recapture the art and skill as well as the logical movements and sequence of the Sinulog in the past. It was the then mayor's aim to let the contesting groups portray the Sinulog dance and mock battle with the right grace and ability, the right logical sequence of movements, and the ability to elicit the air and spirit of festivity. Above all, he also wanted the contestants to re-live the authenticity of the Sinulog that Tanjay used to witness in the past which our forefathers proudly termed as the "Sinulog de Tanjay", the original Sinulog.

There was a short period during the tenure of the then mayor Baltazar T. Salma that the name Sinulog de Tanjay was changed to Saulog de Tanjay for reasons that they say it connoted the Sinulog de Cebu and thus had it changed to Saulog de Tanjay. After some time, the original name was preserved to reinstate the original Sinulog de Tanjay.

The mock battle incorporates choreographed street dancing and a concluding performance as part of the Sinulog festivities. A Sinulog Merry-Making Contest is also held on the evening of July 23. The Sinulog de Tanjay celebration concludes on July 24 with a finale, follwed by an endurance contest.

=== World War II ===
In 1942, Imperial Japanese Army arrived in Tanjay. During the Japanese occupation of Tanjay, and at the height of enforced collaboration to the community by the Japanese imperial forces under the threat of summary execution, the following were appointed mayors for brief intervals: Concejo Calumpang de Martínez, Perfecto Calumpang and José E. Romero who at the time had just returned from Manila while the Commonwealth government was in exile and after having just survived the sinking of SS Corregidor, which resulted in the death of former senator Hermenegildo Villanueva and his son Jesus Pablo Villanueva, the academic supervisor of Negros Oriental Juanito Calumpang and his daughter Carolina Calumpang, among many other Visayans.

In 1945, Filipino soldiers of the 6th, 7th, 73rd and 75th Infantry Division of the Philippine Commonwealth Army and the 6th and 7th Constabulary Regiment of the Philippine Constabulary were helped by the recognized guerrillas to fight the Japanese imperial forces to liberate Tanjay.

=== Post-World War II ===
In 1950, the barrio of Pamplona was made into a separate municipality.

=== Cityhood ===
Tanjay became a city by virtue of Republic Act No. 9026. The act was signed by President Gloria Macapagal Arroyo on March 5, 2001. Tanjay was finally proclaimed a component city on April 1, 2001, after a plebiscite was conducted for the purpose.

== Geography ==
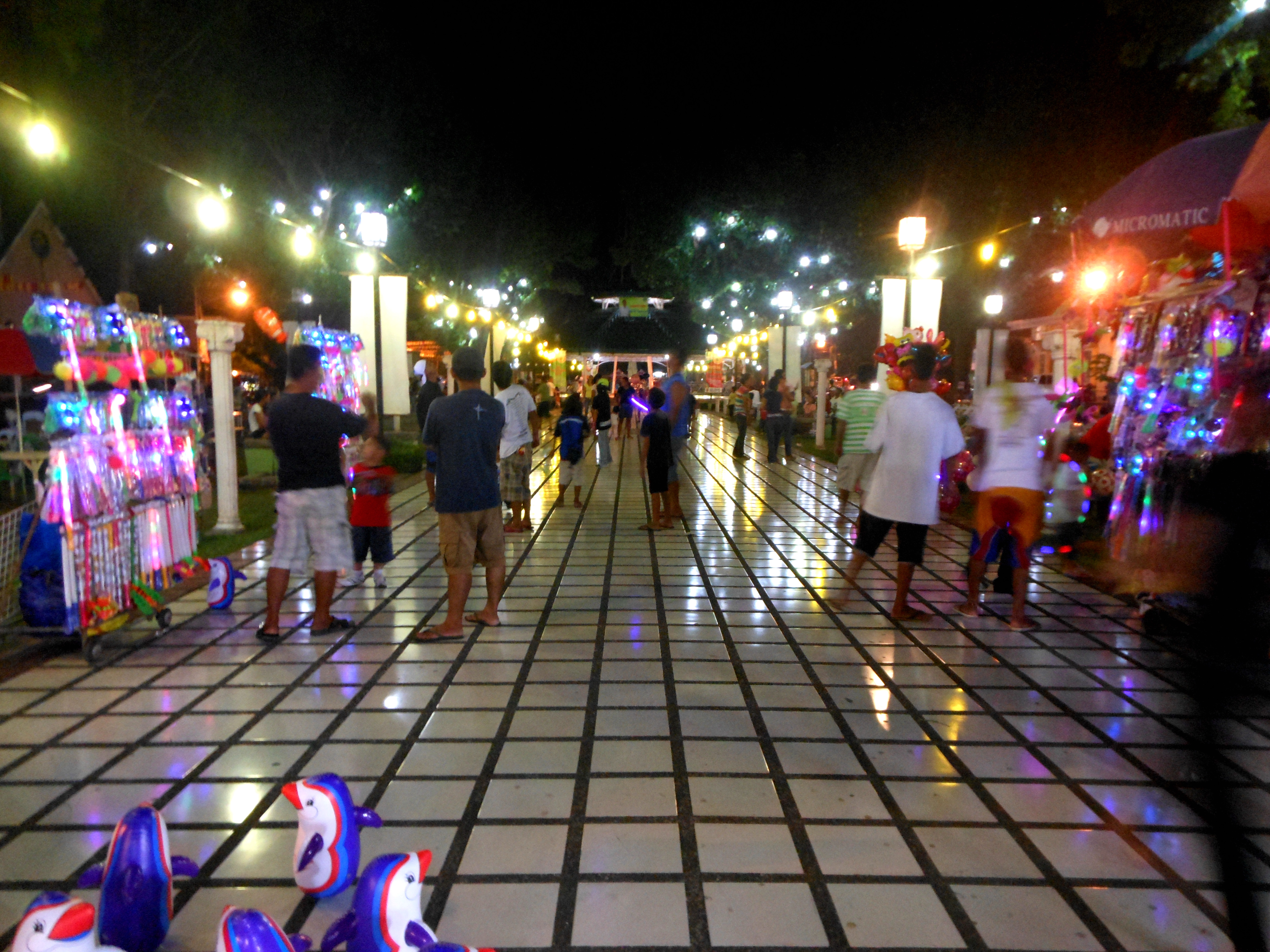
Tanjay City Rizal Park grounds at night

Tanjay's land area is 27,605 hectares (68,210 acres) and is utilized for agricultural, residential, commercial, industrial, educational, forestral and other purposes. It is the only city in Negros Oriental with a very wide flat lowland, although mountainous and rolling hills are found in the hinterland barangays of Santo Niño and Pal-ew. Rugged areas can also be found in barangays Bahi-an and Santa Cruz Nuevo.

The city is part of the 2nd congressional district of Negros Oriental. It is located 31 kilometres (19 mi) north of Dumaguete and 184 kilometres (114 mi) from Bacolod. It is bounded on the north by Bais, on the south by Amlan, on the east by the Tañon Strait and west by Pamplona.

=== Barangays ===
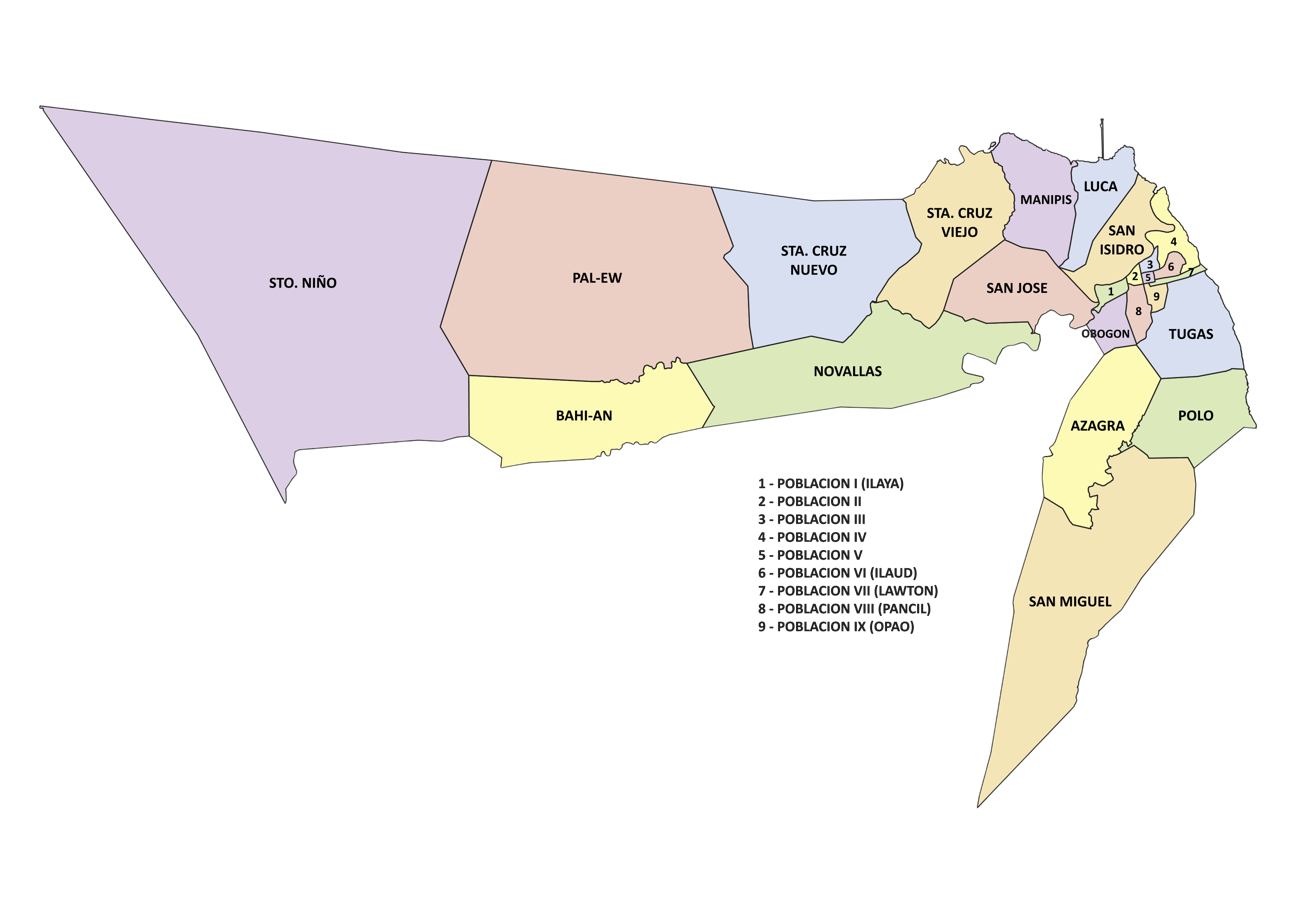
Political map of Tanjay

Tanjay is politically subdivided into 24 barangays. Each barangay consists of puroks and some have sitios.

PSGC	Barangay	Population			±% p.a.	
		2024		2010		
074621001	Azagra	6.1%	5,193	5,034	▴	0.21%
074621002	Bahi-an	2.5%	2,154	2,023	▴	0.43%
074621003	Luca	3.9%	3,266	2,672	▴	1.40%
074621004	Manipis	2.8%	2,338	2,200	▴	0.42%
074621005	Novallas	5.9%	4,976	5,334	▾	−0.48%
074621006	Obogon	4.4%	3,763	3,210	▴	1.10%
074621007	Pal-ew	6.1%	5,125	5,498	▾	−0.48%
074621008	Poblacion I (Ilaya)	2.2%	1,892	2,043	▾	−0.53%
074621009	Poblacion II	1.6%	1,315	1,500	▾	−0.90%
074621010	Poblacion III	2.4%	2,001	1,953	▴	0.17%
074621011	Poblacion IV	3.5%	2,986	2,662	▴	0.80%
074621012	Poblacion V	1.2%	1,022	1,261	▾	−1.44%
074621013	Poblacion VI (Ilaud)	3.8%	3,233	3,026	▴	0.46%
074621014	Poblacion VII (Lawton)	1.4%	1,177	1,499	▾	−1.66%
074621015	Poblacion VIII (Pancil)	2.7%	2,268	2,416	▾	−0.44%
074621016	Poblacion IX (Opao)	1.7%	1,424	1,872	▾	−1.87%
074621017	Polo	4.4%	3,746	3,642	▴	0.19%
074621018	San Isidro	5.1%	4,325	3,410	▴	1.65%
074621019	San Jose	4.9%	4,166	3,729	▴	0.77%
074621020	San Miguel	4.0%	3,345	2,409	▴	2.29%
074621021	Santa Cruz Nuevo	5.9%	4,975	4,167	▴	1.23%
074621022	Santa Cruz Viejo (Palanas)	6.0%	5,063	5,397	▾	−0.44%
074621023	Santo Niño	8.1%	6,816	7,461	▾	−0.62%
074621025	Tugas	7.2%	6,073	4,680	▴	1.82%
	Total		84,593	79,098	▴	0.46%

=== Climate ===
Climate data for Tanjay
Month	Jan	Feb	Mar	Apr	May	Jun	Jul	Aug	Sep	Oct	Nov	Dec	Year
Mean daily maximum °C (°F)	29 (84)	29 (84)	30 (86)	32 (90)	31 (88)	30 (86)	30 (86)	30 (86)	30 (86)	30 (86)	29 (84)	29 (84)	30 (86)
Mean daily minimum °C (°F)	23 (73)	23 (73)	23 (73)	24 (75)	25 (77)	25 (77)	24 (75)	24 (75)	24 (75)	24 (75)	24 (75)	23 (73)	24 (75)
Average precipitation mm (inches)	35 (1.4)	28 (1.1)	38 (1.5)	51 (2.0)	125 (4.9)	195 (7.7)	194 (7.6)	173 (6.8)	180 (7.1)	192 (7.6)	121 (4.8)	64 (2.5)	1,396 (55)
Average rainy days	9.2	8.2	9.9	11.3	22.5	27.3	28.0	27.2	27.1	26.9	19.7	12.7	230
Source: Meteoblue (Use with caution: this is modeled/calculated data, not measured locally.)

Tanjay has a moderate and pleasant climate. It is characterized by a relatively wet season from May to February and dry season from March to April. Rainfall occurs throughout the year with the heaviest volume during the months of July and August. The months of March and April are the hottest months and the coldest is December. January is the humid month while April is the least humid period. The months of November and December have the strongest wind velocities throughout the year.

== Demographics ==
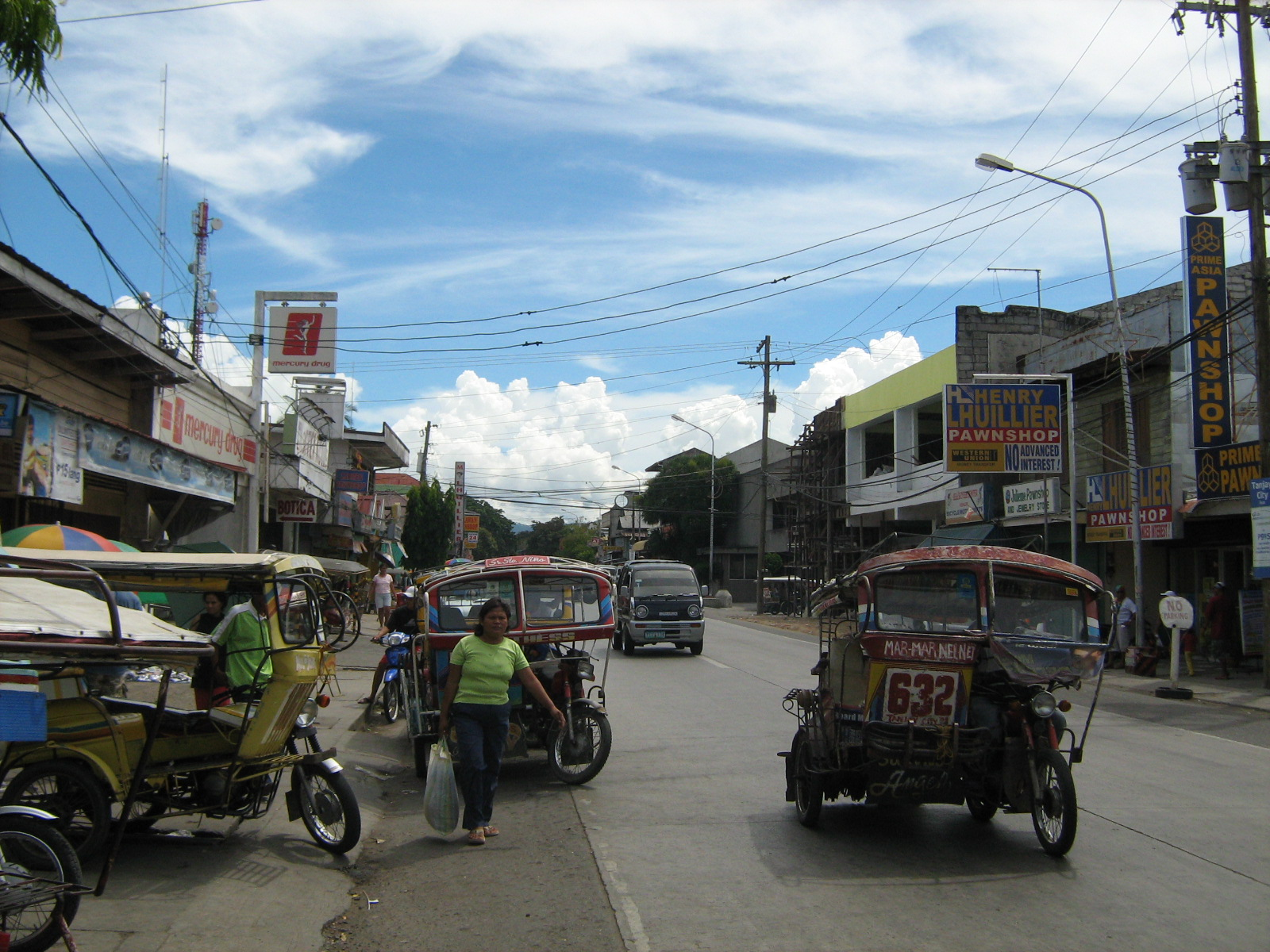
Tanjay downtown street

Population census of Tanjay
Year	Pop.	±% p.a.
1903	11,894	—
1918	15,089	+1.60%
1939	30,979	+3.48%
1948	33,064	+0.73%
1960	39,547	+1.50%
1970	51,458	+2.66%
1975	52,558	+0.43%
1980	57,299	+1.74%
1990	62,656	+0.90%
1995	65,634	+0.87%
2000	70,169	+1.44%
2007	78,539	+1.57%
2010	79,098	+0.26%
2015	80,532	+0.34%
2020	82,642	+0.55%
2024	84,593	+0.56%
Source: Philippine Statistics Authority

== Economy ==
Poverty incidence of Tanjay (%)

Source: Philippine Statistics Authority

== Government ==
The last capitán municipal of Tanjay at the end of the Spanish regime was Don José Muñoz, natural son of Fray José Antonio Enrique Muñoz-Górriz y Zurbito, OSA and Liberata Asunción Teves y Villamil, a sangley from Dumaguete. Prior to this, he was gobernadorcillo, owing to his mother's naturalised indio status that made him eligible to sit in that position. Don Agapito Calumpang y Silva, who was a cabeza de barangay, was also a former gobernadorcillo of Tanjay.

Upon the arrival of the Americans and the reorganization of local political structures, Don José Muñoz was appointed as presidente municipal while Don Agapito Calumpang was appointed as vice presidente municipal. Andrés Molas y Calipe was appointed as town secretary, Don Lucas Rodríguez y Montero as town treasurer, Don Pelagio Z. López y González, a justice of the peace under the Spanish crown, as municipal chief constable, and Félix Barot y Calumpang as justice of the peace, replacing the former.

The following is a list of mayors and vice mayors of Tanjay from 1901 to the present.

No.	Name	Term	Title	Name	Term	Title	Administration	Era
1	José María Francisco de Paula Muñoz y Teves	1901-1905	Presidente Municipal	Agapito Calumpañg y Silva	1901-1903	Vice Presidente Municipal	William Howard Taft	Insular Government
1	José María Francisco de Paula Muñoz y Teves	1901-1905	Presidente Municipal	Luis Muñoz y Calumpañg	1904-1909	Vice Presidente Municipal	Luke Edward Wright	Insular Government
2	Pelagio Zósimo López y González-Serna	1906-1909	Presidente Municipal	Luis Muñoz y Calumpañg	1904-1909	Vice Presidente Municipal	Henry Clay Ide	Insular Government
2	Pelagio Zósimo López y González-Serna	1906-1909	Presidente Municipal	Luis Muñoz y Calumpañg	1904-1909	Vice Presidente Municipal	James Francis Smith	Insular Government
3	Francisco Domingo Romero y Derecho	1909-1916	Presidente Municipal	Mateo Dael y Vea	1909-1912	Vice Presidente Municipal	William Cameron Forbes	Insular Government
3	Francisco Domingo Romero y Derecho	1909-1916	Presidente Municipal	Gonzalo Calumpañg y Silva	1912-1916	Vice Presidente Municipal	William Cameron Forbes	Insular Government
3	Francisco Domingo Romero y Derecho	1909-1916	Presidente Municipal	Gonzalo Calumpañg y Silva	1912-1916	Vice Presidente Municipal	Newton W. Gilbert	Insular Government
3	Francisco Domingo Romero y Derecho	1909-1916	Presidente Municipal	Gonzalo Calumpañg y Silva	1912-1916	Vice Presidente Municipal	Francis Burton Harrison	Insular Government
4	José Benito Atilano Joaquín Villegas y Teves	1916-1922	Presidente Municipal	Felipe Calumpañg y Mananquil	1916-1922	Vice Presidente Municipal	Francis Burton Harrison	Insular Government
4	José Benito Atilano Joaquín Villegas y Teves	1916-1922	Presidente Municipal	Felipe Calumpañg y Mananquil	1916-1922	Vice Presidente Municipal	Charles Yeater	Insular Government
4	José Benito Atilano Joaquín Villegas y Teves	1916-1922	Presidente Municipal	Felipe Calumpañg y Mananquil	1916-1922	Vice Presidente Municipal	Leonard Wood	Insular Government
5	Joaquín Villegas y Teves	1922-1931	Presidente Municipal	Marcos Regalado y López	1922-1928	Vice Presidente Municipal	Leonard Wood	Insular Government
5	Joaquín Villegas y Teves	1922-1931	Presidente Municipal	Marcos Regalado y López	1922-1928	Vice Presidente Municipal	Eugene Allen Gilmore	Insular Government
5	Joaquín Villegas y Teves	1922-1931	Presidente Municipal	Marcos Regalado y López	1922-1928	Vice Presidente Municipal	Henry L. Stimson	Insular Government
5	Joaquín Villegas y Teves	1922-1931	Presidente Municipal	Simón Reyes y Flordeliz	1928-1934	Vice Presidente Municipal	Henry L. Stimson	Insular Government
6	Crispiniano Limbaga y Villareal (Sr.)	1931-1942	Presidente Municipal / Municipal Mayor	Simón Reyes y Flordeliz	1928-1934	Vice Presidente Municipal	Eugene Allen Gilmore	Insular Government
6	Crispiniano Limbaga y Villareal (Sr.)	1931-1942	Presidente Municipal / Municipal Mayor	Simón Reyes y Flordeliz	1928-1934	Vice Presidente Municipal	Dwight F. Davis	Insular Government
6	Crispiniano Limbaga y Villareal (Sr.)	1931-1942	Presidente Municipal / Municipal Mayor	Simón Reyes y Flordeliz	1928-1934	Vice Presidente Municipal	George C. Butte	Insular Government
6	Crispiniano Limbaga y Villareal (Sr.)	1931-1942	Presidente Municipal / Municipal Mayor	Simón Reyes y Flordeliz	1928-1934	Vice Presidente Municipal	Theodore Roosevelt Jr.	Insular Government
6	Crispiniano Limbaga y Villareal (Sr.)	1931-1942	Presidente Municipal / Municipal Mayor	Simón Reyes y Flordeliz	1928-1934	Vice Presidente Municipal	Frank Murphy	Insular Government
6	Crispiniano Limbaga y Villareal (Sr.)	1931-1942	Presidente Municipal / Municipal Mayor	Ricardo Teves y Regis (Sr.)	1935-1937	Municipal Vice Mayor	Frank Murphy	Insular Government
6	Crispiniano Limbaga y Villareal (Sr.)	1931-1942	Presidente Municipal / Municipal Mayor	Ricardo Teves y Regis (Sr.)	1935-1937	Municipal Vice Mayor	Frank Murphy	Commonwealth of the Philippines
6	Crispiniano Limbaga y Villareal (Sr.)	1931-1942	Presidente Municipal / Municipal Mayor	Miguel Díaz y Público	1937-1940	Municipal Vice Mayor	Frank Murphy	Commonwealth of the Philippines
6	Crispiniano Limbaga y Villareal (Sr.)	1931-1942	Presidente Municipal / Municipal Mayor	Miguel Díaz y Público	1937-1940	Municipal Vice Mayor	Paul V. McNutt	Commonwealth of the Philippines
6	Crispiniano Limbaga y Villareal (Sr.)	1931-1942	Presidente Municipal / Municipal Mayor	Miguel Díaz y Público	1937-1940	Municipal Vice Mayor	Francis Bowes Sayre Sr.	Commonwealth of the Philippines
6	Crispiniano Limbaga y Villareal (Sr.)	1931-1942	Presidente Municipal / Municipal Mayor	Graciano Banogon y Balaon (Sr.)	1940-1951	Municipal Vice Mayor	Francis Bowes Sayre Sr.	Commonwealth of the Philippines
--	Concejo Calumpang y Valencia de Martínez	1942	Municipal Mayor (acting)	Graciano Banogon y Balaon (Sr.)	1940-1951	Municipal Vice Mayor	Masaharu Homma	Japanese occupation of the Philippines
--	Concejo Calumpang y Valencia de Martínez	1942	Municipal Mayor (acting)	Graciano Banogon y Balaon (Sr.)	1940-1951	Municipal Vice Mayor	Shizuichi Tanaka	Japanese occupation of the Philippines
--	Perfecto Calumpang y Valencia	1942	Municipal Mayor (acting)	Graciano Banogon y Balaon (Sr.)	1940-1951	Municipal Vice Mayor	Shizuichi Tanaka	Japanese occupation of the Philippines
--	José María Emeterio Romero-Derecho y Muñoz	1943	Municipal Mayor (acting)	Graciano Banogon y Balaon (Sr.)	1940-1951	Municipal Vice Mayor	Shizuichi Tanaka	Japanese occupation of the Philippines
--	José María Emeterio Romero-Derecho y Muñoz	1943	Municipal Mayor (acting)	Graciano Banogon y Balaon (Sr.)	1940-1951	Municipal Vice Mayor	Shigenori Kuroda	Japanese occupation of the Philippines
7	Ricardo Teves y Regis (Sr.)	1942-1946	Municipal Mayor	Graciano Banogon y Balaon (Sr.)	1940-1951	Municipal Vice Mayor	Shigenori Kuroda	Japanese occupation of the Philippines
7	Ricardo Teves y Regis (Sr.)	1942-1946	Municipal Mayor	Graciano Banogon y Balaon (Sr.)	1940-1951	Municipal Vice Mayor	Tomoyuki Yamashita	Japanese occupation of the Philippines
7	Ricardo Teves y Regis (Sr.)	1942-1946	Municipal Mayor	Graciano Banogon y Balaon (Sr.)	1940-1951	Municipal Vice Mayor	Paul V. McNutt	Commonwealth of the Philippines
8	Baldomero Limbaga y Villareal (Sr.)	1946-1951	Municipal Mayor	Graciano Banogon y Balaon (Sr.)	1940-1951	Municipal Vice Mayor	Manuel Roxas	Third Republic of the Philippines
8	Baldomero Limbaga y Villareal (Sr.)	1946-1951	Municipal Mayor	Graciano Banogon y Balaon (Sr.)	1940-1951	Municipal Vice Mayor	Elpidio Quirino	Third Republic of the Philippines
9	Ricardo Teves y Regis (Sr.)	1952-1961	Municipal Mayor	Julio García (de Melgar) y Arnáiz (Sr.)	1952-1955	Municipal Vice Mayor	Elpidio Quirino	Third Republic of the Philippines
9	Ricardo Teves y Regis (Sr.)	1952-1961	Municipal Mayor	Julio García (de Melgar) y Arnáiz (Sr.)	1952-1955	Municipal Vice Mayor	Ramón Magsaysay	Third Republic of the Philippines
9	Ricardo Teves y Regis (Sr.)	1952-1961	Municipal Mayor	Fernando Ramón Canuto Calumpañg y Flores	1956-1959	Municipal Vice Mayor	Ramón Magsaysay	Third Republic of the Philippines
9	Ricardo Teves y Regis (Sr.)	1952-1961	Municipal Mayor	Fernando Ramón Canuto Calumpañg y Flores	1956-1959	Municipal Vice Mayor	Carlos García	Third Republic of the Philippines
9	Ricardo Teves y Regis (Sr.)	1952-1961	Municipal Mayor	Gaspar Villegas y Reyes	1960-1962	Municipal Vice Mayor	Carlos García	Third Republic of the Philippines
--	Julio García (de Melgar) y Arnaiz (Sr.)	1959	Municipal Mayor (acting)	Gaspar Villegas y Reyes	1960-1962	Municipal Vice Mayor	Diosdado Macapagal	Third Republic of the Philippines
--	Gaspar Villegas y Reyes	1962-1963	Municipal Mayor (acting)	(vacant)	1962-1963	Municipal Vice Mayor	Diosdado Macapagal	Third Republic of the Philippines
10	Ybarra Teves y Regis	1964-1980	Municipal Mayor	Ángel Mira y Aguilar	1964-1967	Municipal Vice Mayor	Diosdado Macapagal	Third Republic of the Philippines
10	Ybarra Teves y Regis	1964-1980	Municipal Mayor	Ángel Mira y Aguilar	1964-1967	Municipal Vice Mayor	Ferdinand Marcos	Third Republic of the Philippines
10	Ybarra Teves y Regis	1964-1980	Municipal Mayor	Crisóstomo Villegas y Colina	1967-1980	Municipal Vice Mayor	Ferdinand Marcos	Fourth Republic of the Philippines
11	Uldarico Ramirez y Cuevas (Sr.)	1980-1986	Municipal Mayor	Ángel Mira y Aguilar	1980-1986	Municipal Vice Mayor	Ferdinand Marcos	Fourth Republic of the Philippines
--	Rodulfo Navarro y Olis	1986-1987	Municipal Mayor (acting)	(vacant)	1986-1992	Municipal Vice Mayor	Corazón Cojuangco-Aquino	Fourth Republic of the Philippines
--	Arturo Regalado y Salma	1987	Municipal Mayor (acting)	(vacant)	1986-1992	Municipal Vice Mayor	Corazón Cojuangco-Aquino	Fifth Republic of the Philippines
--	Dominador Regalado y Salma (Jr.)	1987-1988	Municipal Mayor (acting)	(vacant)	1986-1992	Municipal Vice Mayor	Corazón Cojuangco-Aquino	Fifth Republic of the Philippines
12	Arturo Regalado y Salma	1988-1998	Municipal Mayor	(vacant)	1986-1992	Municipal Vice Mayor	Corazón Cojuangco-Aquino	Fifth Republic of the Philippines
12	Arturo Regalado y Salma	1988-1998	Municipal Mayor	Andres Gayo y Dael	1992-1995	Municipal Vice Mayor	Fidel Ramos	Fifth Republic of the Philippines
12	Arturo Regalado y Salma	1988-1998	Municipal Mayor	Jovencio Bumanglag y Simpliciano (Sr.)	1995-1998	Municipal Vice Mayor	Fidel Ramos	Fifth Republic of the Philippines
13	Baltazar Salma y Torres	1998-2001	Municipal Mayor	Lawrence Teves y Solís	1998-2001	Municipal Vice Mayor	Joseph Ejército-Estrada	Fifth Republic of the Philippines
13	Baltazar Salma y Torres	2001-2007	City Mayor	Lawrence Teves y Solís	2001-2007	City Vice Mayor	Gloria Macapagal-Arroyo	Fifth Republic of the Philippines
14	Lawrence Teves y Solis	2007-2016	City Mayor	Nilo Tam y Rosales	2007-2010	City Vice Mayor	Gloria Macapagal-Arroyo	Fifth Republic of the Philippines
14	Lawrence Teves y Solis	2007-2016	City Mayor	José Orlino y Torres	2010-2016	City Vice Mayor	Benigno Aquino III	Fifth Republic of the Philippines
15	Reynaldo Concepción	2016-2022	City Mayor	Lawrence Teves y Solis	2016-2019	City Vice Mayor (suspended)	Rodrigo Duterte	Fifth Republic of the Philippines
15	Reynaldo Concepción	2016-2022	City Mayor	Jovencio Bumanglag y Simpliciano (Sr.)	2016-2019	City Vice Mayor (acting)	Rodrigo Duterte	Fifth Republic of the Philippines
15	Reynaldo Concepción	2016-2022	City Mayor	Neil Salma y Teves	2019-2022	City Vice Mayor	Rodrigo Duterte	Fifth Republic of the Philippines
16	José Orlino y Torres	2022-2025	City Mayor	Neil Salma y Teves	2022-2025	City Vice Mayor	Ferdinand Marcos, Jr.	Fifth Republic of the Philippines

== Education ==
The public schools in Tanjay are administered by the Schools Division of Tanjay City.

=== High schools ===
- Azagra High School — Azagra
- Bahi-an High School — Bahi-an
- Domingo Ledesma Mapa High School (formerly Nagsala HS) — Sitio Nagsala, Sta. Cruz Viejo
- Lourdes Ledesma de del Prado Memorial National High School — Sta. Cruz Viejo
- Graciano Banogon High School — Sitio Camansi, Novallas
- Patricio Palomar Memorial High School — Sitio Ponglo, Sto. Niño
- Luca High School — Luca
- Namonbon High School — Sitio Namonbon, Pal-ew
- Pal-ew High School (formerly Lourdes L. del Prado MNHS - Pal-ew) — Pal-ew
- Polo High School (formerly Tanjay NHS - Polo) — Polo
- Rufino Aguilar Memorial High School (formerly Novallas HS) — Novallas
- San Miguel High School — San Miguel
- Santo Niño High School (formerly Lourdes L. de del Prado MNHS - Sto. Niño) — Sto. Niño
- Tanjay City Science High School — Calle Magallanes, Poblacion IX (Opao)
- Tanjay High School (Legislated) — Zamora Street, Catiaw-tiaw, Poblacion III
- Tanjay National High School — Calle Magallanes, Poblacion IX (Opao)

=== Private schools ===
- ABC Learning Center — Calzada del Progreso, Poblacion II
- Casa Marie Learning Institute — Pancil, Obogon
- Diaz College — Nono Limbaga Drive, Poblacion IX (Opao)
- Immaculate Heart Academy — Rizal Street, Poblacion II
- Villaflores College — Calle Legazpi, Poblacion VIII

== Notable personalities ==
- Chanda Romero - Philippine actress.
- Eddie Romero - National Artist of the Philippines for Cinema and Broadcast Arts.
- José Benito Atilano Joaquín Villegas y Teves - 70th Governor of Oriental Negros
- José María Emeterio Romero y Muñoz - Philippine (formerly American) statesman, and Philippine ambassador to the Court of St. James's
- José Emeterio Romero y Villanueva - Philippine diplomat.
- Julián Manuel Teves y Lajato - 72nd Governor of Oriental Negros
- Manuel Sagarbarría y Longa - 91st Governor of Oriental Negros
- Serafín Miguel Teves y Lajato - 79th Governor of Oriental Negros
- Emilio Yap - Philippine-Chinese businessman.
