= Eugene A. Gilmore House =

Historic house in Madison, Wisconsin

- Eugene A. Gilmore House "Airplane"
- U.S. National Register of Historic Places
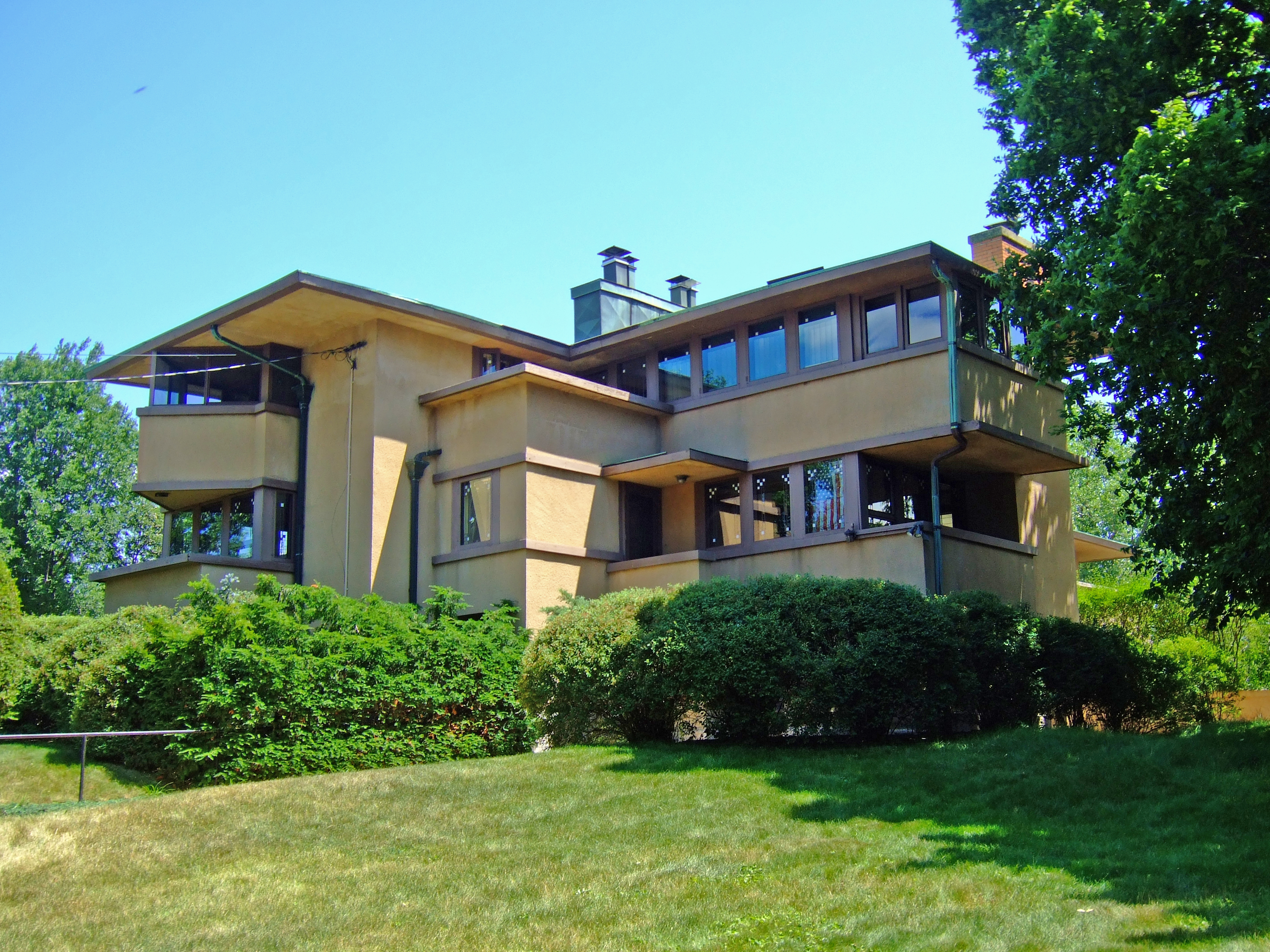

- Location within Wisconsin Location within the United States
- Location: 120 Ely Place, Madison, Wisconsin
- Coordinates: 43°4′14.91″N 89°25′7.54″W
- Built: 1908
- Architect: Frank Lloyd Wright
- Architectural style: Prairie School
- NRHP reference No.: 73000077
- Added to NRHP: March 14, 1973

The Eugene A. Gilmore House, also known as "Airplane" House, constructed in Madison, Wisconsin in 1908, is considered "a superb expression of Frank Lloyd Wright's mature Prairie style." The client, Eugene Allen Gilmore, served as a law professor at the nearby University of Wisconsin Law School. In 1973 the house was added to the National Register of Historic Places (NRHP).

== History ==
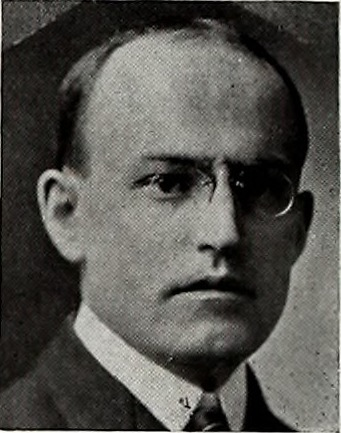
Eugene Gilmore

Eugene Gilmore was born on a farm in Brownville, Nebraska in 1871. He met Blanche Bayse while they both attended DePauw University, and they were married after he graduated from Harvard Law in 1899. In 1902 they moved to Madison where Eugene started at the UW Law School as an assistant professor.

Around 1908, Eugene and Blanche hired Frank Lloyd Wright to design them a home after seeing some of his designs in an issue of the magazine Architectural Record. By this time, Wright had been in the architectural design business for 20 years, starting as a draftsman completing designs for other architects in traditional styles, then becoming an independent architect and shifting from traditional styles to Prairie School. When the Gilmores hired Wright, he was a leading proponent of Prairie Style, and his version was mature, producing modern-looking, strongly horizontal buildings that fit the American landscape like sandstone outcrops.

The Gilmores had already bought a lot on a hillcrest a quarter mile west of Camp Randall, and Wright designed them a 2-story structure with a cross-shaped footprint. The design emphasizes the horizontal, with broad eaves, horizontal trim, banded windows, and a low pitched copper-clad hip roof that looks flat from most viewpoints. The exterior walls are stucco with wood trim. Ends of some of the wings are screened porches. From certain angles the whole thing does resemble an airplane – though not as much as before an addition at the main entrance. Inside, the basement originally contained the main entry, servant's quarters, and utility rooms. The first floor contained a living room, dining room, library, and a porch. The second floor contained four bedrooms and balconies. The Gilmores had given Wright a budget of $8,000, but construction costs ended up around $10,000. Wright himself visited the job site only three times and Eugene Gilmore ended up supervising construction.

As a professor at Madison, Eugene was active in the conservation movement, served as acting dean of the law school from 1912 to 1913, and served as president of the Association of American Law Schools. In 1922 he left to become vice-governor of the Philippines and the secretary of public instruction there. He also served as acting governor from 1927 to 1929. Back in the U.S. he served as dean of the college of law of the State University of Iowa and later president of that institution.

Around 1930 Nellie and Howard Weiss bought the Airplane House. They had the front entry modified and a three-car garage added in back, with design done by Law, Law & Potter. Howard was Treasurer of C.F. Burgess Laboratories, and founded Research Products Laboratory in 1939. After his death, Nellie lived there until 1981.

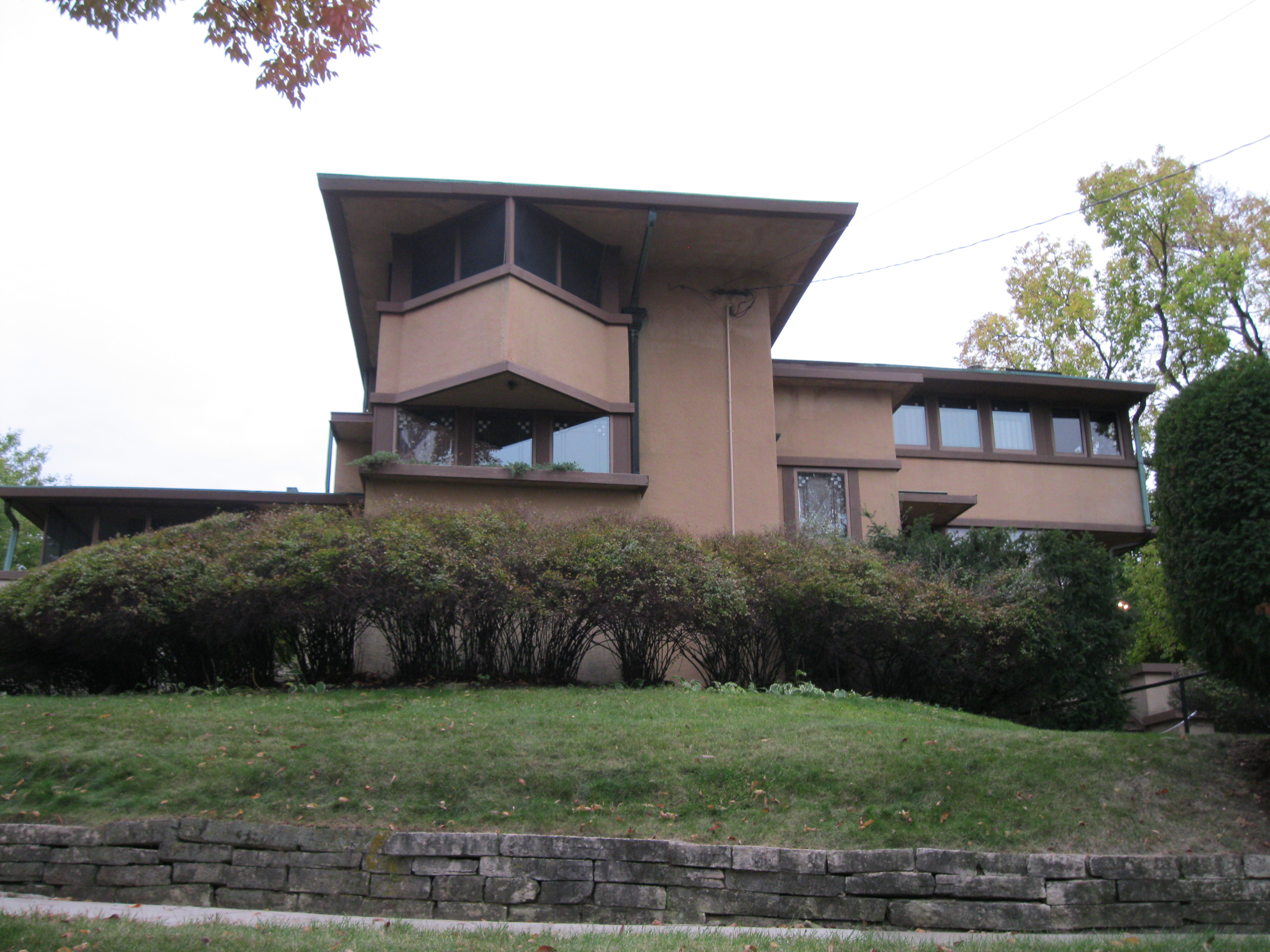
2014

The Airplane House was added to the NRHP in 1973. In its nomination, Gordon Orr wrote:

The Gilmore House represents an exemplary piece of architecture created by one of America's greatest architects. In acknowledging the great contribution that Wright has made to American architecture, one would also seek an example of his work in the city that was home and school to him for a portion of his life. Madison has several such works, but the Gilmore House stands as the finest example of Prairie architecture from his hand for many miles around. It must be recognized that the Gilmore House is a dual contribution to Madison's architectural heritage; it is an excellent example of Prairie architecture and it is an example of Frank Lloyd Wright's work.

The Airplane House is located within the University Heights Historic District, on Ely Place & Prospect Avenue, a short walk from other important architecture like Louis Sullivan's Bradley House, George Fred Keck's Morehouse House, and other designs by local architects.

== See also ==
- List of Frank Lloyd Wright works
- National Register of Historic Places listings in Madison, Wisconsin
