= Lourdes Quisumbing =

Filipina politician

40th Secretary of Education, Culture and Sports
- In office February 1987 – December 1989
- President: Corazon Aquino
- Preceded by: Jaime Laya
- Succeeded by: Isidro Cariño

Personal details
- Born: February 13, 1921 Cebu, Philippines
- Died: October 14, 2017 (aged 96) Cebu, Philippines
- Education: University of San Carlos

Lourdes Quisumbing (February 13, 1921 – October 14, 2017) served as the Philippines' Secretary of Education, Culture, and Sports from 1986 to 1989, under the presidency of Corazon Aquino. Prior to serving as Secretary, she was the president of Maryknoll College.

== Education ==
Quisumbing has studied extensively in the field of education, completing a Bachelor of Education from St. Theresa's College; a Master of Education from the University of San Carlos, and a Doctorate in Education from the University of Santo Tomas. She has held teaching and administrative positions at various schools, and was President of the Philippine Accrediting Association of Schools, Colleges and Universities (PAASCU).

== Secretary of Education ==
Quisumbing was recommended to President Aquino for the post of Secretary of Education, Culture, and Sports by Justice Cecilia Muñoz-Palma. Aquino had wanted more women in her cabinet, and the position was often filled by someone with a background in private Catholic education. Muñoz-Palma had served as a trustee of Maryknoll College where Quisumbing was president, and Aquino contacted Quisumbing after hearing her recommendation.

While President of Miriam (then Maryknoll) College, Quisumbing developed a curriculum of values education. As Secretary of Education, she attempted to implement this curriculum at the national level. Also of concern during Quisumbing's tenure as Secretary was the state of higher education in the Philippines. She made numerous statements regarding the need for accreditation and for more alignment between educational and national goals. To address these concerns she commissioned the Task Force to Study State Higher Education, which ultimately reported that many state colleges and universities were operating without planning and without a clear mission.

Quisumbing resigned as Secretary in December 1989, following the 1989 Philippine coup attempt, and was replaced by Isidro Cariño.

== Later life ==
After leaving the Department of Education, Quisumbing has remained active in education initiatives in the Philippines and abroad, especially with UNESCO. She is permanent representative to UNESCO for the Philippine government. She was the founder and first President of the UNESCO-Asia Pacific Network for International Education and Values Education (APNIEVE), and was a former Secretary-General of the UNESCO National Commission of the Philippines (1990 to 1998). She was chairperson emerita on the board of trustees for Miriam College. Quisumbing died on 14 October 2017 at the age of 96.
