= Tanjay Science High School =

Public high school in Negros Oriental, Philippines

Tanjay City Science High School

Location
- Opao, Barangay 9, Tanjay City
- 9°30′43″N 123°09′39″E

Information
- Other name: TSHS
- Former names: to: Tanjay Science High School; Tanjay City Science High School (present)
- Type: Public Science High School
- Motto: The step from zero to one belongs to God. (Gradus a nulla ad unum pertinet ad Deum)
- Established: 2003
- Status: Active
- Principal: Ma'am Nancy C. Colina (2017–2022), Sir Franklin L. Saycon (2022–2024) Edouard Cortez (2025-Present)
- Grades: 7 to 12
- Enrollment: 257 (school year 2012–2013)
- Colors: Pink and white
- Affiliation: Republic of the Philippines; Department of Education; Region VII; Schools Division of Tanjay City

Tanjay City Science High School (TCSHS) is a public high school located in Tanjay City, Negros Oriental, Philippines. It is a science high school recognized by the Department of Education.

== History ==
The school was established in 2003 on a different, smaller campus. Its first graduating class had 13 students. The following year, the school moved to its present-day campus. It adapted e-classroom applications with help from the Department of Education.

== Senior High programs ==
- STRAND & TRACK
  - STEM (Science, Technology, Engineering, Mathematics)

== Secondary programs ==
=== Senior high school ===
- Grade 11
- Grade 12

=== Junior high school ===
- Grade 7-10
