= Nicholas Roosevelt (diplomat) =

American diplomat and journalist (1893–1982)

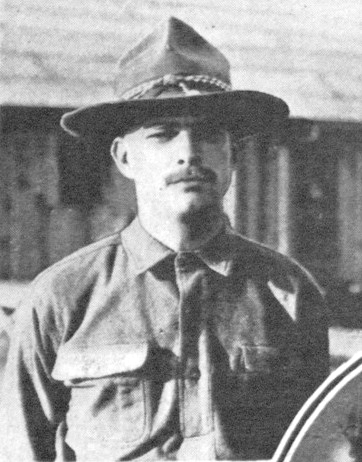
- Roosevelt during World War I

Vice Governor-General of the Philippines
- In office July 29, 1930 – September 24, 1930
- Preceded by: Eugene Allen Gilmore
- Succeeded by: George C. Butte

Philippine Secretary of Public Instruction
- In office July 29, 1930 – September 24, 1930
- Appointed by: Dwight F. Davis
- Preceded by: Eugene Allen Gilmore
- Succeeded by: George C. Butte

Personal details
- Born: June 12, 1893 New York City, U.S.
- Died: February 16, 1982 (aged 88) Monterey, California, U.S.
- Spouse: Tirzah Marts Gates (m. 1936)
- Education: Harvard University

Military service
- Branch/service: United States Army
- Battles/wars: World War I

Nicholas Roosevelt (June 12, 1893 – February 16, 1982) was an American diplomat and journalist.

== Early life ==
A member of the Roosevelt family and first-cousin once removed of U.S. President Theodore Roosevelt, he was born on June 12, 1893, in New York City to James West Roosevelt, a brother of Hilborne Roosevelt, and Laura Henrietta d'Oremieulx. Brought up in Oyster Bay, New York, he graduated from Harvard University in 1914.

== Career ==
He was an attaché at the American Embassy in Paris, secretary to the American mission to Spain in 1916 and 1917, and served in World War I.

He was vice-governor of the Philippine Islands in 1930, and U.S. minister to Hungary from 1930 to 1933. He was a member of the Council on Foreign Relations and a writer for its journal Foreign Affairs, and a foreign correspondent and editorial writer for the New York Times and New York Herald Tribune from 1921 to 1946.

A prolific author, his autobiography, A Front Row Seat (1953), offers a critical view of Franklin D. Roosevelt, a distant cousin, and an inside view of the New York Times. Theodore Roosevelt (1967) drew on Nicholas Roosevelt's unique childhood recollections, his father having been a close friend of Theodore.

== Personal life and death ==
On June 5, 1936, he married Tirzah Marts Gates, the daughter of California State Senator Egbert Gates. Her sister, Dorothy Gates, was the first wife of astrophysicist Fritz Zwicky. He remained lifelong friends with Fritz Zwicky. He lived in Big Sur, California, in his later life.

He died on February 16, 1982, in Monterey, California.

== Works ==
- The Philippines: A Treasure and a Problem (1926)
- The Restless Pacific (1928)
- America and England? (1930)
- The Townsend Plan: Taxing for Sixty (1936) (with Francis Everett Townsend)
- A New Birth of Freedom (1938)
- Wanted: Good Neighbors: The Need for Closer Ties with Latin America (1939)
- Venezuela's Place in the Sun: Modernizing a Pioneering Country (1940)
- A Front Row Seat (1953)
- Creative Cooking (1956)
- Good Cooking (1959)
- Theodore Roosevelt: The Man as I Knew Him (1967)
- Conservation: Now or Never (1970)
