= Diaz College =

Private college in Negros Oriental, Philippines

- Kolehiyo sa Diaz (Filipino)
- Other name: DC
- Former names: East Negros Institute (1947–1996); Diaz College (1997–present)
- Motto: Contendite Quaerite et Discite
- Motto in English: Strive Seek and Learn
- Type: Private, non-sectarian
- Established: 1947
- Founders: Miguel P. Diaz Sr. & Maria Arnaiz Diaz
- President: Rodrigo G. Diaz
- Director: Dr. Romulo T. Mirasol Jr.
- Students: 4,000+
- Location: Nono Limbaga Street, Tanjay City, Negros Oriental, Philippines; 9°30′48″N 123°09′43″E
- Campus: Nono Limbaga Street
- Colors: Green and White
- Nickname: Dcians
- Mascot: Hornets
- Website: diazcollege.net
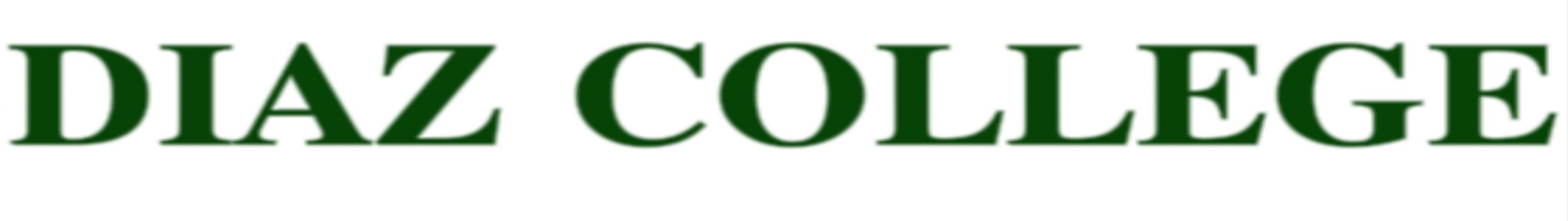

- Location in the Visayas Location in the Philippines

Diaz College (DC) is a private higher institution in Tanjay City, Negros Oriental, Philippines, founded in 1947. The school offers various academic programs and courses. It started as East Negros Institute (ENI) in 1947 and later changed its name to Diaz College.

== History ==
Established in 1947 as an elementary school under the name East Negros Institute, the institution has evolved over the years. Renamed Diaz College in 1997 to honor its founders, Don Miguel and Doña Maria "Iyay" Diaz, the school has steadily expanded its academic programs and enrollment. Its students are from Tanjay City and the surrounding areas of Negros.

Diaz College is a private liberal arts college known for its strong emphasis on critical thinking, interdisciplinary learning, and personalized attention to students. The college offers a wide range of undergraduate and graduate programs in the arts, sciences, business, education and technology. Diaz College prides itself on fostering a close-knit community, encouraging intellectual curiosity, and preparing students for successful careers and lifelong learning. The campus is known for its beautiful surroundings and modern facilities, providing an ideal environment for academic and personal growth. The school was granted a government permit in July 1947 to hold classes on a rented site, with 424 registered students, under the name of East Negros Institute (ENI). The groundbreaking for the school's site was held on October 11, 1947.

Diaz College acquired eight hectare site of Lawton Drive, Tanjay City. The legacy of the motto Strive-Seek-Learn has inscribed imprints in a number of professionals. On October 11, 1997, marked the Golden year of the institution.

=== School emblem ===
School seal

"For every member of the DCian community, the school emblem represents craftsmanship and dedication. Each symbol embodies the illustrious mission and vision of the school. The open book and illuminated torch signify the moral duty of the academic institution since its establishment in 1947, which is to educate every student to become a value-driven and service-oriented citizen. The DCian motto, inscribed as STRIVE-SEEK-LEARN, urges every member of the community to strive for justice, seek truth, and embrace moral virtues. The array of noble laurels symbolizes honor, distinguished achievements, and meritocracy in every endeavor undertaken by a DCian. The tree with radiating rings symbolizes the guardians of knowledge: the Mind to think, the Heart to feel, and the Hand to execute actions guided by the Truth."

Student publications

The Anahaw Publication is the official weekly student publication of the Diaz College system, one of the weekly student newspapers in the country. It is a publication by students from High School, Senior High School, and College Departments.

Administration

School President	School Director
Rodrigo G. Diaz (2024–present)	Dr. Romulo T. Mirasol Jr. (2024–present)

Gallery of Diaz College school buildings

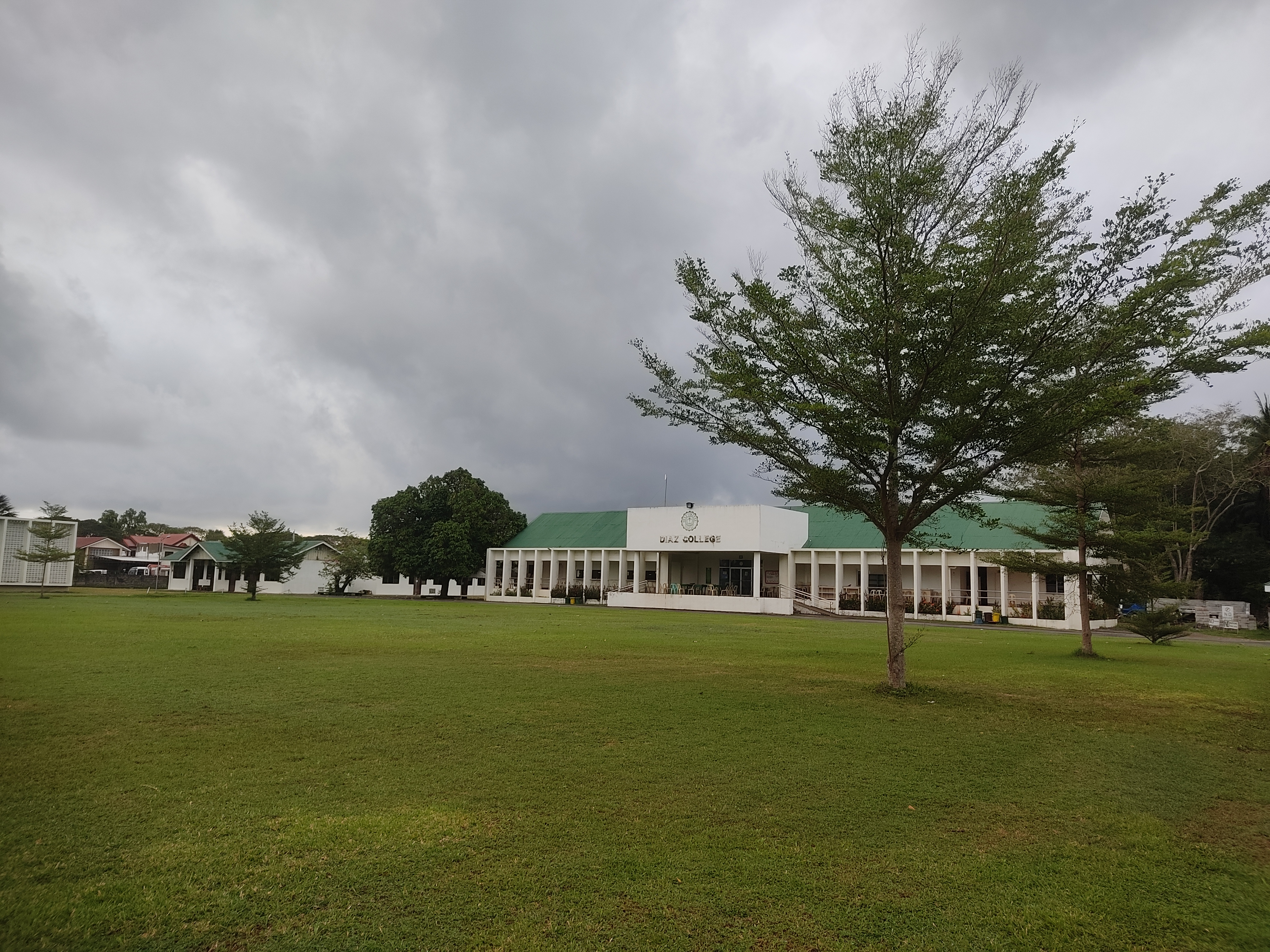
Diaz College registrar office building.

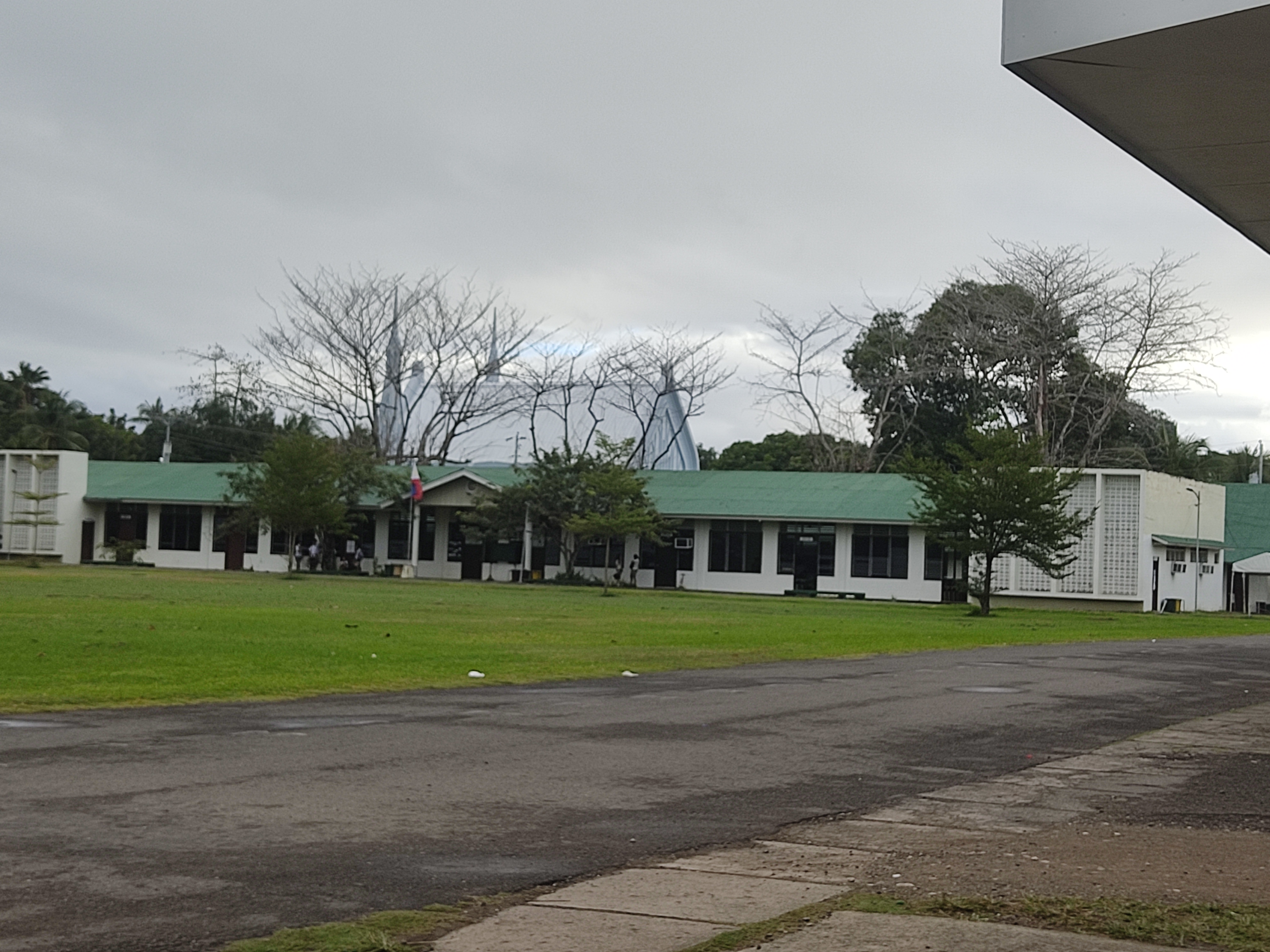
Diaz College school building Senior High and Junior Department.

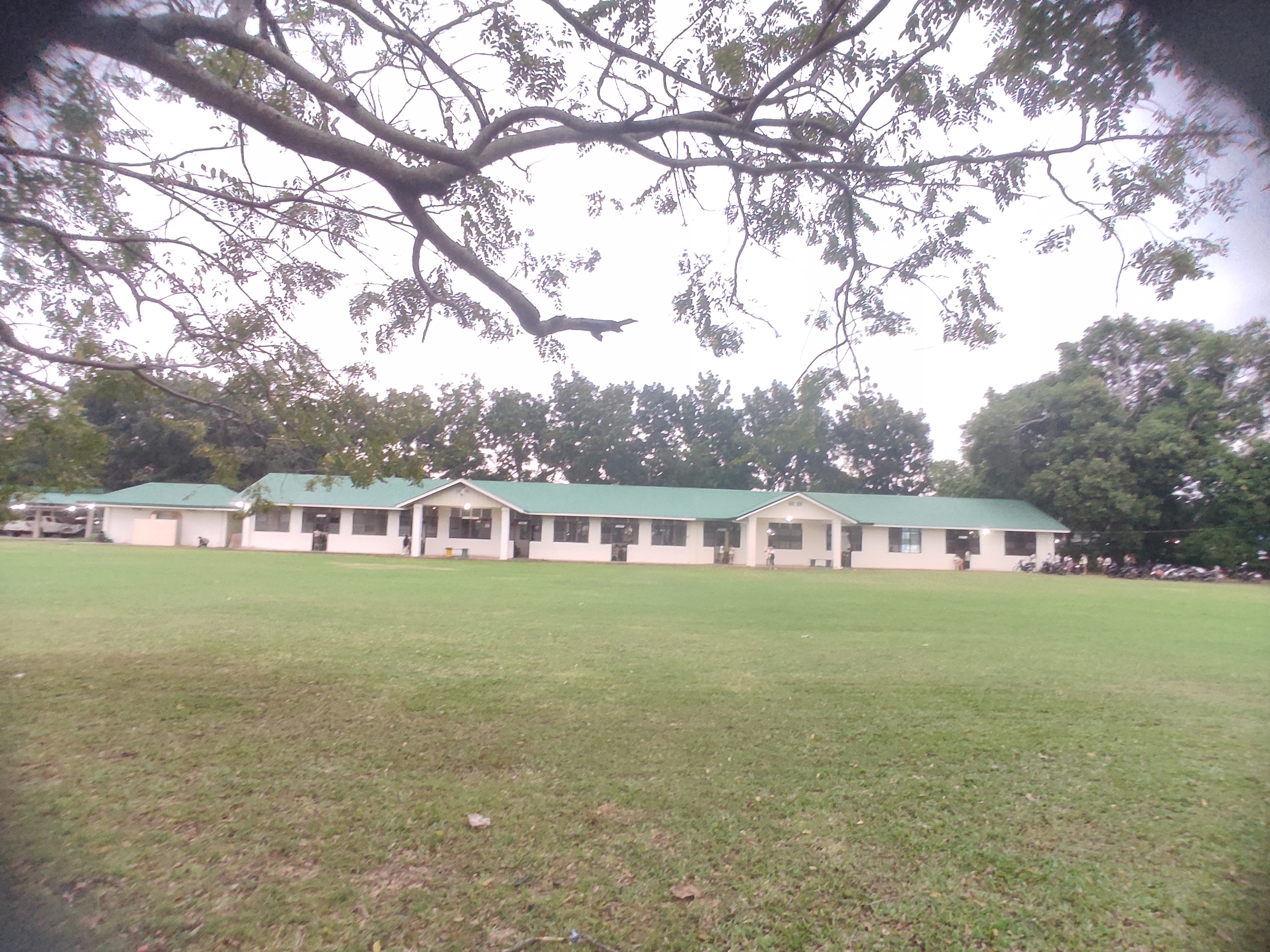
Diaz College school building of Commerce and Accountancy.

Gallery of Diaz College school facilities

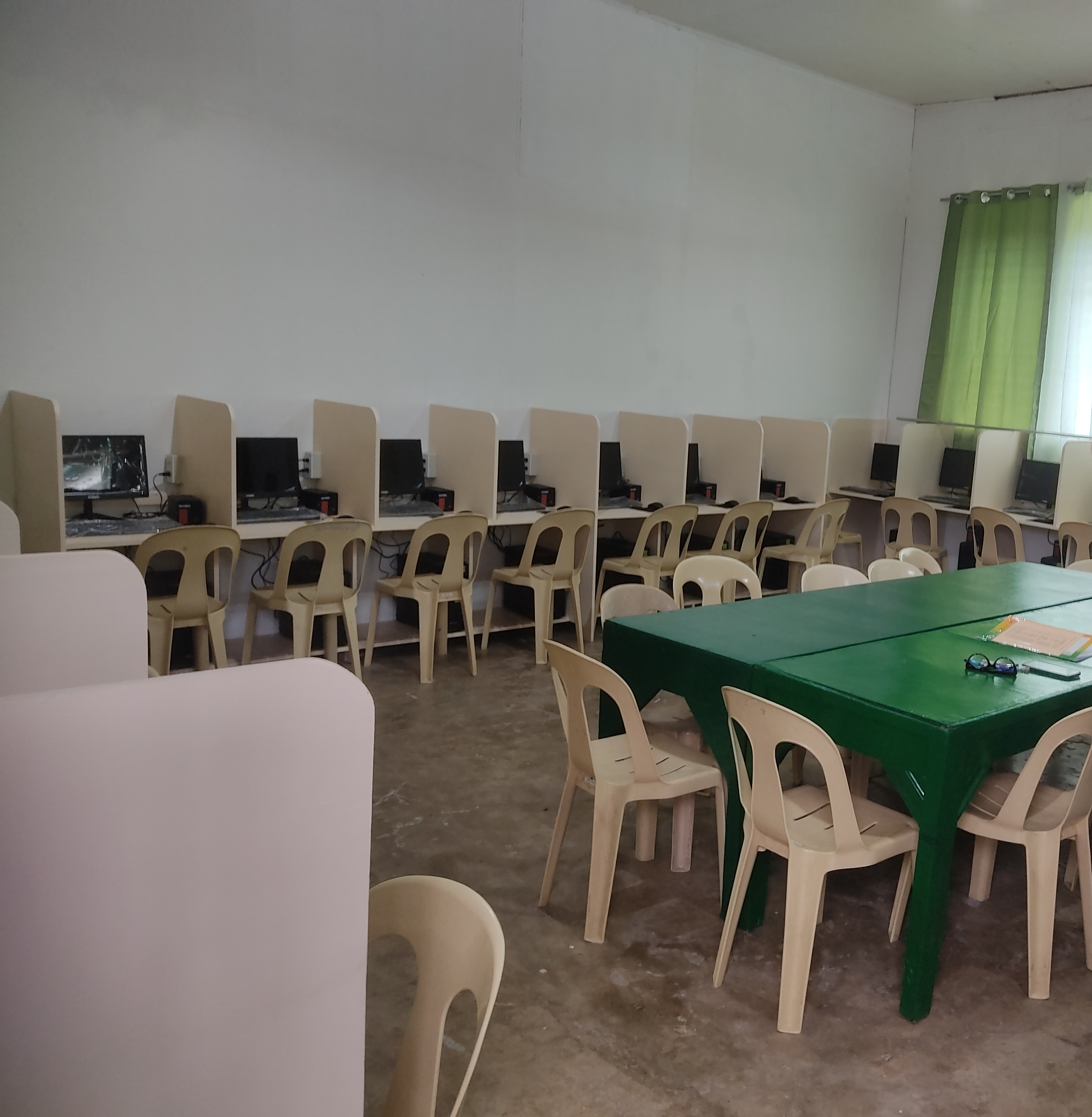
Diaz College Computer Laboratory.

== Academic programs ==
The Tanjay campus of Diaz College are composed of three colleges offering several undergraduate degrees and associate course that was accredited by the Commission on Higher Education (CHED).

Commission on Higher Education
(CHED) Philippines
National Centers of Development (COD)
College of Teacher Education
College of Business Administration
College of Information & Technology, Computer Science & Programming

=== College of Teacher Education ===
Bachelor of Elementary Education

Bachelor of Secondary Education

Major in:

- Filipino
- English
- Mathematics

=== College of Business Administration ===
Bachelor of Science in Business Administration

Major in:

- Business economics
- Financial management
- Marketing management
- Human Resource Development Management

=== College of Information & Technology, Computer Science & Programming ===
Bachelor of Science in Computer Science (BSCS)

Associate in Computer Technology (ACT)

== Primary programs ==
The school also offered primary programs, such as basic education for Junior High School students in Grades 7 to 10 (formerly known as 1st to 4th Year High School).

Basic education

- Junior High School
  - Grade 7–10
- Senior High School
  - Grade 11–12

== Senior high programs ==
The Senior High School was added in the 2016-2017 school year and offers Academic, Technical-Vocational-Livelihood (TVL), Arts and Design, and Sports tracks. Each track includes various strands, namely: Humanities and Social Sciences (HUMSS), Science, Technology, Engineering, and Mathematics (STEM), Accountancy, Business, and Management (ABM), General Academic Strand (GAS), Information and Communication Technology (ICT), Sports, and different TVL specializations. Both JHS and SHS offer the Open High School Program to expand access to basic education.

- Strand
  - STEM (Science, Technology, Engineering, Mathematics)
  - GAS (General Academic Strand)
  - HUMMS (Humanities and Social Sciences)
  - ABM (Accountancy, Business, Management)
  - ICT (Information Communication and Technology) or ICT Strand

== Notable people ==
- José T. Orlino (IND) – Acting mayor in Tanjay City, province of Negros Oriental, region NIR, Philippines.
