= Secretary of Education (Philippines) =

Cabinet member

- Kalihim ng Edukasyon
- Official seal of the Department of Education

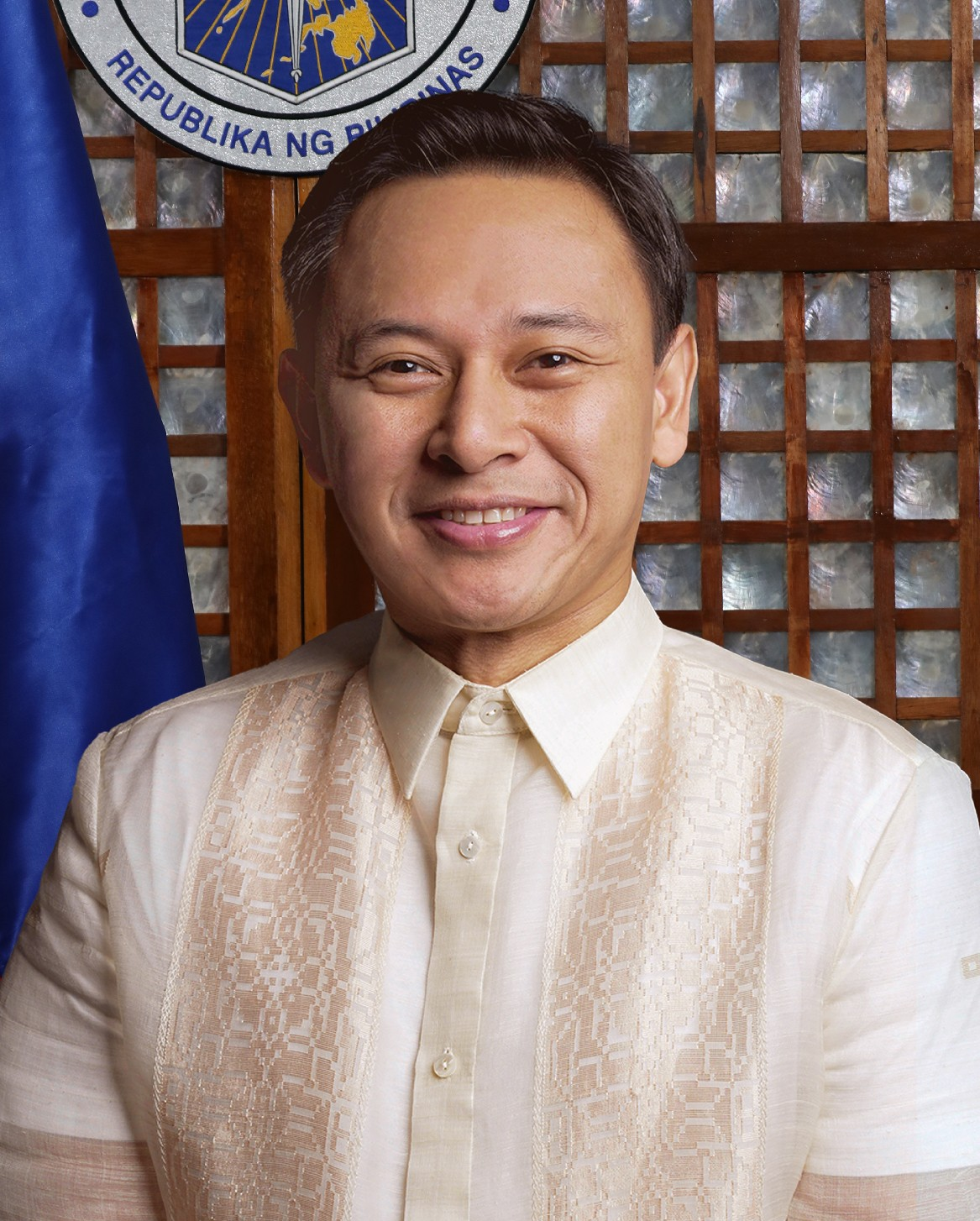
- Incumbent; Sonny Angara since July 19, 2024
- Style: The Honorable
- Member of: Cabinet
- Appointer: The president
- Term length: Coterminous with the president
- Inaugural holder: Felipe Buencamino
- Formation: June 23, 1898
- Website: www.deped.gov.ph

The Secretary of Education (Filipino: Kalihim ng Edukasyon) is a member of the Cabinet of the Philippines in charge of the Department of Education (DepEd).

The current secretary is Sonny Angara, who was sworn in on July 19, 2024.

== Powers, duties, and functions ==
Under the 1987 Philippine Constitution, the secretary exercises supervision and control over the entire department and performs the following functions:

- Advises the president on matters related to education.
- Establishes the policies and standards for the operation of the department pursuant to the approved programs of the government.
- Promulgates rules and regulations necessary to carry out the objectives, policies, functions, plans, programs, and projects of the department.
- Promulgates issuances necessary for the efficient administration of the offices under him and the proper implementations of laws relative to education.
- Exercises disciplinary powers over officials and employees in accordance with existing laws.
- Formulates and enforces a management control system to measure and evaluate the performance of the department and submits periodic reports to the President.
- Prepares and submits to the president through the Department of Budget and Management the budget of the department.
- Appoints all officers and employees of the department except those whose appointment is vested in the president.

== List ==
=== Secretary of Public Development (1898–1899) ===
Portrait	Name	Took office	Left office	President
	Felipe Buencamino (1848−1929)	September 26, 1898	January 21, 1899	Emilio Aguinaldo

=== Secretary of Welfare (1899) ===
Portrait	Name	Took office	Left office	President
	Gracio Gonzaga	January 21, 1899	May 7, 1899	Emilio Aguinaldo
	Aguedo Velarde	May 7, 1899	November 13, 1899	Emilio Aguinaldo

=== Secretary of Public Instruction (1901–1935) ===
Portrait	Name	Took office	Left office	Governor-General
	Bernard Moses (1846−1930)	September 1, 1901	December 31, 1902	William Howard Taft
	James Francis Smith (1859−1928)	January 1, 1902	September 20, 1906	William Howard Taft
	James Francis Smith (1859−1928)	January 1, 1902	September 20, 1906	Luke Edward Wright
	James Francis Smith (1859−1928)	January 1, 1902	September 20, 1906	Henry Clay Ide
	William Morgan Shuster (1877−1960)	September 28, 1906	March 1, 1909	James Francis Smith
	Newton W. Gilbert (1862−1939)	March 1, 1909	December 1, 1913	James Francis Smith
	Newton W. Gilbert (1862−1939)	March 1, 1909	December 1, 1913	William Cameron Forbes
	Newton W. Gilbert (1862−1939)	March 1, 1909	December 1, 1913	Newton W. Gilbert
	Newton W. Gilbert (1862−1939)	March 1, 1909	December 1, 1913	Francis Burton Harrison
	Henderson S. Martin	December 1, 1913	June 28, 1917	Francis Burton Harrison
	Charles Yeater (1861−1943)	June 29, 1917	January 25, 1922	Francis Burton Harrison
	Charles Yeater (1861−1943)	June 29, 1917	January 25, 1922	Charles Yeater
	Charles Yeater (1861−1943)	June 29, 1917	January 25, 1922	Leonard Wood
	Eugene Allen Gilmore (1871−1953)	January 26, 1922	June 20, 1930	Leonard Wood
	Eugene Allen Gilmore (1871−1953)	January 26, 1922	June 20, 1930	Eugene Allen Gilmore
	Eugene Allen Gilmore (1871−1953)	January 26, 1922	June 20, 1930	Henry L. Stimson
	Eugene Allen Gilmore (1871−1953)	January 26, 1922	June 20, 1930	Eugene Allen Gilmore
	Eugene Allen Gilmore (1871−1953)	January 26, 1922	June 20, 1930	Dwight F. Davis
	Nicholas Roosevelt (1893−1982); Interim	July 29, 1930	September 24, 1930	Dwight F. Davis
	George C. Butte (1877−1940)	December 31, 1930	June 30, 1932	Dwight F. Davis
	George C. Butte (1877−1940)	December 31, 1930	June 30, 1932	George C. Butte
	George C. Butte (1877−1940)	December 31, 1930	June 30, 1932	Theodore Roosevelt Jr.
	John H. Holliday	August 13, 1932	September 1, 1933	Theodore Roosevelt Jr.
	John H. Holliday	August 13, 1932	September 1, 1933	Frank Murphy
	Joseph R. Hayden (1887−1945)	November 7, 1933	November 15, 1935	Frank Murphy

=== Secretary of Public Instruction (1935–1941) ===
Portrait	Name	Took office	Left office	President
	Sergio Osmeña (Note: In concurrent capacity as the Vice President.) (1878−1961)	November 15, 1935	December 1, 1938	Manuel L. Quezon
	Manuel L. Quezon (Note: In concurrent capacity as the President.) (1878−1944)	December 1, 1938	April 19, 1939	Manuel L. Quezon
	Jorge Bocobo (1886−1965)	April 19, 1939	December 24, 1941	Manuel L. Quezon

=== Secretary of Public Instruction, Health and Welfare (1941–1944) ===
President Manuel L. Quezon issued Executive Order No. 396 on December 24, 1941, reorganizing the Department of Public Instruction as the Department of Public Instruction, Health and Welfare.

Portrait	Name	Took office	Left office	President
	Sergio Osmeña (1878−1961)	December 24, 1941	August 1, 1944	Manuel L. Quezon

=== Commissioner of Education, Health and Welfare (1942–1943) ===
Portrait	Name	Took office	Left office	Chairman of the Philippine Executive Commission
	Claro M. Recto (1890−1960)	January 26, 1942	October 14, 1943	Jorge B. Vargas

=== Secretary of Information and Public Relations (1943–1945) ===
Portrait	Name	Took office	Left office	President
	Carlos P. Romulo (1899−1985)	October 11, 1944	February 27, 1945	Manuel L. Quezon
	Carlos P. Romulo (1899−1985)	October 11, 1944	February 27, 1945	Sergio Osmeña

=== Minister of Education, Health and Public Welfare (1943–1944) ===
Portrait	Name	Took office	Left office	President
	Gabriel Mañalac; Acting	October 20, 1943	January 1, 1944	Jose P. Laurel

=== Minister of Education (1944–1945) ===
President Jose P. Laurel issued Executive Order No. 24 on December 31, 1943, creating the Ministry of Education from the Ministry of Education, Health, and Public Welfare as of January 1, 1944.

Portrait	Name	Took office	Left office	President
	Camilo Osías (1889−1976)	May 18, 1944	February 27, 1945	Jose P. Laurel

=== Secretary of Instruction and Information (1945–1947) ===
President Sergio Osmeña issued Executive Order No. 27 on February 27, 1945, abolishing the Department of Information and Public Relations and creating the Department of Instruction and Information.

Portrait	Name	Took office	Left office	President
	Carlos P. Romulo (1899−1985)	February 27, 1945	March 8, 1945	Sergio Osmeña
	Maximo Kalaw (1891−1954)	March 8, 1945	May 4, 1945	Sergio Osmeña
	Jose Reyes	May 5, 1945	January 3, 1946	Sergio Osmeña
	Francisco Benitez	January 3, 1946	May 27, 1946	Sergio Osmeña
	Manuel Gallego	May 28, 1946	October 4, 1947	Manuel Roxas

=== Secretary of Education (1947–1972) ===
President Manuel Roxas issued Executive Order No. 94 on October 4, 1947, reorganizing the Department of Instruction and Information as the Department of Education as of July 1, 1947.

Portrait	Name	Took office	Left office	President
	Manuel Gallego	October 4, 1947	September 20, 1948	Manuel Roxas
	Manuel Gallego	October 4, 1947	September 20, 1948	Elpidio Quirino
	Prudencio Langcauon	September 21, 1948	September 13, 1950	Elpidio Quirino
	Pablo Lorenzo	September 14, 1950	April 3, 1951	Elpidio Quirino
	Teodoro Evangelista	May 18, 1951	September 30, 1951	Elpidio Quirino
	Cecilio Putong (1891−1980)	April 18, 1952	January 13, 1954	Elpidio Quirino
	Cecilio Putong (1891−1980)	April 18, 1952	January 13, 1954	Ramon Magsaysay
	Pastor Endencia	January 13, 1954	June 30, 1954	Ramon Magsaysay
	Gregorio Hernandez Jr.	July 1, 1954	March 17, 1957	Ramon Magsaysay
	Martin Aguilar Jr.	March 18, 1957	September 2, 1957	Carlos P. Garcia
	Manuel Lim	September 3, 1957	November 17, 1957	Carlos P. Garcia
	Daniel Salcedo	November 18, 1957	May 31, 1959	Carlos P. Garcia
	José E. Romero (1897−1978)	June 1, 1959	September 4, 1962	Carlos P. Garcia
	José E. Romero (1897−1978)	June 1, 1959	September 4, 1962	Diosdado Macapagal
	Jose Tuason	September 5, 1962	December 30, 1962	Diosdado Macapagal
	Alejandro Roces (1924−2011)	December 30, 1962	September 7, 1965	Diosdado Macapagal
	Carlos P. Romulo (1899−1985)	December 30, 1965	December 16, 1967	Ferdinand Marcos
	Onofre Corpuz (1926−2013)	December 17, 1967	April 20, 1971	Ferdinand Marcos
	Juan Manuel	April 21, 1971	September 23, 1972	Ferdinand Marcos

=== Secretary of Education and Culture (1972–1978) ===
Portrait	Name	Took office	Left office	President
	Juan Manuel	September 23, 1972	June 2, 1978	Ferdinand Marcos

=== Minister of Education and Culture (1978–1982) ===
President Ferdinand Marcos issued Presidential Decree No. 1397 on June 2, 1978, converting all departments into ministries headed by ministers.

Portrait	Name	Took office	Left office	President
	Juan Manuel	June 2, 1978	June; 1979	Ferdinand Marcos
	Onofre Corpuz (1926−2013)	July; 1979	September 10, 1982	Ferdinand Marcos

=== Minister of Education, Culture and Sports (1982–1987) ===
Portrait	Name	Took office	Left office	President
	Onofre Corpuz (1926−2013)	September 11, 1982	January 18, 1984	Ferdinand Marcos
	Jaime C. Laya (born 1939)	January 18, 1984	February 25, 1986	Ferdinand Marcos
	Lourdes Quisumbing (1921−2017)	February 25, 1986	February 11, 1987	Corazon Aquino

=== Secretary of Education, Culture, and Sports (1987–2001) ===
President Corazon Aquino issued Administrative Order No. 15 on February 11, 1987, converting all ministries into departments headed by secretaries.

Portrait	Name	Took office	Left office	President
	Lourdes Quisumbing (1921−2017)	February 11, 1987	December; 1989	Corazon Aquino
	Isidro Cariño	January 3, 1990	June 30, 1992	Corazon Aquino
	Armand Fabella (1930−2008)	July 1, 1992	July 6, 1994	Fidel V. Ramos
	Ricardo Gloria (1940–2006)	July 7, 1994	December; 1997	Fidel V. Ramos
	Erlinda Pefianco	February 2, 1998	June 30, 1998	Fidel V. Ramos
	Andrew Gonzalez (1940−2006)	July 1, 1998	January 22, 2001	Joseph Estrada
	Andrew Gonzalez (1940−2006)	July 1, 1998	January 22, 2001	Gloria Macapagal Arroyo
	Raul Roco (1941–2005)	January 22, 2001	August 10, 2001	Gloria Macapagal Arroyo

=== Secretary of Education (from 2001) ===
Portrait	Name	Took office	Left office	President
	Raul Roco (1941–2005)	August 11, 2001	August 31, 2002	Gloria Macapagal Arroyo
	Edilberto de Jesus	September 16, 2002	August; 2004	Gloria Macapagal Arroyo
	Florencio Abad (born 1954)	September 23, 2004	July 8, 2005	Gloria Macapagal Arroyo
	Ramon Bacani; Officer in Charge	July 8, 2005	August 30, 2005	Gloria Macapagal Arroyo
	Fe Hidalgo; Officer in Charge	August 31, 2005	October 3, 2006	Gloria Macapagal Arroyo
	Jesli Lapus (born 1949)	October 4, 2006	March 15, 2010	Gloria Macapagal Arroyo
	Mona Valisno (1932–2026)	March 15, 2010	June 30, 2010	Gloria Macapagal Arroyo
	Armin Luistro (born 1961)	June 30, 2010	June 30, 2016	Benigno Aquino III
	Leonor Briones (born 1940)	June 30, 2016	June 30, 2022	Rodrigo Duterte
	Sara Duterte (born 1978)	June 30, 2022	July 19, 2024	Bongbong Marcos
	Sonny Angara (born 1972)	July 19, 2024	Incumbent	Bongbong Marcos
