= Chester Arthur Phillips =

Chester Arthur Phillips (July 17, 1882 – December 1, 1976) was an economist and acting President of the University of Iowa, serving in 1940. Phillips Hall at the university is named for him.

Academic offices
Preceded by Eugene Allen Gilmore	Acting President of the University of Iowa; 1940	Succeeded by Virgil Melvin Hancher
