= Virgil Melvin Hancher =

American educator (1896–1965)

- Born: September 4, 1896 near Rolfe, Iowa, U.S.
- Died: January 30, 1965 (aged 68); New Delhi, India
- Resting place: Oakland Cemetery; Iowa City, Iowa, U.S.
- Education: University of Iowa (BA, JD); University of Oxford (BA, MA)
- Occupations: Educator; lawyer
- Spouse: Susan Jane Cannon (m. 1928)
- Children: 3

Virgil Melvin Hancher (September 4, 1896 – January 30, 1965) was the thirteenth president of the University of Iowa, serving from 1940 to 1964. Hancher Auditorium at the university was named for him.

== Early life ==
Virgil M. Hancher was born on September 4, 1896, near Rolfe, Iowa, to Melvin Park Hancher. He attended Rolfe High School. He graduated from the University of Iowa with a B.A. in 1918 and later graduated with a J.D. at the University of Iowa College of Law in 1924. He was senior class president of the class of 1918. Between degrees, he served a year in the United States Navy Reserve. He was admitted to the bar in 1925. In 1920, he was selected as a Rhodes Scholar and received a B.A. in jurisprudence from the University of Oxford in 1922. In 1927, he graduated with a M.A. degree from Oxford.

== Career ==
Hancher worked 15 years as a lawyer in Chicago. He specialized in corporate law and became a partner at Pope and Ballard in Chicago in 1936.

On September 10, 1940, Hancher became the 13th president of the University of Iowa. He retired on June 30, 1964. At the time of his retirement, he had served as president for 24 years and was the longest serving president of the college. During his presidency, student enrollment at the University of Iowa went from 6,600 to 13,000 students and the faculty went from 300 to 700. Prior to serving as president, he was president of the University of Iowa alumni association for two years.

Hancher was a member of the University Club of Washington, DC, the University Club of New York, Western University Club of New York, University Club of Chicago, Century Association, American Association for the Advancement of Science and the American Association of School Administrators. He was president of the State Universities Association, the National Association of State Universities and the Association of American Universities. He was chairman of the American Council of Education and the Educational Policies Commission of the National Education Association.

In 1949, Hancher was a delegate of the American Universities to a conference on Indian-American affairs in New Delhi. In 1959, Hancher was a member of the United States delegation to the United Nations General Assembly. In 1952, he was appointed a member of the United States National Commission for UNESCO. From 1953 to 1958, he was a member of the board of the Religious Education Association of the U.S. and Canada. In 1954, he was appointed a member of the selection committee for the recommendation of the site of the Air Force Academy by President Dwight Eisenhower and was a member on the first board of visitors of the academy. Eisenhower also appointed Hancher in 1956 to a committee to prepare a history on the United States Supreme Court as a memorial to Oliver Wendell Holmes Jr. In August 1964, he went to India for a two-year post as a consultant in higher education for the Ford Foundation. He remained there until his death. He had planned in 1966 to return to the University of Iowa as a law professor and educational consultant.

== Personal life ==
Hancher married Susan Jane Cannon on June 9, 1928. They had two daughters and son, Priscilla, Mrs. Richard Hokmuth and Virgil Jr. He was a 33rd degree Mason and a member of the Episcopal Church.

Hancher had a heart attack in 1957. He died following a heart attack on January 30, 1965, at a hospital in New Delhi, India. He was buried at Oakland Cemetery in Iowa City.

== Awards and honors ==
Hancher had honorary degrees from 13 institutions, including Northwestern University, the University of Southern California, the University of Florida, Michigan State University and Montana State University. On June 30, 1964, he received an honorary degree of Doctor of Laws from the University of Iowa. He received an honorary degree from St. Ambrose University. He received the George Washington Honor Medal of the Freedoms Foundation for articles he wrote.

In 1969, a new auditorium called the Virgil M. Hancher Auditorium was named after Hancher at the University of Iowa.

Academic offices
Preceded by Chester Arthur Phillips (acting); Eugene Allen Gilmore	President of the University of Iowa; 1940–1964	Succeeded by Howard Rothmann Bowen
