= Eugene Allen Gilmore =

American politician and academic administrator (1871–1953)

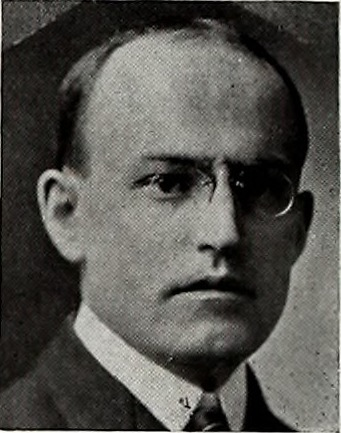
- Eugene Allen Gilmore

Acting Governor-General of the Philippines
- In office February 23, 1929 – July 8, 1929
- Preceded by: Henry L. Stimson
- Succeeded by: Dwight F. Davis
- In office August 7, 1927 – December 27, 1927
- Preceded by: Leonard Wood
- Succeeded by: Henry L. Stimson

Vice Governor-General of the Philippines
- In office January 26, 1922 – June 20, 1930
- Preceded by: Charles Yeater
- Succeeded by: Nicholas Roosevelt

10th Philippine Secretary of Public Instruction
- In office January 26, 1922 – June 20, 1930
- Appointed by: Leonard Wood
- Preceded by: Charles Yeater
- Succeeded by: Nicholas Roosevelt

Personal details
- Born: July 4, 1871 Brownville, Nebraska
- Died: November 4, 1953 (aged 82) Iowa City, Iowa
- Spouse: Blanche Bayse (m. 1899)

Eugene Allen Gilmore (July 4, 1871 – November 4, 1953) was Vice Governor-General of the Philippine Islands from 1922 to 1929, serving twice as acting Governor-General of the Philippines in 1927 and again in 1929. He also held positions as the Dean of the College of Law at the University of Iowa from 1930 to 1934, the twelfth President of the University of Iowa from 1934 to 1940, and the law dean at the University of Pittsburgh School of Law from 1940 to 1942.

== Biography ==
Gilmore was born in Brownville, Nebraska to Andrew Gilmore and Sarah Jane Allen Hall. He received his B.A. degree from DePauw University in 1893, and his LL.B. from Harvard in 1899. He married Blanche Bayse of Rockport, Indiana on December 27, 1899. After practicing law in Boston, Massachusetts from 1899 to 1902, Gilmore served as faculty at the University of Wisconsin Law School from 1902 to 1922. While in Madison, he commissioned Frank Lloyd Wright to design a home, the Eugene A. Gilmore House. He was the Vice Governor-General of the Philippine Islands from 1922 to 1929. He became dean of the University of Iowa College of Law in 1930, then as the president of the university from 1934 to 1940.

Gilmore died of a heart attack at his home in Iowa City, Iowa on November 4, 1953.

== Legacy ==
Gilmore Avenue, Quezon City, a major thoroughfare in the Metro Manila, is named after him, in turn lending its name to Gilmore station, an urban mass transit station located near the avenue. Gilmore Hall at the University of Iowa is named for him.

== See also ==
- Eugene A. Gilmore House

Government offices
Preceded by Leonard Wood	Acting Governor-General of the Philippines; 1927	Succeeded by Henry L. Stimson
Preceded by Henry L. Stimson	Acting Governor-General of the Philippines; 1929	Succeeded by Dwight F. Davis
Academic offices
Preceded by Walter Albert Jessup	President of the University of Iowa; 1934–1940	Succeeded by Chester Arthur Phillips (acting); Virgil Melvin Hancher
