= Charles Yeater =

American politician

Charles Emmett Yeater
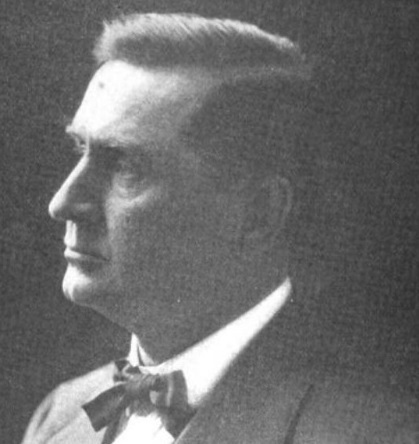

Acting Governor-General of the Philippines
- In office March 5, 1921 – October 14, 1921
- Preceded by: Francis Burton Harrison
- Succeeded by: Leonard Wood

Vice Governor-General of the Philippines
- In office June 29, 1917 – January 25, 1922
- Preceded by: Henderson S. Martin
- Succeeded by: Eugene Allen Gilmore

9th Philippine Secretary of Public Instruction
- In office June 29, 1917 – January 25, 1922
- Appointed by: Francis Burton Harrison
- Preceded by: Henderson S. Martin
- Succeeded by: Eugene Allen Gilmore

Personal details
- Born: Francis Burton Harrison; April 24, 1861; Sedalia, Missouri, U.S.
- Died: July 20, 1943 (aged 82); Sedalia, Missouri, U.S.

Charles Emmett Yeater (April 24, 1861 – July 20, 1943) of Sedalia, Missouri was acting Governor-General of the Philippines from March 5, 1921 to October 14, 1921.

From 1901 to 1935, the governor-general was the chief political executive of the Philippines, when the country was governed by the United States of America.

The Charles E. Yeater Learning Center at State Fair Community College in Sedalia is named for him.

He served as Democratic member of the Missouri Senate in 1892, and was a supporter of the legislation to move the Missouri State Capital from Jefferson City to Sedalia, which failed in the popular vote.

He is buried at Crown Hill Cemetery, Sedalia, Missouri.

| Preceded by Francis Burton Harrison | Acting Governor-General of the Philippines; 1921 | Succeeded by Leonard Wood |
