= George C. Butte =

Associate Justice of the Supreme Court of the Philippines

George Butte
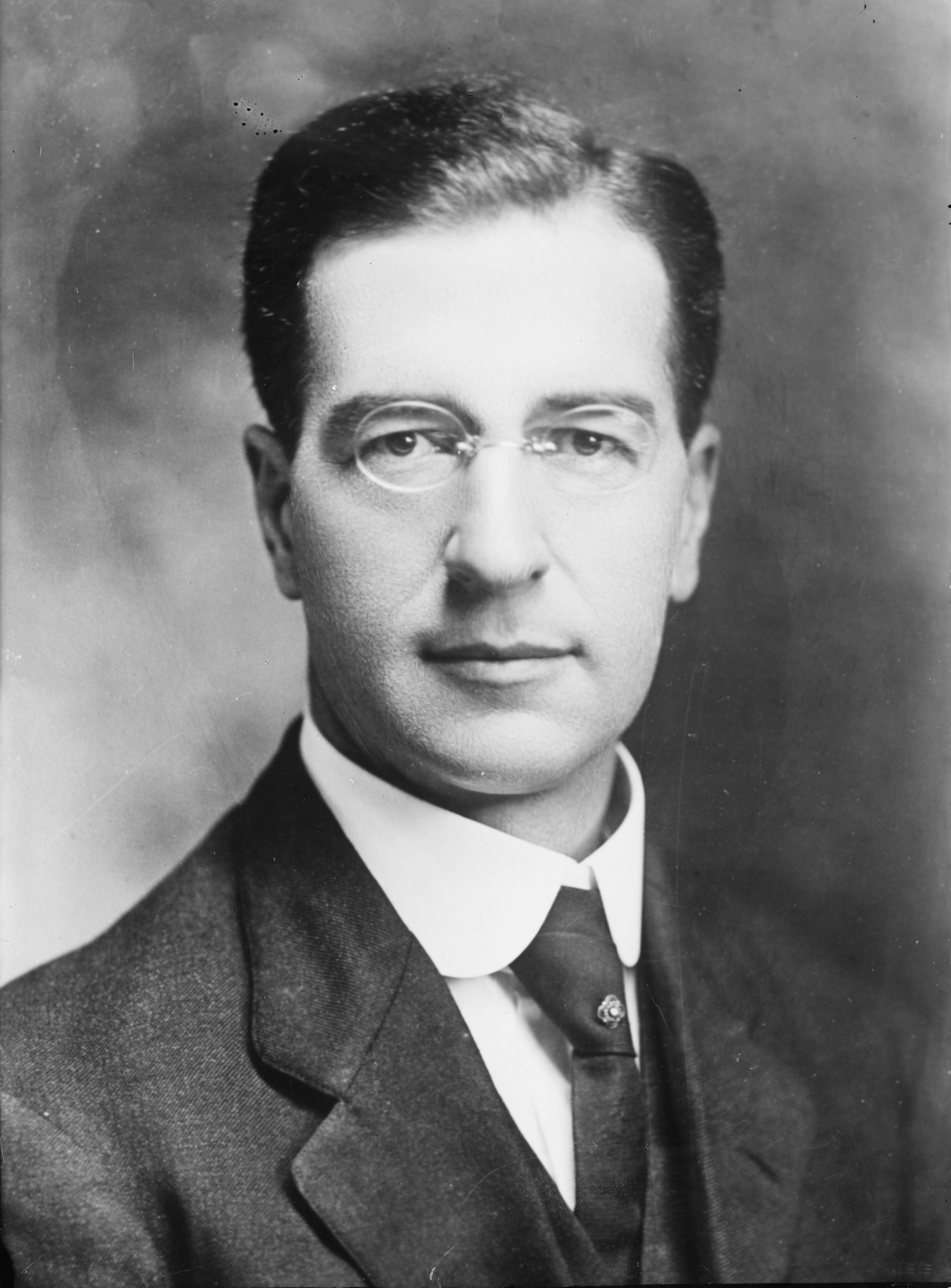

Associate Justice of the Supreme Court of the Philippines
- In office July 1, 1932 – October 31, 1936
- Appointed by: Herbert Hoover
- Preceded by: James A. Ostrand
- Succeeded by: Pedro Concepcion

Acting Governor-General of the Philippines
- In office January 9, 1932 – February 29, 1932
- Preceded by: Dwight F. Davis
- Succeeded by: Theodore Roosevelt Jr.

Vice Governor-General of the Philippines
- In office December 31, 1930 – June 30, 1932
- Preceded by: Nicholas Roosevelt
- Succeeded by: John H. Holliday

11th Philippine Secretary of Public Instruction
- In office December 31, 1930 – June 30, 1932
- Appointed by: Dwight F. Davis
- Preceded by: Nicholas Roosevelt
- Succeeded by: John H. Holliday

Attorney-General of Puerto Rico
- In office 1925–1928
- Governor: Horace Mann Towner
- Preceded by: Herbert P. Coats
- Succeeded by: James R. Beverley

Personal details
- Born: George Charles Butte; May 9, 1877 San Francisco, California, U.S.
- Died: January 18, 1940 (aged 62) Mexico City, Mexico
- Party: Republican
- Education: Austin College, University of Texas, Heidelberg University, University of Berlin

George Charles Butte (May 9, 1877 – January 18, 1940) was an American attorney, U.S. Army officer, educator, jurist, and Republican politician who served as an associate justice of the Supreme Court of the Philippines. He was also a candidate in the 1924 Texas gubernatorial election, running against Ma Ferguson. He also served as attorney general (1925-1928) and acting governor of Puerto Rico (1927-1928). He was an alumnus of Austin College, and studied at the University of Texas, the University of Berlin, Heidelberg University and the Ecole de Droit.

Party political offices
Preceded by William H. Atwell	Republican nominee for Governor of Texas; 1924	Succeeded by H. H. Haines
