= Negros Oriental's 1st congressional district =

Legislative district of the Philippines

- Constituency for the House of Representatives of the Philippines
- Location of Negros Oriental within the Philippines
- Province: Negros Oriental
- Region: Negros Island Region
- Population: 422,208 (2015)
- Electorate: 239,474 (2016)
- Major settlements: 9 Constituencies: Cities; Canlaon; Guihulngan; Municipalities; Ayungon; Bindoy; Jimalalud; La Libertad; Manjuyod; Tayasan; Vallehermoso
- Area: 1,797.44 km²

Current constituency
- Created: 1907
- Representative: Emmanuel L. Iway
- Political party: PFP
- Congressional bloc: Majority

Negros Oriental's 1st congressional district is one of the three congressional districts of the Philippines in the province of Negros Oriental. It has been represented in the House of Representatives of the Philippines since 1916 and earlier in the Philippine Assembly from 1907 to 1916. The district consists of the northern Negros Oriental cities of Canlaon and Guihulngan, as well as adjacent municipalities of Ayungon, Bindoy, Jimalalud, La Libertad, Manjuyod, Tayasan and Vallehermoso. It is currently represented in the 19th Congress by Jocelyn Sy-Limkaichong of the Liberal Party (LP).

== Representation history ==
#	Image	Member	Term of office		Legislature	Party	Electoral history	Constituent LGUs
#	Image	Member	Start	End	Legislature	Party	Electoral history	Constituent LGUs
=== Negros Oriental's 1st district for the Philippine Assembly ===
District created January 9, 1907.
1		Leopoldo Rovira	October 16, 1907	October 16, 1909	1st	Progresista	Elected in 1907.	1907–1909; Ayuquitan Nuevo, Bais, Dumaguete, Guihulngan, Tanjay, Tayasan
2		Hermenegildo Villanueva	October 16, 1909	October 16, 1916	2nd	Progresista	Elected in 1909.	1909–1912; Ayuquitan Nuevo, Bais, Dumaguete, Guihulngan, Manjuyod, Tanjay, Tayasan
2		Hermenegildo Villanueva	October 16, 1909	October 16, 1916	3rd	Progresista	Re-elected in 1912.	1912–1916; Ayuquitan Nuevo, Bais, Dumaguete, Guihulngan, Jimalalud, Manjuyod, Sibulan, Tanjay, Tayasan
=== Negros Oriental's 1st district for the House of Representatives of the Philippine Islands ===
3		Restituto Villegas	October 16, 1916	June 6, 1922	4th	Progresista	Elected in 1916.	1916–1919; Ayuquitan Nuevo, Bais, Dumaguete, Guihulngan, Jimalalud, Manjuyod, Sibulan, Tanjay, Tayasan, Vallehermoso
3		Restituto Villegas	October 16, 1916	June 6, 1922	5th	Progresista	Re-elected in 1919.	1919–1935; Ayuquitan Nuevo, Bais, Dumaguete, Guihulngan, Jimalalud, La Libertad, Manjuyod, Sibulan, Tanjay, Tayasan, Vallehermoso
4		Guillermo Z. Villanueva	June 6, 1922	September 16, 1935	6th	Nacionalista; Colectivista	Elected in 1922.	1919–1935; Ayuquitan Nuevo, Bais, Dumaguete, Guihulngan, Jimalalud, La Libertad, Manjuyod, Sibulan, Tanjay, Tayasan, Vallehermoso
4		Guillermo Z. Villanueva	June 6, 1922	September 16, 1935	7th	Nacionalista; Consolidado	Re-elected in 1925.	1919–1935; Ayuquitan Nuevo, Bais, Dumaguete, Guihulngan, Jimalalud, La Libertad, Manjuyod, Sibulan, Tanjay, Tayasan, Vallehermoso
4		Guillermo Z. Villanueva	June 6, 1922	September 16, 1935	8th	Nacionalista; Consolidado	Re-elected in 1928.	1919–1935; Ayuquitan Nuevo, Bais, Dumaguete, Guihulngan, Jimalalud, La Libertad, Manjuyod, Sibulan, Tanjay, Tayasan, Vallehermoso
4		Guillermo Z. Villanueva	June 6, 1922	September 16, 1935	9th	Nacionalista; Consolidado	Re-elected in 1931.	1919–1935; Ayuquitan Nuevo, Bais, Dumaguete, Guihulngan, Jimalalud, La Libertad, Manjuyod, Sibulan, Tanjay, Tayasan, Vallehermoso
4		Guillermo Z. Villanueva	June 6, 1922	September 16, 1935	10th	Nacionalista; Democrático	Re-elected in 1934.	1919–1935; Ayuquitan Nuevo, Bais, Dumaguete, Guihulngan, Jimalalud, La Libertad, Manjuyod, Sibulan, Tanjay, Tayasan, Vallehermoso
#	Image	Member	Term of office		National Assembly	Party	Electoral history	Constituent LGUs
#	Image	Member	Start	End	National Assembly	Party	Electoral history	Constituent LGUs
=== Negros Oriental's 1st district for the National Assembly (Commonwealth of the Philippines) ===
(4)		Guillermo Z. Villanueva	September 16, 1935	December 30, 1941	1st	Nacionalista; Democrático	Re-elected in 1935.	1935–1941; Ayuquitan Nuevo, Bais, Dumaguete, Guihulngan, Jimalalud, La Libertad, Manjuyod, Sibulan, Tanjay, Tayasan, Vallehermoso
(4)		Guillermo Z. Villanueva	September 16, 1935	December 30, 1941	2nd	Nacionalista	Re-elected in 1938.	1935–1941; Ayuquitan Nuevo, Bais, Dumaguete, Guihulngan, Jimalalud, La Libertad, Manjuyod, Sibulan, Tanjay, Tayasan, Vallehermoso
District dissolved into the two-seat Negros Oriental's at-large district for the National Assembly (Second Philippine Republic).
#	Image	Member	Term of office		Common wealth Congress	Party	Electoral history	Constituent LGUs
#	Image	Member	Start	End	Common wealth Congress	Party	Electoral history	Constituent LGUs
=== Negros Oriental's 1st district for the House of Representatives of the Commonwealth of the Philippines ===
District re-created May 24, 1945.
5		Julián L. Teves	June 11, 1945	May 25, 1946	1st	Nacionalista	Elected in 1941.	1945–1946; Ayuquitan Nuevo, Bais, Dumaguete, Guihulngan, Jimalalud, La Libertad, Manjuyod, Sibulan, Tanjay, Tayasan, Vallehermoso
#	Image	Member	Term of office		Congress	Party	Electoral history	Constituent LGUs
#	Image	Member	Start	End	Congress	Party	Electoral history	Constituent LGUs
=== Negros Oriental's 1st district for the House of Representatives of the Philippines ===
6		Lorenzo Teves	May 25, 1946	December 30, 1949	1st	Nacionalista	Elected in 1946.	1946–1949; Ayuquitan Nuevo, Bais, Dumaguete, Guihulngan, Jimalalud, La Libertad, Manjuyod, Sibulan, Tanjay, Tayasan, Vallehermoso
7		Pedro A. Bandoquillo	December 30, 1949	November 13, 1951	2nd	Liberal	Elected in 1949. Resigned on election as Negros Oriental governor.	1949–1953; Ayuquitan Nuevo, Bais, Canlaon, Dumaguete, Guihulngan, Jimalalud, La Libertad, Manjuyod, Payabon, Sibulan, Tanjay, Tayasan, Vallehermoso
(6)		Lorenzo Teves	December 30, 1953	November 14, 1967	3rd	Nacionalista	Elected in 1953.	1953–1957; Amlan, Bais, Canlaon, Dumaguete, Guihulngan, Jimalalud, La Libertad, Manjuyod, Payabon, Sibulan, Tanjay, Tayasan, Vallehermoso
(6)		Lorenzo Teves	December 30, 1953	November 14, 1967	4th	Nacionalista	Re-elected in 1957.	1957–1961; Amlan, Bais, Canlaon, Dumaguete, Guihulngan, Jimalalud, La Libertad, Manjuyod, Payabon, San Jose, Sibulan, Tanjay, Tayasan, Vallehermoso
(6)		Lorenzo Teves	December 30, 1953	November 14, 1967	5th	Nacionalista	Elected in 1961.	1961–1972; Amlan, Bais, Bindoy, Canlaon, Dumaguete, Guihulngan, Jimalalud, La Libertad, Mabinay Manjuyod, Pamplona, San Jose, Sibulan, Tanjay, Tayasan, Vallehermoso
(6)		Lorenzo Teves	December 30, 1953	November 14, 1967	6th	Nacionalista	Re-elected in 1965. Resigned on election as senator.	1961–1972; Amlan, Bais, Bindoy, Canlaon, Dumaguete, Guihulngan, Jimalalud, La Libertad, Mabinay Manjuyod, Pamplona, San Jose, Sibulan, Tanjay, Tayasan, Vallehermoso
8		Herminio Teves	December 30, 1969	September 23, 1972	7th	Liberal	Elected in 1969. Removed from office after imposition of martial law.	1961–1972; Amlan, Bais, Bindoy, Canlaon, Dumaguete, Guihulngan, Jimalalud, La Libertad, Mabinay Manjuyod, Pamplona, San Jose, Sibulan, Tanjay, Tayasan, Vallehermoso
District dissolved into the thirteen-seat Region VII's at-large district for the Interim Batasang Pambansa, followed by the three-seat Negros Oriental's at-large district for the Regular Batasang Pambansa.
District re-created February 2, 1987.
9		Jerome V. Paras	June 30, 1987	June 30, 1998	8th	Lakas ng Bansa	Elected in 1987.	1987–present Ayungon, Bindoy, Canlaon, Guihulngan, Jimalalud, La Libertad, Manjuyod, Tayasan, Vallehermoso
9		Jerome V. Paras	June 30, 1987	June 30, 1998	9th	Lakas	Re-elected in 1992.	1987–present Ayungon, Bindoy, Canlaon, Guihulngan, Jimalalud, La Libertad, Manjuyod, Tayasan, Vallehermoso
9		Jerome V. Paras	June 30, 1987	June 30, 1998	10th	Lakas	Re-elected in 1995.	1987–present Ayungon, Bindoy, Canlaon, Guihulngan, Jimalalud, La Libertad, Manjuyod, Tayasan, Vallehermoso
10		Jacinto Paras	June 30, 1998	June 30, 2007	11th	LAMMP	Elected in 1998.	1987–present Ayungon, Bindoy, Canlaon, Guihulngan, Jimalalud, La Libertad, Manjuyod, Tayasan, Vallehermoso
10		Jacinto Paras	June 30, 1998	June 30, 2007	12th	LDP	Re-elected in 2001.	1987–present Ayungon, Bindoy, Canlaon, Guihulngan, Jimalalud, La Libertad, Manjuyod, Tayasan, Vallehermoso
10		Jacinto Paras	June 30, 1998	June 30, 2007	13th	LDP	Re-elected in 2004.	1987–present Ayungon, Bindoy, Canlaon, Guihulngan, Jimalalud, La Libertad, Manjuyod, Tayasan, Vallehermoso
11		Jocelyn Sy-Limkaichong	June 30, 2007	June 30, 2013	14th	Liberal	Elected in 2007.	1987–present Ayungon, Bindoy, Canlaon, Guihulngan, Jimalalud, La Libertad, Manjuyod, Tayasan, Vallehermoso
11		Jocelyn Sy-Limkaichong	June 30, 2007	June 30, 2013	15th	Liberal	Re-elected in 2010.	1987–present Ayungon, Bindoy, Canlaon, Guihulngan, Jimalalud, La Libertad, Manjuyod, Tayasan, Vallehermoso
12		Manuel M. Iway	June 30, 2013	June 30, 2016	16th	Liberal	Elected in 2013.	1987–present Ayungon, Bindoy, Canlaon, Guihulngan, Jimalalud, La Libertad, Manjuyod, Tayasan, Vallehermoso
(11)		Jocelyn Sy-Limkaichong	June 30, 2016	June 30, 2025	17th	Liberal	Elected in 2016.	1987–present Ayungon, Bindoy, Canlaon, Guihulngan, Jimalalud, La Libertad, Manjuyod, Tayasan, Vallehermoso
(11)		Jocelyn Sy-Limkaichong	June 30, 2016	June 30, 2025	18th	Liberal	Re-elected in 2019.	1987–present Ayungon, Bindoy, Canlaon, Guihulngan, Jimalalud, La Libertad, Manjuyod, Tayasan, Vallehermoso
(11)		Jocelyn Sy-Limkaichong	June 30, 2016	June 30, 2025	19th	Liberal	Re-elected in 2022.	1987–present Ayungon, Bindoy, Canlaon, Guihulngan, Jimalalud, La Libertad, Manjuyod, Tayasan, Vallehermoso
(12)		Emmanuel L. Iway	June 30, 2025	Incumbent	20th	PFP	Elected in 2025.	1987–present Ayungon, Bindoy, Canlaon, Guihulngan, Jimalalud, La Libertad, Manjuyod, Tayasan, Vallehermoso

== Election results ==
=== 2025 ===
2025 Philippine House of Representatives elections
Party	Candidate	Votes	%
PFP	Emmanuel L. Iway	138,507	62.54%
Liberal	Kingking Mijares	82,977	37.46%
Total votes		221,484	100%
PFP gain from NPC			

=== 2022 ===
2022 Philippine House of Representatives elections
Party	Candidate	Votes	%
Liberal	Jocelyn Sy-Limkaichong (incumbent)	136,594	100.00%
Total votes		136,594	100.00%
Liberal hold			

=== 2019 ===
2019 Philippine House of Representatives elections
Party	Candidate	Votes	%
Liberal	Jocelyn Sy-Limkaichong (incumbent)	131,599	
Lakas	Jacinto Paras	16,071	
Independent	Danny Roble	2,172	
Total votes			100.00%
Liberal hold			

=== 2016 ===
2016 Philippine House of Representatives elections
Party	Candidate	Votes	%
Liberal	Jocelyn Sy-Limkaichong	94,800	60.55%
NUP	Jacinto Paras	60,506	38.64%
Independent	Danny Roble	1,252	0.79%
Invalid or blank votes		43,466	
Total votes		200,024	100.00%
Liberal hold			

=== 2013 ===
2013 Philippine House of Representatives elections
Party	Candidate	Votes	%
Liberal	Manuel Iway	67,880	49.15
NPC	Jerome Paras	66,072	47.84
Independent	Lowell Andaya	3,399	2.46
Independent	Danilo Roble	755	0.55
Margin of victory		1,808	1.31%
Total votes		138,106	100.00
Liberal hold			

=== 2010 ===
2010 Philippine House of Representatives elections
Party	Candidate	Votes	%
Liberal	Jocelyn Sy-Limkaichong	106,255	63.95
Lakas–Kampi	Jacinto Paras	59,474	35.79
Independent	Danilo Roble	423	0.25
Valid ballots		166,152	93.64
Invalid or blank votes		11,294	6.36
Total votes		177,446	100.00
Liberal hold			

== See also ==
- Legislative districts of Negros Oriental
