= Bindoy =

Municipality in Negros Oriental, Philippines

Bindoy Payabon
- Municipality
- Municipality of Bindoy
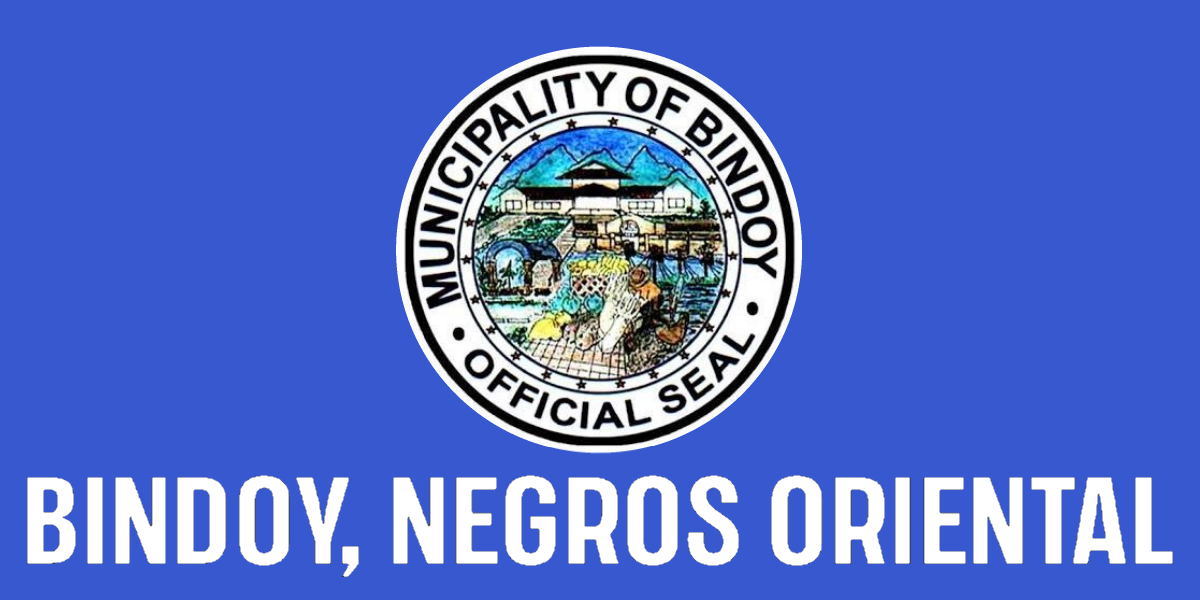
- Flag

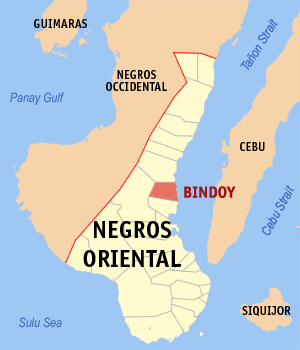
- Map of Negros Oriental with Bindoy highlighted
- Interactive map of Bindoy
- Location within the Philippines
- Coordinates: 9°46′N 123°08′E
- Country: Philippines
- Region: Negros Island Region
- Province: Negros Oriental
- District: 1st district
- Founded: June 17, 1949
- Named for: Hermenegildo Villanueva
- Barangays: 22 (see Barangays)

Government
  - Type: Sangguniang Bayan
  - Mayor: Eniego C. Jabagat (NPC)
  - Vice Mayor: Louie A. Rastica (PFP)
  - Representative: Emmanuel L. Iway (PFP)
  - Municipal Council: Members: Rafael L. Amorganda; Rebecca V. Dy; Villiam V. Amaro; Mel Bruce Y. Marquita; Demetrio M. Duran; Romeo C. Garsula; Beverly I. Dy; Renante C. Cadiente; Joel Verenio ^{‡}; Randolph Vince Y. Bomediano ^{◌}; ‡ ex officio ABC president; ◌ ex officio SK chairman
  - Electorate: 26,822 voters (2025)

Area
  - Total: 173.70 km^{2} (67.07 sq mi)
- Elevation: 147 m (482 ft)
- Highest elevation: 842 m (2,762 ft)
- Lowest elevation: 0 m (0 ft)

Population (2024 census)
  - Total: 41,543
  - Density: 239.17/km^{2} (619.44/sq mi)
  - Households: 9,813

Economy
  - Income class: 2nd municipal income class
  - Poverty incidence: 43.65% (2023)
  - Revenue: ₱ 206.1 million (2024)
  - Assets: ₱ 634 million (2024)
  - Expenditure: ₱ 125.1 million (2024)
  - Liabilities: ₱ 94.14 million (2024)

Service provider
  - Electricity: Negros Oriental 1 Electric Cooperative (NORECO 1)
- Time zone: UTC+8 (PST)
- ZIP code: 6209
- PSGC: 074607000
- IDD : area code: +63 (0)35
- Native languages: Cebuano; Tagalog

Bindoy (formerly Payabon), officially the Municipality of Bindoy (Cebuano: Lungsod sa Bindoy; Tagalog: Bayan ng Bindoy), is a 2nd class municipality in the province of Negros Oriental, Philippines. According to the 2024 census, it has a population of 41,543 people.

== History ==
The current site of Poblacion started as Barrio Payabon in the Municipality of Manjuyod. The municipality came to existence when Barrio Pabayon was joined with barrios of Malaga, Pangalaycayan, Cabugan, Piñahan, Batangan, Bulod, Atotes, Nalundan, Salong, Tubod, Canluto, Matobato, Tinaogan, Domolog, Tagaytay, and Danao and the sitios of Camodlas, Mansehe, and Cabcaban, to form the Municipality of Payabon when Executive Order No. 228 was signed on June 17, 1949 by then President Elpidio Quirino. On June 26, 1959, the municipality was renamed to its current name Bindoy, in honor of the late Hermenegildo “Bindoy” Teves Villanueva, who served as governor of Negros Oriental, assemblyman of the First District, Secretary of Labor, and Senator of the Republic.

== Geography ==
Bindoy encompasses 173.7 square kilometers (67.07 square miles) of area. It is bounded with the municipalities of Ayungon in the north, Mabinay to the west, and Manjuyod to the south. It also shares a coastline with Tañon Strait. Bindoy is 70 kilometres (43 mi) from Dumaguete.

Bindoy's Bulod flatstones are weighty export items. Bindoy's mangroves salute nature conservationists, as do dainty Mantahaw Falls and limpid Mantahaw Lake.

=== Barangays ===
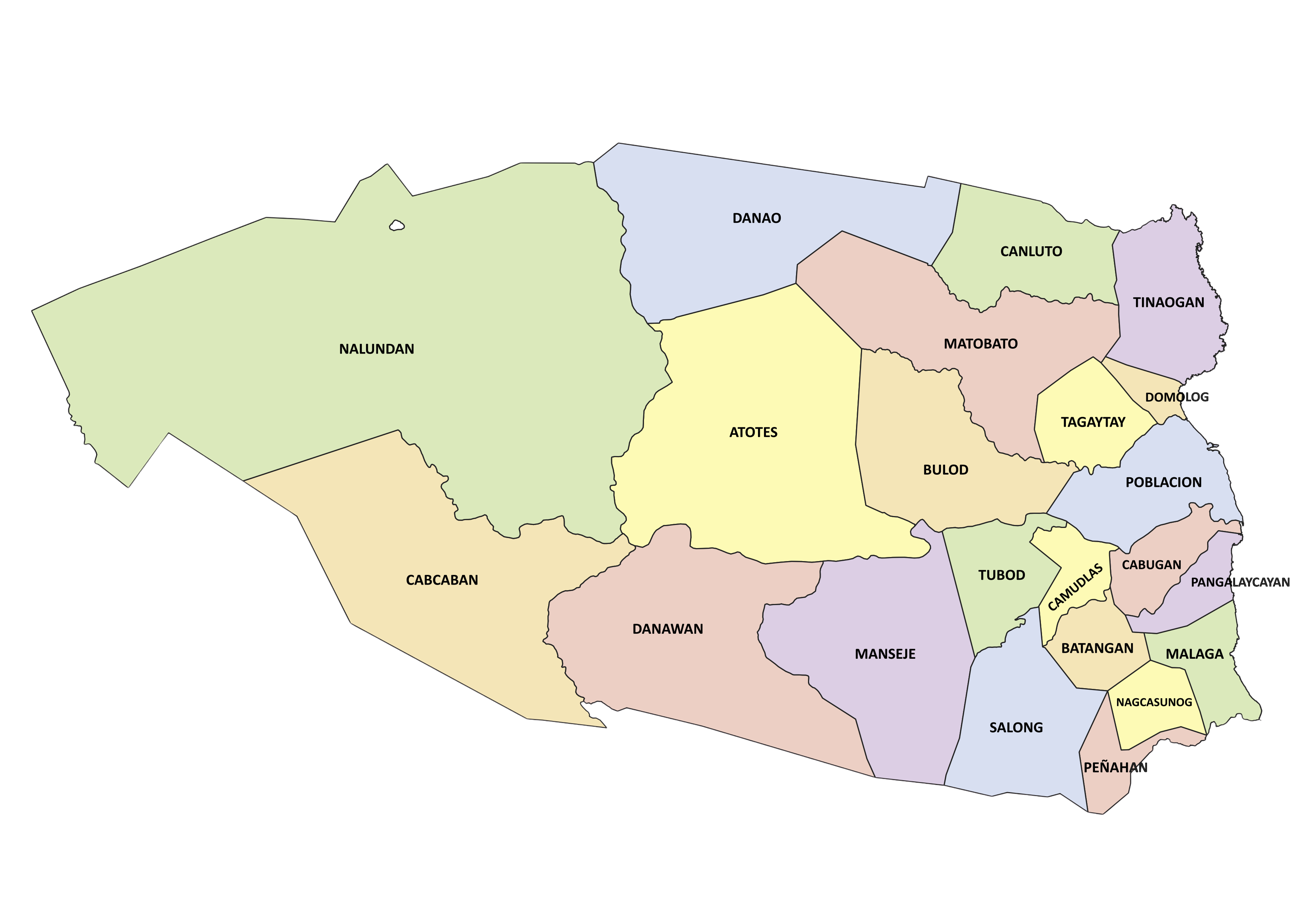
Political map of Bindoy

Bindoy is politically subdivided into 22 barangays. Each barangay consists of puroks and some have sitios.

| PSGC | Barangay | Population | | | ±% p.a. | |
| | | 2024 | | 2010 | | |
|---|---|---|---|---|---|---|
| 074607001 | Atotes | 4.6% | 1,905 | 2,285 | ▾ | −1.25% |
| 074607002 | Batangan | 2.2% | 920 | 812 | ▴ | 0.87% |
| 074607003 | Bulod | 4.7% | 1,938 | 1,910 | ▴ | 0.10% |
| 074607004 | Cabcaban | 7.4% | 3,090 | 3,062 | ▴ | 0.06% |
| 074607005 | Cabugan | 4.0% | 1,642 | 1,514 | ▴ | 0.56% |
| 074607006 | Camudlas | 2.2% | 924 | 866 | ▴ | 0.45% |
| 074607007 | Canluto | 3.5% | 1,440 | 1,412 | ▴ | 0.14% |
| 074607008 | Danao | 2.9% | 1,215 | 1,079 | ▴ | 0.83% |
| 074607009 | Danawan | 2.7% | 1,133 | 1,211 | ▾ | −0.46% |
| 074607010 | Domolog | 4.6% | 1,902 | 1,692 | ▴ | 0.81% |
| 074607011 | Malaga | 4.5% | 1,874 | 1,763 | ▴ | 0.42% |
| 074607012 | Manseje | 2.4% | 1,000 | 1,001 | ▾ | −0.01% |
| 074607013 | Matobato | 5.8% | 2,392 | 2,158 | ▴ | 0.72% |
| 074607014 | Nagcasunog | 1.4% | 580 | 582 | ▾ | −0.02% |
| 074607015 | Nalundan | 17.2% | 7,132 | 7,242 | ▾ | −0.11% |
| 074607016 | Pangalaycayan | 3.4% | 1,395 | 1,198 | ▴ | 1.06% |
| 074607017 | Peñahan | 1.8% | 754 | 598 | ▴ | 1.62% |
| 074607018 | Poblacion (Payabon) | 7.6% | 3,160 | 3,113 | ▴ | 0.10% |
| 074607019 | Salong | 1.7% | 703 | 778 | ▾ | −0.70% |
| 074607020 | Tagaytay | 4.2% | 1,727 | 1,662 | ▴ | 0.27% |
| 074607021 | Tinaogan | 6.5% | 2,686 | 2,713 | ▾ | −0.07% |
| 074607022 | Tubod | 1.9% | 796 | 765 | ▴ | 0.28% |
| | Total | | 41,543 | 39,416 | ▴ | 0.36% |

=== Climate ===
Climate data for Bindoy, Negros Oriental
| Month | Jan | Feb | Mar | Apr | May | Jun | Jul | Aug | Sep | Oct | Nov | Dec | Year |
|---|---|---|---|---|---|---|---|---|---|---|---|---|---|
| Mean daily maximum °C (°F) | 29 (84) | 29 (84) | 30 (86) | 32 (90) | 31 (88) | 30 (86) | 30 (86) | 30 (86) | 30 (86) | 30 (86) | 29 (84) | 29 (84) | 30 (86) |
| Mean daily minimum °C (°F) | 23 (73) | 23 (73) | 23 (73) | 24 (75) | 25 (77) | 25 (77) | 24 (75) | 24 (75) | 24 (75) | 24 (75) | 24 (75) | 23 (73) | 24 (75) |
| Average precipitation mm (inches) | 35 (1.4) | 28 (1.1) | 38 (1.5) | 51 (2.0) | 125 (4.9) | 195 (7.7) | 194 (7.6) | 173 (6.8) | 180 (7.1) | 192 (7.6) | 121 (4.8) | 64 (2.5) | 1,396 (55) |
| Average rainy days | 9.2 | 8.2 | 9.9 | 11.3 | 22.5 | 27.3 | 28.0 | 27.2 | 27.1 | 26.9 | 19.7 | 12.7 | 230 |
Source: Meteoblue

== Demographics ==
Population census of Bindoy
| Year | Pop. | ±% p.a. |
|---|---|---|
| 1960 | 13,348 | — |
| 1970 | 18,334 | +3.22% |
| 1975 | 21,121 | +2.88% |
| 1980 | 23,638 | +2.28% |
| 1990 | 29,347 | +2.19% |
| 1995 | 29,472 | +0.08% |
| 2000 | 34,773 | +3.61% |
| 2007 | 36,226 | +0.57% |
| 2010 | 39,416 | +3.12% |
| 2015 | 39,819 | +0.19% |
| 2020 | 40,308 | +0.26% |
| 2024 | 41,543 | +0.73% |
Source: Philippine Statistics Authority

== Economy ==
Poverty incidence of Bindoy (%)

Source: Philippine Statistics Authority

Bindoy is known as the hub of the Negros Oriental I Electric Cooperative, which energizes the northern towns. Its principal produce are copra, rice and corn, sugar cane, mangoes; and quantities of bamboo, pandan and romblon, tikog, buri, maguey and abaca to support cottage industries.

== Festivities ==
The annual Libod-Sayaw sa Bindoy, with streetdancing based on folk dances, is a colorful highlight of the town fiesta.

== Education ==
The public schools in the town of Bindoy are administered by two school districts under the Schools Division of Negros Oriental.

Elementary schools:

- Atotes Elementary School — Atotes
- Batangan Elementary School — Batangan
- Bindoy Central Elementary School — Poblacion
- Bulod Elementary School — Bulod
- Cabcaban Elementary School — Cabcaban
- Cabugan Elementary School — Cabugan
- Calatagan Elementary School — Sitio Calatagan, Nalundan
- Campulay Elementary School — Sitio Ogasim, Atotes
- Camudlas Elementary School — Camudlas
- Canluto Elementary School — Canluto
- Capipines Elementary School — Sitio Capipines, Nalundan
- Danao Elementary School — Danao
- Danawan Elementary School — Danawan
- Domolog Elementary School — Domolog
- Malaga Elementary School — Malaga
- Manseje Elementary School — Manseje
- Mantahaw Elementary School — Sitio Mantahaw, Nalundan
- Matobato Elementary School — Matobato
- Nagcasunog Elementary School — Nagcasunog
- Nalundan Elementary School — Nalundan
- Naula-an Elementary School — Sitio Naula-an, Danawan
- Pagsalayon Elementary School — Sitio Pagsalayon, Nalundan
- Pangalaycayan Elementary School — Pangalaycayan
- Peñahan Elementary School — Peñahan
- Salong Elementary School — Salong
- Tagaytay Elementary School — Tagaytay
- Talaptapan Elementary School — Sitio Talaptapan, Nalundan
- Tinaogan Elementary School — Tinaogan
- Tubod Elementary School — Tubod

High schools:

- Cabcaban Community High School — Cabcaban
- Demetrio L. Alviola National High School — Tinaogan
- Demetrio L. Alviola NHS - Malaga Extension — Malaga
- Demetrio L. Alviola NHS - Nalundan Extension — Sitio Lawi, Nalundan

Private schools:

- Bindoy UCCP Early Childhood Learning Center — Poblacion

== Notable people ==
- Juanita Amatong (b. 1935) - former secretary of Department of Finance (2003 - 2005)

== See also ==
- List of renamed cities and municipalities of the Philippines
