= Manjuyod =

Municipality in Negros Oriental, Philippines

- Municipality
- Municipality of Manjuyod
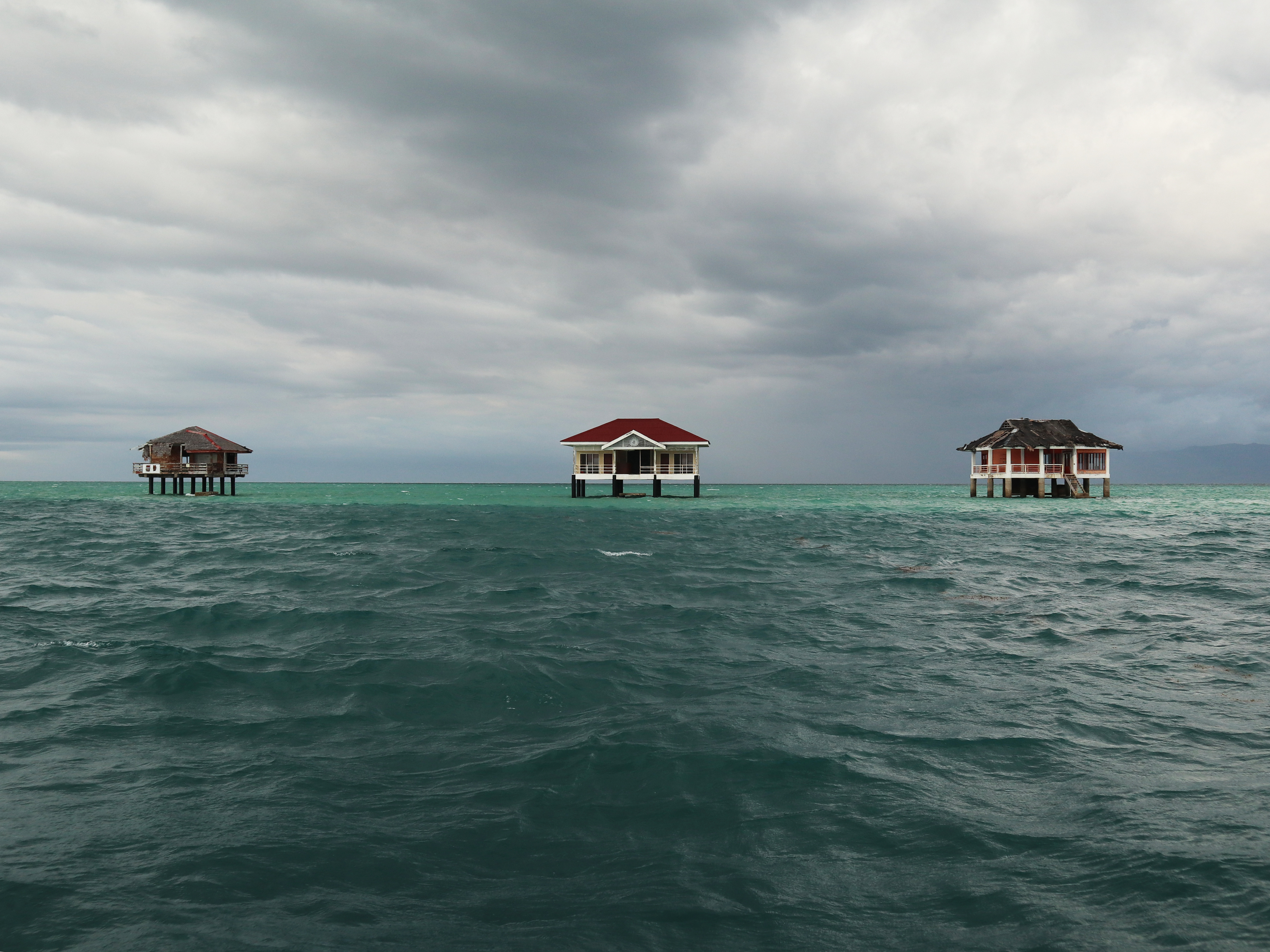
- Manjuyod sandbar and cottages

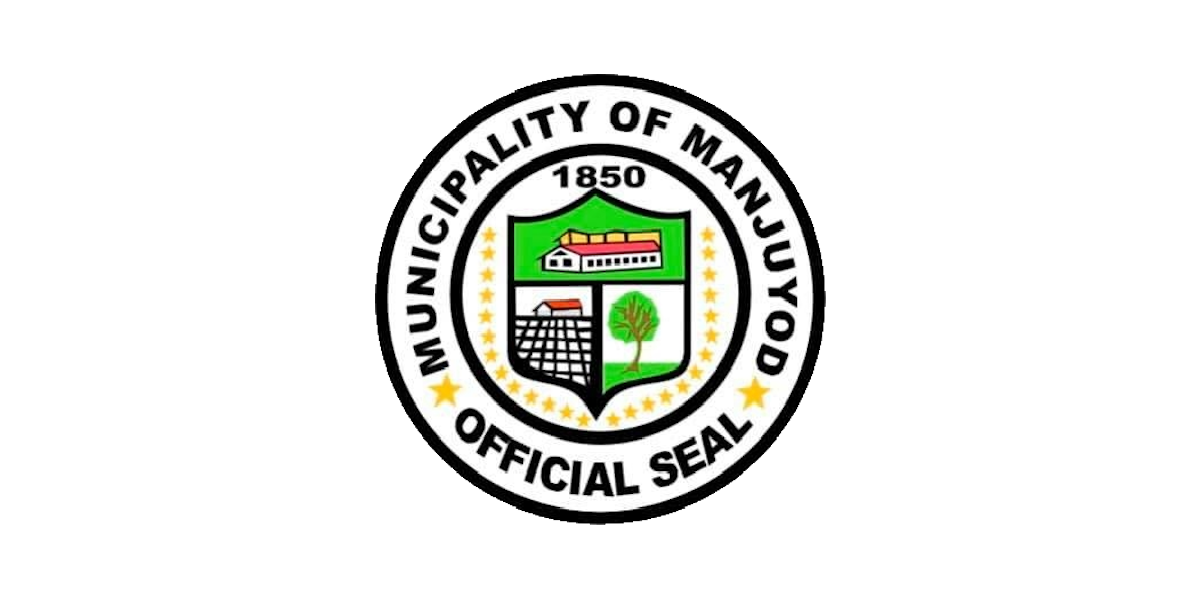
- Flag
- Anthem: "Manjuyod, Pinangga Gayud"
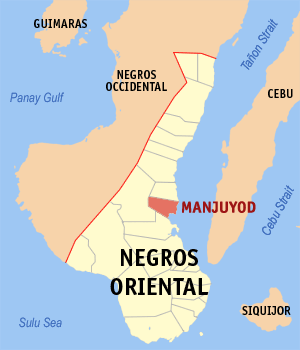
- Map of Negros Oriental with Manjuyod highlighted
- Interactive map of Manjuyod
- Location within the Philippines
- Coordinates: 9°41′N 123°09′E
- Country: Philippines
- Region: Negros Island Region
- Province: Negros Oriental
- District: 1st district
- Founded: 1850
- Barangays: 27 (see Barangays)

Government
  - Type: Sangguniang Bayan
  - Mayor: Raffy Alipio S. Andaya (NPC)
  - Vice Mayor: Jeremiah B. Andaya (NPC)
  - Representative: Emmanuel L. Iway (PFP)
  - Municipal Council: Members: Harmon Parosh E. Balbon; Ralph Angelo D. Andaya; Erejoy A. Calinawan; Sidney G. Blaza; Guillermo Z. Banjao; Neil Arvin D. Abangan; Jenny A. Guimaras; Gevillen Palumar-Cabano; Antonio Tacuyan ^{‡}; Mevrence Meljoe A. Abuso ^{◌}; ‡ ex officio ABC president; ◌ ex officio SK chairman
  - Electorate: 30,106 voters (2025)

Area
  - Total: 264.60 km^{2} (102.16 sq mi)
- Elevation: 82 m (269 ft)
- Highest elevation: 714 m (2,343 ft)
- Lowest elevation: 0 m (0 ft)

Population (2024 census)
  - Total: 46,461
  - Density: 175.59/km^{2} (454.77/sq mi)
  - Households: 11,279

Economy
  - Income class: 1st municipal income class
  - Poverty incidence: 34.29% (2023)
  - Revenue: ₱ 238.4 million (2024)
  - Assets: ₱ 895.7 million (2024)
  - Expenditure: ₱ 414.2 million (2024)
  - Liabilities: ₱ 227.2 million (2024)

Service provider
  - Electricity: Negros Oriental 1 Electric Cooperative (NORECO 1)
- Time zone: UTC+8 (PST)
- ZIP code: 6208
- PSGC: 074615000
- IDD : area code: +63 (0)35
- Native languages: Cebuano; Tagalog

Manjuyod (Cebuano: Lungsod sa Manjuyod; Tagalog: Bayan ng Manjuyod), officially the Municipality of Manjuyod, is a municipality in the province of Negros Oriental, Philippines. According to the 2024 census, it has a population of 46,461 people.

== History ==
In 1850, Father Antonio Moreno, an Augustinian Recollect, spearheaded the construction of the municipality's town hall. He also laid out the layouts for the plaza and municipal streets. Moreno later opened more roads to the north, paving the way for the establishment of the sitios Payabon and Ayungon. Its position as a municipality was reaffirmed under Executive Order No. 37 in 1908.

As Manjuyod grew, several of its sitios seceded to form their own municipalities. In 1872, some sitios in the south separated to form the town of Bais, which later became a city. In 1949, sitio Payabon seceded to form Bindoy. In 1966, four sitios were transferred to the then-newly created municipality of Mabinay as part of its expansion. Sitio Kauswagan, however, did not secede, making it an exclave of Manjuyod that is not directly connected with any of the municipality's barangays.

== Geography ==
Manjuyod is situated in the central part of Negros Oriental. It is bound by the municipality of Bindoy in the north, Mabinay to the west, and the city of Bais in the south. It shares a coastline with Tañon Strait to the east. Manjuyod is 58 kilometres (36 mi) from Dumaguete.

=== Barangays ===
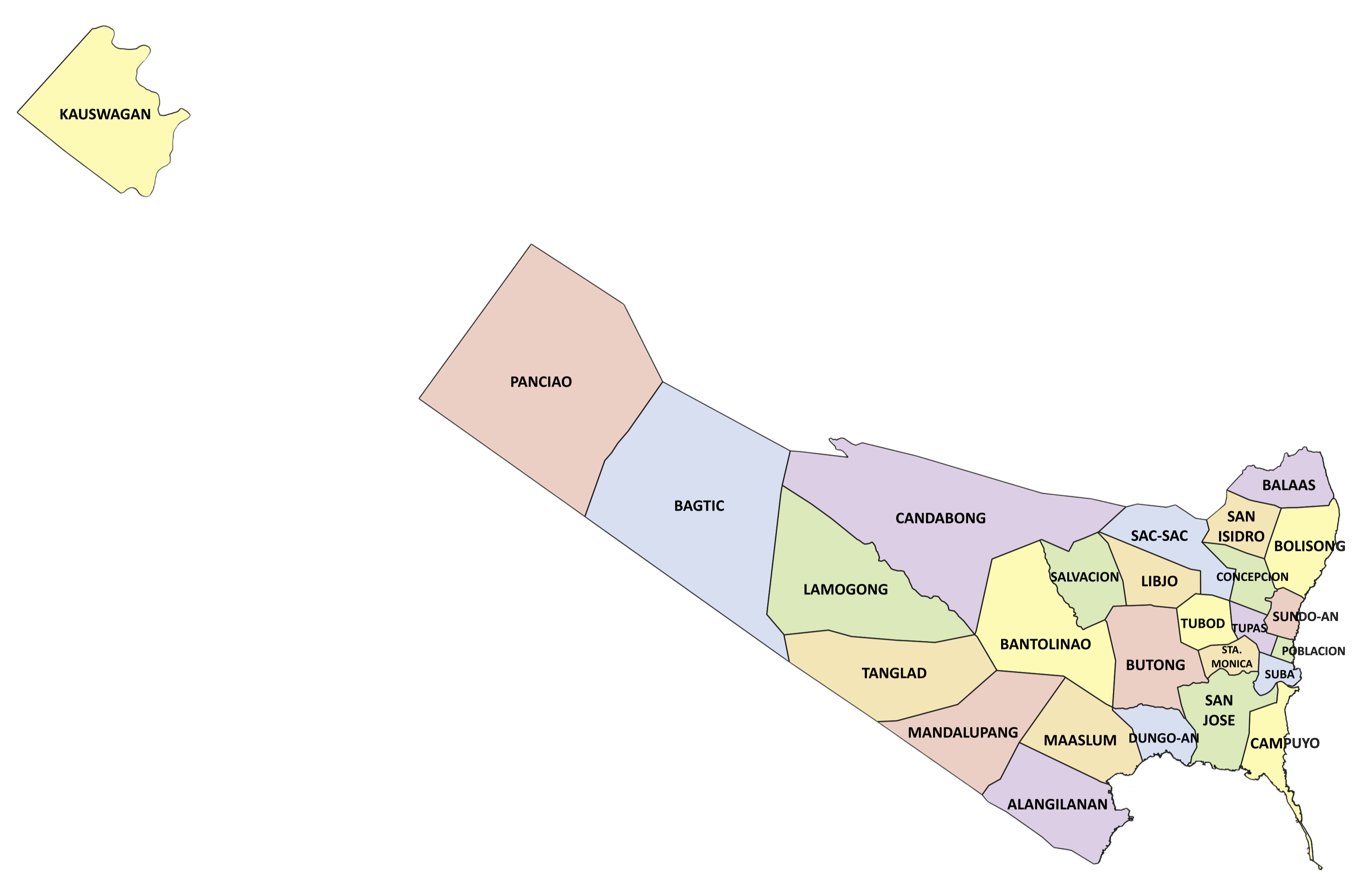
Political map of Manjuyod

Manjuyod is politically subdivided into 27 barangays. Each barangay consists of puroks and some have sitios.

Kauswagan is an exclave of the municipality; from the east, it is surrounded by the municipality of Mabinay and the city of Kabankalan in the province of Negros Occidental to the west.

PSGC	Barangay	Population			±% p.a.	
		2024		2010		
074615001	Alangilanan	4.8%	2,239	2,082	▴	0.51%
074615002	Bagtic	3.9%	1,825	1,646	▴	0.72%
074615003	Balaas	2.2%	1,004	858	▴	1.10%
074615004	Bantolinao	4.4%	2,047	2,026	▴	0.07%
074615005	Bolisong	7.6%	3,533	3,061	▴	1.00%
074615006	Butong	4.5%	2,076	1,882	▴	0.68%
074615007	Campuyo	7.5%	3,467	2,917	▴	1.21%
074615008	Candabong	5.2%	2,401	2,265	▴	0.41%
074615009	Concepcion	1.8%	836	741	▴	0.84%
074615010	Dungo-an	3.1%	1,428	1,249	▴	0.93%
074615011	Kauswagan	2.7%	1,240	1,288	▾	−0.26%
074615012	Libjo	2.5%	1,154	1,061	▴	0.59%
074615013	Lamogong	4.6%	2,133	1,954	▴	0.61%
074615015	Maaslum	4.8%	2,214	2,012	▴	0.67%
074615016	Mandalupang	4.9%	2,277	2,112	▴	0.52%
074615017	Panciao	4.4%	2,046	2,263	▾	−0.70%
074615018	Poblacion	2.4%	1,099	1,100	▾	−0.01%
074615019	Sac-sac	1.7%	767	791	▾	−0.21%
074615020	Salvacion	2.3%	1,089	1,007	▴	0.55%
074615021	San Isidro	1.8%	824	809	▴	0.13%
074615022	San Jose	3.2%	1,474	1,397	▴	0.37%
074615023	Santa Monica	0.3%	148	214	▾	−2.53%
074615024	Suba	2.0%	923	913	▴	0.08%
074615025	Sundo-an	4.1%	1,917	1,612	▴	1.21%
074615026	Tanglad	3.6%	1,652	1,361	▴	1.35%
074615027	Tubod	2.7%	1,263	875	▴	2.58%
074615028	Tupas	3.7%	1,723	1,611	▴	0.47%
	Total		46,461	41,107	▴	0.85%

=== Climate ===
Climate data for Manjuyod, Negros Oriental
Month	Jan	Feb	Mar	Apr	May	Jun	Jul	Aug	Sep	Oct	Nov	Dec	Year
Mean daily maximum °C (°F)	29 (84)	29 (84)	30 (86)	32 (90)	31 (88)	30 (86)	30 (86)	30 (86)	30 (86)	30 (86)	29 (84)	29 (84)	30 (86)
Mean daily minimum °C (°F)	23 (73)	23 (73)	23 (73)	24 (75)	25 (77)	25 (77)	24 (75)	24 (75)	24 (75)	24 (75)	24 (75)	23 (73)	24 (75)
Average precipitation mm (inches)	35 (1.4)	28 (1.1)	38 (1.5)	51 (2.0)	125 (4.9)	195 (7.7)	194 (7.6)	173 (6.8)	180 (7.1)	192 (7.6)	121 (4.8)	64 (2.5)	1,396 (55)
Average rainy days	9.2	8.2	9.9	11.3	22.5	27.3	28.0	27.2	27.1	26.9	19.7	12.7	230
Source: Meteoblue (Use with caution: this is modeled/calculated data, not measured locally.)

== Demographics ==
Population census of Manjuyod
Year	Pop.	±% p.a.
1903	8,289	—
1918	14,728	+3.91%
1939	25,581	+2.66%
1948	25,190	−0.17%
1960	18,456	−2.56%
1970	20,545	+1.08%
1975	22,949	+2.24%
1980	26,257	+2.73%
1990	31,989	+1.99%
1995	34,545	+1.45%
2000	37,863	+1.99%
2007	39,722	+0.66%
2010	41,107	+1.26%
2015	42,332	+0.56%
2020	44,799	+1.20%
2024	46,461	+0.88%
Source: Philippine Statistics Authority

== Economy ==
Poverty incidence of Manjuyod (%)

Source: Philippine Statistics Authority

== Tourism ==
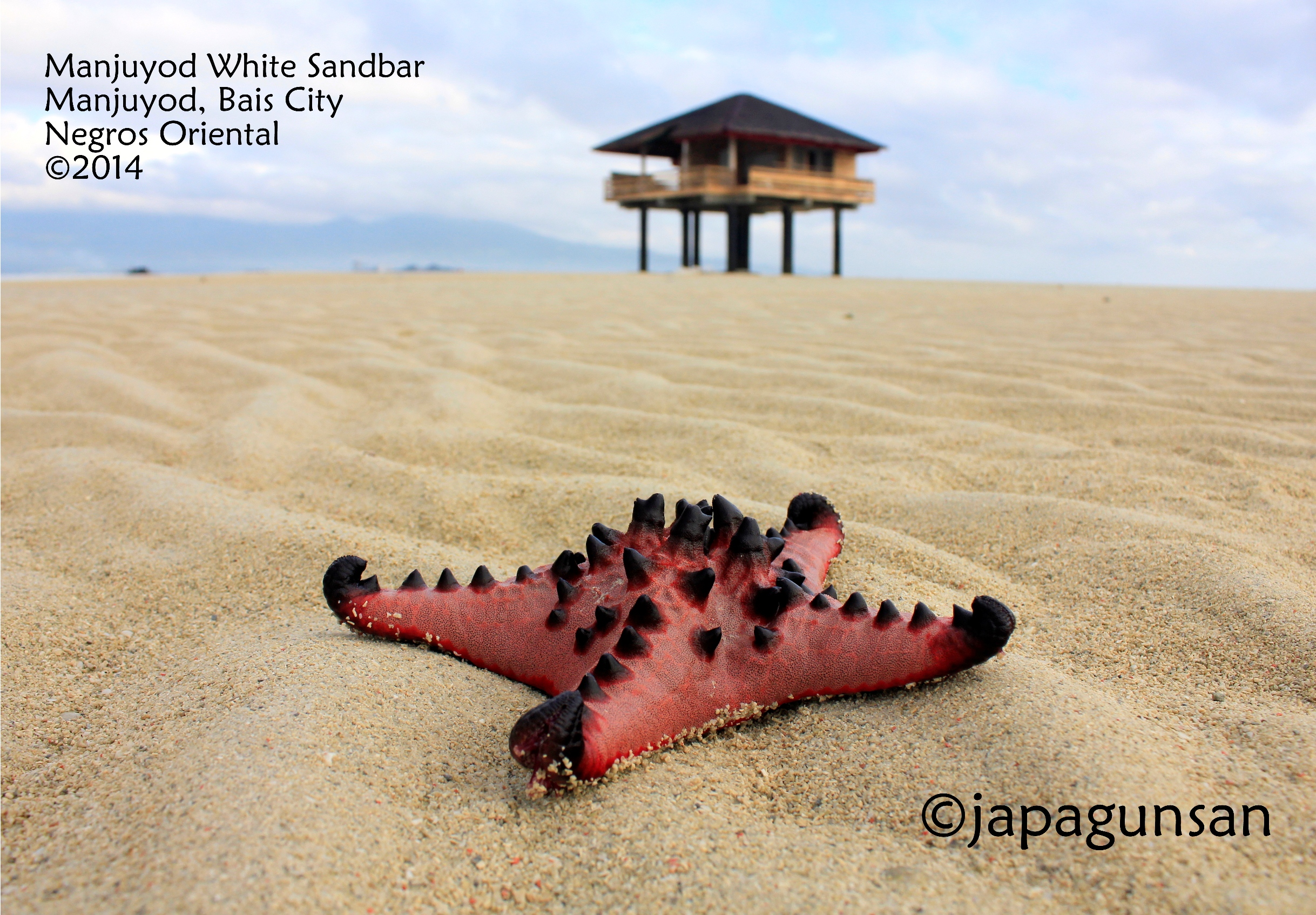
Manjuyod White Sandbar

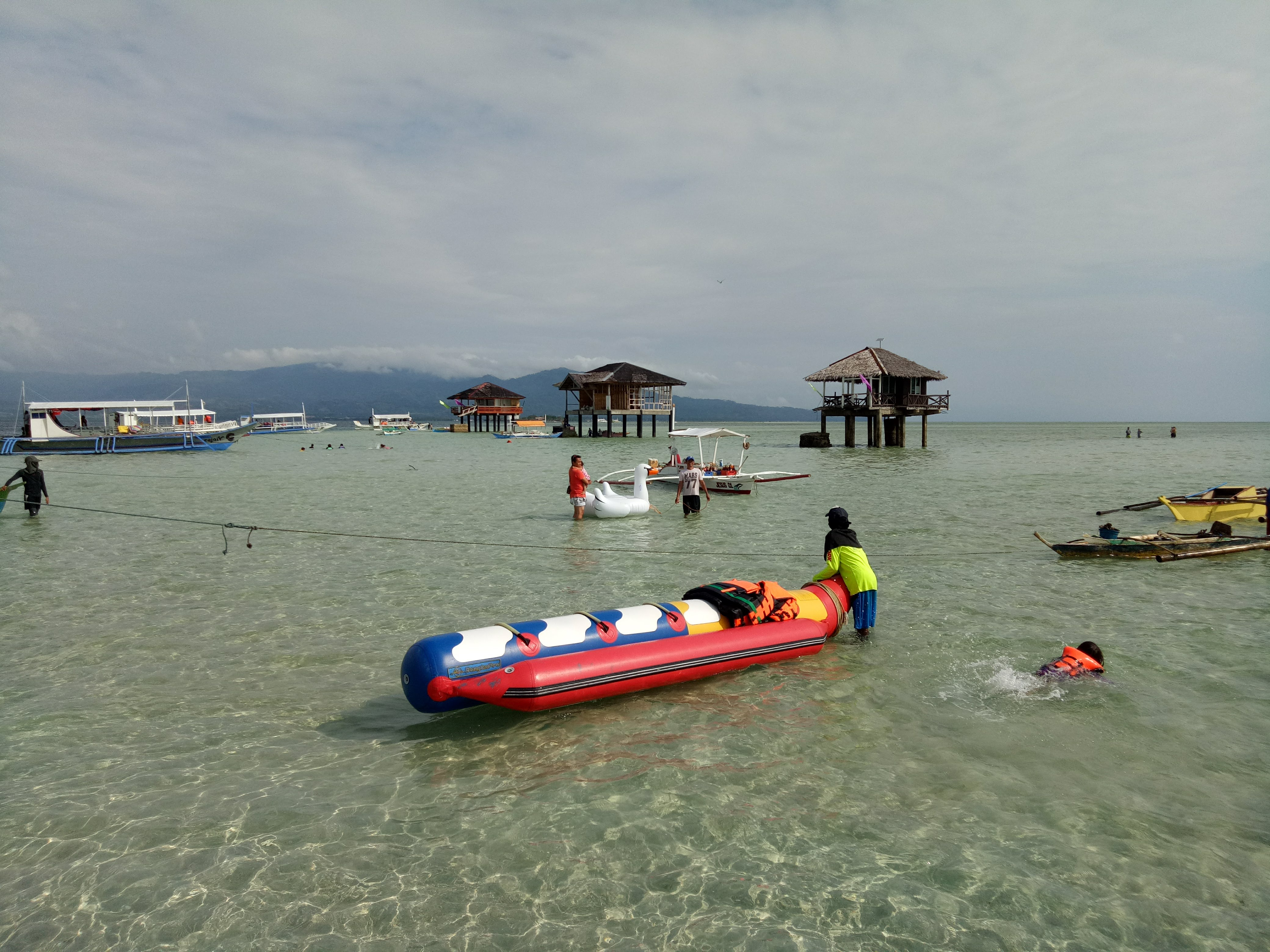

Tourist attractions in Manjuyod include the Himampangon Cave, a natural rock formation; and the Candabong forest, there are many species living in Candabong forest which is protected by the government. In recent years, the white sand bar, a narrow seven-kilometer strip of white beach sand, has been gaining attention from local and foreign tourists. It is often dubbed as the "Maldives of the Philippines."

=== Festival ===
Saint Francis of Assisi is the patron saint of Manjuyod, and his feast day is celebrated annually October 4 with the town fiesta. The fiesta is an official non-working holiday for the town.

== Education ==
The public schools in the town of Manjuyod are administered by two school districts under the Schools Division of Negros Oriental.

Elementary schools:

- Bagtic Elementary School — Panciao
- Bala-as Elementary School — Balaas
- Bolisong Elementary School — Bolisong
- Butong Elementary School — Butong
- Campuyo Elementary School — Campuyo
- Candabong Elementary School — Candabong
- Concepcion Elementary School — Concepcion
- Dungoan Elementary School — Dungo-an
- Kayotesan Elementary School — Kauswagan
- Lamogong Elementary School — Lamogong
- Libjo Elementary School — Libjo
- Locay Elementary School — Sitio Locay, Bagtic
- Managba Elementary School — Sitio Managba, Panciao
- Mandalupang Elementary School — Mandalupang
- Manjuyod Central Elementary School — Zulueta Street, Poblacion
- Matambok Elementary School — Sitio Matambok, Mandalupang
- Palay Elementary School — Sitio Palay, Candabong
- Sacsac Elementary School — Sac-sac
- Sagrada Elementary School — Alangilanan
- Salvacion Elementary School — Salvacion
- Sampiniton Elementary School — Sitio Sampiniton, Bantolinao
- San Isidro Elementary School — San Isidro
- San Jose Elementary School — San Jose
- Sotero A. Singco Memorial Elementary School — Maaslum
- Tanglad Elementary School — Tanglad
- Tubod Elementary School — Tubod
- Tupas Elementary School — Malvar Street, Tupas

High schools:

- Kauswagan High School — Kauswagan
- Manjuyod National High School — Paterno Street, Sundo-an
- Manjuyod Science High School — Paterno Street, Sundo-an
- Panciao High School — Panciao
- Sampiniton Provincial Community High School — Sitio Sampiniton, Bantolinao
