= La Libertad, Negros Oriental =

Municipality in Negros Oriental, Philippines

La Libertad
- Municipality
- Municipality of La Libertad
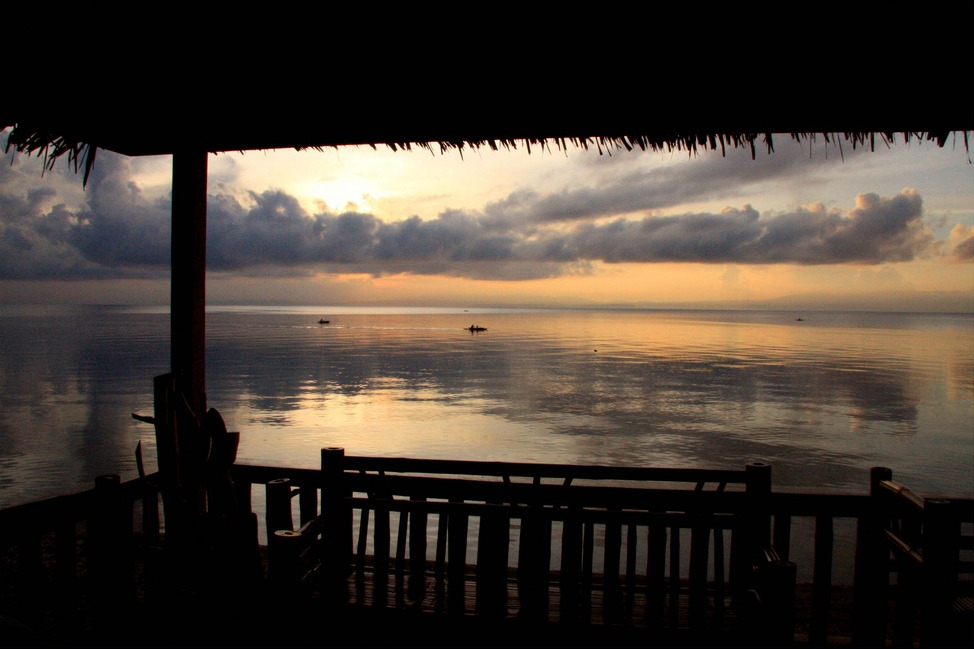
- Sunset view taken at a beach in La Libertad

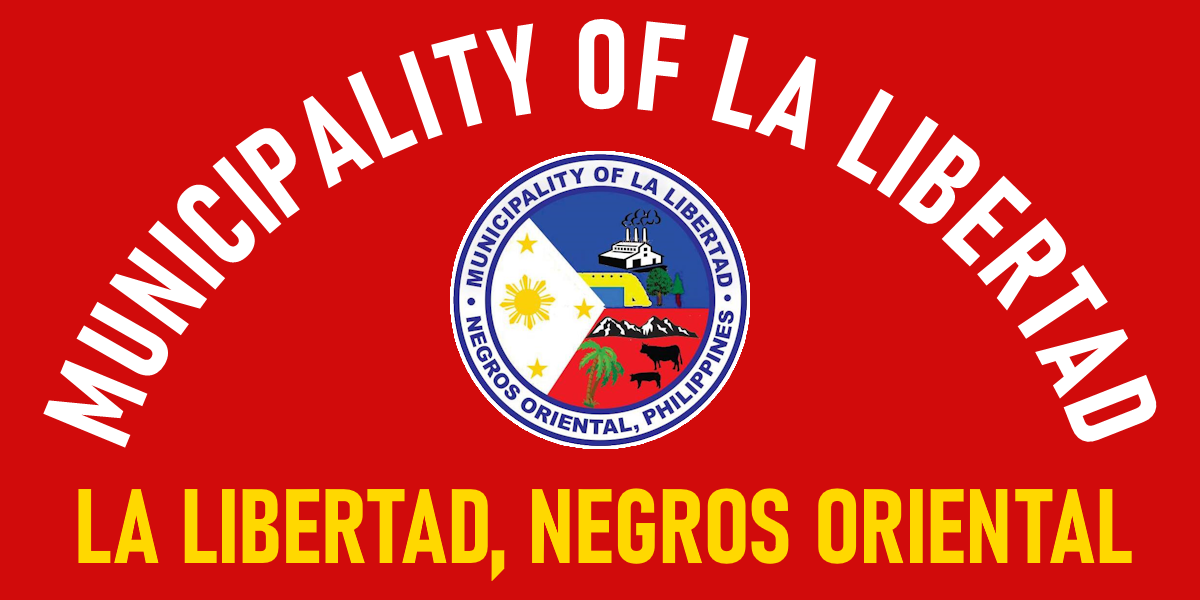
- Flag

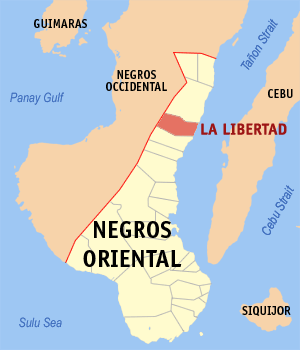
- Map of Negros Oriental with La Libertad highlighted
- Interactive map of La Libertad
- Location within the Philippines
- Coordinates: 10°02′N 123°13′E
- Country: Philippines
- Region: Negros Island Region
- Province: Negros Oriental
- District: 1st district
- Founded: January 10, 1919
- Barangays: 29 (see Barangays)

Government
  - Type: Sangguniang Bayan
  - Mayor: Lawrence D. Limkaichong (NPC)
  - Vice Mayor: Julius C. Sabac (PFP)
  - Representative: Emmanuel L. Iway (PFP)
  - Municipal Council: Members: James Bryan B. Solitana; Rene D. Gargoles; Nancy T. Laturnas; Maria Cleofe A. Facturan; Jovito P. Sabanal; Alita Cabildo-Pulga; Randy L. Dunque, Jr.; Redgil C. Medes; Teresita Gallosa ^{‡}; Crisha C. Sabac ^{◌}; ‡ ex officio ABC president; ◌ ex officio SK chairman
  - Electorate: 27,347 voters (2025)

Area
  - Total: 139.60 km^{2} (53.90 sq mi)
- Elevation: 50 m (160 ft)
- Highest elevation: 556 m (1,824 ft)
- Lowest elevation: 0 m (0 ft)

Population (2024 census)
  - Total: 42,721
  - Density: 306.02/km^{2} (792.60/sq mi)
  - Households: 10,285

Economy
  - Income class: 2nd municipal income class
  - Poverty incidence: 39.64% (2023)
  - Revenue: ₱ 193.2 million (2024)
  - Assets: ₱ 563.8 million (2024)
  - Expenditure: ₱ 169.8 million (2024)
  - Liabilities: ₱ 167.1 million (2024)

Service provider
  - Electricity: Negros Oriental 1 Electric Cooperative (NORECO 1)
- Time zone: UTC+8 (PST)
- ZIP code: 6213
- PSGC: 074613000
- IDD : area code: +63 (0)35
- Native languages: Cebuano; Tagalog
- Website: www.lalibertad-negor.gov.ph

La Libertad, officially the Municipality of La Libertad (Cebuano: Lungsod sa La Libertad; Tagalog: Bayan ng La Libertad), is a municipality in the province of Negros Oriental, Philippines. According to the 2024 census, it has a population of 42,721 people.

== History ==
Before and during the Spanish conquest of the Philippines, the Municipality of La Libertad was inhabited by indigenous tribes, mostly Negritos. Several families from neighboring villages and distant provinces began to settle, with one of the first pioneers being Pedro Absin.

Early settlers in the region established communities that later became part of present-day La Libertad. Many of them engaged in farming and fishing.

The fertile valleys of Hinoba-an drew several families who immigrated there in the later part of the Spanish period. The area was known for its fertile soil, which supported local farming activities.

La Libertad was severely affected by the 2012 Visayas earthquake, which caused landslides that killed 51 people.

== Geography ==
The Tañon Strait lies to the east of this municipality. La Libertad is located 105 km (65 mi) north of Dumaguete, the capital city of Negros Oriental.

=== Administration (barangays) ===
La Libertad is politically subdivided into 29 barangays. Each barangay is further divided into puroks, and some also include sitios.

PSGC	Barangay	Population			±% p.a.	
		2024		2010		
074613001	Aniniaw	2.4%	1,015	1,106	▾	−0.59%
074613002	Aya	2.5%	1,052	953	▴	0.69%
074613003	Bagtic	3.5%	1,497	1,344	▴	0.75%
074613004	Biga-a	2.2%	927	1,101	▾	−1.19%
074613005	Busilak	3.2%	1,369	1,176	▴	1.06%
074613006	Cangabo	2.8%	1,182	1,245	▾	−0.36%
074613007	Cantupa	3.2%	1,348	1,048	▴	1.76%
074613029	Elecia (Talostos)	3.9%	1,657	1,561	▴	0.42%
074613008	Eli	3.8%	1,629	1,273	▴	1.73%
074613009	Guihob	4.3%	1,843	2,048	▾	−0.73%
074613010	Kansumandig	3.2%	1,350	1,242	▴	0.58%
074613011	Mambulod	1.5%	662	632	▴	0.32%
074613012	Mandapaton	3.8%	1,603	1,927	▾	−1.27%
074613013	Manghulyawon	3.7%	1,578	1,398	▴	0.84%
074613014	Manluminsag	1.9%	808	776	▴	0.28%
074613015	Mapalasan	1.5%	660	557	▴	1.18%
074613016	Maragondong	2.1%	891	930	▾	−0.30%
074613017	Martilo	5.0%	2,134	2,038	▴	0.32%
074613018	Nasungan	4.4%	1,868	1,558	▴	1.27%
074613019	Pacuan	6.5%	2,777	2,478	▴	0.79%
074613020	Pangca	1.1%	488	652	▾	−1.99%
074613021	Pisong	3.1%	1,341	1,325	▴	0.08%
074613022	Pitogo	3.4%	1,441	1,216	▴	1.19%
074613023	Poblacion North	5.9%	2,507	2,319	▴	0.54%
074613024	Poblacion South	3.2%	1,371	1,338	▴	0.17%
074613025	San Jose	4.0%	1,689	1,703	▾	−0.06%
074613026	Solonggon	6.0%	2,565	2,235	▴	0.96%
074613027	Tala-on	2.1%	907	806	▴	0.82%
074613028	Talayong	2.2%	930	919	▴	0.08%
	Total		42,721	38,904	▴	0.65%

=== Climate ===
Climate data for La Libertad, Negros Oriental
Month	Jan	Feb	Mar	Apr	May	Jun	Jul	Aug	Sep	Oct	Nov	Dec	Year
Mean daily maximum °C (°F)	29 (84)	30 (86)	31 (88)	32 (90)	31 (88)	30 (86)	30 (86)	30 (86)	30 (86)	30 (86)	29 (84)	29 (84)	30 (86)
Mean daily minimum °C (°F)	23 (73)	22 (72)	23 (73)	24 (75)	25 (77)	25 (77)	25 (77)	25 (77)	25 (77)	24 (75)	24 (75)	23 (73)	24 (75)
Average precipitation mm (inches)	42 (1.7)	34 (1.3)	40 (1.6)	61 (2.4)	124 (4.9)	188 (7.4)	190 (7.5)	191 (7.5)	189 (7.4)	186 (7.3)	124 (4.9)	73 (2.9)	1,442 (56.8)
Average rainy days	10.0	8.5	9.5	12.8	22.3	26.8	28.4	27.9	27.3	27.6	20.5	13.1	234.7
Source: Meteoblue

== Economy ==
Poverty incidence of La Libertad (%)

Source: Philippine Statistics Authority

== Demographics ==
Population census of La Libertad
Year	Pop.	±% p.a.
1903	3,732	—
1939	17,795	+4.43%
1948	18,770	+0.59%
1960	25,335	+2.53%
1970	29,693	+1.60%
1975	31,460	+1.17%
1980	30,730	−0.47%
1990	29,958	−0.25%
1995	32,456	+1.51%
2000	35,122	+1.71%
2007	37,007	+0.72%
2010	38,904	+1.84%
2015	38,602	−0.15%
2020	41,089	+1.32%
2024	42,721	+0.94%
Source: Philippine Statistics Authority

== Tourism ==
The municipality is known for its white sandy beach of Solangon. The nearby Mt. Panciao is often visited for hiking and exploration.

== Education ==
The public schools in the town of La Libertad are administered by two school districts under the Schools Division of Negros Oriental.

== Government ==
Elected municipal officials (2010–2013):

- Mayor: Emmanuel Iway
- Vice Mayor: Lawrence Limkaichong
- Councilors:
  - Nancy Temonio Laturnas
  - Ronald Opada
  - Ronie Bulabon
  - Emelia Luz Medes
  - Leonida Rios
  - Jellenito Cayetano
  - Bertoldo Burlasa
  - Jovito Sabanal
  - ABC President: Ronald Gallosa
  - SK Federation President: PJ Arriesgado

=== List of former elective officials ===
Date	Position	Name
1919–1922	President	Isaac Dionaldo
	Vice-president	Narciso Absin
	Secretary	Francisco Bautista
	Councilors	Pio Banogon
		Luciano Libo-on
		Ireneo Villaespin
		Felipe Absin
		Andres Absin
		Fabio Torres
		Leon Bonda-on
		Brigido Sabanal
1922–1924	President	Isaac Dionaldo
	Vice-president	Fabio Torres
	Secretary	Roberto Estoconing
	Councilors	Margarito Gallosa
		Pedro Timtim
		Isaias Emperado
		Antonio Torres
		Pastor Carinal
		Marcelo Libo-on
		Bregido Sabanal
		Benedicto Libo-on
1925	President	Isaac Dionaldo
	Vice-president	Fabio Torres
	Secretary	Roberto Estoconing
	Councilors	Antonio E. Torres
		Pedrom Timtim
		Pator Carinal
		Margarito Gallosa
		Marcelo Libo-on
		Brigido Sabanal
		Daniel Donaldo
		Benedicto Libo-on, Sr.
1926–1927	President	Fabio Torres
	Vice-president	Daniel Dionaldo
	Secretary	Roberto Estoconing
	Councilors	Brigido Sabanal
		Antonio E. Torres
		Leopoldo Dionaldo
		Aquilino Ricarte
		Pedro E. Torres
		Teodoro Absin
		Felix Camero
