= Jocelyn Sy-Limkaichong =

Filipino politician

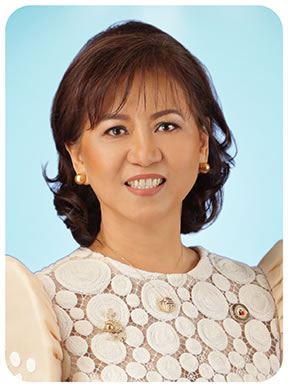
- Official portrait, 2022

Member of the House of Representatives of the Philippines for Negros Oriental's 1st congressional district
- In office June 30, 2016 – June 30, 2025
- Preceded by: Emmanuel M. Iway
- Succeeded by: Emmanuel M. Iway
- In office June 30, 2007 – June 30, 2013
- Preceded by: Jacinto Paras
- Succeeded by: Emmanuel M. Iway

Personal details
- Born: 9 November 1959 (age 66)
- Party: NPC (2024–present)
- Other political affiliations: Liberal (2007–2024)

Jocelyn "Josy" Sy-Limkaichong (born 9 November 1959) is a Filipino politician who was a member of the House of Representatives representing Negros Oriental's 1st congressional district.

== See also ==
- 14th Congress of the Philippines
- 15th Congress of the Philippines
- 16th Congress of the Philippines
- 18th Congress of the Philippines
- 19th Congress of the Philippines
