= Tayasan =

Municipality in Negros Oriental, Philippines

- Municipality
- Municipality of Tayasan
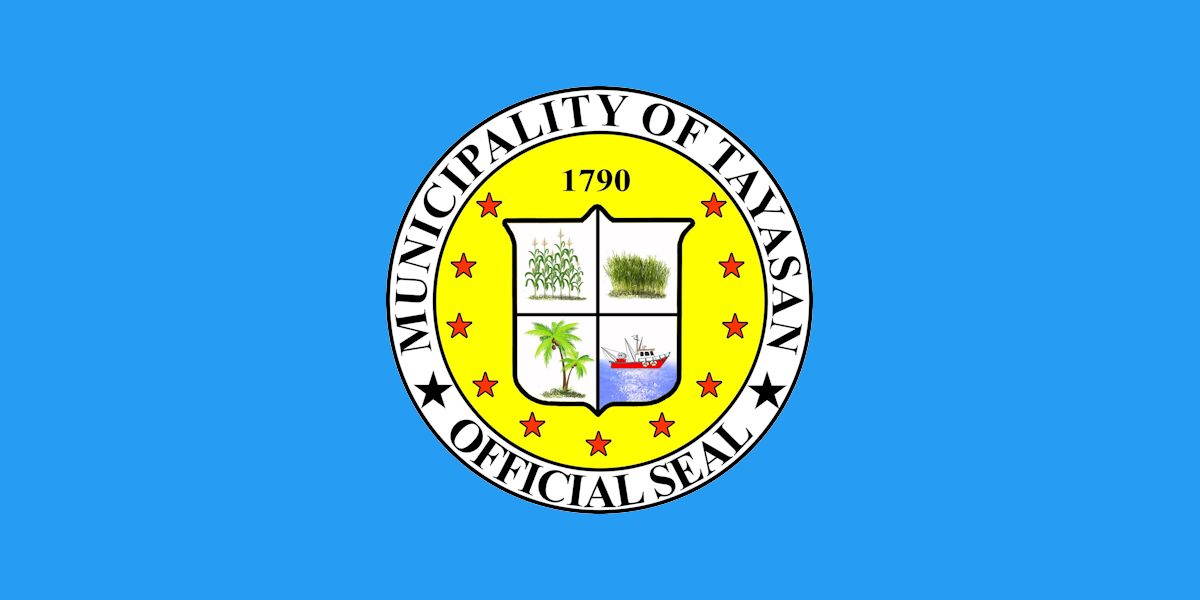
- Flag

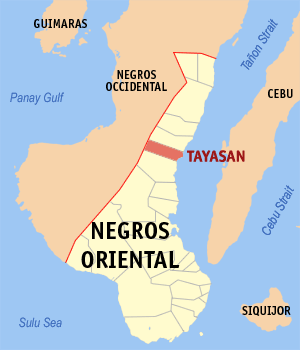
- Map of Negros Oriental with Tayasan highlighted
- Interactive map of Tayasan
- Location within the Philippines
- Coordinates: 9°55′N 123°09′E
- Country: Philippines
- Region: Negros Island Region
- Province: Negros Oriental
- District: 1st district
- Barangays: 28 (see Barangays)

Government
  - Type: Sangguniang Bayan
  - Mayor: Susano Antonio D. Ruperto III (NPC)
  - Vice Mayor: Susano L. Ruperto, Jr. (PFP)
  - Representative: Emmanuel L. Iway (PFP)
  - Municipal Council: Members: Roselito F. Zuniega; Allan E. Luiso; Lady Kyshia L. Marquita; Glivin L. Gabate; Magie Z. Ng; Renato P. Vidal; Belmar N. De Baguio; Sol B. Beton; Arthur L. Dagle ^{‡}; Jan Michael R. Santiago ^{◌}; ‡ ex officio ABC president; ◌ ex officio SK chairman
  - Electorate: 25,498 voters (2025)

Area
  - Total: 154.20 km^{2} (59.54 sq mi)
- Elevation: 93 m (305 ft)
- Highest elevation: 843 m (2,766 ft)
- Lowest elevation: 0 m (0 ft)

Population (2024 census)
  - Total: 39,005
  - Density: 252.95/km^{2} (655.14/sq mi)
  - Households: 9,605

Economy
  - Income class: 2nd municipal income class
  - Poverty incidence: 36.64% (2023)
  - Revenue: ₱ 325.4 million (2024)
  - Assets: ₱ 2,087 million (2024)
  - Expenditure: ₱ 152.2 million (2024)
  - Liabilities: ₱ 110.4 million (2024)

Service provider
  - Electricity: Negros Oriental 1 Electric Cooperative (NORECO 1)
- Time zone: UTC+8 (PST)
- ZIP code: 6211
- PSGC: 074622000
- IDD : area code: +63 (0)35
- Native languages: Cebuano; Tagalog

Tayasan (Cebuano: Lungsod sa Tayasan; Tagalog: Bayan ng Tayasan), officially the Municipality of Tayasan, is a municipality in the province of Negros Oriental, Philippines. According to the 2024 census, it has a population of 39,005 people.

Tayasan is 90 kilometres (56 mi) from Dumaguete.

== Geography ==
=== Barangays ===
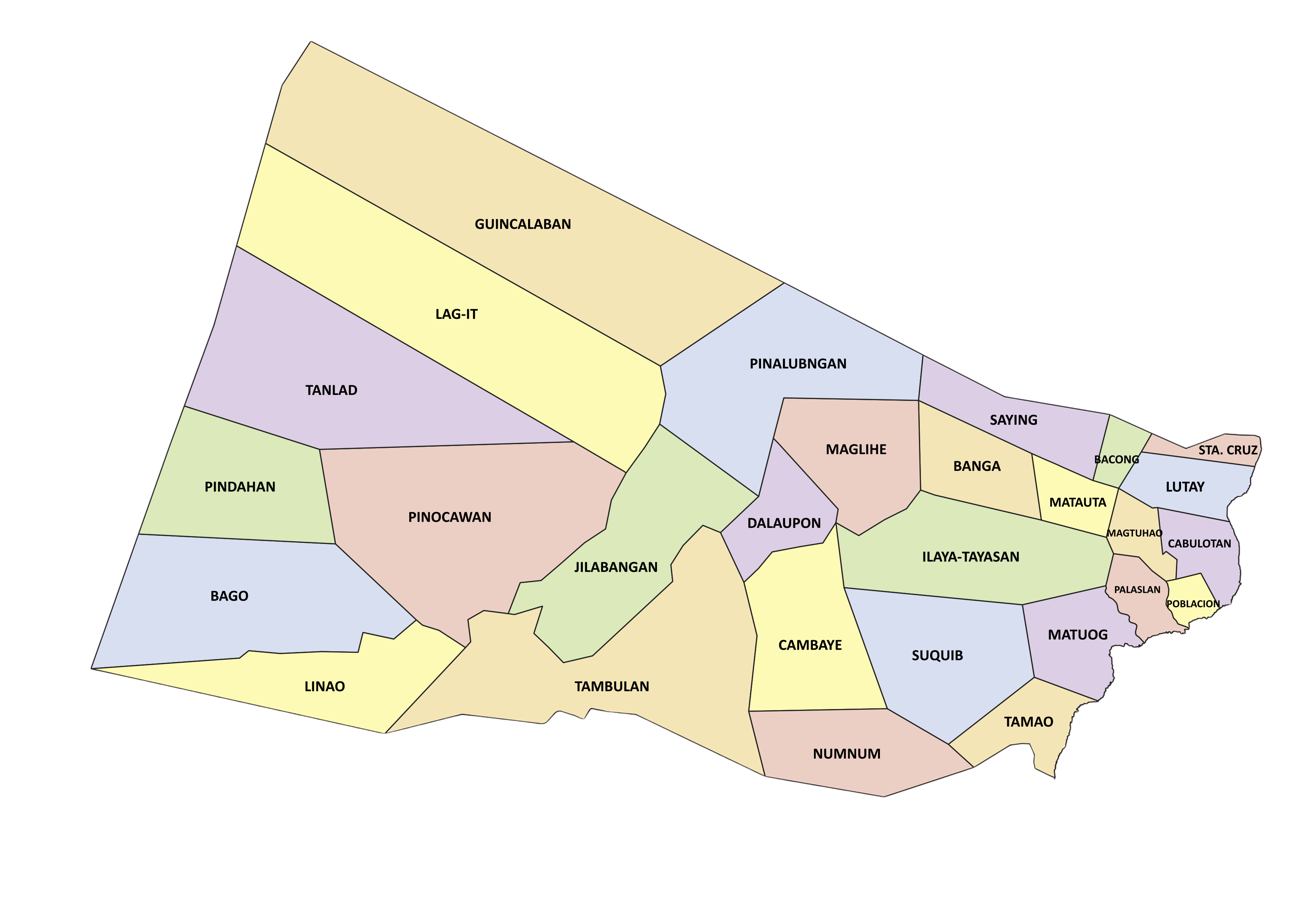
Political map of Tayasan

Tayasan is politically subdivided into 28 barangays. Each barangay consists of puroks and some have sitios.

PSGC	Barangay	Population			±% p.a.	
		2024		2010		
074622001	Bacong	1.0%	393	419	▾	−0.44%
074622002	Bago	7.4%	2,895	2,502	▴	1.02%
074622003	Banga	2.4%	937	972	▾	−0.25%
074622004	Cabulotan	2.2%	876	919	▾	−0.33%
074622005	Cambaye	3.1%	1,224	1,015	▴	1.31%
074622006	Dalaupon	2.1%	822	819	▴	0.03%
074622007	Guincalaban	5.6%	2,190	2,124	▴	0.21%
074622008	Ilaya-Tayasan	2.3%	899	813	▴	0.70%
074622009	Jilabangan	3.2%	1,262	1,162	▴	0.57%
074622010	Lag-it	4.6%	1,808	1,461	▴	1.49%
074622011	Linao	2.8%	1,110	1,152	▾	−0.26%
074622012	Lutay	3.1%	1,207	1,224	▾	−0.10%
074622013	Maglihe	1.6%	613	639	▾	−0.29%
074622014	Matauta	1.8%	694	579	▴	1.27%
074622015	Magtuhao	1.6%	613	508	▴	1.31%
074622016	Matuog	5.4%	2,109	1,938	▴	0.59%
074622017	Numnum	1.2%	466	474	▾	−0.12%
074622018	Palaslan	5.2%	2,041	1,605	▴	1.68%
074622019	Pindahan	6.0%	2,329	1,716	▴	2.14%
074622020	Pinalubngan	2.8%	1,090	1,539	▾	−2.37%
074622021	Pinocawan	5.7%	2,208	1,648	▴	2.05%
074622022	Poblacion	5.9%	2,309	2,070	▴	0.76%
074622023	Santa Cruz	2.1%	829	692	▴	1.26%
074622024	Saying	1.6%	643	547	▴	1.13%
074622025	Suquib	1.8%	688	728	▾	−0.39%
074622026	Tamao	3.8%	1,485	1,410	▴	0.36%
074622027	Tambulan	8.7%	3,410	2,515	▴	2.14%
074622028	Tanlad	2.6%	1,009	1,419	▾	−2.34%
	Total		39,005	34,609	▴	0.83%

=== Climate ===
Climate data for Tayasan, Negros Oriental
Month	Jan	Feb	Mar	Apr	May	Jun	Jul	Aug	Sep	Oct	Nov	Dec	Year
Mean daily maximum °C (°F)	29 (84)	30 (86)	31 (88)	32 (90)	31 (88)	30 (86)	30 (86)	30 (86)	30 (86)	30 (86)	29 (84)	29 (84)	30 (86)
Mean daily minimum °C (°F)	23 (73)	22 (72)	23 (73)	24 (75)	25 (77)	25 (77)	25 (77)	25 (77)	25 (77)	24 (75)	24 (75)	23 (73)	24 (75)
Average precipitation mm (inches)	42 (1.7)	34 (1.3)	40 (1.6)	61 (2.4)	124 (4.9)	188 (7.4)	190 (7.5)	191 (7.5)	189 (7.4)	186 (7.3)	124 (4.9)	73 (2.9)	1,442 (56.8)
Average rainy days	10.0	8.5	9.5	12.8	22.3	26.8	28.4	27.9	27.3	27.6	20.5	13.1	234.7
Source: Meteoblue

== Demographics ==
Population census of Tayasan
Year	Pop.	±% p.a.
1903	5,245	—
1918	13,847	+6.69%
1939	12,814	−0.37%
1948	13,642	+0.70%
1960	19,579	+3.06%
1970	20,132	+0.28%
1975	21,034	+0.88%
1980	21,473	+0.41%
1990	25,749	+1.83%
1995	31,567	+3.89%
2000	30,795	−0.53%
2007	32,383	+0.70%
2010	34,609	+2.45%
2015	35,470	+0.47%
2020	38,159	+1.55%
2024	39,005	+0.53%
Source: Philippine Statistics Authority

== Economy ==
Poverty incidence of Tayasan (%)

Source: Philippine Statistics Authority

== Education ==
The public schools in the town of Tayasan are administered by two school districts under the Schools Division of Negros Oriental.

Elementary schools:

- Bago Elementary School — Bago
- Banga Elementary School — Banga
- Cambaye Elementary School — Cambaye
- Dalaupon Elementary School — Dalaupon
- Guincalaban Elementary School — Guincalaban
- Ilaya-Tayasan Elementary School — Ilaya-Tayasan
- Jilabangan Elementary School — Jilabangan
- Lag-it Elementary School — Lag-it
- Linao Elementary School — Linao
- Lutay Elementary School — Lutay
- Mabigo Elementary School — Sitio Mabigo, Lag-it
- Maglihe Elementary School — Maglihe
- Matauta Elementary School — Matauta
- Matuog Elementary School — Matuog
- Nabilog Elementary School — Sitio Nabilog, Tambulan
- Numnum Elementary School — Numnum
- Pinalubngan Elementary School — Pinalubngan
- Pindahan Elementary School — Pindahan
- Pinocawan Elementary School — Pinocawan
- Sacsac Elementary School — Sitio Sacsac, Bago
- Saying Elementary School — Saying
- Suquib Elementary School — Suquib
- Tabunan Elementary School — Sitio Tabunan, Guincalaban
- Tamao Elementary School — Tamao
- Tambulan Elementary School — Tambulan
- Tanlad Elementary School — Tanlad
- Tayasan Central Elementary School — Nat'l Highway, Poblacion

High schools:

- Bago National High School — Bago
- Matauta Community High School — Matauta
- Pinalubngan National High School — Pinalubngan
- Tambulan Community High School — Tambulan
- Tayasan National High School — Matuog
- Tayasan National Science High School — Matuog

Private schools:

- Saint Anthony Academy — Calijan Street, Poblacion
- Tayasan Institute of the IFI, Inc. — Nat'l Highway, Palaslan
