= Jimalalud =

Municipality in Negros Oriental, Philippines

- Municipality
- Municipality of Jimalalud
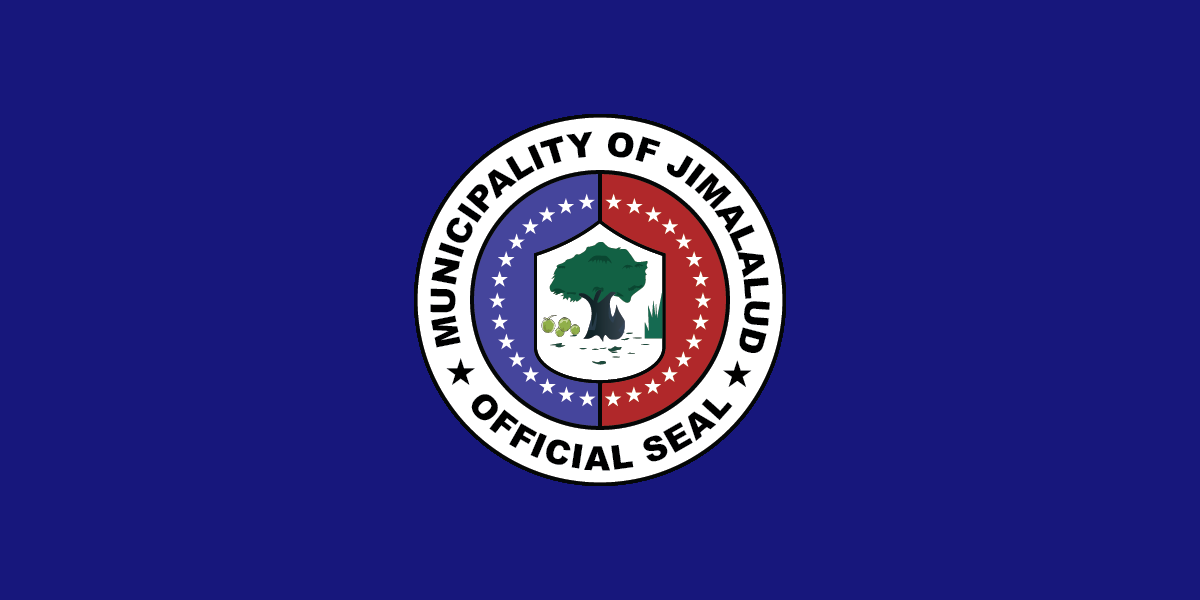
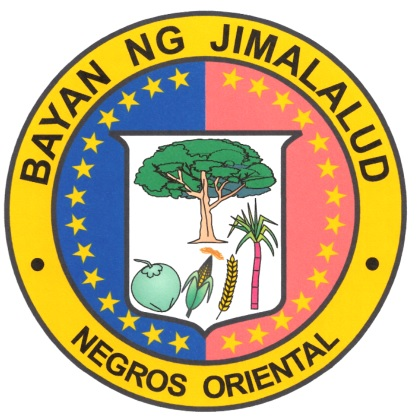
- Flag Seal
- Nickname: Little Big Town
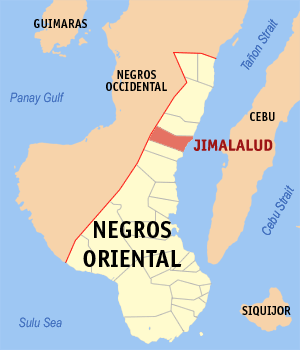
- Map of Negros Oriental with Jimalalud highlighted
- Interactive map of Jimalalud
- Location within the Philippines
- Coordinates: 9°58′47″N 123°12′00″E
- Country: Philippines
- Region: Negros Island Region
- Province: Negros Oriental
- District: 1st district
- Founded: 1798
- Chartered: 1910
- Barangays: 28 (see Barangays)

Government
  - Type: Sangguniang Bayan
  - Mayor: Hazel C. Tuanda (NPC)
  - Vice Mayor: Reynaldo V. Tuanda (NPC)
  - Representative: Emmanuel L. Iway (PFP)
  - Municipal Council: Members: Archie G. Gentiles; Delia T. Estrellanes; Chester V. Lim; Remo Q. Estorco; James Wayne D. Jayme; Reynaldo C. Tuanda, Jr.; George B. Cabatuan, Jr.; Nelson C. Faburada; Shania Monique T. Vidal ^{◌}; ◌ ex officio SK chairman
  - Electorate: 22,038 voters (2025)

Area
  - Total: 139.50 km^{2} (53.86 sq mi)
- Elevation: 89 m (292 ft)
- Highest elevation: 734 m (2,408 ft)
- Lowest elevation: 0 m (0 ft)

Population (2024 census)
  - Total: 32,996
  - Density: 236.53/km^{2} (612.61/sq mi)
  - Households: 8,005

Economy
  - Income class: 3rd municipal income class
  - Poverty incidence: 34.61% (2023)
  - Revenue: ₱ 167 million (2024)
  - Assets: ₱ 610.1 million (2024)
  - Expenditure: ₱ 128 million (2024)

Service provider
  - Electricity: Negros Oriental 1 Electric Cooperative (NORECO 1)
- Time zone: UTC+8 (PST)
- ZIP code: 6212
- PSGC: 074612000
- IDD : area code: +63 (0)35
- Native languages: Cebuano; Tagalog
- Website: https://www.jimalalud.gov.ph

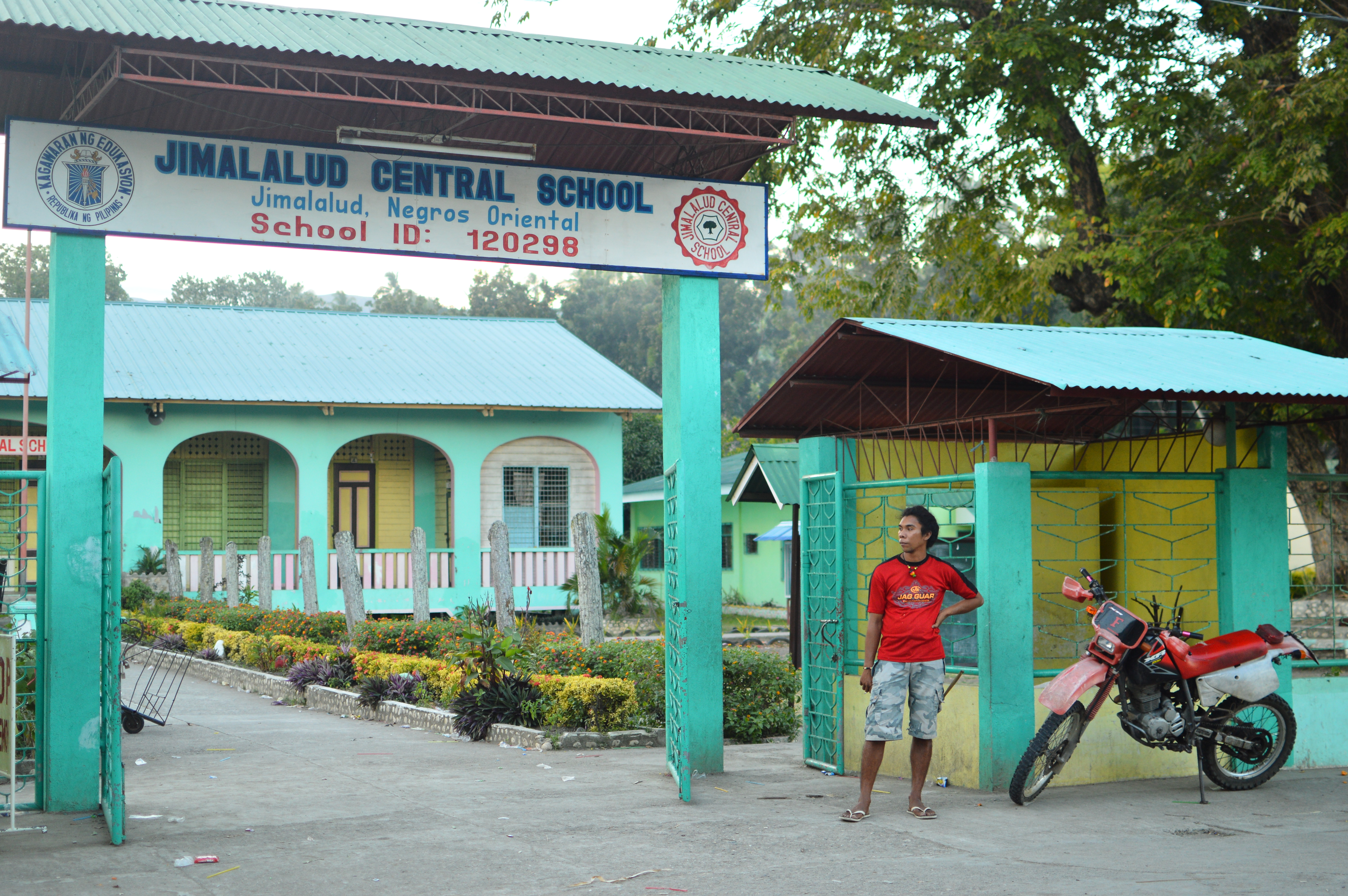
1946 Jimalalud Central School (South Poblacion)

Jimalalud, officially the Municipality of Jimalalud (Cebuano: Lungsod sa Jimalalud; Tagalog: Bayan ng Jimalalud), is a municipality in the province of Negros Oriental, Philippines. According to the 2024 census, it has a population of 32,996 people.

== History ==
Jimalalud was founded in 1797 as part of Tayasan. In 1910, it was separated from Tayasan and became an independent municipality. Its name was also spelled as "Gimalalud" during the Spanish era.

Boundless sugar cane fields, typical of the northern landscape, fill the lush lands of Jimalalud most months of the year. It has reported rich deposits of coal, copper, iron and related compounds of magnetite, pyrites and marcasite, but the lodes remain untouched.

In the late 1800s the Recollects built here a convent of hardwoods, an imposing structure that was reputed to be the biggest convent in the Province for over a quarter of a century. The Revolution against Spain compelled the friars to leave and the convent fell into disrepair. Jimalalud was made a town independent of Tayasan in 1910. In 1944 World War II guerillas burned down the entire town, leaving Jimalalud without a historical landmark standing. Barrio Bankal was the seat of the 7th District Government during World War II.

Most times, Jimalalud is serene and green, and the plaza is the public space for the town's pastoral ambience.

The town was also the epicenter of the 2012 Negros earthquake.

== Geography ==
Jimalalud has a land area of 139.50 square kilometres (53.86 sq mi). It is located 97 kilometres (60 mi) from Dumaguete, the province's capital. The town is bounded by La Libertad to the north and Tayasan in the south. It faces the Tañon Strait in the east while the eastern part is mostly the mountainous part of the municipality.

=== Barangays ===
Jimalalud is politically subdivided into 28 barangays. Each barangay consists of puroks and some have sitios.

The barangays North and South Poblacion serve as the center of governance, trade & commerce.

PSGC	Barangay	Population			±% p.a.	
		2024		2010		
074612001	Aglahug	2.5%	813	639	▴	1.68%
074612002	Agutayon	1.5%	499	446	▴	0.78%
074612003	Apanangon	7.6%	2,524	2,177	▴	1.03%
074612004	Bae	3.0%	1,003	929	▴	0.53%
074612005	Bala-as	1.4%	466	497	▾	−0.44%
074612006	Bangcal	3.5%	1,167	1,017	▴	0.96%
074612007	Banog	2.6%	846	862	▾	−0.13%
074612008	Buto	2.4%	778	563	▴	2.26%
074612009	Cabang	1.5%	502	438	▴	0.95%
074612010	Camandayon	2.9%	960	754	▴	1.68%
074612011	Cangharay	3.6%	1,181	1,387	▾	−1.11%
074612012	Canlahao	1.5%	481	481	Steady	0.00%
074612013	Dayoyo	6.6%	2,175	1,623	▴	2.05%
074612015	Lacaon	3.5%	1,147	1,281	▾	−0.76%
074612016	Mahanlud	2.7%	903	845	▴	0.46%
074612017	Malabago	1.6%	515	402	▴	1.73%
074612018	Mambaid	2.5%	822	740	▴	0.73%
074612019	Mongpong	3.0%	980	801	▴	1.41%
074612023	North Poblacion	3.7%	1,229	1,211	▴	0.10%
074612020	Owacan	4.9%	1,624	1,367	▴	1.20%
074612021	Pacuan	5.9%	1,962	1,599	▴	1.43%
074612022	Panglaya-an	3.5%	1,158	1,098	▴	0.37%
074612025	Polopantao	4.3%	1,411	1,307	▴	0.53%
074612026	Sampiniton	4.2%	1,388	1,442	▾	−0.26%
074612024	South Poblacion	6.0%	1,995	1,606	▴	1.51%
074612027	Talamban	2.1%	700	725	▾	−0.24%
074612028	Tamao	4.0%	1,318	1,319	▾	−0.01%
074612014	Yli (Eli)	5.2%	1,709	1,488	▴	0.96%
	Total		32,996	29,044	▴	0.89%

=== Climate ===
Climate data for Jimalalud, Negros Oriental
Month	Jan	Feb	Mar	Apr	May	Jun	Jul	Aug	Sep	Oct	Nov	Dec	Year
Mean daily maximum °C (°F)	29 (84)	30 (86)	31 (88)	32 (90)	31 (88)	30 (86)	30 (86)	30 (86)	30 (86)	30 (86)	29 (84)	29 (84)	30 (86)
Mean daily minimum °C (°F)	23 (73)	22 (72)	23 (73)	24 (75)	25 (77)	25 (77)	25 (77)	25 (77)	25 (77)	24 (75)	24 (75)	23 (73)	24 (75)
Average precipitation mm (inches)	42 (1.7)	34 (1.3)	40 (1.6)	61 (2.4)	124 (4.9)	188 (7.4)	190 (7.5)	191 (7.5)	189 (7.4)	186 (7.3)	124 (4.9)	73 (2.9)	1,442 (56.8)
Average rainy days	10.0	8.5	9.5	12.8	22.3	26.8	28.4	27.9	27.3	27.6	20.5	13.1	234.7
Source: Meteoblue

== Demographics ==
Population census of Jimalalud

Year	Pop.	±% p.a.
1903	3,613	—
1918	17,828	+11.23%
1939	14,553	−0.96%
1948	14,639	+0.07%
1960	16,572	+1.04%
1970	18,568	+1.14%
1975	19,036	+0.50%
1980	18,863	−0.18%

Year	Pop.	±% p.a.
1990	22,089	+1.59%
1995	23,514	+1.18%
2000	26,756	+2.81%
2007	27,728	+0.49%
2010	29,044	+1.70%
2015	30,945	+1.21%
2020	32,256	+0.88%
2024	32,996	+0.55%

Source: Philippine Statistics Authority

== Economy ==
Poverty incidence of Jimalalud (%)

Source: Philippine Statistics Authority

The annual regular revenue of Jimalalud for the fiscal year of 2016 was ₱86,004,882.49, according to the record from the Bureau of Local Government Finance.

== Culture ==
=== Hambabalud Festival ===
Each 13-15th day of January, the town celebrated its annual fiesta with "Sinulog de Jimalalud" as one of the highlight event. The pageantry of its revived Sinulog keeps Jimalalud's religious and cultural heritage alive in a colorful way. Fiesta time and other special occasions usually bring on the town's stallions for the spectacle of the Paaway sa Kabayo.

== Education ==
The public schools in the town of Jimalalud are administered by two school districts under the Schools Division of Negros Oriental.

Elementary schools:

- Aglahug Elementary School — Aglahug
- Agutayon Primary School — Agutayon
- Apanangon Elementary School — Apanangon
- Bae Elementary School — Bae
- Balaas Primary School — Bala-as
- Bangcal Elementary School — Bangcal
- Banog Elementary School — Banog
- Buto Primary School — Buto
- Cabang Elementary School — Cabang
- Camandayon Elementary School — Camandayon
- Cangharay Elementary School — Cangharay
- Irene Elementary School — Sitio Irene, Apanangon
- Jimalalud Central School — Feb 25 Revolution Street, South Poblacion
- Lacaon Elementary School — Lacaon
- Mahanlod Elementary School — Mahanlud
- Malabago Elementary School — Malabago
- Mambaid Elementary School — Mambaid
- Mongpong Primary School — Mongpong
- Owacan Elementary School — Owacan
- Pacuan Elementary School — Pacuan
- Sampiniton Elementary School — Sampiniton
- Talamban Elementary School — Talamban
- Tamao Elementary School — Tamao
- Yli Elementary School — Yli

High schools:

- Bangcal High School — Bangcal
- Jimalalud National High School — Nat'l Highway, South Poblacion
- Jimalalud NHS - Tamao Extension — Tamao
- Owacan Provincial Community High School — Owacan

Private schools:

- Holy Infant Jesus Learning Center of Jimalalud, Inc. — South Poblacion
- Infant King Academy — Nat'l Highway, South Poblacion
- Jimalalud Christian Children Academy, Inc. — South Poblacion
- Kiddieville Learning Center, Inc. — North Poblacion
