= Ayungon =

Municipality in Negros Oriental, Philippines

Ayungon Lungsod sa Ayungon
- Municipality
- Municipality of Ayungon
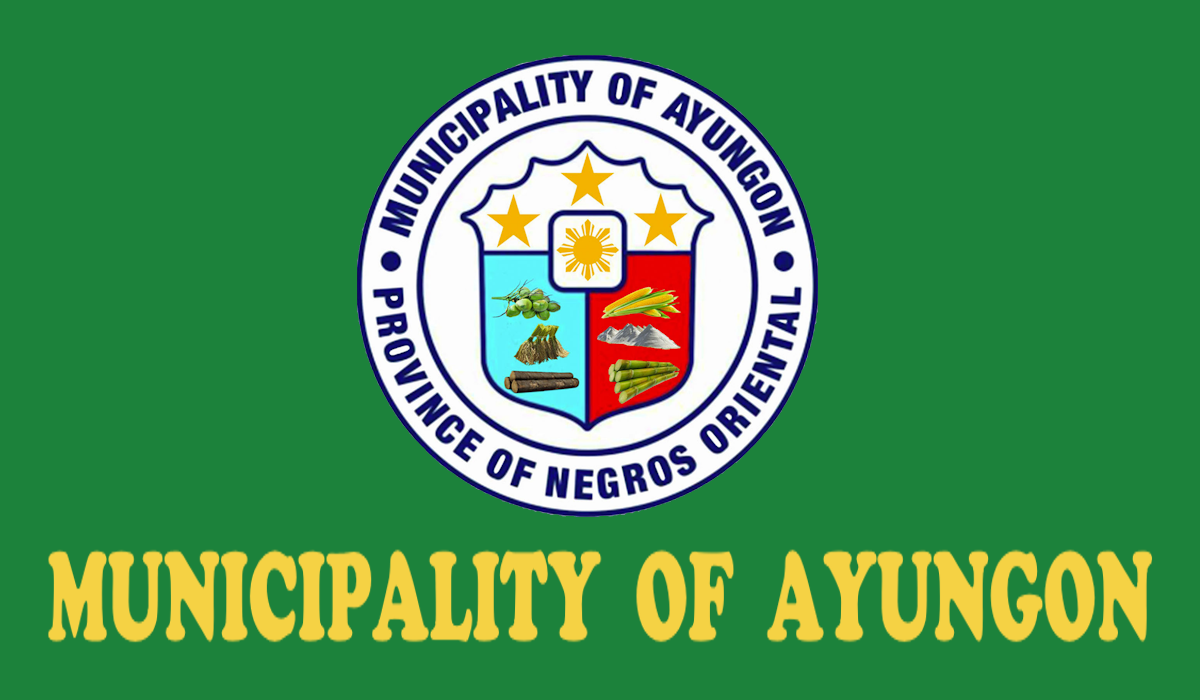
- Flag

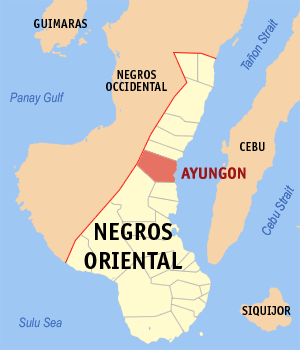
- Map of Negros Oriental with Ayungon highlighted
- Interactive map of Ayungon
- Location within the Philippines
- Coordinates: 9°51′30″N 123°08′48″E
- Country: Philippines
- Region: Negros Island Region
- Province: Negros Oriental
- District: 1st district
- Established: June 1924
- Barangays: 24 (see Barangays)

Government
  - Type: Sangguniang Bayan
  - Mayor: Dennis N. Amancio (NPC)
  - Vice Mayor: Nelda A. Favillaran (PFP)
  - Representative: Emmanuel L. Iway (PFP)
  - Municipal Council: Members: Kizzle Mae D. Opada; Gerryl B. Opada; Roger O. Baldado; Keith B. Enardecido; Rizaldy N. Gumba; Joseph A. Dayahan; Wilfelito B. Arinaza; Romulo P. Alforque; Ramel L. Mandate ^{‡}; Wilfe Jun Arinaza ^{◌}; ‡ ex officio ABC president; ◌ ex officio SK chairman
  - Electorate: 32,173 voters (2025)

Area
  - Total: 265.10 km^{2} (102.36 sq mi)
- Elevation: 112 m (367 ft)
- Highest elevation: 669 m (2,195 ft)
- Lowest elevation: 0 m (0 ft)

Population (2024 census)
  - Total: 50,688
  - Density: 191.20/km^{2} (495.21/sq mi)
  - Households: 11,443

Economy
  - Income class: 1st municipal income class
  - Poverty incidence: 40.87% (2023)
  - Revenue: ₱ 238.8 million (2024)
  - Assets: ₱ 747.7 million (2024)
  - Expenditure: ₱ 154.7 million (2024)
  - Liabilities: ₱ 87.86 million (2024)

Service provider
  - Electricity: Negros Oriental 1 Electric Cooperative (NORECO 1)
- Time zone: UTC+8 (PST)
- ZIP code: 6210
- PSGC: 074602000
- IDD : area code: +63 (0)35
- Native languages: Cebuano; Tagalog
- Website: www.ayungon.gov.ph

Ayungon (Cebuano: Lungsod sa Ayungon; Tagalog: Bayan ng Ayungon), officially the Municipality of Ayungon, is a municipality in the province of Negros Oriental, Philippines. According to the 2024 census, it has a population of 50,688 people.

Attractions include the Karalaon Bird Sanctuary,the subterranean area of the Mabato Caves, a man-made lake in Banban, and the Pagsalsalan Twin Falls (Maaslum Falls).

== Etymology ==
There are at least two explanations for the origin of the name Ayungon. According to Dr. Timoteo S. Oracion of Silliman University, it may date back to the pre-colonial period, when places were often named after prominent individuals. In this case, the locality was associated with a fisherman named Ayung, whose dwelling served as a resting place for travelers. The area came to be known as “Ayung’s place,” which later evolved into Ayungon with the addition of the suffix “-on.”

Another account suggests that the name resulted from a misunderstanding between Spanish visitors and a local resident. When asked for the name of the place, the native, who was cutting a tree, thought he was being asked his name and replied “Ayung.” When asked again, he assumed the question referred to the tree and answered “Dungon.” The Spaniards reportedly combined the two responses into “Ayung-Dungon,” which was eventually shortened to Ayungon.

== History ==
During the Spanish regime, the original town plaza was located at the beach, which was transferred further inland due to a massive flood. The town also suffered an epidemic of smallpox which took away two-thirds of the town's population. Old municipal profiles refer to Ayungon as Todos los Santos, though there are no legends to explain that Hispanic name, just as there are no tales elaborating on the ruins of apparently Hispanic fortifications on the Tampocon II shoreline, perhaps because Ayungon's colonial past was not entirely its own. For many years, it was a mere barrio of Tayasan, until 1924 when Governor General Leonard Wood came to establish Ayungon as a full-fledged municipality through the recommendation of the then-provincial governor, Enrique Villanueva.

During World War II, numerous houses were burned, as well as people being tortured and killed. Many of them died due to famine and malaria. Maximo Romano Enardecido, the mayor at the time, evacuated the municipal government to Pangi, a mountainous village located south of the Poblacion. Captain Eugenio “Kusgan” Antonio led the town's guerilla movement. The town was liberated in October 1944, and the Americans came in to rehabilitate the town by lending money to pay for war damages.

== Geography ==
82 kilometres (51 mi) from the provincial capital Dumaguete, Ayungon is located on the midriff of Oriental Negros’ northern stretch, nearly two hours from Dumaguete.

Of only three virgin forests said to be still remaining on Negros Island, one is located in barangay Banban.

=== Barangays ===
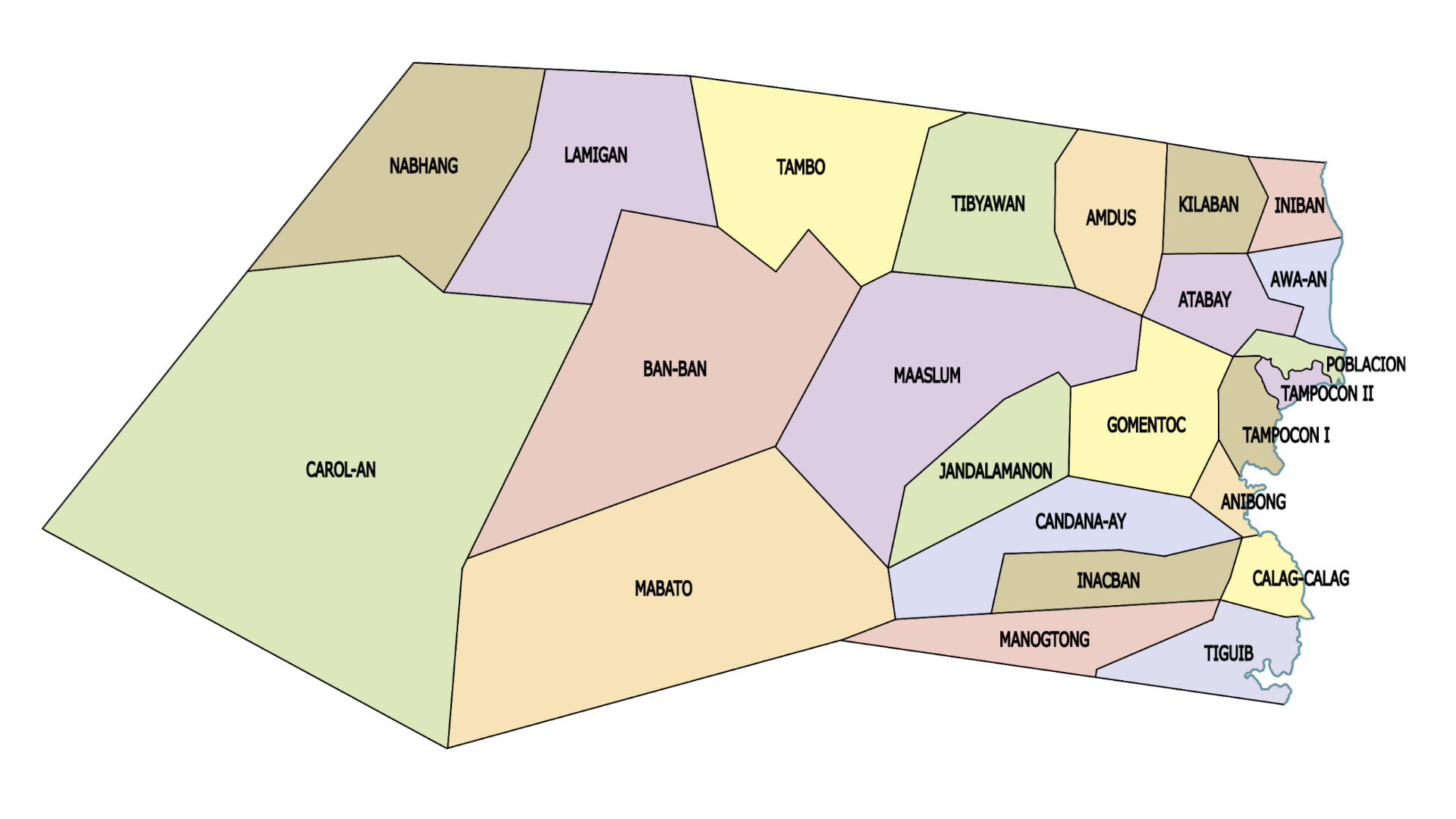
Barangays of Ayungon.

Ayungon is politically subdivided into 24 barangays. Each barangay consists of puroks and some have sitios.

PSGC	Barangay	Population			±% p.a.	
		2024		2010		
074602001	Amdus	2.1%	1,049	1,407	▾	−2.02%
074602003	Anibong	4.1%	2,102	2,131	▾	−0.10%
074602004	Atabay	2.8%	1,398	1,225	▴	0.92%
074602005	Awa-an	5.4%	2,718	2,474	▴	0.66%
074602006	Ban-ban	5.2%	2,622	2,299	▴	0.92%
074602007	Calagcalag	3.4%	1,718	1,711	▴	0.03%
074602008	Candana-ay	2.2%	1,098	1,958	▾	−3.94%
074602009	Carol-an	6.7%	3,375	2,899	▴	1.06%
074602010	Gomentoc	4.3%	2,173	2,065	▴	0.36%
074602011	Inacban	3.6%	1,803	1,588	▴	0.89%
074602012	Iniban	2.6%	1,298	1,273	▴	0.14%
074602002	Jandalamanon	2.2%	1,107	1,167	▾	−0.37%
074602013	Kilaban	1.5%	744	846	▾	−0.89%
074602014	Lamigan	2.4%	1,195	844	▴	2.45%
074602015	Maaslum	3.4%	1,741	1,799	▾	−0.23%
074602016	Mabato	6.2%	3,164	3,253	▾	−0.19%
074602017	Manogtong	2.7%	1,348	1,603	▾	−1.20%
074602018	Nabhang	2.4%	1,228	1,463	▾	−1.21%
074602024	Poblacion	4.0%	2,036	1,837	▴	0.72%
074602019	Tambo	8.3%	4,189	3,188	▴	1.92%
074602020	Tampocon I	4.2%	2,127	1,944	▴	0.63%
074602021	Tampocon II	4.3%	2,196	2,674	▾	−1.36%
074602022	Tibyawan	3.5%	1,797	1,867	▾	−0.27%
074602023	Tiguib	5.7%	2,876	2,631	▴	0.62%
	Total		50,688	46,146	▴	0.66%

=== Climate ===
Climate data for Ayungon, Negros Oriental
Month	Jan	Feb	Mar	Apr	May	Jun	Jul	Aug	Sep	Oct	Nov	Dec	Year
Mean daily maximum °C (°F)	29 (84)	30 (86)	31 (88)	32 (90)	31 (88)	30 (86)	30 (86)	30 (86)	30 (86)	30 (86)	29 (84)	29 (84)	30 (86)
Mean daily minimum °C (°F)	23 (73)	22 (72)	23 (73)	24 (75)	25 (77)	25 (77)	25 (77)	25 (77)	25 (77)	24 (75)	24 (75)	23 (73)	24 (75)
Average precipitation mm (inches)	42 (1.7)	34 (1.3)	40 (1.6)	61 (2.4)	124 (4.9)	188 (7.4)	190 (7.5)	191 (7.5)	189 (7.4)	186 (7.3)	124 (4.9)	73 (2.9)	1,442 (56.8)
Average rainy days	10.0	8.5	9.5	12.8	22.3	26.8	28.4	27.9	27.3	27.6	20.5	13.1	234.7
Source: Meteoblue (modeled/calculated data, not measured locally)

== Demographics ==
Population census of Ayungon

Year	Pop.	±% p.a.
1939	12,777	—
1948	14,797	+1.64%
1960	21,539	+3.18%
1970	23,165	+0.73%
1975	23,639	+0.41%
1980	27,656	+3.19%
1990	33,317	+1.88%

Year	Pop.	±% p.a.
1995	36,928	+1.95%
2000	40,744	+2.13%
2007	42,643	+0.63%
2010	46,146	+2.91%
2015	46,303	+0.06%
2020	47,102	+0.36%
2024	50,688	+1.78%

Source: Philippine Statistics Authority

== Economy ==
Poverty incidence of Ayungon

Source: Philippine Statistics Authority

Ayungon is mostly rural with vast rice fields, dense coconut groves and expansive plantations of sugar cane, bananas and pineapple.

As of May 2025, the once quiet town is starting to commercialize by bringing in numerous known international and national businesses in its Poblacion.

As the town is growing economically, it has been conferred with the status of 1st class income municipality.

== Education ==
The public schools in the town of Ayungon are administered by two school districts under the Schools Division of Negros Oriental.

Elementary schools:

- Amdus Elementary School — Amdus
- Anibong Elementary School — Anibong
- Awa-an Elementary School — Awa-an
- Ayungon Central Elementary School — Nat'l Highway, Poblacion
- Banban Elementary School — Banban
- Buenavista Elementary School — Atabay
- Calagcalag Elementary School — Calagcalag
- Candana-ay Elementary School — Candana-ay
- Canlukduhan Elementary School — Sitio Canlukduhan, Gomentoc
- Carol-an Elementary School — Carol-an
- Duli-Duli Elementary School — Sitio Duli-Duli, Tibyawan
- Gomentoc Elementary School — Gomentoc
- Inacban Elementary School — Inacban
- Iniban Elementary School — Iniban
- Jandalamanon Elementary School — Jandalamanon
- Kilaban Elementary School — Kilaban
- Lamigan Elementary School — Lamigan
- Libtacon Elementary School — Sitio Libtacon, Banban
- Maaslum Elementary School — Maaslum
- Mabato Elementary School — Mabato
- Manogtong Elementary School — Manogtong
- Nabalian Elementary School — Sitio Nabalian, Carol-an
- Nabhang Elementary School — Nabhang
- So-ok Elementary School — Sitio So-ok, Mabato
- South Poblacion Elementary School — Nat'l Highway, Tampocon II
- Talanyog Elementary School — Sitio Talanyog, Carol-an
- Tambo Elementary School — Tambo
- Tampocon I Elementary School — Tampocon I
- Tibyawan Elementary School — Tibyawan
- Tiguib Elementary School — Tiguib
- Tumampon Elementary School — Sitio Tumampon, Tiguib

High schools:

- Ayungon National High School — Nat'l Highway, Tampocon I
- Ayungon NHS - Carol-an Extension — Carol-an
- Ayungon Science High School — Todos Los Santos Street, Tampocon II
- Mabato Provincial Community High School — Mabato
- Tambo National High School — Tambo

Private schools:

- Negros Academy-Negros College, Inc. — Enardecido Street, Tampocon II
