= Amlan =

Municipality in Negros Oriental, Philippines

Amlan New Ayuquitan
- Municipality
- Municipality of Amlan
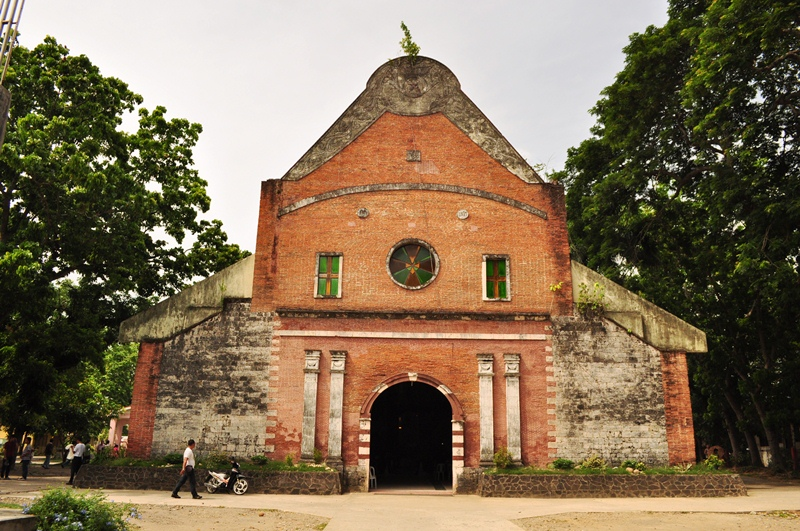
- Church of Amlan

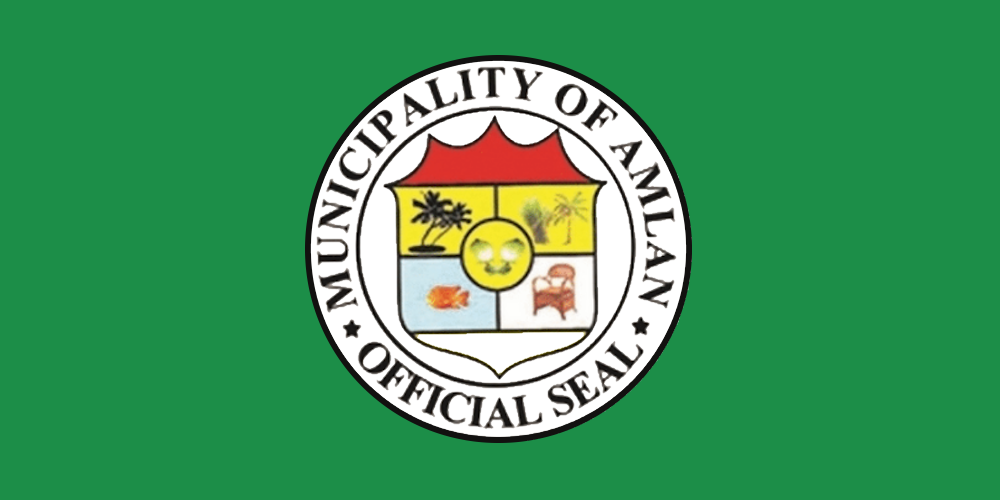
- Flag

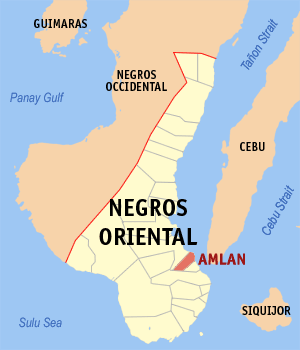
- Map of Negros Oriental with Amlan highlighted
- Interactive map of Amlan
- Location within the Philippines
- Coordinates: 9°27′52″N 123°13′25″E
- Country: Philippines
- Region: Negros Island Region
- Province: Negros Oriental
- District: 2nd district
- Barangays: 8 (see Barangays)

Government
  - Type: Sangguniang Bayan
  - Mayor: Manuel Jose C. Sycip (NPC)
  - Vice Mayor: Allan Marie R. Tan (NPC)
  - Representative: Maisa Sagarbarria (Lakas)
  - Municipal Council: Members: Anna Jay O. Mariot; Jacqueline S. Tan; Edwin A. Omoso; Emelyn B. Rosales; Ana Linda E. Esparcia; Ninfa R. Panot; Julie A. Sibul; Glendon D. Nochefranca; Sherlyn Sycip ^{‡}; Crislaine T. Jugilon ^{◌}; ‡ ex officio ABC president; ◌ ex officio SK chairman
  - Electorate: 18,847 voters (2025)

Area
  - Total: 111.85 km^{2} (43.19 sq mi)
- Elevation: 29 m (95 ft)
- Highest elevation: 334 m (1,096 ft)
- Lowest elevation: 0 m (0 ft)

Population (2024 census)
  - Total: 26,566
  - Density: 237.51/km^{2} (615.16/sq mi)
  - Households: 6,158

Economy
  - Income class: 3rd municipal income class
  - Poverty incidence: 20.77% (2023)
  - Revenue: ₱ 148.9 million (2023)
  - Assets: ₱ 370.7 million (2023)
  - Expenditure: ₱ 73.7 million (2023)
  - Liabilities: ₱ 100.2 million (2023)

Service provider
  - Electricity: Negros Oriental 2 Electric Cooperative (NORECO 2)
- Time zone: UTC+8 (PST)
- ZIP code: 6203
- PSGC: 074601000
- IDD : area code: +63 (0)35
- Native languages: Cebuano; Tagalog
- Website: www.amlan.gov.ph

Amlan, officially the Municipality of Amlan (Cebuano: Lungsod sa Amlan; Tagalog: Bayan ng Amlan), is a municipality in the province of Negros Oriental, Philippines. According to the 2024 census, it has a population of 26,566 people.

== History ==
Nineteenth-century chronicler Licinio Ruiz referred to a settlement called Alman, which was reportedly named after a superior variety of guava. By 1818, Spanish records indicate that the area had 640 tributes, corresponding to a population of 3,281 residents, including 155 Spanish-Filipino tribute-paying families.

The town became an independent parish separate from Tanjay in 1848. It was later renamed New Ayuquitan in 1912, before being officially renamed Amlan through Republic Act No. 435 on June 7, 1950.

== Heritage structures ==
The Church of St. Andrew the Apostle, completed in 1853 and believed to have taken 50 years to construct, serves as the centerpiece of the town’s tourism and offers a notable example of colonial-era architecture.

Remains of watchtowers built as defenses against Moro raids can still be found in Buswang and near the mouth of the Amlan River, as well as in areas near the school building of Ayuquitan and in Barangay Calo.

== Geography ==
Amlan is 21 kilometres (13 mi) from Dumaguete and 194 kilometres (121 mi) from Bacolod.

=== Barangays ===
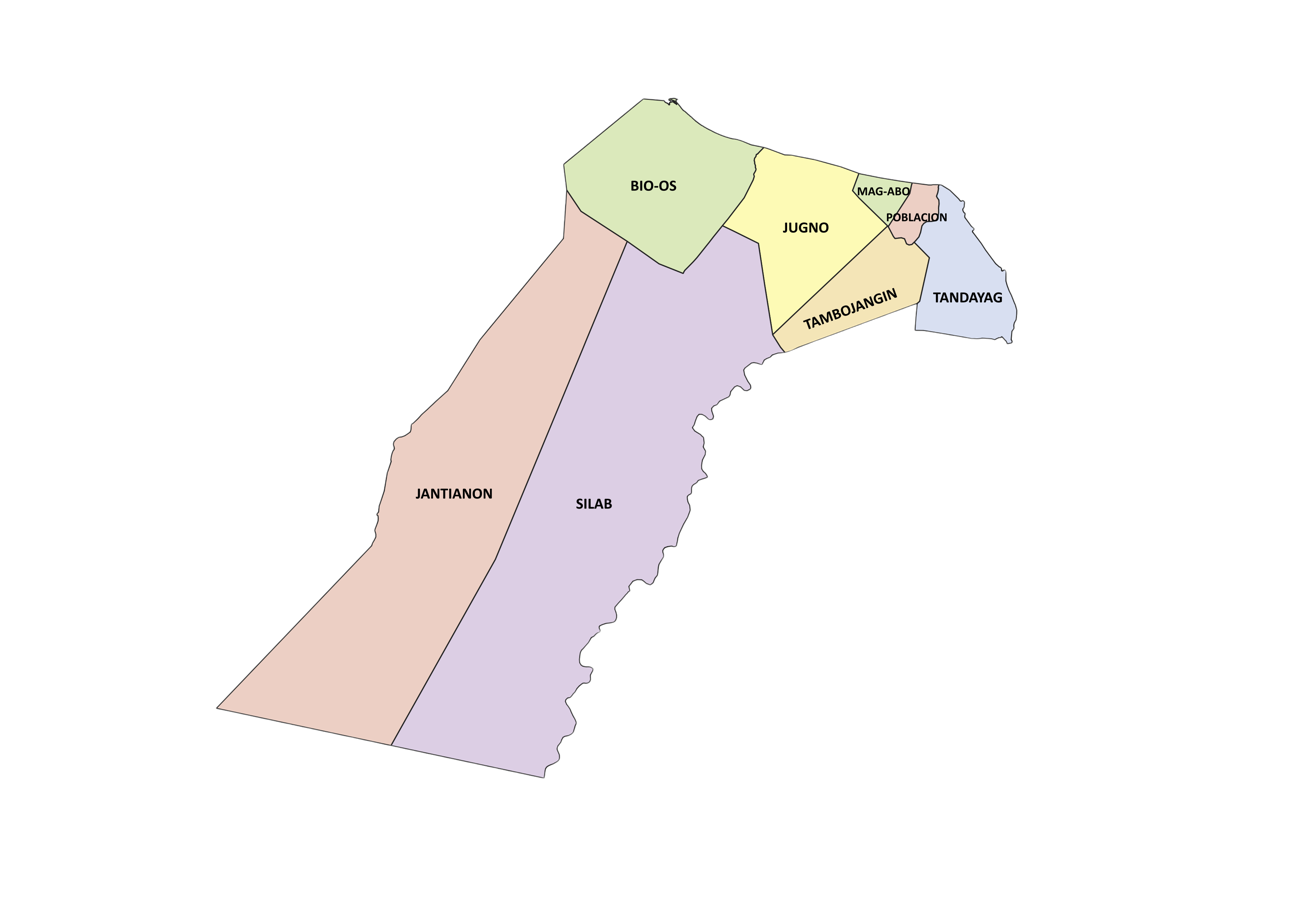
Political map of Amlan

Amlan is politically subdivided into 8 barangays. Each barangay consists of puroks and some have sitios.

PSGC	Barangay	Population			±% p.a.	
		2024		2010		
074601001	Bio-os	15.5%	4,106	3,235	▴	1.67%
074601002	Jantianon	10.9%	2,893	2,791	▴	0.25%
074601003	Jugno	16.1%	4,280	3,832	▴	0.77%
074601004	Mag-abo	8.2%	2,175	1,779	▴	1.41%
074601005	Poblacion	5.5%	1,452	1,425	▴	0.13%
074601006	Silab	16.6%	4,416	3,249	▴	2.16%
074601007	Tambojangin	8.6%	2,278	2,257	▴	0.06%
074601008	Tandayag	14.7%	3,913	3,638	▴	0.51%
	Total		26,566	22,206	▴	1.26%

=== Climate ===
Climate data for Amlan, Negros Oriental
Month	Jan	Feb	Mar	Apr	May	Jun	Jul	Aug	Sep	Oct	Nov	Dec	Year
Mean daily maximum °C (°F)	30 (86)	30 (86)	31 (88)	33 (91)	32 (90)	31 (88)	30 (86)	30 (86)	30 (86)	29 (84)	30 (86)	30 (86)	31 (87)
Mean daily minimum °C (°F)	22 (72)	22 (72)	22 (72)	23 (73)	24 (75)	25 (77)	24 (75)	24 (75)	24 (75)	24 (75)	23 (73)	23 (73)	23 (74)
Average precipitation mm (inches)	26 (1.0)	22 (0.9)	28 (1.1)	41 (1.6)	95 (3.7)	136 (5.4)	147 (5.8)	126 (5.0)	132 (5.2)	150 (5.9)	98 (3.9)	46 (1.8)	1,047 (41.3)
Average rainy days	7.5	6.7	8.9	10.4	21.6	25.6	26.3	25.0	24.1	26.2	19.2	12.1	213.6
Source: Meteoblue (Use with caution: this is modeled/calculated data, not measured locally.)

== Demographics ==
Population census of Amlan
Year	Pop.	±% p.a.
1903	10,373	—
1918	12,525	+1.26%
1939	14,904	+0.83%
1948	13,342	−1.22%
1960	9,399	−2.88%
1970	11,547	+2.08%
1975	12,457	+1.53%
1980	13,638	+1.83%
1990	16,145	+1.70%
1995	16,573	+0.49%
2000	19,227	+3.24%
2007	22,173	+1.99%
2010	22,206	+0.05%
2015	23,624	+1.19%
2020	25,513	+1.63%
2024	26,566	+0.98%
Source: Philippine Statistics Authority

== Economy ==
Poverty incidence of Amlan

Source: Philippine Statistics Authority

== Tourism ==
Amlan is home to many natural and man-made attractions:

Dreamland Nature and Adventure Park (DNAP)
A ten-minute ride away from the highway, DNAP is divided into two parks: the Animal Kingdom that showcases a collection of wildlife and other endangered species and the Adventure Park for those wanting some adrenaline rush. Activities in the Adventure Park include aerial walk, river tubing, and soon to be opened avatar zip line, tandem zip line and giant tandem swing.

Tandayag Marine Sanctuary
Touted as one of Tanon Strait's top sanctuaries, the sanctuary has not seen yet an overcrowding of scuba divers. The fisherfolk managing the area is keen in sustaining the carrying capacity of the marine reserve.

Bio-os Takot-Diot Sanctuary
The second center piece to Amlan's sustained efforts to marine conservation, Takot Diot is just a short hop from the coastline in Bio-os.

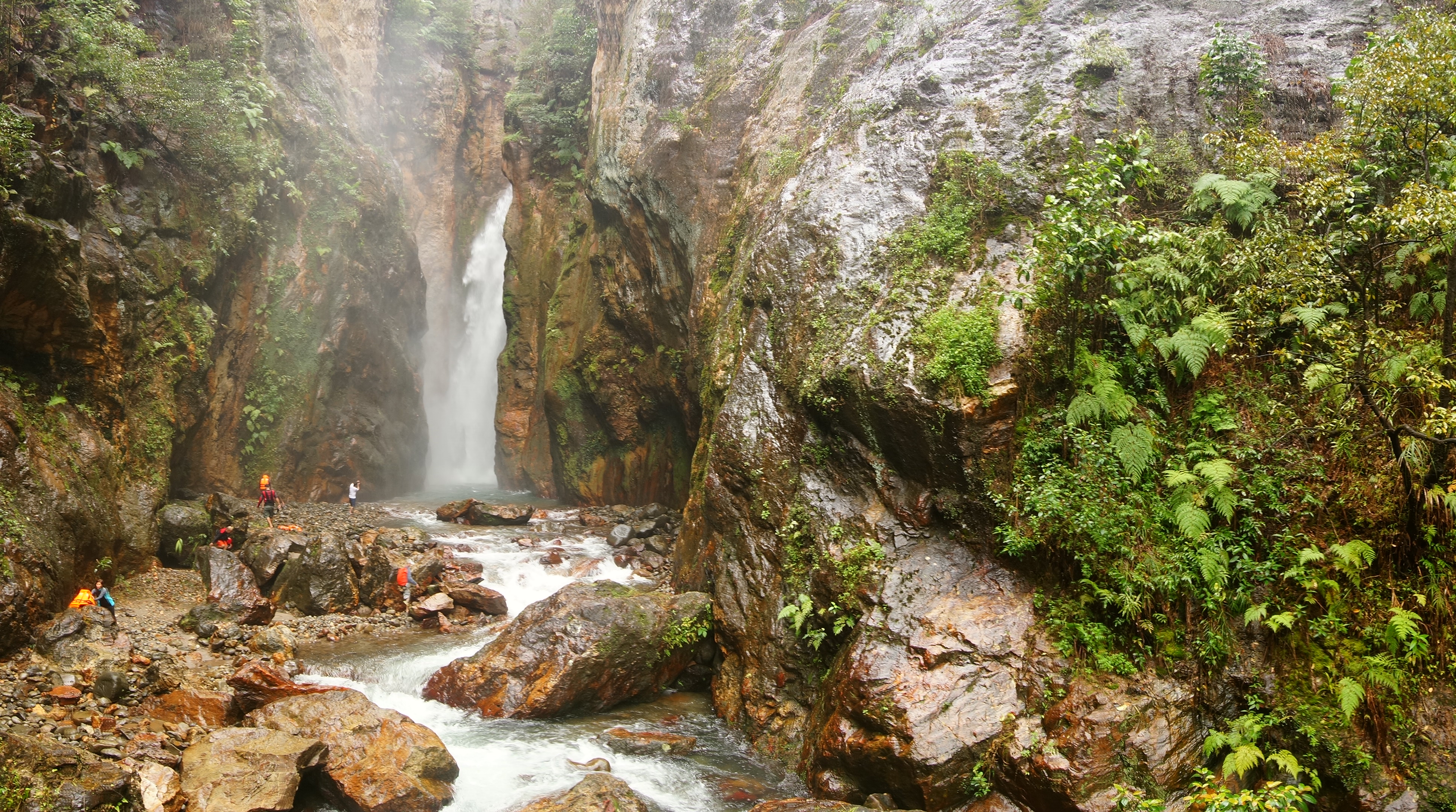
Pasalan Fals, considered the most majestic of the many waterfalls the town has.

Amlan Pasalan Falls
The most majestic of the many falls found in Amlan, Pasalan is located in Silab Highlands. It can be accessed via all forms of vehicle but for the moment, anyone wanting to see the falls, must first secure approval from the local government for safety reasons.

Kang-Untol Falls
A prelude to its much bigger sister, Kang-Untol has a mini-lagoon for those wanting to soak in.

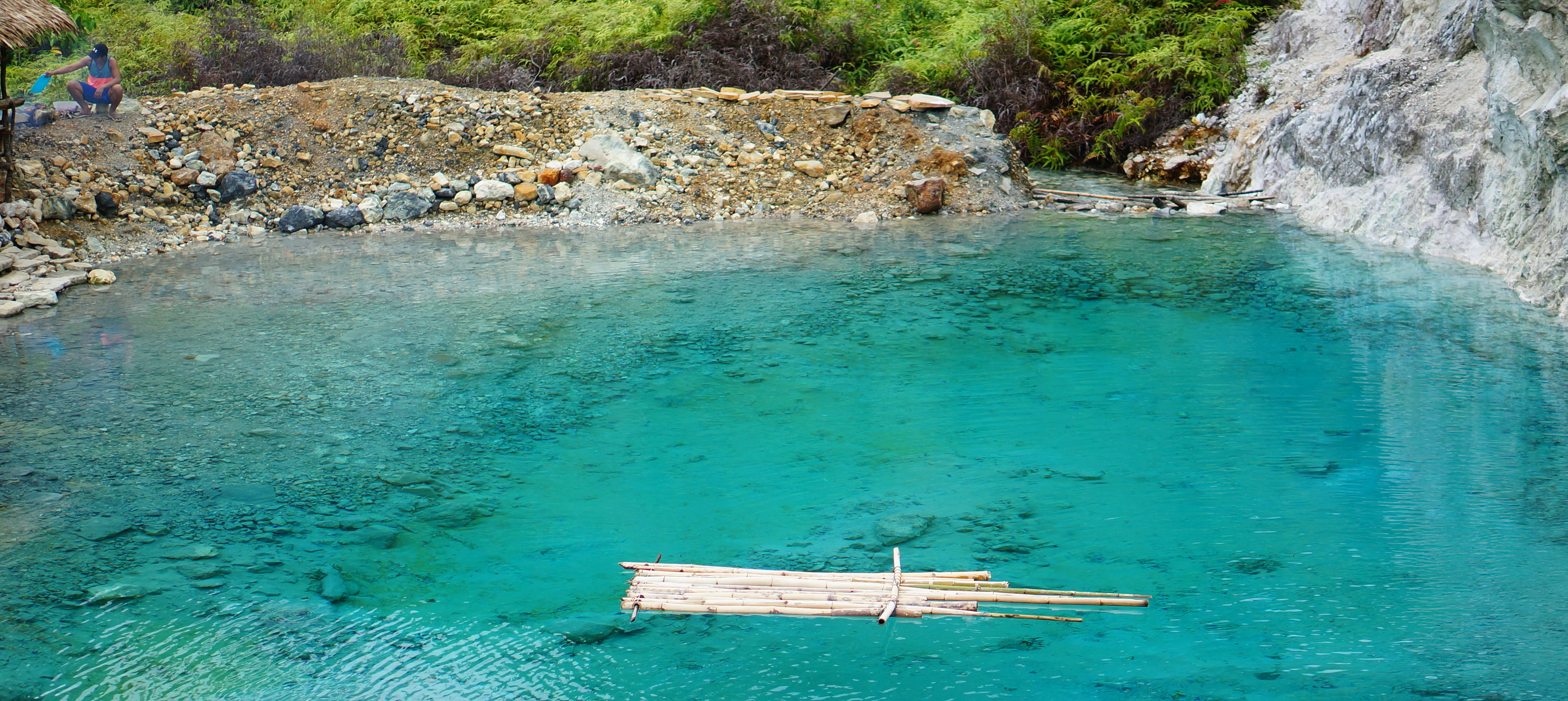
The aquamarine waters of the Asupri sa Maiti

Asupri sa Maiti
A sulfur lagoon up in Jantianon Highlands, Asupri has seen an increase of tourists after photos and videos the attraction were posted in social media.

Naparil and Cantalina Falls
The most accessible falls in Amlan, Naparil is a short 20-minute walk from the main road in Silab.

Lantawan Amlan
The town's highest peak at 1,101 meters above sea level.

Kang Atid
A good place to start river trekking and explore the environs along the banks of the Amlan River.

Jantianon Tri-Falls
The location may be difficult to access, but the three falls, namely, Paphaan, Divine and Paphaun, are sure to delight those weary souls wanting to get away from life's hustle and bustle.

== Education ==
The public schools in the town of Amlan are administered by one school district under the Schools Division of Negros Oriental.

Elementary schools:

- Amlan Central Elementary School — Nat'l Highway, Mag-abo
- Aurelio Ibero Memorial Elementary School — Jugno
- Bio-os Elementary School — Bio-os
- Cañete Elementary School — Sitio Cañete, Jantianon
- Cantalina Elementary School — Sitio Cantalina, Silab
- Jantianon Elementary School — Jantianon
- Martin Benjamin Memorial Elementary School — Tambojangin
- Panusuan Elementary School — Sitio Panusuan, Silab
- Silab Elementary School — Silab
- Tandayag Elementary School — Tandayag

High schools:

- Amlan National High School — Rizal Street, Poblacion
- Amlan NHS - Jugno — Jugno
- Jantianon National High School — Jantianon
- Silab Community High School — Silab

Private schools:

- Seaview Learning Center — Prieto Street, Mag-abo
- St. Andrews School — Nat'l Highway, Poblacion
