= List of radio stations in the Negros Island Region =

Here is the list of radio stations in Negros Island Region.

== Negros Occidental ==
=== AM Stations ===
Frequency	Name	Company	Format	Call Sign	Power	Location Covered
1125 AM	Hapi Radio	Cadiz Radio and TV Network	News, Public affairs, Talk	DYAG	5 KW	Sagay

=== FM Stations ===
Frequency	Name	Company	Format	Call Sign	Power	Location Covered	RDS ID
88.1 FM	Murcia Cares FM	—N/a	Community radio	—N/a	1 KW	Murcia	—N/a
88.1 FM	Radyo ToBayan	—N/a	Community radio	—N/a	900 W	Calatrava	Your News and Local Station
91.1 FM	Redkite FM	5K Broadcasting Network	Community radio	—N/a	1 KW	Toboso	Your News, Music and Local Station
92.3 FM	Fabulous Radio Toboso	—N/a	Community radio	—N/a	500 W	Toboso	—N/a
95.3 FM	Radyo Natin Sipalay	Cebu Broadcasting Company (MBC Media Group)	Community radio	DYDA	2 KW	Sipalay	—N/a
98.5 FM	Radio John	—N/a	Contemporary MOR, News, Talk	—N/a	1 KW	Binalbagan	—N/a
100.7 FM	K5 News FM Don Salvador	5K Broadcasting Network	Contemporary MOR, News, Talk	—N/a	5 kW	Don Salvador Benedicto	—N/a
101.1 FM	Klick FM Don Salvador	5K Broadcasting Network	Classic hits, OPM	—N/a	1 kW	Don Salvador Benedicto	—N/a
101.7 FM	Radyo Bago	City Government of Bago	Community radio	—N/a	1 KW	Bago	—N/a
104.3 FM	K5 News FM Isabela	5K Broadcasting Network	Contemporary MOR, News, Talk	—N/a	1 KW	Isabela	—N/a
104.9 FM	K5 News FM Hinigaran	5K Broadcasting Network	Contemporary MOR, News, Talk	—N/a	5 KW	Hinigaran	K5NEWSFM
105.7 FM	Radyo Natin Hinigaran	MBC Media Group	Community radio	DYSO	500 W	Hinigaran	—N/a

== Hinoba-an ==
=== FM Stations ===
Frequency	Name	Company	Format	Call Sign	Power	Location Covered	RDS ID
94.5 FM	Kings Radio Hinobaan	KAMM Media Network	Contemporary MOR, OPM, News	—N/a	5 KW	Hinoba-an	—N/a
95.5 FM	Klick FM Hinobaan	5K Broadcasting Network	Contemporary MOR, OPM, Top 40	—N/a	3 KW	Hinoba-an	—N/a
105.3 FM	Radyo Natin Hinobaan	MBC Media Group operated by (Radyo Natin Network)	Community radio	DYSL-FM	0.5 KW	Hinoba-an	—N/a

== La Carlota City ==
=== FM Stations ===
Frequency	Name	Company	Format	Call Sign	Power	Location Covered	RDS ID
98.7 FM	K5 News FM La Carlota	5K Broadcasting Network	Contemporary MOR, OPM, News	—N/a	5 KW	La Carlota City	K5NEWSFM
100.7 FM	Praise FM La Carlota	Philippine Church Media Grouo	Community radio, Religious radio	—N/a	1 KW	La Carlota City	PRAISE FM
103.5 FM	Joy Radio La Carlota	—N/a	Community radio, MOR	—N/a	3 KW	La Carlota City	Joy Mo Yan!
104.3 FM	Happy Radio La Carlota	—N/a	Soft AC, CHR, Top 40	—N/a	3 KW	La Carlota City	—N/a
104.9 FM	Summit Radio La Carlota	—N/a	MOR, Community Radio, News	—N/a	1 KW	La Carlota City	—N/a

== Kabankalan City ==
=== FM Stations ===
Frequency	Name	Company	Format	Call Sign	Power	Location Covered	RDS ID
91.3 FM	Radyo Milenyo News FM Kabankalan	Kalayaan Broadcasting System (operated by OPB Mass Media)	Contemporary MOR, News, Talk	—N/a	5 KW	Kabankalan	—N/a
98.1 FM	Heart FM Kabankalan	Allied Broadcasting Center (operated by Rene Ledesma)	Contemporary MOR, OPM	DYRL	5 KW	Kabankalan	—N/a
99.7 FM	Brigada News FM Kabankalan	Baycomms Broadcasting Corporation (Brigada Mass Media Corporation)	Contemporary MOR, News, Talk	DYYE	5 KW	Kabankalan	BRIGADA
100.5 FM	Radyo Muscovado Sweet FM	Gold Label Broadcasting System (Central Philippines State University)	Campus radio, Contemporary MOR, News, Talk	—N/a	5 KW	Kabankalan	—N/a
102.9 FM	K5 News FM Kabankalan	Subic Broadcasting Corporation (5K Broadcasting Network)	Contemporary MOR, News, Talk	DYXU	1 KW	Kabankalan	—N/a
103.7 FM	Radyo Natin Kabankalan	Cebu Broadcasting Company (MBC Media Group)	Community radio	DYCB	0.5 KW	Kabankalan	—N/a
105.3 FM	Life Radio Kabankalan	Soundstream Broadcasting Corporation (operated by Life Extension Philippines)	News, Talk, Public affairs	—N/a	5 KW	Kabankalan	—N/a
106.1 FM	XFM Kabankalan	GVM Radio/TV Corporation (operated by Y2H Broadcasting Network)	Contemporary MOR, News, Talk	—N/a	5 KW	Kabankalan	—N/a

== Sagay City ==
=== FM Stations ===
Frequency	Name	Company	Format	Call Sign	Power	Location Covered	RDS ID
87.5 FM	XFM Sagay	Y2H Broadcasting Network	Contemporary MOR, News, Talk	—N/a	5 KW	Sagay City	—N/a
88.3 FM	Radyo Natin Sagay	MBC Media Group	Community radio	DYRG	0.5 KW	Sagay City	—N/a
89.7 FM	K5 News FM Sagay	Subic Broadcasting Corporation (5K Broadcasting Network)	Contemporary MOR, News, Talk	DYJU	1 KW	Sagay City	K5NEWSFM
92.5 FM	Klick FM Sagay	Gold Label Broadcasting System (5K Broadcasting Network)	Top 40, CHR, Soft AC	—N/a	1 KW	Sagay City	Favourite Hits at Klick FM 92.5 Sagay!

== Escalante City ==
=== FM Stations ===
Frequency	Name	Company	Format	Call Sign	Power	Location Covered	RDS ID
88.1 FM	MRGV FM Escalante	Prime Broadcasting Network	Contemporary MOR, OPM, News, Talk	—N/a	1 KW	Escalante	—N/a
90.5 FM	Hometown Radio Escalante	Hometown Radio Broadcasting Services (Presidential Broadcast Service)	Contemporary MOR, News, Talk	—N/a	500 W	Escalante	—N/a
94.5 FM	Easy Radio Escalante	Capitol Broadcasting Center	Contemporary MOR, OPM, News, Talk	—N/a	1 KW	Escalante	—N/a
96.5 FM	BYFM (Radyo Ng Bayan) Escalante	—N/a	Contemporary MOR, OPM, News, Talk	—N/a	1 KW	Escalante	—N/a
99.1 FM	K5 News FM Escalante	5K Broadcasting Network	Contemporary MOR, OPM, News, Talk	—N/a	5 KW	Escalante	—N/a
107.7 FM	XFM Touch Radio Escalante	Y2H Broadcasting Network	Contemporary MOR, OPM, News, Talk	—N/a	5 KW	Escalante	—N/a

== Bacolod City ==
=== AM Stations ===
Frequency	Name	Company	Format	Call Sign	Power	Location Covered
630 AM	Bombo Radyo Bacolod	People's Broadcasting Service (Bombo Radyo Philippines)	Drama, News, Public affairs, Talk	DYWB	10 KW	Bacolod
684 AM	Aksyon Radyo Bacolod	MBC Media Group (NDM Broadcasting Services)	Drama, News, Public affairs, Talk	DYEZ	10 KW	Bacolod
747 AM	RMN Bacolod	Radio Mindanao Network	Drama, News, Public affairs, Talk	DYHB	10 KW	Bacolod
1035 AM	Radyo Pilipino Bacolod	Radyo Pilipino Media Group	News, Public affairs, Talk	DYRL	10 KW	Bacolod
1080 AM	DZRH Bacolod (relay from Manila)	Pacific Broadcasting System (MBC Media Group)	Drama, news, Public affairs, Talk	DYBH	5 KW	Bacolod
1143 AM	Radyo Totoo Bacolod	Catholic Bishops Conference of the Philippines (Catholic Media Network)	News, Public affairs, Catholic radio, Talk	DYAF	10 KW	Bacolod
1233 AM	1233 DYVS	Far East Broadcasting Company	News, Public affairs, Religion, Talk	DYVS	10 KW	Bacolod
1404 AM	Radyo Ronda Bacolod	Radio Philippines Network	News, Public affairs, Talk	DYKB	10 KW	Bacolod

=== FM Stations ===
Frequency	Name	Company	Format	Call Sign	Power	Location Covered	RDS ID
87.9 FM	Win Radio Bacolod	Mabuhay Broadcasting System (Operated by ZimZam Management inc,)	Contemporary MOR, OPM	DYNG	10 kW	Bacolod	
90.3 FM	XFM Bacolod Repeater	Southern Broadcasting Network (operated by Y2H Broadcasting Network)	Contemporary MOR, OPM, News	DYCP	1 KW	Bacolod	—N/a
91.1 FM	FMR Bacolod	Philippine Collective Media Corporation	Contemporary MOR, News, Talk	—N/a	5 KW	Bacolod	—N/a
91.9 FM	Love Radio Bacolod	MBC Media Group	Contemporary MOR, OPM	DYKS	10 KW	Bacolod	LoveRadio
92.7 FM	AWR Bacolod	Hope Channel Philippines	Religion	—N/a	5 kW	Bacolod	AWR PHILIPPINES
94.3 FM	iFM Bacolod	Radio Mindanao Network	Contemporary MOR, OPM, News	DYHT	10 KW	Bacolod	iFM iDOL 94.3 Bacolod
95.9 FM	Star FM Bacolod	People's Broadcasting Service (Bombo Radyo Philippines)	Contemporary MOR, OPM, News	DYIF	10 KW	Bacolod	1. It's All 2. For You
96.7 FM	XFM Bacolod Repeater	Katigbak Enterprises (DCG Radio-TV Network) (operated by Y2H Broadcasting Network)	Contemporary MOR, News, Talk	DYKR	10 KW	Bacolod	—N/a
99.1 FM	Prime 99.1	Marceo Broadcasting Network (operated by RYU Group of Companies)	Adult hits, News, Talk	DYBM	10 KW	Bacolod	99.1 YUHUM RADIO
99.9 FM	RJFM Bacolod (relay from Manila)	Free Air Broadcasting Network (Rajah Broadcasting Network)	Adult hits	DYFJ	10 KW	Bacolod	99.9RJFM
100.3 FM	Radyo Negrense Bacolod	Provincial Negros Broadcasting Services	Contemporary MOR, OPM, News, Public affairs	PA	10 kW	Bacolod	Live News Update At Radyo Negrense!
101.5 FM	K5 News FM Bacolod	Fairwaves Broadcasting Network (operated by 5K Broadcasting Network)	Contemporary MOR, News, Talk	DYPK	10 KW	Bacolod	K5NEWSFM
102.3 FM	FMR Manila (relay from DWFM Manila)	Nation Broadcasting Corporation (operated by Philippine Collective Media Corporation)	Contemporary MOR, News, Talk	DYBC	10 KW	Bacolod	—N/a
103.1 FM	Brigada News FM Bacolod	Baycomms Broadcasting Corporation (Brigada Mass Media Corporation)	Contemporary MOR, News, Talk	DYMG	10 KW	Bacolod	BRIGADA
103.9 FM	XFM Bacolod	Philippine Collective Media Corporation (operated by Y2H Broadcasting Network)	Contemporary MOR, News, Talk	DYQU	10 KW	Bacolod	—N/a
104.7 FM	Hapi 104.7	Cadiz Radio and TV Network	Classic hits, Talk	DYAG	5 KW	Bacolod	—N/a
105.5 FM	Easy Rock Bacolod	Cebu Broadcasting Company (MBC Media Group)	Soft AC, Easy listening	DYMY	10 KW	Bacolod	—N/a
106.3 FM	Klick FM Bacolod	Quest Broadcasting (operated by 5K Broadcasting Network)	Classic hits, OPM	DYBE	10 KW	Bacolod	—N/a
107.1 FM	Barangay LS Bacolod	GMA Network, Inc.	Contemporary MOR, OPM	DYEN	10 KW	Bacolod	1. Barangay 2. 107.1
107.9 FM	MRGV FM Bacolod	Prime Broadcasting Network (Operated By MRGV FM Radio Network)	Contemporary MOR, OPM	DYQY	10 KW	Bacolod	MRGV FM, Liwanag Ng Bawat Pilipino

== San Carlos City ==
=== FM Stations ===
Frequency	Name	Company	Format	Call Sign	Power	Location Covered	RDS ID
89.3 FM	Brigada News FM San Carlos	Brigada Mass Media Corporation	Drama, News, Public affairs, Talk	DYBA	3 KW	San Carlos	BRIGADA
91.3 FM	Easy Radio San Carlos	Capitol Broadcasting Center	News, Public affairs, Talk	—N/a	2 KW	San Carlos	EASY RADIO
92.1 FM	MRGV Prime FM San Carlos	Prime Broadcasting Network (operated by MRGV FM Network)	News, Public affairs, Talk	DYGV	5 KW	San Carlos	1.MRGV FM 92.1 2. Ito Ang MRGV FM 921, Liwanag Ng Bawat Filipino, 3. flagship Station of MRGV FM Network Visayas
95.1 FM	Klick FM San Carlos	Gold Label Broadcasting System (an affiliate by 5K Broadcasting Network)	Drama, Music, MOR	DYVG-FM	5 KW	San Carlos	1. The 80s, Here Today, 2. Klick FM, The Home Of The Classic Hits 3. 95.1 San Carlos City
95.7 FM	K5 News FM San Carlos	5K Broadcasting Network	Drama, News, Public affairs, Talk	DYGM	10 KW	San Carlos	K5NEWSFM 95.7
98.9 FM	XFM San Carlos	Y2H Broadcasting Network	Drama, News, Public affairs, Talk	DYLJ	10 KW	San Carlos	1. XFM 2. Mga Katropa, Xciting Dito!
99.7 FM	KFM San Carlos	Kanto Broadcasting Services (affiliated with Life Extension Philippines and Herbz Med Pharma Corporation)	Drama, News, Public affairs, Talk	PA	5 KW	San Carlos	—N/a
100.1 FM	Hometown Radio	—N/a	News, Public affairs, Talk, Community Radio	DYCK	100 W	San Carlos	Hometown Radio!
100.5 FM	Juander Radyo San Carlos	Rizal Memorial Colleges Broadcasting Corporation (operated by RSV Broadcasting Network)	Drama, News, Public affairs, Talk	DYFG	1 KW	San Carlos	100.5 JUANDER RADYO
103.7 FM	Radyo Natin San Carlos	MBC Media Group (affiliate by MRGV Network)	News, Public affairs, Talk	DYRE	1 KW	San Carlos	—N/a

== Negros Oriental ==
=== AM Stations ===
Frequency	Name	Company	Format	Call Sign	Power	Location Covered
801 AM	Radyo Bandilyo	Franciscan Broadcasting Corporation (Radio Mindanao Network and Catholic Media Network)	News, Public affairs, Catholic radio, Talk	DYWC	5 KW	Sibulan/Dumaguete

=== FM Stations ===
Frequency	Name	Company	Format	Call Sign	Power	Location Covered	RDS ID
88.1 FM	K5 News FM Tanjay	Fairwaves Broadcasting Network (operated by 5K Broadcasting Network)	Contemporary MOR, News, Talk	—N/a	1 KW	Tanjay	—N/a
89.7 FM	JU FM	Municipal Government of Mabinay (Fairwaves Broadcasting Network)	Contemporary MOR, News, Talk	DYUM	1 KW	Mabinay	—N/a
92.5 FM	JE FM (Idol Radio)	—N/a	Contemporary MOR, News, Talk	—N/a	1 KW	Bindoy	—N/a
92.3 FM	Like Radio Tanjay	Capitol Broadcasting Center	Contemporary MOR, News, Talk	—N/a	1 KW	Tanjay	—N/a
94.3 FM	CityLite FM Tanjay	Subic Broadcasting Corporation	Soft adult contemporary, Talk	DYIK	1 KW	Tanjay	—N/a
94.5 FM	K5 News FM Siaton	Rizal Memorial Colleges Broadcasting Corporation, (operated by 5K Broadcasting Network)	Contemporary MOR, News, Talk	DYSW	5 KW	Siaton	—N/a
95.3 FM	Cool FM Bayawan	Capitol Broadcasting Center	Contemporary MOR, News, Talk	—N/a	1 KW	Bayawan	—N/a
96.1 FM	The Voice FM Tanjay	Iddes Broadcast Group	Contemporary MOR, News, Talk	DYIB	1 KW	Tanjay	—N/a
97.3 FM	Kiss FM Manjuyod	—N/a	Contemporary MOR, News, Talk	—N/a	0.2 KW	Manjuyod	—N/a
98.5 FM	Radyo Kaigsoonan	National Nutrition Council (Nutriskwela Community Radio), operated by the Municipal Government of Zamboanguita	Community radio	DYNO	0.3 KW	Zamboanguita	—N/a
101.1 FM	Riverside FM	—N/a	Contemporary MOR, OPM	—N/a	1 kW	Manjuyod	—N/a
102.1 FM	Power 102.1 RFM	Gold Label Broadcasting System (operated by Ruiz Development Corporation)	Contemporary MOR, News, Talk	DYRY	1 KW	Mabinay	
102.3 FM	Strong Radio Bacong	Line-Of-Sight Broadcast Ventures (Viola Family)	Christian contemporary hit radio, News, Talk	DYWR	0.5 W	Bacong	—N/a
102.5 FM	Kings Radio Siaton	KAMM Media Network	Contemporary MOR, News, Talk	—N/a	1 KW	Siaton	—N/a
102.9 FM	Air FM Tanjay	—N/a	Contemporary MOR, News, Talk	—N/a	1 KW	Tanjay	—N/a
103.5 FM	K5 News FM Ayungon	5K Broadcasting Network	Contemporary MOR, News, Talk	—N/a	1 KW	Ayungon	—N/a
103.9 FM	One Heart Radio Tanjay	Soundstream Broadcasting Corporation	Contemporary MOR, News, Talk	DYST	1 KW	Tanjay	—N/a
104.1 FM	K5 News FM Bacong	5K Broadcasting Network	Contemporary MOR, News, Talk	—N/a	1 KW	Bacong	—N/a
104.7 FM	Happy Radio Basay	Franciscan Broadcasting Corporation	Contemporary MOR, News, Talk	DYWC	1 KW	Basay	—N/a
107.1 FM	K5 News FM Zamboanguita	5K Broadcasting Network	Contemporary MOR, News, Talk	—N/a	5 KW	Zamboanguita	—N/a
107.1 FM	MRGV Prime FM Tanjay	Prime Broadcasting Network	—N/a	—N/a	5 KW	Tanjay	—N/a
107.1 FM	Hawud Radio Manjuyod	—N/a	Contemporary MOR, News, Talk	—N/a	1 KW	Manjuyod	—N/a
107.9 FM	Big FM Pamplona	—N/a	Contemporary MOR, News, Talk	—N/a	1 KW	Pamplona	—N/a

== Dumaguete City ==
=== AM Stations ===
Frequency	Name	Company	Format	Call Sign	Power	Location Covered
1134 AM	Radyo Pilipino Dumaguete	Philippine Radio Corporation (Radyo Pilipino Media Group)	News, Public affairs, Talk	DYRM	5 KW	Dumaguete

=== FM Stations ===
Frequency	Name	Company	Format	Call Sign	Power	Location Covered
88.5 FM	Lifenzymes FM	Nature's Alternative Naturopathy Center	Contemporary MOR, News, Talk	DYEV	5 KW	Dumaguete
89.5 FM	Brigada News FM Dumaguete	Baycomms Broadcasting Corporation (Brigada Mass Media Corporation)	Contemporary MOR, News, Talk	DYBW	5 KW	Dumaguete
90.5 FM	Like Radio Dumaguete	Capitol Broadcasting Center	Contemporary MOR, News, Talk	DYFL	5 KW	Dumaguete
91.7 FM	Power 91	Gold Label Broadcasting System (Radio Mindanao Network)	Contemporary MOR, News, Talk	DYGB	5 KW	Dumaguete
93.7 FM	Energy FM Dumaguete	Ultrasonic Broadcasting System	Contemporary MOR, OPM	DYMD	5 kW	Dumaguete
95.1 FM	SR95	National Council of Churches in the Philippines	Contemporary Hits, Talk	DYSR	5 KW	Dumaguete
95.5 FM	Radyo Sincero Dumaguete	ABJ Broadcasting Services an affiliate by Herbz Med Pharma Corporation	Contemporary MOR, News, Talk	DYDN	5 KW	Dumaguete
96.7 FM	Bai Radio	Negros Broadcasting and Publishing	Contemporary MOR, News, Talk	DYEM	1 KW	Dumaguete
97.7 FM	K5 News FM Dumaguete	Fairwaves Broadcasting Network (operated by 5K Broadcasting Network)	Contemporary MOR, News, Talk	DWFH	1 KW	Dumaguete
99.7 FM	Radyo Kidlat NORECO II	Negros Oriental II Electric Cooperative (Presidential Broadcast Service)	Contemporary MOR, News, Talk	DYPN	1 KW	Dumaguete
100.5 FM	XFM Dumaguete	Y2H Broadcasting Network	Contemporary MOR, News, Talk	—N/a	5 KW	Dumaguete
101.7 FM	Anchor Radio Dumaguete	International Baptist Church of Dumaguete	Christian music	DYAH	1 KW	Dumaguete
103.1 FM	Klick FM Dumaguete	5K Broadcasting Network	Classic Hits, Top 40, CHR, MOR	—N/a	5 KW	Dumaguete
106.3 FM	Yes FM Dumaguete	Cebu Broadcasting Company (MBC Media Group)	Contemporary MOR, OPM	DYYD	5 KW	Dumaguete

== Guihulngan City ==
=== AM Stations ===
Frequency	Name	Company	Format	Call Sign	Power	Location Covered
1458 AM	Radyo SIAM Guihulngan	Sarraga Integrated and Management Corporation	News, Public affairs, Talk	DYZZ	10 KW	Guihulngan City

=== FM Stations ===
Frequency	Name	Company	Format	Call Sign	Power	Location Covered	RDS ID
87.9 FM	K5 News FM Guihulngan	5K Broadcasting Network	Contemporary MOR, News, Talk	—N/a	1 KW	Guihulngan City	K5NEWSFM
88.9 FM	MRGV FM Guihulngan	Prime Broadcasting Network (operated by MRGV FM Network)	Contemporary MOR, News, Talk	—N/a	1 KW	Guihulngan City	1. MRGV FM; 2. Liwanag Ng Bawat Pilipino
92.1 FM	Radyo Natin Guihulngan	MBC Media Group	Contemporary MOR, News, Talk	DYSK	500 W	Guihulngan City	—N/a
92.9 FM	XFM Guihulngan (Note: repeater of 88.3 XFM Cebu City.)	Y2H Broadcasting Network	Contemporary MOR, News, Talk	DYCI	1 KW	Guihulngan City	—N/a
94.5 FM	Like Radio Guihulngan	Capitol Broadcasting Center	Contemporary MOR, OPM	DYJL	1 kW	Guihulngan City	—N/a
98.9 FM	Light FM Guihulngan	Westwind Broadcasting Corporation	Contemporary Hits, Talk	DYRN	3 KW	Guihulngan City	1. 98.9 Light FM; 2. Basta May Light, Hayag Ang Life!!!
103.3 FM	Praise FM Guihulngan	—N/a	Christian radio	—N/a	1 KW	Guihulngan City	—N/a

== Canlaon City ==
=== FM Stations ===
Frequency	Name	Company	Format	Call Sign	Power	Location Covered
92.7 FM	Like Radio News FM Canlaon	Capitol Broadcasting Center	Contemporary MOR, News, Talk	—N/a	1 KW	Canlaon
94.1 FM	XFM Canlaon repeater	Y2H Broadcasting Network	Contemporary MOR, News, Talk	—N/a	1 kW	Canlaon
99.3 FM	Bethel Radio Canlaon (Note: Relay station of 98.3 Starr Radio FM Tayasan.)	Amapola Broadcasting System	Contemporary MOR, News, Talk	—N/a	1 KW	Canlaon
100.1 FM	K5 News FM Canlaon	5K Broadcasting Network	Contemporary MOR, News, Talk	—N/a	1 KW	Canlaon
101.3 FM	MRGV FM Canlaon (Note: relay station of 92.1 MRGV Prime FM San Carlos.)	Prime Broadcasting Network	Contemporary MOR, News, Talk	—N/a	5 KW	Canlaon
101.7 FM	XFM Canlaon	Y2H Broadcasting Network	Contemporary MOR, News, Talk	—N/a	1 KW	Canlaon
105.3 FM	Prime FM Canlaon (off-air)	Prime Broadcasting Network	Contemporary Hits, Talk	DYPB	1 KW	Canlaon
106.1 FM	Radyo Sincero Canlaon	Times Broadcasting Network Corporation (Bisdak Media Group) operated by Herbz Med Pharma Corporation	Contemporary MOR, News, Talk	—N/a	—N/a	Canlaon

== Bais City ==
=== FM Stations ===
Frequency	Name	Company	Format	Call Sign	Power	Location Covered
88.9 FM	MRGV Prime FM Bais	Prime Broadcasting Network	Contemporary MOR, News, Talk	DYDB	1 KW	Bais
99.1 FM	K5 News FM Bais	5K Broadcasting Network	Contemporary MOR, News, Talk	—N/a	1 KW	Bais
104.7 FM	Like Radio News FM Bais	Capitol Broadcasting Center	Contemporary MOR, News, Talk	DYEL	1 KW	Bais
105.5 FM	Radyo Natin Bais	MBC Media Group	Contemporary MOR, News, Talk	DYBI	1 KW	Bais

== Jimalalud ==
=== FM Stations ===
Frequency	Name	Company	Format	Call Sign	Power	Location Covered
97.1 FM	K5 News FM Jimalalud	5K Broadcasting Network	News, Public affairs, Talk	—N/a	1 KW	Jimalalud
99.3 FM	KISS FM Jimalalud	Capitol Broadcasting Center	News, Music	—N/a	1 KW	Jimalalud

== Tayasan ==
=== FM Stations ===
Frequency	Name	Company	Format	Call Sign	Power	Location Covered	RDS ID
98.3 FM	Starr Radio Tayasan	Amapola Broadcasting System	News, Public affairs, Talk	—N/a	1 KW	Tayasan	StarrRDO Your Music & Info Station
99.1 FM	Bago High School Starr Radio	Bago National High School	Campus radio	—N/a	0.5 KW	Bago, Tayasan	—N/a

== Bayawan City ==
=== FM Stations ===
Frequency	Name	Company	Format	Call Sign	Power	Location Covered	RDS ID
100.1 FM	MRGV Prime FM Bayawan	Prime Broadcasting Network	Contemporary MOR, News, Talk	DYDQ	5 KW	Bayawan	MRGV FM, Liwanag Ng Bawat Pilipino
105.7 FM	Radyo Natin Bayawan	MBC Media Group	Community radio	DYSJ	0.5 KW	Bayawan	—N/a
106.5 FM	K5 News FM Bayawan	Gold Label Broadcasting System (operated by 5K Broadcasting Network)	Contemporary MOR, News, Talk	DYGL	1 KW	Bayawan	—N/a

== Siquijor ==
=== FM Stations ===
Frequency	Name	Company	Format	Call Sign	Power	Location Covered	RDS ID
105.7 FM	K5 News FM Siquijor	5K Broadcasting Network	Contemporary MOR, OPM, News/Talk	—N/a	5 KW	Siquijor	—N/a
105.9 FM	Radyo Sincero Siquijor	Herbz Med Parma Corporation	Contemporary MOR, OPM, News/Talk	—N/a	5 KW	Siquijor	—N/a
107.3 FM	Klick FM Siquijor	5K Broadcasting Network	Classic hits, OPM	—N/a	1 KW	Siquijor	The Eighties, Here Today! Klick FM 107.3 Siquijor
