= DYAG =

DYAG is the callsign of Cadiz Radio and TV Network's stations in Negros Occidental:

- DYAG-AM, an AM radio station broadcasting in Sagay, Negros Occidental, branded as Hapi Radio
- DYAG-FM, an FM radio station broadcasting in Bacolod, branded as Hapi 104.7
