= DYMD =

DYMD may refer to the following broadcast stations in the Philippines:

- DYMD-DTV in Roxas City, Capiz. Broadcasting as TV5.
- DYMD-FM in Dumaguete City, Negros Oriental. Broadcasting as Energy FM.
