= DYIB =

Philippine radio station in Tanjay

The Voice FM (DYIB)
- Tanjay; Philippines
- Broadcast area: Central Negros Oriental and surrounding areas
- Frequency: 96.1 MHz
- Branding: 96.1 The Voice FM

Programming
- Languages: Cebuano, Filipino
- Format: Contemporary MOR, News, Talk
- Affiliations: Power 102.1 Mabinay

Ownership
- Owner: Iddes Broadcast Group

History
- First air date: February 3, 2019
- Call sign meaning: Iddes Broadcast Group

Technical information
- Licensing authority: NTC
- Power: 1,000 watts
- ERP: 5,000 watts

Links
- Webcast: https://www.amfmph.com/the-voice-fm-96-1-17786.html
- Website: Facebook page

DYIB (96.1 FM), broadcasting as 96.1 The Voice FM, is a radio station owned and operated by Iddes Broadcast Group. The station's studio and transmitter are located at Brgy. 2, Tanjay.

== Programming ==
DYIB 96.1's weekday schedule features two locally produced news and talk programs: The Voice NegOr Balita in morning primetime and Ronda Balita in the early evening. Music and entertainment programming fill the remainder of the broadcast day, as well as some blocktimers. Top-of-the-hour news reports are broadcast twice an hour in the mid-morning, featuring local, national and world headlines. It airs selected programs from Power 102.1 RFM based in Mabinay.

Weekends primarily feature music and entertainment programs and a few blocktime shows, save for an hour-long block of Christian music followed by a religious talk program, Alarma Tirada, on Sunday nights.
