= 5K Broadcasting Network =

Radio broadcasting company in the Philippines

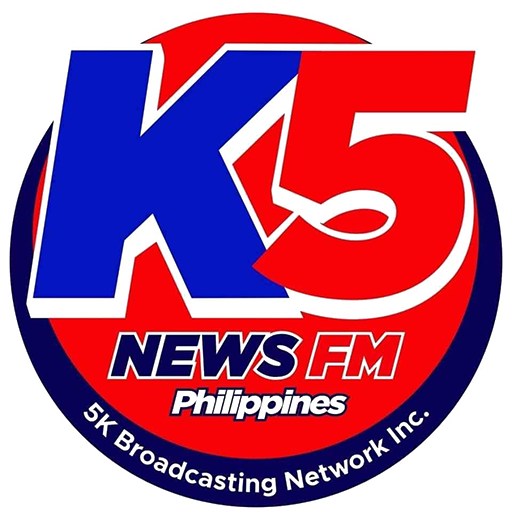
- Formerly: Xanthone Plus Broadcasting Services
- Type: Private
- Industry: Mass media
- Founded: 2015
- Headquarters: Bacolod
- Key people: Ramel Y. Uy (President and CEO); Eljohn S. Castaño (VP for Operations)

5K Broadcasting Network is a Philippine broadcasting company. Its corporate office is located in Bacolod. 5K operates a number of FM stations across the country via airtime lease agreement under the K5 News FM brand.

== History ==
The company was established in 2015 by naturopathy and alternative medicine specialist Dr. Ramel Y. Uy as Xanthone Plus Broadcasting Services. DYBZ (whose frequency is owned by RMC Broadcasting Corporation) based in San Jose de Buenavista, Antique was its first station under the Sweet FM brand.

By 2017, XPBS transferred its corporate headquarters and operations to Bacolod and became a partner company of Bandera News Philippines for stations in Western Visayas and Negros Oriental under the Radyo Bandera Sweet FM brand, with the majority of its stations licensed under Fairwaves Broadcasting Network.

In 2021, XPBS rebranded as 5K Broadcasting Network after transferring its Xanthone Plus herbal products to Yes2Health, a company owned by Ramel Uy's younger brother Remelito which would launch its own radio network XFM the following year.

On November 27, 2023, the National Telecommunications Commission (NTC) issued a cease-and-desist order against radio stations that were licensed under Fairwaves Broadcasting Network due to the expiry of its legislative broadcast franchise in 2020. Bandera News Philippines founder Elgin Damasco contended that the affected stations under Fairwaves had their ownership transferred to Palawan Broadcasting Corporation after the latter's franchise renewal was granted in 2021.

By November 2023, 5K Broadcasting ended its partnership with Bandera News. On December 1, all of its stations rebranded as K5 News FM to reflect the change. The following year, it expanded to various markets across the country.

On August 15, 2025, Abante inked an agreement with 5K, where the former will air a number of programs from its eponymous radio station, along with Bilyonaryo News Channel's newscast Agenda, on selected K5 News FM stations.

== Radio stations ==
=== K5 News FM ===
Name	Callsign	Frequency	Location	Owner
K5 News FM Bacolod	—N/a	101.5 MHz	Bacolod	Palawan Broadcasting Corporation
Klick FM Bacolod	DYBE	106.3 MHz	Bacolod	Quest Broadcasting
K5 News FM Olongapo	DZIV	88.7 MHz	Olongapo	Apollo Broadcast Investors
K5 News FM Santiago	DZRI	100.1 MHz	Santiago, Isabela	Apollo Broadcast Investors
K5 News FM Masbate	DYME	95.9 MHz	Masbate City	Masbate Community Broadcasting Company
K5 News FM Palawan	DWAR	103.9 MHz	Puerto Princesa	Rolin Broadcasting Enterprises
K5 News FM Iloilo	DYKU	88.7 MHz	Iloilo City	FBS Radio Network
K5 News FM Roxas	DYHG	100.9 MHz	Roxas City	Hypersonic Broadcasting Center
K5 News FM Kalibo	DYTJ	94.5 MHz	Kalibo	Tagbilaran Broadcasting System
K5 News FM Kabankalan	DYXU	102.9 MHz	Kabankalan	Subic Broadcasting Corporation
K5 News FM Bayawan	DYGL	106.5 MHz	Bayawan	Gold Label Broadcasting System
K5 News FM Culasi	DYJA	95.9 MHz	Culasi	Subic Broadcasting Corporation
K5 News FM San Jose	DYBZ	95.7 MHz	San Jose de Buenavista	Rizal Memorial Colleges Broadcasting Corporation
K5 News FM Sagay	DYJU	89.7 MHz	Sagay	Subic Broadcasting Corporation
K5 News FM Sipalay	—N/a	96.9 MHz	Sipalay	Masbate Community Broadcasting Company
K5 News FM Canlaon	—N/a	100.1 MHz	Canlaon	Masbate Community Broadcasting Company
K5 News FM Siaton	DYSW	94.5 MHz	Siaton	Rizal Memorial Colleges Broadcasting Corporation
Klick FM San Carlos	—N/a	95.1 MHz	San Carlos	—N/a
K5 News FM San Carlos	DYGM	95.7 MHz	San Carlos	Gold Label Broadcasting System
K5 News FM Dumaguete	DWFH	97.7 MHz	Dumaguete	Palawan Broadcasting Corporation
K5 News FM Tanjay	DYPW	88.1 MHz	Tanjay	Allied Broadcasting Center
K5 News FM Guihulngan	—N/a	87.9 MHz	Guihulngan	Palawan Broadcasting Corporation
K5 News FM Hinigaran	—N/a	104.9 MHz	Hinigaran	Palawan Broadcasting Corporation
K5 News FM Isabela	—N/a	104.3 MHz	Isabela, Negros Occidental	Palawan Broadcasting Corporation
K5 News FM Jimalalud	—N/a	97.1 MHz	Jimalalud	Palawan Broadcasting Corporation
K5 News FM Bais	—N/a	99.1 MHz	Bais	FBS Radio Network
K5 News FM Ayungon	—N/a	103.5 MHz	Ayungon	Palawan Broadcasting Corporation
K5 News FM Siquijor	—N/a	105.7 MHz	Siquijor	Times Broadcasting Corporation
K5 News FM Tacloban	DYTG	103.1 MHz	Tacloban	Tagbilaran Broadcasting System
K5 News FM CDO	DXKB	89.3 MHz	Cagayan de Oro	Quest Broadcasting

=== Affiliate stations ===
The following stations are affiliated with K5 News FM.

Name	Callsign	Frequency	Location	Owner
K3 FM	PA	105.1 MHz	Miagao	Hunter 61 Infantry Battalion - Philippine Army
Radyo Muscovado	DYKQ	100.5 MHz	Kabankalan	Central Philippines State University
Prime 99.1	DYBM	99.1 MHz	Bacolod	Mareco Broadcasting Network
JU FM	DYUM	89.7 MHz	Mabinay	Palawan Broadcasting Corporation
Energy FM Gingoog	DXQU	90.5 MHz	Gingoog	Ultrasonic Broadcasting System
