= DYSL =

DYSL may refer to:

- DYSL-AM, an AM radio station broadcasting in Sogod, Southern Leyte, branded as Radyo Pilipinas
- DYSL-FM, an FM radio station broadcasting in Hinoba-an, branded as Radyo Natin
