= DYBZ =

K5 News FM Antique (DYBZ)
San Jose de Buenavista; Philippines
- Broadcast area: Southern Antique, Western Iloilo
- Frequency: 95.7 MHz
- Branding: 95.7 K5 News FM

Programming
- Languages: Karay-a, Filipino
- Format: Contemporary MOR, News, Talk
- Network: K5 News FM
- Affiliations: Abante; Bilyonaryo News Channel

Ownership
- Owner: Rizal Memorial Colleges Broadcasting Corporation
- Operator: 5K Broadcasting Network

History
- First air date: August 15, 2015
- Former names: Radyo Bandera Sweet FM

Technical information
- Licensing authority: NTC
- Power: 5 kW

95.7 K5 News FM (DYBZ 95.7 MHz) is an FM station owned by Rizal Memorial Colleges Broadcasting Corporation and operated by 5K Broadcasting Network. Its studios and transmitter are located at the 3rd Floor, Cabasan Bldg., Brgy. 7, San Jose de Buenavista.
