= DWAR-FM =

Radio station in Puerto Princesa, Philippines

K5 News FM Palawan (DWAR)
- Puerto Princesa; Philippines
- Broadcast area: Palawan
- Frequency: 103.9 MHz
- Branding: 103.9 K5 News FM

Programming
- Language: Filipino
- Format: News, Public Affairs, Talk
- Network: K5 News FM

Ownership
- Owner: Rolin Broadcasting Enterprises, Inc.
- Operator: 5K Broadcasting Network

History
- Former names: RMN Palawan

Technical information
- Licensing authority: NTC
- Class: CDE
- Power: 10,000 watts
- ERP: 21,000 watts
- Repeaters: Brooke's Point: 98.7 MHz; Quezon: 103.1 MHz; Sofronio Española: 107.1 MHz; Roxas: 98.3 MHz; Narra: 98.5 MHz

DWAR (103.9 FM), on-air as 103.9 K5 News FM, is an FM radio station owned by Romeo Servando's Rolin Broadcasting Enterprises and operated by 5K Broadcasting Network. Its main studio and transmitter are located along BM Rd., Bgy. San Manuel, Puerto Princesa, with repeaters located in various towns in Palawan.

== History ==
The station was formerly under the management of the Radio Mindanao Network until December 2025.

Gerry Ortega, the pro-environment journalist slain last 2011, had a program in this station.
