= DYBW =

Radio station in Dumaguete City, Philippines

Brigada News FM Dumaguete (DYBW)
- Dumaguete; Philippines
- Broadcast area: Negros Oriental
- Frequency: 89.5 MHz
- Branding: 89.5 Brigada News FM

Programming
- Languages: Cebuano, Filipino
- Format: Contemporary MOR, News, Talk
- Network: Brigada News FM

Ownership
- Owner: Brigada Mass Media Corporation; (Baycomms Broadcasting Corporation)

History
- First air date: May 11, 2019
- Former call signs: DYKZ (2019-2021)

Technical information
- Licensing authority: NTC
- Power: 5 kW

Links
- Website: www.brigadanews.ph

89.5 Brigada News FM (DYBW 89.5 MHz) is an FM station owned and operated by the Brigada Mass Media Corporation. The station's studio and transmitter are located at Aldecoa Drive, Barangay Daro, Dumaguete.
