= DYSW =

K5 News FM Siaton (DYSW)
Siaton; Philippines
- Broadcast area: Southern Negros Oriental and surrounding areas
- Frequency: 94.5 MHz
- Branding: 94.5 K5 News FM

Programming
- Languages: Cebuano, Filipino
- Format: Pop MOR, News, Talk
- Network: K5 News FM
- Affiliations: Abante; Bilyonaryo News Channel

Ownership
- Owner: Rizal Memorial Colleges Broadcasting Corporation
- Operator: 5K Broadcasting Network

History
- First air date: 2015
- Former names: Radyo ni Juan (2015–2019); Radyo Bandera Sweet FM (2019-November 2023)
- Call sign meaning: Sweet FM (former name)

Technical information
- Licensing authority: NTC
- Power: 5,000 watts

DYSW (94.5 FM), broadcasting as 94.5 K5 News FM, is a radio station owned by Rizal Memorial Colleges Broadcasting Corporation and operated by 5K Broadcasting Network. Its studios and transmitter are located in Siaton.

The station was formerly under the Radyo Ni Juan network from 2015 to 2019, when 5K Broadcasting Network, Inc. took over its operations and became part of the Radyo Bandera Sweet FM network, which rebranded as K5 News FM on December 1, 2023.
