= DYSL-FM =

Radio station in Hinoba-an, Philippines

Radyo Natin Hinoba-an (DYSL)
- Hinoba-an; Philippines
- Broadcast area: Hinoba-an and surrounding areas
- Frequency: 105.3 MHz
- Branding: Radyo Natin 105.3

Programming
- Languages: Hiligaynon, Filipino
- Format: Community radio
- Network: Radyo Natin Network

Ownership
- Owner: MBC Media Group
- Operator: JMV Broadcast Ventures

History
- First air date: December 16, 1997

Technical information
- Licensing authority: NTC
- Class: BCDE
- Power: 500 watts
- ERP: 1.05 kilowatts

Links
- Website: https://www.radyonatin.com

DYSL (105.3 FM), broadcasting as Radyo Natin 105.3, is a radio station owned by MBC Media Group and operated by JMV Broadcast Ventures. Its studio is located in John Paul Bldg. Brgy. Bacuyangan, Hinoba-an.

== History ==
The station was among the Radyo Natin stations launched on December 16, 1997. It was under the management of Airwaves Advertising.

On March 1, 2013, the station's studio was padlocked due to the former manager's criticism against then-mayor Ma. Teresa Bilbao. Since then, it went off the air.

In 2015, Radyo Natin returned on air, this time under the management of JMV Broadcast Ventures, which also operates Radyo Natin in Hinigaran.
