= DYEM =

Radio station in Dumaguete City, Philippines

Bai Radio (DYEM)
- Dumaguete; Philippines
- Broadcast area: Southern Negros Oriental and surrounding areas
- Frequency: 96.7 MHz
- Branding: 96.7 Bai Radio

Programming
- Languages: Cebuano, Filipino
- Format: Contemporary MOR; News; Talk

Ownership
- Owner: Negros Broadcasting & Publishing Corporation

History
- First air date: March 26, 1980
- Former names: Love Radio; Energy FM
- Call sign meaning: Energy FM (former branding)

Technical information
- Licensing authority: NTC
- Power: 5,000 watts
- ERP: 10,000 watts
- Transmitter coordinates: 9.321604°N 123.304317°E

Links
- Website: http://dumaguetebairadio.com/

DYEM (96.7 FM), broadcasting as 96.7 Bai Radio, is a Philippines radio station owned and operated by Negros Broadcasting & Publishing Corporation, a local media outlet of Ely Dejaresco which also owns The Negros Chronicle, the longest running weekly newspaper in the city and the province of Negros Oriental. Its studios and transmitter facilities are located at 106 EJ Blanco Dr., Brgy. Piapi, Dumaguete.

Established in 1980, DYEM is the pioneer FM radio station in Dumaguete. It was operated by Ultrasonic Broadcasting System under the Energy FM network from 2000 to 2013.

== History ==
DYEM was launched on March 26, 1980. It was Dumaguete's first FM radio station.

In the 1990s, DYEM carried the brand Love Radio (not to be confused with Manila Broadcasting Company's Love Radio Network). It aired a soft adult contemporary and format. The station later became popular with listeners because of its music format, its programming, which includes a weekly countdown program, and was also the "official radio station" for concerts held in Dumaguete.

In 1991, when Power 95 was launched, Negros Broadcasting & Publishing Inc., filed a case against the owners, Gold Label Broadcasting, because its station was broadcasting at 95.7 MHz, nearer to DYEM's frequency. GLBS's owners later responded to NBP's case by moving DYGB to 95.1 MHz.

In 2000, Ultrasonic Broadcasting System took over the station's operations under the Energy FM network. In 2010, it was renamed as Star Energy FM.

On November 24, 2013, the station rebranded as Bai Radio to prevent confusion with 93.7 FM, which was acquired by UBSI the month before and has carried the Energy FM brand since.

== Incidents ==
On November 7, 2019, the broadcaster Dindo Generoso was shot dead as he was on his way to a radio program "Konsencia sa Provincia". He was a longtime block timer of local politicians. He was also spokesman of Dumaguete mayor Felipe Antonio Ipe Remollo.
