= DYRY =

RFM (DYRY)
- Mabinay; Philippines
- Broadcast area: Central Negros Oriental and surrounding areas
- Frequency: 102.1 MHz
- Branding: Power 102.1 RFM

Programming
- Languages: Cebuano, Filipino
- Format: Contemporary MOR, News, Talk

Ownership
- Owner: Gold Label Broadcasting System
- Operator: Ruiz Development Corporation
- Sister stations: Power 91

History
- First air date: 2014
- Former frequencies: 96.5 (2014–2015)
- Call sign meaning: Ruiz Family

Technical information
- Licensing authority: NTC
- Class: C
- Power: 1 kW
- ERP: 2.1 Kw

Power 102.1 RFM (DYRY 102.1 MHz) is an FM station owned by Gold Label Broadcasting System and operated by Ruiz Development Corporation of former Municipal SB Member Beverly "Berly" Ruiz. Its studios and transmitter are located along Naranghita St., Brgy. Poblacion, Mabinay.
