= DWFH =

K5 News FM Dumaguete (DWFH)
- Dumaguete; Philippines
- Broadcast area: Southern Negros Oriental and surrounding areas
- Frequency: 97.7 MHz
- Branding: 97.7 K5 News FM

Programming
- Languages: Cebuano, Filipino
- Format: Contemporary MOR, News, Talk
- Network: K5 News FM
- Affiliations: Abante; Bilyonaryo News Channel

Ownership
- Owner: Palawan Broadcasting Corporation
- Operator: 5K Broadcasting Network

History
- First air date: November 8, 2019
- Former names: Radyo Bandera Sweet FM

Technical information
- Licensing authority: NTC
- Power: 1 kW

97.7 K5 News FM (DWFH 97.7 MHz) is an FM station owned by Palawan Broadcasting Corporation and operated under an airtime lease agreement by 5K Broadcasting Network. Its studios and transmitter are located along Dumaguete Diversion Rd. cor. W. Rovira Rd., Purok Malinawon, Brgy. Camanjac, Dumaguete.
