= DYYD =

Radio station in the Philippines

Yes FM Dumaguete (DYYD)
- Dumaguete; Philippines
- Broadcast area: Southern Negros Oriental and surrounding areas
- Frequency: 106.3 MHz
- Branding: 106.3 Yes FM

Programming
- Languages: Cebuano, Filipino
- Format: Contemporary MOR, OPM
- Network: Yes FM

Ownership
- Owner: MBC Media Group; (Cebu Broadcasting Company)

History
- First air date: 1992
- Former call signs: DYMY (1992-2000s)
- Former names: Love Radio (1992–1998)
- Call sign meaning: Yes FM Dumaguete

Technical information
- Licensing authority: NTC
- Power: 5,000 watts
- ERP: 25,000 Watts

Links
- Webcast: Listen Live
- Website: Yes The Best Dumaguete

DYYD (106.3 FM), broadcasting as 106.3 Yes FM, is a radio station owned and operated by MBC Media Group through its licensee Cebu Broadcasting Company. Its studios and transmitter facilities are located at the 2nd floor, Sesyl Arcade, Hotel Palwa, Locsin St., Dumaguete.

== History ==
DYYD was established in 1992 as Love Radio under the call letters DYMY. At that time, the station aired an easy listening format. In 1998, the station rebranded as Yes FM and switched to a mass-based format. In 2000s, the station changed its call letters to DYYD. On May 1, 2017, the station rebranded as Yes The Best and adopted the new slogan, "The Millennials' Choice." On February 5, 2024, it rebranded back to Yes FM.
