= DYEN =

Radio station in Bacolod, Philippines

Barangay LS Bacolod (DYEN)
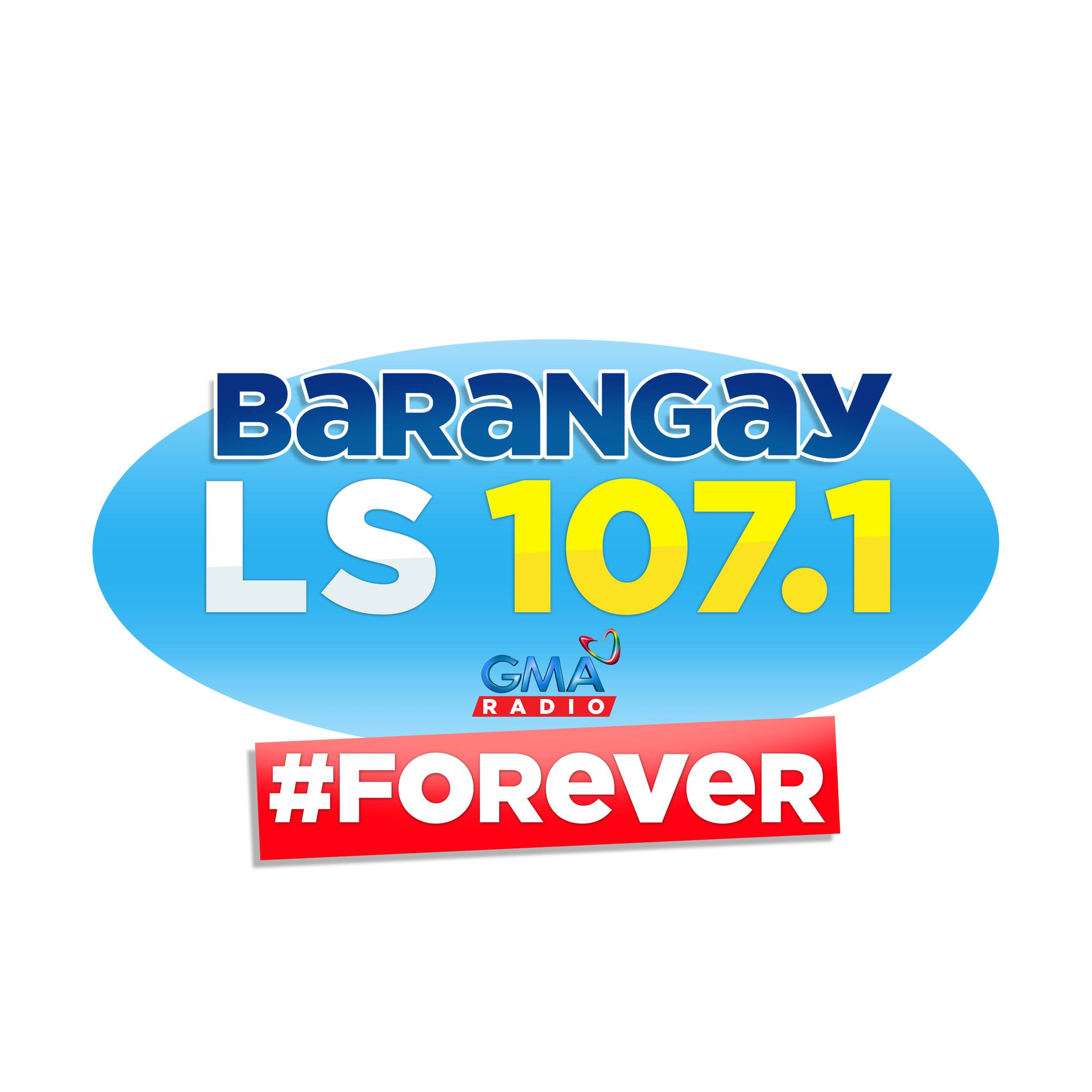
- Bacolod; Philippines
- Broadcast area: Northern Negros Occidental and surrounding areas
- Frequency: 107.1 MHz
- Branding: Barangay LS 107.1

Programming
- Languages: Hiligaynon, Filipino
- Format: Contemporary MOR, OPM
- Network: Barangay LS

Ownership
- Owner: GMA Network Inc.
- Sister stations: GMA TV-13 Bacolod; GMA TV-30 Murcia; DYSB Super Radyo

History
- First air date: 1995
- Former names: Campus Radio (1995–2014)

Technical information
- Licensing authority: NTC
- Power: 10,000 watts
- ERP: 30,000 watts

Links
- Website: www.gmanetwork.com

DYEN (107.1 FM), broadcasting as Barangay LS 107.1, is a radio station owned and operated by GMA Network Inc. The station's studio and transmitter are located at Door 10, 3rd Floor, Centroplex Mall, Gonzaga St., Bacolod.

The station was launched in 1995 as Campus Radio before rebranding to Barangay FM on February 17, 2014. On April 6, 2026, it adopted the Barangay LS branding, after the flagship FM station based in Metro Manila.
