= Bayawan =

Component city in Negros Oriental, Philippines

- Component city
- City of Bayawan
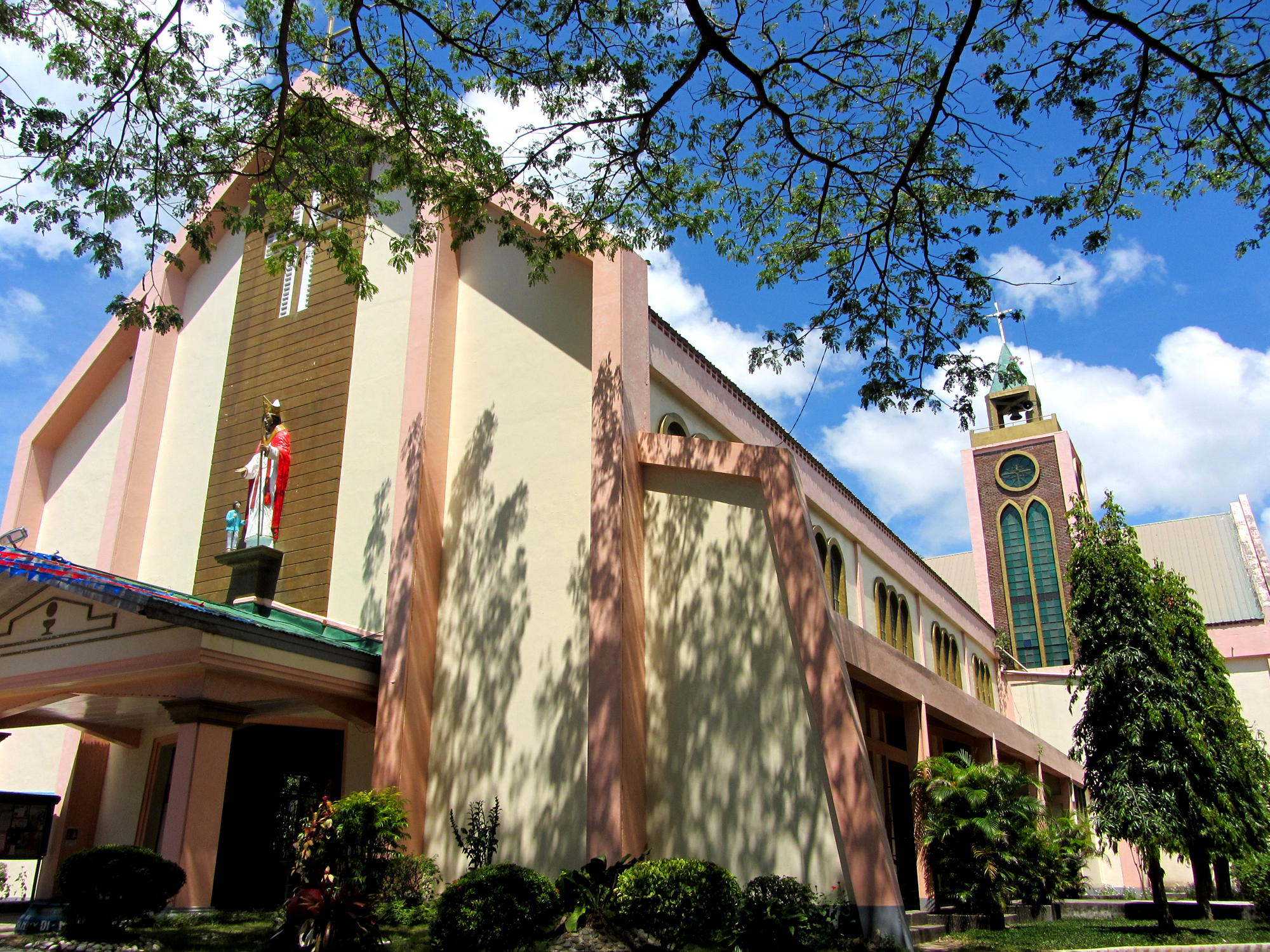
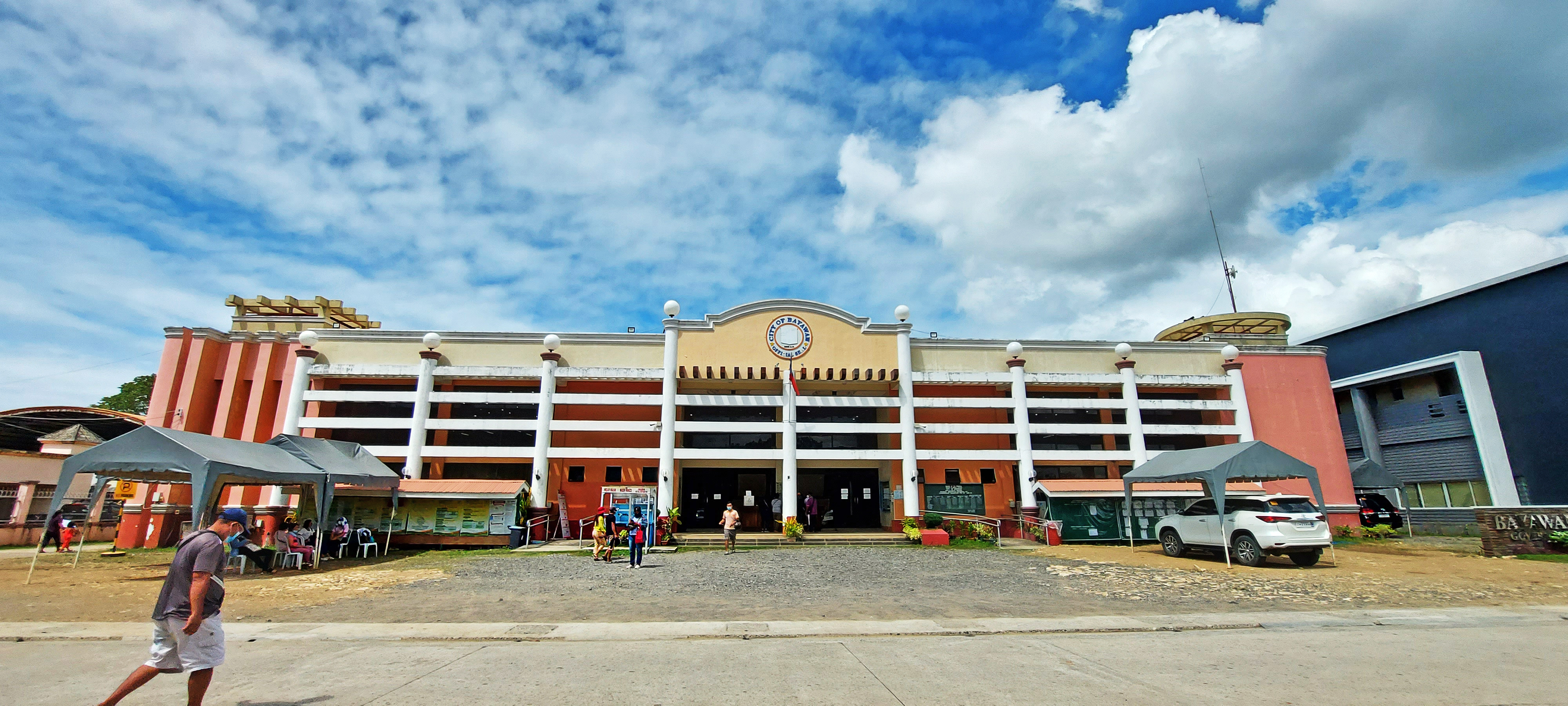
- St. Tomas de Villanueva Parish Church (top), Bayawan City Hall (bottom)

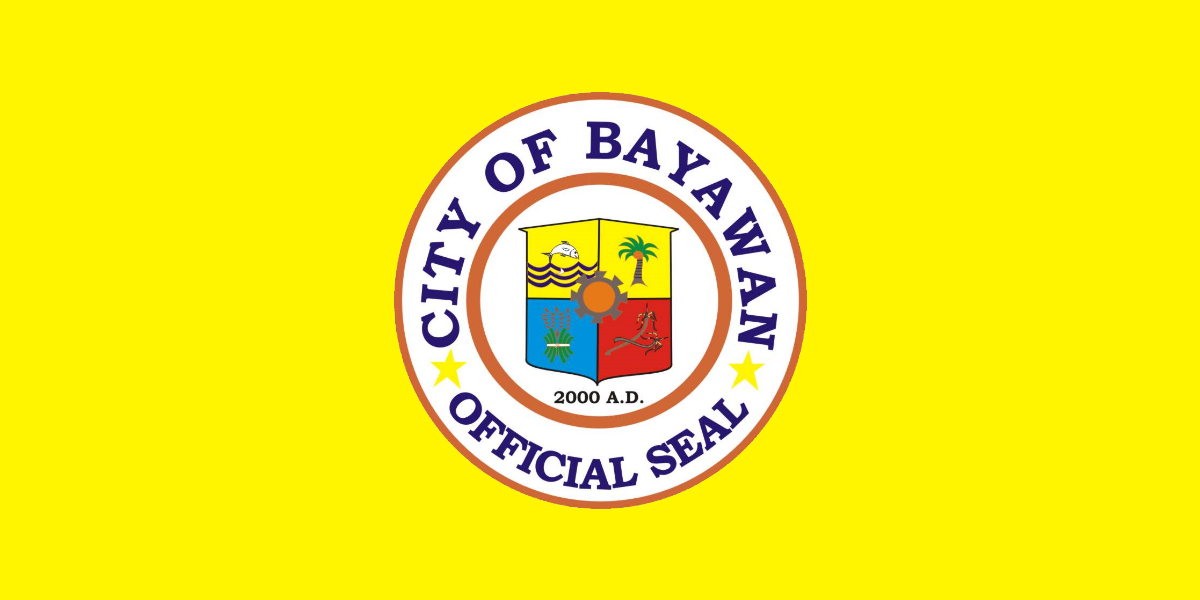
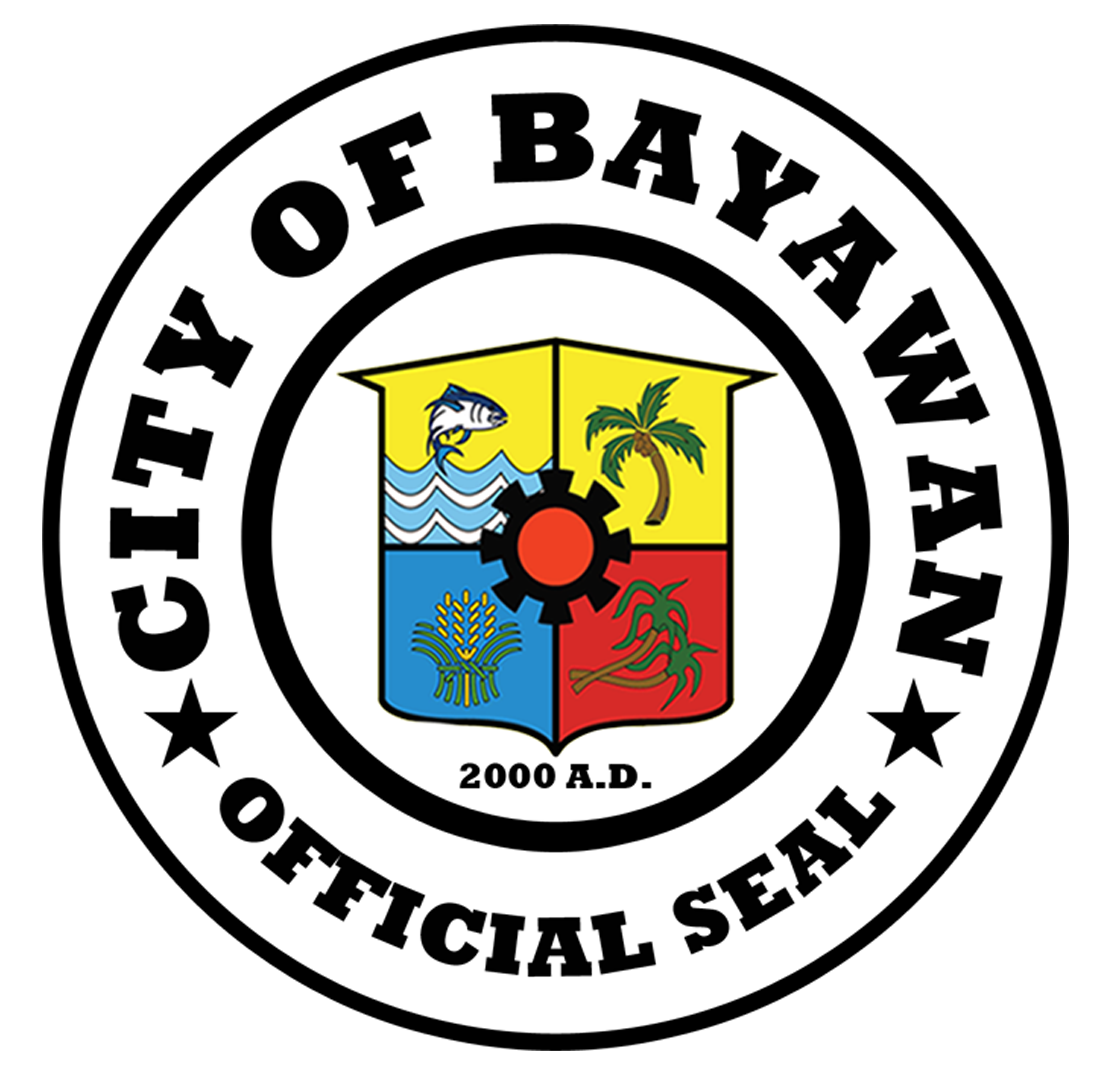
- Flag Seal
- Nickname: City of Agricultural Capital of the Province of Negros Oriental
- Anthem: "Ibayaw ang Bayawan"
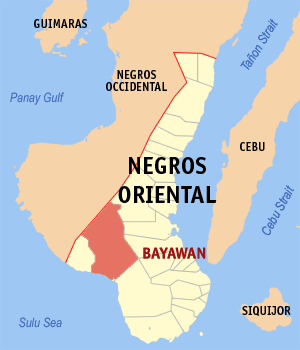
- Map of Negros Oriental showing the location of Bayawan
- Interactive map of Bayawan
- Location within the Philippines
- Coordinates: 9°22′N 122°48′E
- Country: Philippines
- Region: Negros Island Region
- Province: Negros Oriental
- District: 3rd district
- Founded: 1872
- Cityhood: December 23, 2000
- Named for: Visayan term bayaw, meaning "raise"
- Barangays: 28 (see Barangays)

Government
  - Type: Sangguniang Panlungsod
  - Mayor: John "Jack" T. Raymond Jr. (NPC)
  - Vice Mayor: Rusmar Ian D. Tijing (NPC)
  - Representative: Janice Degamo (Lakas)
  - City Council: Members: Mark Fidencio L. Aurelia; Stanley Brian R. Fortugaleza; Severino Salvador M. Capulso; Felipe O. Santiago, Jr.; Rolando B. Abrasaldo; Sharlou F. Jamin; Luis J. Sumalpong; Efleda A. Renacia; Karl T. Saraña; Ma. Luciana T. Tizon; Edilbert J. Boltiador ^{◌}; ◌ ex officio SK chairman
  - Electorate: 85,440 voters (2025)

Area
  - Total: 699.08 km^{2} (269.92 sq mi)
- Elevation: 225 m (738 ft)
- Highest elevation: 1,827 m (5,994 ft)
- Lowest elevation: 0 m (0 ft)

Population (2024 census)
  - Total: 126,744
  - Density: 181.30/km^{2} (469.57/sq mi)
  - Households: 29,403

Economy
  - Income class: 1st city income class
  - Poverty incidence: 35.02% (2023)
  - Revenue: ₱ 1,625 million (2024)
  - Assets: ₱ 6,580 million (2024)
  - Expenditure: ₱ 779.5 million (2024)

Service provider
  - Electricity: Negros Oriental 2 Electric Cooperative (NORECO 2)
- Time zone: UTC+8 (PST)
- ZIP code: 6221
- PSGC: 074606000
- IDD : area code: +63 (0)35
- Native languages: Cebuano; Magahat; Tagalog
- Website: www.bayawancity.gov.ph

Bayawan, officially the City of Bayawan (Cebuano: Dakbayan sa Bayawan), is a component city in the province of Negros Oriental, Philippines. According to the 2024 census, it has a population of 126,744 people.

Bayawan used to be known as New Tolong, and only had its modern name starting 1952. Bayawan became a chartered city in December 2000.

The town is home to the Minagahat language, the Indigenous language of Southern Negros as listed by Komisyon sa Wikang Filipino. The language is vital to the culture and arts of the people of southern Negros.

== Etymology ==
An altercation happened between a priest and the natives that used to live in the area. The town center was previously located in an uphill settlement called 'Omod', and a chapel was erected to serve the religious needs of the new converts. During a mass, a native threw a lance in the priest, who was raising the Holy Host at that time, instantly killing him.

The name "Bayawan" stems from the Visayan term "Bayaw"– to hoist or elevate, in reference to the priest's action just before his death.

== History ==
It was in 1751 when the Spanish friars first established their settlement. 116 years later, Tolong Nuevo (Bayawan's former name) had existed as early as 1868 as part of Tolong Viejo (now the Municipality of Santa Catalina). It was not until 1872 when she was formally organized as a pueblo.

In 1953, the name Tolong Nuevo was changed to Bayawan, by virtue of Republic Act 694 as approved by the 3rd congress of the Philippines, consigning the name “Tolong” into obscurity and deep oblivion soon slowly to be forgotten by the succeeding generations. This made Bayawan a separate municipality.

=== Cityhood ===
Bayawan, after meeting all of its requirements for its cityhood, became a city on December 23, 2000, via plebiscite that was set by COMELEC. It boasts its distinction as a "Character City" (International Association of Character Cities) and a pioneer "Healthy City" (DOH certified) in the Philippines. The Asian Institute of Management recognized the city as "one of the Top 10 Best Cities to Live In in the Philippines (Small Cities Category)" under its Competitive Cities Survey of 2007.

== Geography ==
Bayawan is located 102 kilometres (63 mi) from the provincial capital Dumaguete, 183 kilometres (114 mi) from Bacolod, and 95 kilometres (59 mi) from Kabankalan. It is a coastal city with a land area of 69,908 hectares (172,750 acres), the largest in the province and whole Negros island. This accounts for 13% of the province's land area. Mabinay bounds it to the north, Santa Catalina to the south, Tanjay to the east, Basay to the west, and it also shares a boundary with Kabankalan of Negros Occidental on the northwest. The coastline is 15 kilometres (9.3 mi) west to east, with 7 coastal barangays.

Bayawan City is subdivided into three development zones:

- The urban area constitutes only 2.3% (15.73 km^{2}) of the city's total area and contains the main institutional, commercial and central business district of the city. It functions as the main economic hub, while economic growth nodes are established in strategically located barangays in the hinterlands.
- The sub-urban area is about 14.7% (102.6 km^{2}) of the total area and is set to contain the agro-industrial zones, industrial zones and human settlements. The existing industrial activity (lime plant), the establishment of saw mills, and the identified industrial zones in the area show the natural pattern of development. Residential zones are considered in the sub-urban area to provide settlements for the people in the commercial center and in the industrial zones.
- The rural area accounts for 83.1% of the total land area and is basically agricultural. However, some barangays are identified to contain a high level of commerce, trade and agro-processing industry being the economic growth nodes of the city. These growth nodes are singled out due to their strategic geographic location while other rural barangays are mainly agricultural production areas.

=== Barangays ===
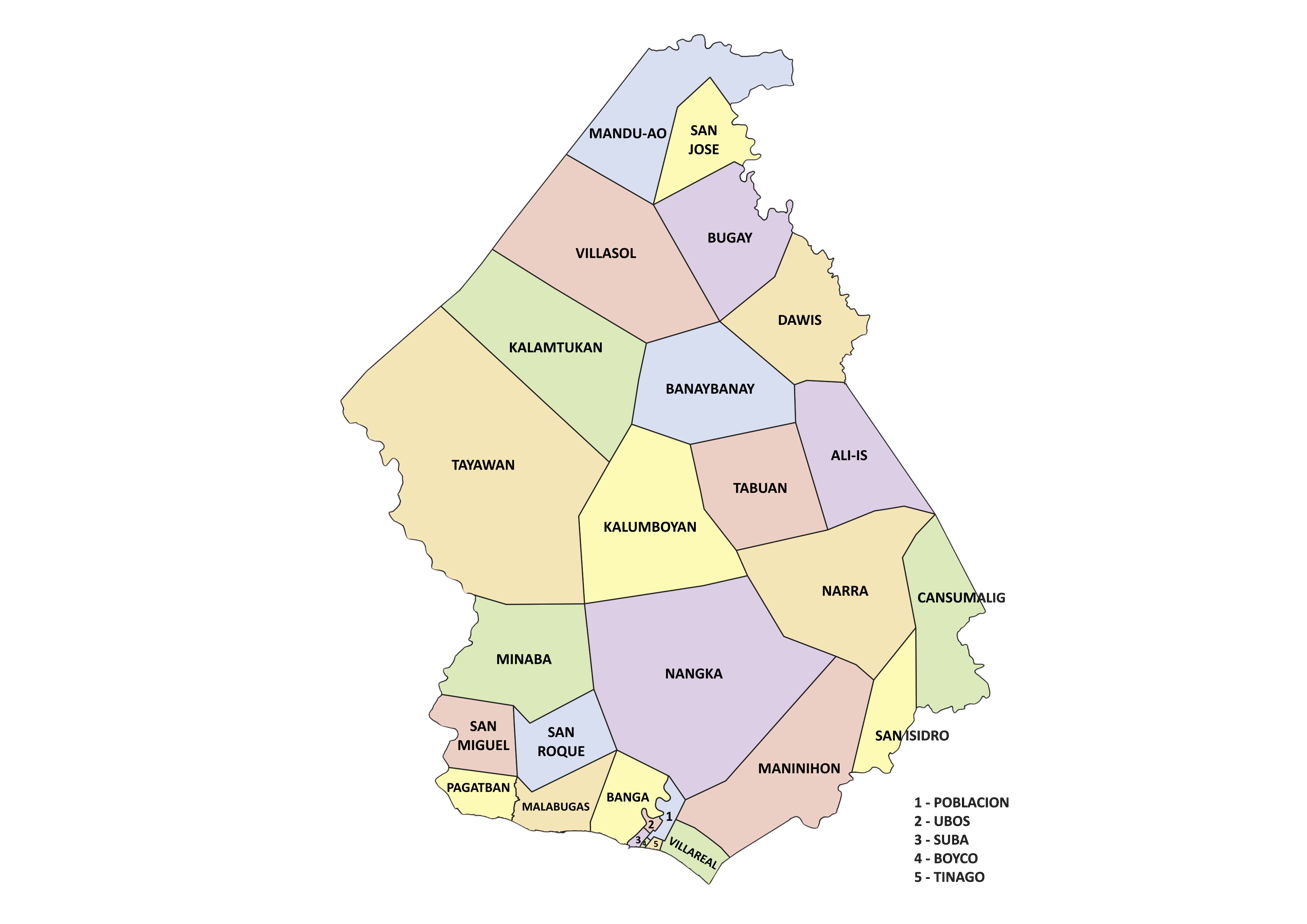
Political map of Bayawan

Bayawan is politically subdivided into 28 barangays. Each barangay consists of puroks and some have sitios.

Kalumboyan was formerly a sitio of Nangka, while Balabag (now Villareal) was a sitio of Manihihon. They were converted into independent barrios in 1955.

PSGC	Barangay	Population			±% p.a.	
		2024		2010		
074606001	Ali-is	2.4%	2,980	3,114	▾	−0.30%
074606002	Banaybanay	3.9%	4,896	3,596	▴	2.16%
074606003	Banga	6.0%	7,568	6,078	▴	1.53%
074606005	Boyco (Pob.)	1.1%	1,407	1,502	▾	−0.45%
074606006	Bugay	4.4%	5,607	4,982	▴	0.82%
074606007	Cansumalig	1.4%	1,715	2,402	▾	−2.30%
074606008	Dawis	3.7%	4,683	5,112	▾	−0.60%
074606009	Kalamtukan	2.9%	3,618	3,886	▾	−0.49%
074606010	Kalumboyan	5.5%	7,004	7,124	▾	−0.12%
074606011	Malabugas	4.8%	6,126	4,828	▴	1.66%
074606012	Mandu-ao	3.8%	4,780	4,575	▴	0.30%
074606013	Maninihon	5.9%	7,502	5,894	▴	1.68%
074606014	Minaba	2.3%	2,890	2,170	▴	2.00%
074606015	Nangka	8.4%	10,637	9,940	▴	0.47%
074606016	Narra	5.2%	6,603	5,707	▴	1.01%
074606017	Pagatban	1.7%	2,152	1,980	▴	0.58%
074606018	Poblacion	2.3%	2,921	2,787	▴	0.33%
074606028	San Isidro	1.0%	1,280	1,169	▴	0.63%
074606019	San Jose	1.9%	2,450	1,794	▴	2.18%
074606020	San Miguel	1.4%	1,731	1,652	▴	0.32%
074606021	San Roque	1.1%	1,452	1,872	▾	−1.74%
074606022	Suba (Pob.)	1.9%	2,412	2,532	▾	−0.34%
074606023	Tabuan	3.6%	4,539	4,770	▾	−0.34%
074606024	Tayawan	5.1%	6,419	5,585	▴	0.97%
074606025	Tinago (Pob.)	2.5%	3,191	3,240	▾	−0.11%
074606026	Ubos (Pob.)	1.3%	1,600	1,662	▾	−0.26%
074606027	Villareal	8.5%	10,730	10,047	▴	0.46%
074606004	Villasol	3.0%	3,854	4,074	▾	−0.38%
	Total		126,744	114,074	▴	0.73%

=== Climate ===
Under the Modified Coronas' Climate Classification system, Bayawan has two distinct climate seasons: the dry season, well pronounced in the months of January to May; and the wet season, in the months of June to December.

Climate data for Bayawan
Month	Jan	Feb	Mar	Apr	May	Jun	Jul	Aug	Sep	Oct	Nov	Dec	Year
Mean daily maximum °C (°F)	31 (88)	31 (88)	32 (90)	33 (91)	31 (88)	30 (86)	29 (84)	29 (84)	29 (84)	29 (84)	30 (86)	30 (86)	30 (87)
Mean daily minimum °C (°F)	22 (72)	22 (72)	22 (72)	24 (75)	25 (77)	25 (77)	25 (77)	25 (77)	25 (77)	25 (77)	24 (75)	23 (73)	24 (75)
Average precipitation mm (inches)	46 (1.8)	45 (1.8)	56 (2.2)	83 (3.3)	163 (6.4)	203 (8.0)	236 (9.3)	204 (8.0)	210 (8.3)	211 (8.3)	143 (5.6)	77 (3.0)	1,677 (66)
Average rainy days	12.1	9.8	14.3	17.5	26.0	27.8	28.4	26.9	26.7	27.9	23.3	17.2	257.9
Source: Meteoblue (Use with caution: this is modeled/calculated data, not measured locally.)

== Demographics ==
Population census of Bayawan
Year	Pop.	±% p.a.
1903	6,099	—
1918	10,283	+3.54%
1939	15,954	+2.11%
1948	10,608	−4.43%
1960	30,429	+9.18%
1970	44,615	+3.90%
1975	62,114	+6.86%
1980	71,153	+2.75%
1990	78,280	+0.96%
1995	90,953	+2.85%
2000	101,391	+2.36%
2007	110,250	+1.16%
2010	114,074	+1.25%
2015	117,900	+0.63%
2020	122,747	+0.85%
2024	126,744	+0.77%
Source: Philippine Statistics Authority

In the 2024 census, the city has a population of 126,744 people.

In 2000, 21,814 of 101,391 inhabitants of the city comprise the urban population. The population density is 180/km^{2}, which is manageable compared to other cities in the country.

== Economy ==
Poverty incidence of Bayawan (%)

Source: Philippine Statistics Authority

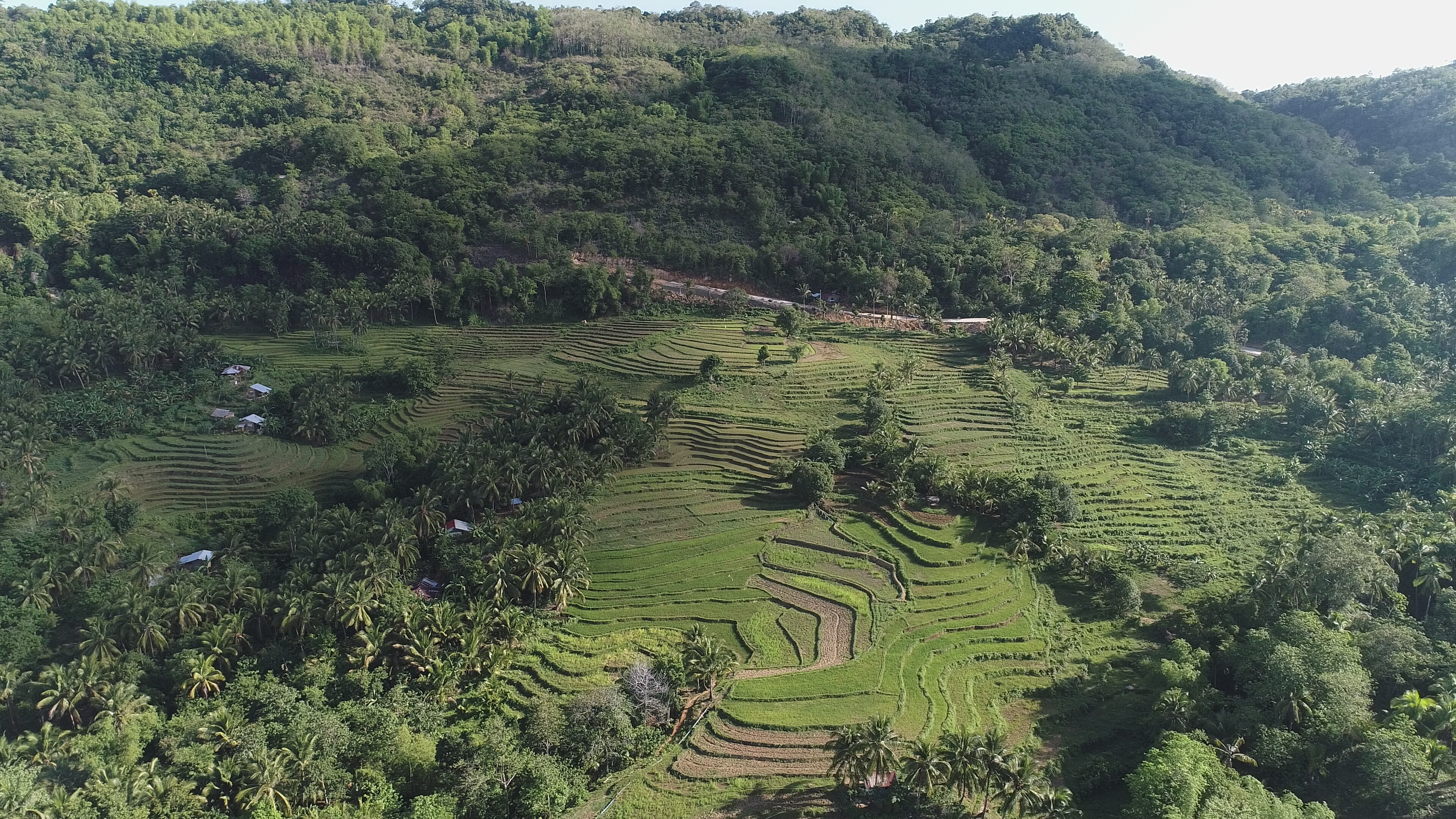
Rice fields in Bayawan

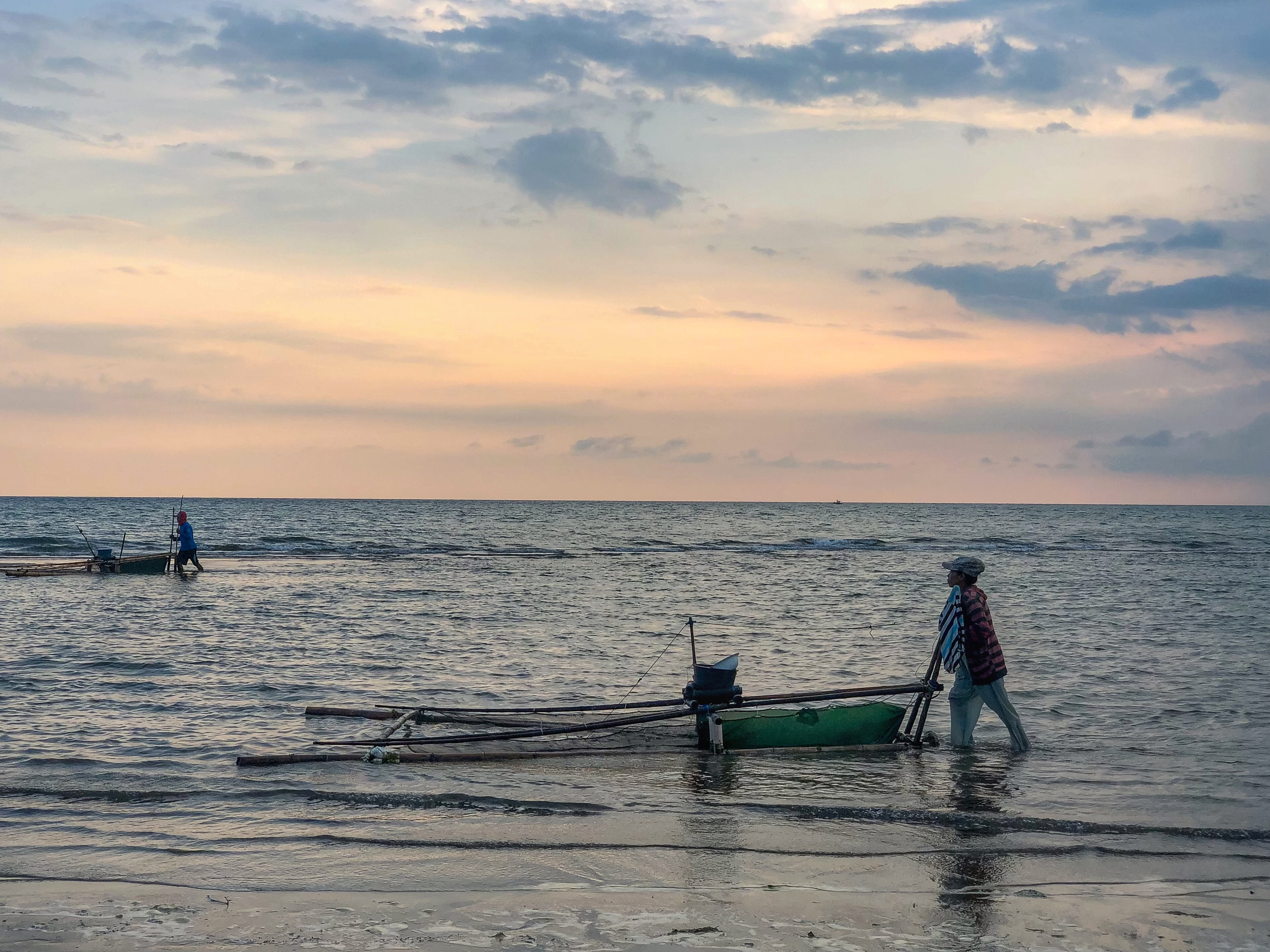
Local fishermen practicing push net fishing off the coast of Bayawan City Boulevard

Bayawan is still largely rural with only 2.25% of its total land area as urban area. The city is basically agricultural and its economy sits on an agricultural platform. Revenues from land farming, livestock production, aqua-culture activities and marine fishing are a major income contribution of the city. In 2000, the assessment of City Agriculture Office (CAO) indicated that agricultural production was valued at Php 2.3 Billion; 91.4% of which came from crop production, 7.9% from livestock production, and 0.7% from fisheries.

On a general scale, the city is not yet self-sufficient since its local revenue is only 12% of the total revenue and 88% comes from its Internal Revenue Allotment (IRA) (Year 2000 Data).

The city has several investment opportunities especially in the field of agro-industry and processing as well as in the processing of marine products. The vast agricultural resources and the LGU's thrust on agricultural development opens avenues of investing in feed mills, palm oil mills, rice mills, corn mills, storage and other farming and post harvest facilities and equipment. Besides agri-industries, the trading and auction markets are already well established in the hinterland barangays especially in Dawis and Kalumboyan. Moreover, the fishery industry and aqua-culture also offers wide business opportunities especially in the establishment of the proposed fishing port.

Another window for investors is in the transportation system. With the opening of the Bayawan-Kabankalan Road Network, more transport facilities will be required. The city is already recognized as a transport hub in South Negros, and planned to be enhanced further with improvement of the road network.

Currently, the people in the city are engaged in self-employment activities such as farming, fishing, trading or buying & selling activities. Resident professionals in the city are in abundance however majority often migrate seeking employment opportunities.

Puregold Bayawan opened last November 2019 as the first full-service mall in the city.

== Environment ==
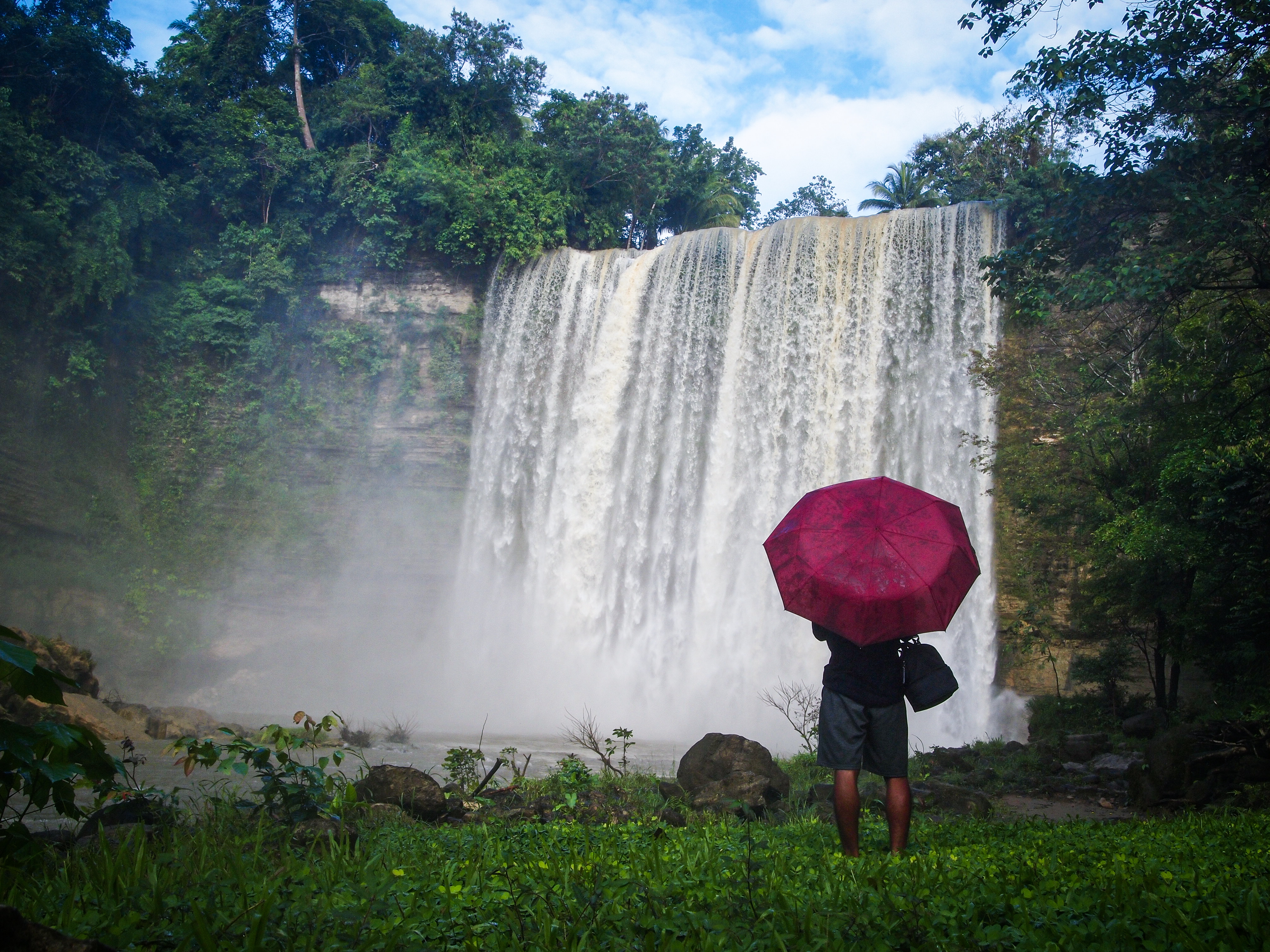
Niludhan Falls

Bayawan has one of the most barren mountains in the province. The Department of Environment & Natural Resources (DENR) have classified that 72.7% and 27.3% (198.05 km^{2}) of the total land area of Bayawan as A&D (alienable and disposable) and as forestlands respectively. However, recent assessment of land use utilization shows that only 17.8% of the total land area is used as forestlands. From these, it can be deduced that a large portion of the land area supposedly classified as forestlands are cultivated and unsuitably used. This situation can be attributed to the improper settling and farming practices of the people in the hinterlands. There are uncontrolled and unmonitored conversions of classified forestlands through slash and burn practices, then cultivation by the people in all parts of the upland barangays. However, these lands have or in the process of application for land titles (ownership).

The haphazard conversion and cultivation of the forestlands and denudation of the forest cover have resulted to the perennial problem of flooding in both upland and lowland barangays during rainy season. Its adverse effects include the severe siltation of the three rivers in the city and loss of soil fertility in the hinterlands due to soil erosion and landslides. In addition, some springs has become intermittent (no water flowing during dry season) because of the destruction of their watersheds.

In terms of sanitary sewerage and solid waste disposal, only the urban barangays have established sewerage in the city, however, the system drains directly into the rivers or directly into the sea without wastewater treatment. Other households utilize backyard septic tanks for their wastewater disposal. Solid wastes are collected by the LGU in the urban barangays and dumped into an open dumpsite in Barangay Banga. In anticipation for more solid wastes in the future as development spins in the city, a new dumping site was acquired in Barangay Nangka.

== Tourism ==
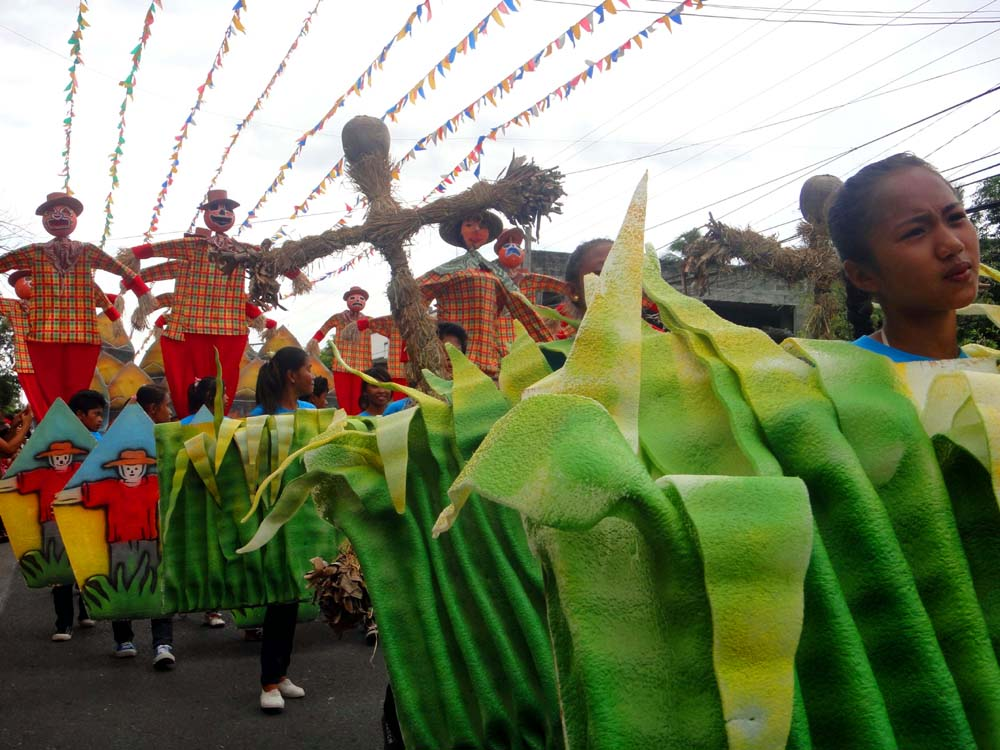
Tawo Tawo Festival in Bayawan City, February 2013

- Niludhan Falls
- Banay Banay Falls
- Lourdes Falls
- Bayawan Boulevard
- Bayawan City Plaza
- Bayawan Nature Reserve
- Narra Water Park
- Bayawan City Waste Management and Ecological Center

== Infrastructure ==
The main infrastructure of the city is concentrated in the city proper, although various dams for agricultural purposes have been constructed to improve irrigation in the farmlands. The connecting road to Kabankalan City has been completed. The 2.5 kilometers long boulevard fronting the beachfront in the city proper is among the longest in the province, and has become a major local venue and tourist attraction.

=== Transport ===
As of 2000 the city had 645.23 km of roads; 6.26% of which are National Roads; 19.41% are Provincial Roads; 1.79% are City Roads/Streets; and majority of which is 72.54% are Barangay Roads. Moreover, of the total road length only 5.75% are concrete roads and 2.81% asphalt roads. Of the unpaved roads, only 105 kilometers are gravel roads and the remaining 75.16% or 485 kilometers are earth fill roads. This translates that most of the roads especially the barangay roads in the upland barangays are not passable during bad weather conditions. The road situation affected for the residents in the hinterlands and the farmers have to shoulder very high cost of transporting their products.

The improvement of road infrastructure of the city especially the provincial road that connects the City Proper, Kalumboyan and Manduao to Kabankalan City in Negros Occidental is deemed to open up a new dimension in the economic and social activity of the city. The improvement of the city's transport route to Mabinay and towards the Cities of Tanjay and Bais is also apparent.

=== Bridges and spillways ===
There are 13 bridges with a total length of 494.95 meters that provide passengers over the different rivers or creeks in the city. Ten of these bridges are made of reinforced concrete, having a total length of 287.15 meters. Among these, seven with a total length of 277.85 meters are classified as National bridges and two with total length of 9.3 meters as Barangay. One is made of reinforced concrete with steel frame with a length of 175.7 meters and classified as National. Two (2) Barangay bridges with a total length of 32.1 meters are made of wood with steel bracing for pedestrian use.

One bridge (Milagrosa Bridge) located in Sitio Milagrosa Barangay Nangka is totally damaged. It is to be converted into a spillway.

Hugno Footbridge is a proposed bridge located in Hugno, Barangay Nangka.

There are 52 spillways present in different Barangays. Only 18 spillways were in excellent condition. Fourteen need improvement, repair, and to be developed. Two to be replaced with a bridge, seven need to be replaced, three were proposed, six to be re-constructed, and two were damaged and needs re-construction.

Generally, the inland barangays only have Level I (developed source) water system or Level II (communal waterworks) have just been recently established in Barangay Tabuan through BIARSP which is 1.6 million project. Only Barangay Nangka and Kalumboyan have level III water system that only the bario proper is being served, when there are no waterworks in the area especially as in the case in sitios the usual water sources are dug wells or springs.

In this aspect, the city has formulated policies and work programs to address the water problems of the city. To address the needs in the barangay, water sources are assessed and projects are outlined such that potable water can be conveyed into every household. New water sources (such as the Danapa Spring in Nangka) are looked into for feasible development into a water supply infrastructure project so that the water needs of the city's households, industries and commercial sectors will be met.

=== Flood control and drainage ===
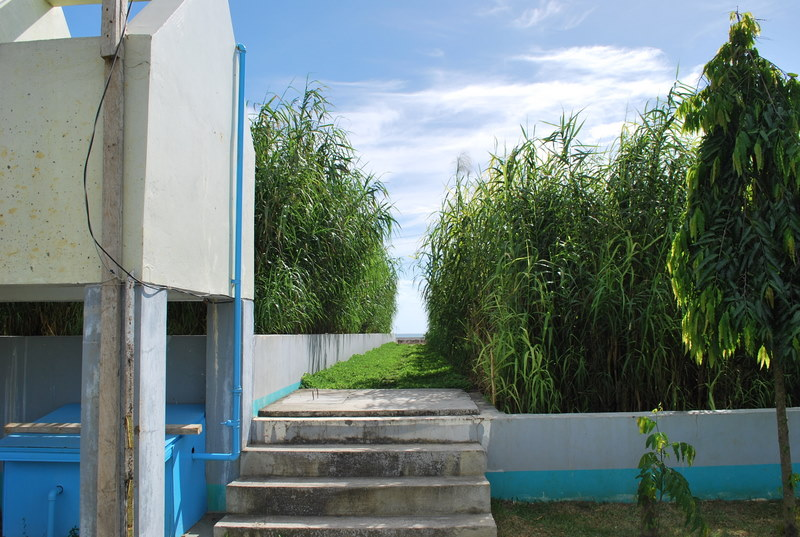
Constructed wetland and septage management system in Bayawan

The city proper of Bayawan experiences flooding during rainy season. The existing sewerage/drainage system is still inadequate and unable to effectively drain rainwater especially during strong typhoons. A reinforced concrete wharf located in Barangay Ubos and Suba along the Bayawan River, having a length of 326 meters served as a flood control structure. This structure is to hold the water especially during high tides and strong typhoons from coming/ flowing into the City Proper. This flood control mechanism however also needs improvement especially that the carrying capacity of the Bayawan River has been immensely reduced from its siltation.

Along the Coastal Margin (Pagatban, Malabugas, Banga and Villareal) and even in the upland barangays with low-lying built-up areas (such Minaba, Kalumboyan and Tabuan), flooding is also a perennial issue since there are no established drainage infrastructure projects in these barangays.

Identified short-term solutions of flooding include the proper maintenance and repair of existing infrastructure and the expansion of construction projects. Well-thought out drainage design and work programs are yet to be created. The long-term solution will include the rehabilitation of the watershed areas, reforestation, ripropping of riverbanks and maintenance of river easements such that soil erosion and subsequent siltation of the rivers will be reduced if not eliminated. This entails long-term integrated (multi-sectoral) and environment-focused planning, sound policy-making, political will and support, effective law enforcement, and monitoring.

Various command irrigation projects are now being implemented by the National Irrigation Administration (NIA). Among these are the Tabuan Communal Irrigation Project (CIP), Mantapi CIP and the upper/ lower Malabugas CIP of which the LGU have provided a Php 1 million equity per projects. Moreover, the LGU have allocated Php 22.02 million as counterpart for the proposed Bayawan CIP which has a total project cost of Php 130.47 million. The Bayawan CIP is among the priority projects of the 10 year Bayawan Urban Infrastructure Development Plan.

Keeping the community safe from disaster is a natural responsibility for the population of a city. Equally, Bayawan in its crossroad of development, being efficient and effective not only through environmental management, administrative processes, infrastructure and business, but particularly on disaster preparedness. With the increase in localized disasters has necessitated a corresponding increase in disaster preparedness and response capacity at the community and local government levels. The presence of early warning systems (LFEWS) linked to the Disaster Risk Reduction to provide accurate and timely advice to Barangay emergency response organizations.

=== Power ===
The source of power of the city is the Palinpinon Geothermal Power Plant and is delivered through the Negros Oriental II Electric Cooperative (NORECO II). In spite of the relatively close proximity of the city to and abundance of the power source, only 16.64% of the total number of households in the whole city are energized. Most of the households served are located in the urban areas. At present, NORECO II have served 4,106 household out of a potential 18,623 subscribers in the city. The energized household are those of the urban barangays and some rural barangays namely Malabugas, Pagatban, Nangka, San Roque, San Miguel, Minaba Tayawan, Tabuan, Dawis, Kalumboyan, Ali-is, Narra.

The low level of energization in the city can be directly attributed to the existing road conditions. It follows that the unfavorable road conditions make the installation of power infrastructures difficult. Besides, the current standard of living of the people in the hinterlands (which is way below the poverty level) does not provide an encouraging market for the electric Service provider. The low energization level of the City does not require much solution on finding of power sources or the installation of electrical infrastructures but more on improving the road conditions and finding socio-economic solutions.

=== Telecommunications ===
The city has telephone services, cellular mobile telephone services, wireless local coop services, satellite communication, print media, broadcast media (radio), telegraph/ telegram, postal services and fast courier delivery services provided for the public. The onset of fast and modern communication facilities resulted to the gradual phase-out of the traditional means of communication in the city.

Telecommunications in the city is along the current trends although more expansion and promotion is needed. The city has three telephone service companies: PLDT, Cruztelco and Globe Telecom. Cruztelco being the pioneer telephone company in the city has 400 lines installed and have an existing 131 subscribers. PLDT has 1,200 cables installed and an existing 616 subscribers and 122 potential subscribers with pending application. A cell site of Smart Communications is also in operation. National and provincial dailies and periodicals are delivered and available in the city. Also, the Local Government Unit (LGU) of Bayawan circulates copies of GABAYAN, an official newsletter of the city, every quarter. Radio and Television are the broadcast media available in the city. Radyo Natin has broadcast coverage up to the Municipalities of Santa Catalina, Basay, Pamplona, and Siaton. Television cable networks E & E Cable TV and Fil Products Cable TV operates in the city. Broadband internet access is also widely available from numerous internet cafes within the city proper. DOTC public calling stations exist in Barangay Nangka, Maninihon, San Roque and Dawis.

=== Housing ===
There are two Housing Projects owned by private developers—with an expected total units of 663 houses. The LGU has begun implementing low cost housing projects, starting with Fishermen's Village in Tawi-Tawi. Resettlement areas will be provided for the Informal Settlers within the urban area.

== Education ==
Bayawan City has three tertiary institutions, the Negros Oriental State University (formerly NONAS), City College of Bayawan and Southern Tech College. Nursery education is provided by day-care centers located in each urban barangay.

The public schools in Bayawan are administered by the Schools Division of Bayawan City.

=== High schools ===
- Abundio Agarpao, Sr. Memorial High School — Sitio Gamao, Narra
- Antonio M. Lacson, Sr. Memorial High School — Sitio Tavera, Nangka
- Atilano B. Cabangal Memorial High School — Sitio Milagrosa, Nangka
- Banaybanay High School — Banaybanay
- Bayawan National High School — Nat'l Highway, Villareal
- Bayawan City Science and Technology Education Center-HS — Cabcabon Hills, Banga
- Bugay National High School — Bugay
- Cansumalig High School — Cansumalig
- Dawis High School — Dawis
- Enzo Nicolai T. Teves High School — Sitio Tinastasan, Malabugas
- Kalamtukan High School — Kalamtukan
- Kalumboyan National High School — Kalumboyan
- Lapay National High School — Sitio Lapay, Dawis
- Manduaw National High School — Mandu-ao
- Minaba National High School — Minaba
- Narra High School — Narra
- Omod High School — Sitio Omod, Maninihon
- Pagatban High School — Pagatban
- San Jose High School — San Jose
- Tabuan Provincial Community High School — Tabuan
- Tayawan High School — Tayawan
- Villasol National High School — Villasol

Integrated schools:

- Ali-is Integrated School (formerly Ali-is ES) — Ali-is

=== Private schools ===
- Bayawan Angelicum Inc. — S. Martinez Street, Ubos
- Early Readers Montessorian School, Inc. — F. Teologia Street, Suba
- St. Augustine Academy of Bayawan, Inc. — Nat'l Highway, Ubos
- Southern Tech College Foundation, Inc. — Nat'l Highway, Villareal
- UCCP-Bayawan City Learning Center, Inc. — Zamora Street, Ubos
