= DYFL =

Radio station in Dumaguete, Philippines

Like Radio Dumaguete (DYFL)
Dumaguete; Philippines
- Broadcast area: Southern Negros Oriental and surrounding areas
- Frequency: 90.5 MHz
- Branding: 90.5 Like Radio

Programming
- Languages: Cebuano, Filipino
- Format: Contemporary MOR, News, Talk
- Network: Like Radio

Ownership
- Owner: Capitol Broadcasting Center

History
- First air date: 2014

Technical information
- Licensing authority: NTC
- Class: C, D, E
- Power: 5,000 watts
- ERP: 10,000 watts

DYFL (90.5 FM), broadcasting as 90.5 Like Radio, is a radio station owned and operated by Capitol Broadcasting Center. Its studios and transmitter are located at the 3rd floor, Doña Milagros Building, Pinili cor. Perdices St., Dumaguete, Negros Oriental.
