= DYAG-AM =

Hapi Radio (DYAG)
- Sagay; Philippines
- Broadcast area: Northern Negros Occidental and surrounding areas
- Frequency: 1125 kHz
- Branding: DYAG Hapi Radio

Programming
- Languages: Hiligaynon, Filipino
- Format: News, Public Affairs, Talk

Ownership
- Owner: Cadiz Radio and TV Network
- Sister stations: Hapi 104.7

History
- First air date: 1995
- Former frequencies: 630 kHz (1995-2000s); 1116 kHz (2000s-2010s)

Technical information
- Licensing authority: NTC
- Power: 5,000 watts

Links
- Website: http://hapiradio.weebly.com/

DYAG (1125 AM) Hapi Radio is a radio station owned and operated by Cadiz Radio and TV Network. Its studio and transmitter are located along Santan St., Brgy. Poblacion 2, Sagay, Negros Occidental.
