= DYSO =

Radyo Natin Hinigaran (DYSO)
- Hinigaran, Negros Occidental; Philippines
- Broadcast area: 4th and 5th District of Negros Occidental
- Frequency: 105.7
- Branding: Radyo Natin 105.7

Programming
- Languages: Hiligaynon, Filipino
- Format: Community radio

Ownership
- Owner: MBC Media Group
- Operator: JMV Broadcast Venture

History
- First air date: December 16, 1997
- Former frequencies: 105.9
- Call sign meaning: DY Southern Negros Occidental

Technical information
- Licensing authority: NTC
- Class: B C D E
- Power: 500 watts
- ERP: 1.05 kilowatt

Links
- Website: Radyo Natin

DYSO (105.7 FM), broadcasting as Radyo Natin 105.7, is a radio station which owned by MBC Media Group that broadcasts from JMV Broadcasting Complex, Moonrise Village, Barangay 3, Hinigaran, Negros Occidental in the Philippines.

Broadcasting with a power of 500 Watts from 4:00 AM to 12:00 MN. It is the first FM station in Hinigaran, Negros Occidental, Philippines.

== History ==
On December 16, 1997, MBC launched Radyo Natin. Composed of 100 FM stations strategically across the nation by using state-of-the-art satellite technology, Radyo Natin can reach audiences that have never been reached before by another radio station.

Radyo Natin Hinigaran was launched in the year 2000 from the old studio located at Farmer's Village, Barangay III, Hinigaran, and transferred to its current studio in Moonrise Village, Barangay III, Hinigaran.

On November 15, 2021, Radyo Natin Hinigaran along with sister stations launched their new logos and its new corporate slogan, Sama-Sama Tayo, Pilipino! (lit. We are all Filipinos!).

== Awards ==
Radyo Natin has been awarded as the Best Provincial FM Station in the Philippines for 3 consecutive years on the 21st, 22nd and 23rd KBP Golden Dove Awards (2012, 2013 and 2014).
