= DYAG-FM =

Hapi 104.7 (DYAG)
- Bacolod; Philippines
- Broadcast area: Northern Negros Occidental, parts of Iloilo and Guimaras
- Frequency: 104.7 MHz
- Branding: Hapi 104.7

Programming
- Languages: Hiligaynon, Filipino
- Format: Classic hits, Talk

Ownership
- Owner: Cadiz Radio and TV Network
- Sister stations: DYAG Hapi Radio

History
- First air date: 2016
- Former names: Muews Radio (2016-2022)

Technical information
- Licensing authority: NTC
- Power: 5 kW

Hapi 104.7 (DYAG 104.7 MHz) is an FM station owned and operated by Cadiz Radio and TV Network. Its studios and transmitter are located along Gatuslao St., Bacolod.

It was formerly known as 104.7 Muews Radio owned by Sagay Broadcasting Corporation from 2016 to 2022, when it went off the air. During that time, it was located in Talisay, Negros Occidental.
