= DYMD-FM =

Radio station in Dumaguete City, Philippines

Energy FM Dumaguete (DYMD)
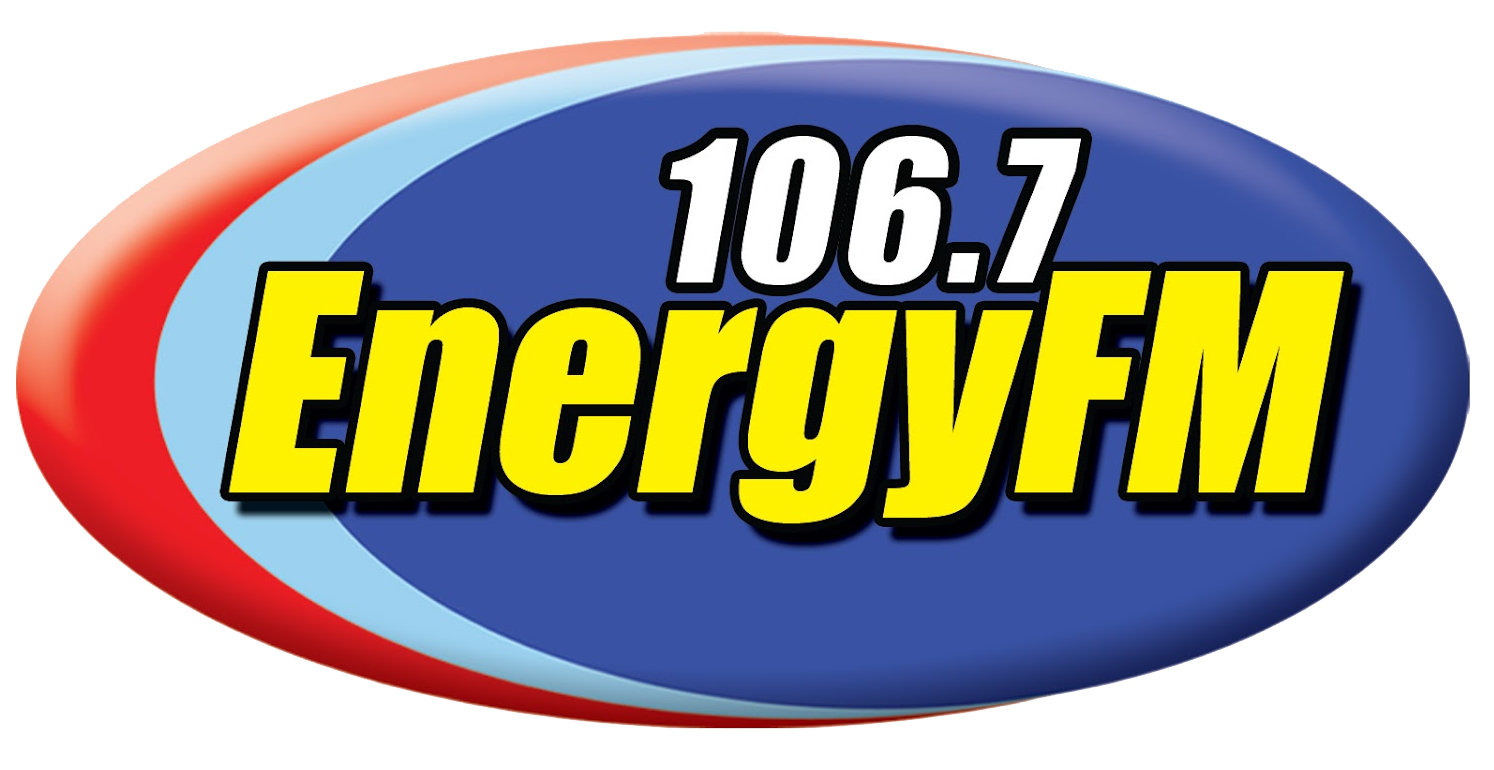
- Dumaguete; Philippines
- Broadcast area: Southern Negros Oriental and surrounding areas
- Frequency: 93.7 MHz
- Branding: 93.7 Energy FM

Programming
- Languages: Cebuano, Filipino
- Format: Contemporary MOR, OPM
- Network: Energy FM

Ownership
- Owner: Ultrasonic Broadcasting System Inc.

History
- First air date: January 2013
- Call sign meaning: Metro Dumaguete; Matuwid na Daan (former monicker)

Technical information
- Licensing authority: NTC
- Power: 5,000 watts
- ERP: 37,500 watts
- Transmitter coordinates: 9.297515°N 123.302638°E

Links
- Website: http://www.energyfm.ph/

DYMD (93.7 FM), broadcasting as 93.7 Energy FM, is a radio station owned and operated by Ultrasonic Broadcasting System. The station's studio and transmitter are located at Robinsons Dumaguete, Brgy Calindagan, Dumaguete.

== History ==
The station began operations in January 2013 as a propaganda station promoting the Liberal Party as part of their campaign for the 2013 election, primarily promoting gubernatorial candidate Josy Limkaichong. The station used most of the airtime to promote local Liberal Party candidates. However, despite the station being launched, an opinion piece written for The Negros Chronicle stated that the new station did not have any permits from the city government and had rushed a license to operate permit from the National Telecommunications Commission before the campaigning period began. At that time, the Energy FM brand was on 96.7, which at that time was branded as Star Energy FM.

In October 2013, DYMD was acquired by Ultrasonic Broadcasting System and relaunched as Energy FM. A month later, DYEM, which bore the said branding was rebranded as Bai Radio.
