= Mabinay =

Municipality in Negros Oriental, Philippines

- Municipality
- Municipality of Mabinay
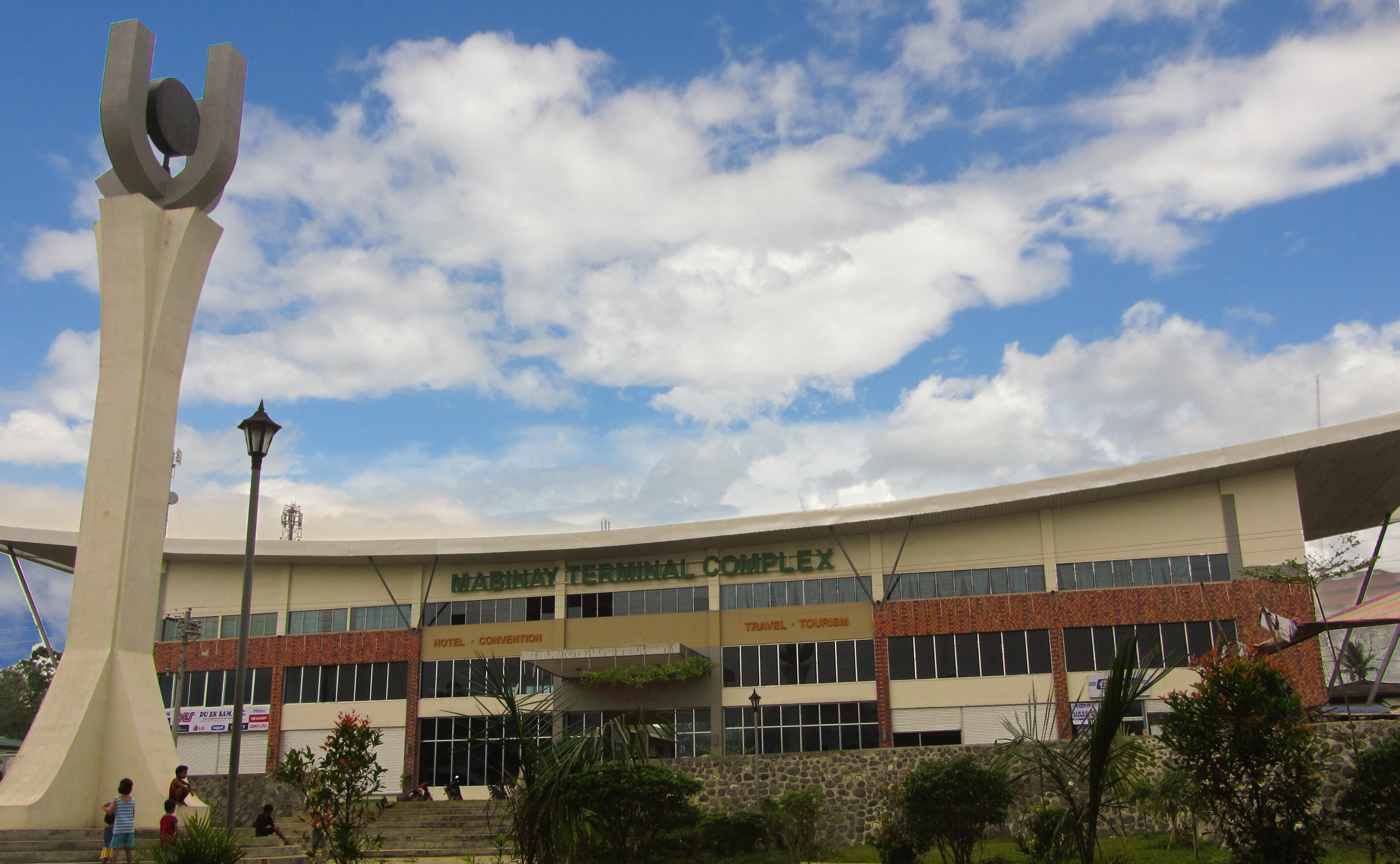
- Mabinay Terminal Complex

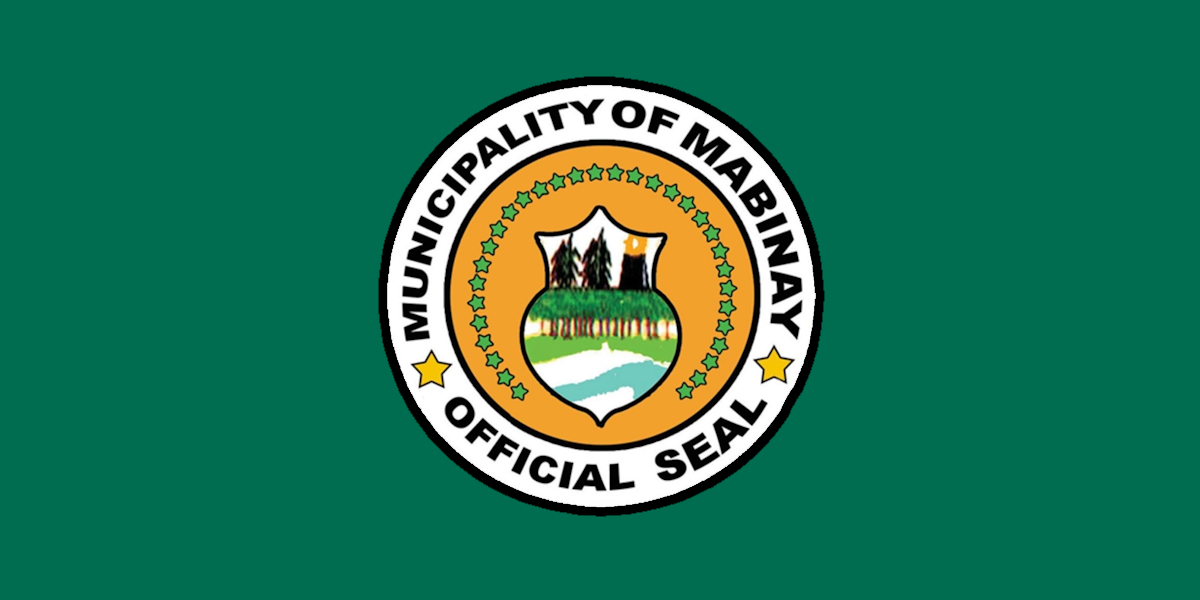
- Flag Seal
- Nickname: The Caves Capital of the Philippines
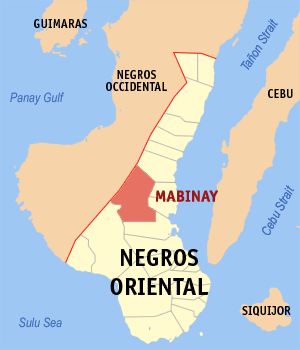
- Map of Negros Oriental with Mabinay highlighted
- Interactive map of Mabinay
- Location within the Philippines
- Coordinates: 9°44′N 122°55′E
- Country: Philippines
- Region: Negros Island Region
- Province: Negros Oriental
- District: 2nd district
- Founded: June 21, 1959
- Barangays: 32 (see Barangays)

Government
  - Type: Sangguniang Bayan
  - Mayor: Ernie T. Uy
  - Vice Mayor: Joeterry A. Uy (Lakas)
  - Representative: Maisa Sagarbarria (Lakas)
  - Municipal Council: Members: Ejian A. Uy; Jonathan P. Dingal; Godiardo M. Codera, Jr.; Larry A. Rodriguez; Enozario T. Baldoza; Elan N. Cadayday; Elvie M. Torres; Eduardo K. Solon; Edwin Garcia ^{‡}; Rica G. Abrio ^{◌}; ‡ ex officio ABC president; ◌ ex officio SK chairman
  - Electorate: 54,133 voters (2025)

Area
  - Total: 319.44 km^{2} (123.34 sq mi)
- Elevation: 153 m (502 ft)
- Highest elevation: 426 m (1,398 ft)
- Lowest elevation: 68 m (223 ft)

Population (2024 census)
  - Total: 85,770
  - Density: 268.5/km^{2} (695.4/sq mi)
  - Households: 20,331

Economy
  - Income class: 1st municipal income class
  - Poverty incidence: 39.29% (2023)
  - Revenue: ₱ 361.3 million (2024)
  - Assets: ₱ 1,775 million (2024)
  - Expenditure: ₱ 191.5 million (2024)
  - Liabilities: ₱ 737.3 million (2024)

Service provider
  - Electricity: Negros Oriental 1 Electric Cooperative (NORECO 1)
- Time zone: UTC+8 (PST)
- ZIP code: 6208
- PSGC: 074614000
- IDD : area code: +63 (0)35
- Native languages: Cebuano; Ata; Tagalog; Hiligaynon

Mabinay, officially the Municipality of Mabinay, is a municipality in the province of Negros Oriental, Philippines. According to the 2024 census, it has a population of 85,770 people, making it the most-populous municipality in Negros Oriental.

== History ==
Folklore has it that a woman named Binay fell in love with the son of her father's rival chieftain. Her father ended the affair by having her lover killed. Binay grieved. Mother Nature took the weeping maiden into her bosom. Where Binay was laid to rest, a spring broke forth. According to the legend, she weeps to this day, feeding Mabinay Spring, one of the town's many alluring attractions.

It had over 100 known caves, including the popular Pandalihan, Panligawan and Gasidlak, each one with its own distinctive features ranging from fascinating to awesome. A team of Belgian and Dutch cavers determined Odloman Cave to be the second longest in the Philippines.

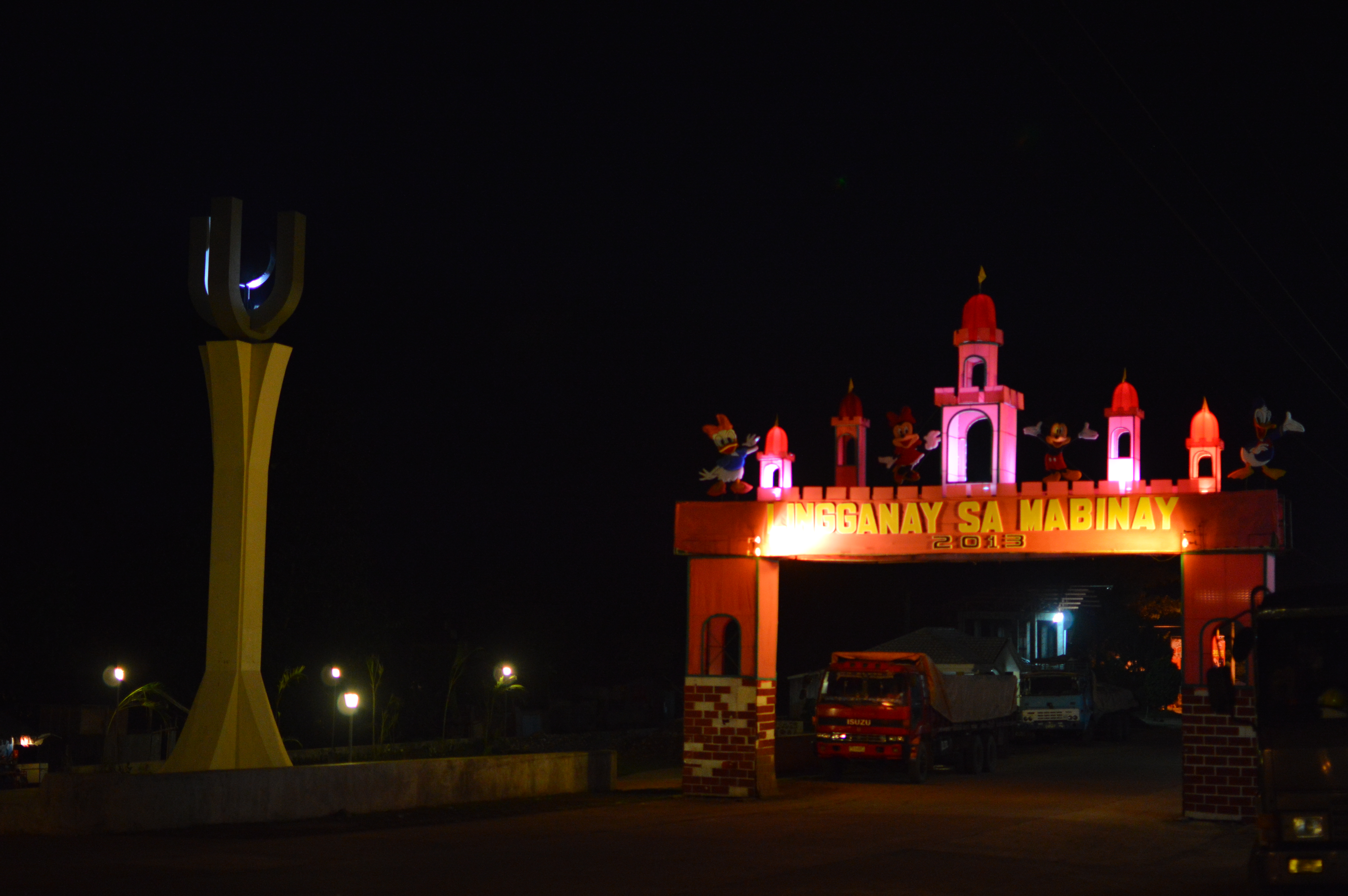
Welcome arch in Mabinay

Under Republic Act No. 2469, which was signed by President Carlos P. Garcia in 1959, Mabinay was formally created from the fourteen sitios that seceded from the then-municipality of Bais. In 1966, under Republic Act No. 4818, the municipality's territory was enlarged, with four more sitios added from Manjuyod and eight from Bais.

Mabinay produces rice and corn, copra, soybeans and peanuts. Its principal crop, sugar cane, makes it an important member of the north's sugar district. It is a border town: the provincial highway runs through it and links Negros Oriental with its sister province.

On the morning of March 3, 2018, six youth activists on an exposure trip with farmers were arrested in Barangay Luyang by the Philippine Army after 1st Lt. Prad Adoptante and 2nd Lt. Reymart Africa engaged in a firefight with communist rebels earlier in the day, with the six being charged with illegal possession of firearms and explosives and suspected as members of the New People's Army. Collectively known as the "Mabinay 6" in the media, among them were Myles Albasin, a 21-year-old activist from Cagayan de Oro and Anakbayan member working as a journalist for Aninaw Productions. On September 22, 2025, seven years after the arrest, the six were acquitted of the charges by the Dumaguete Regional Trial Court Branch 42, with the court ruling the prosecution to have failed to "establish the guilt of all the six accused" due to "numerous loopholes in the evidence".

== Geography ==
Mabinay is situated roughly in the central part of the island of Negros abutting the western side of the provincial boundary. The municipality of Ayungon bounds it in the north, the City of Bais in the south, the municipalities of Bindoy and Manjuyod and a portion of Bais in the east, and the city of Kabankalan in the province of Negros Occidental in the west.

=== Barangays ===
Mabinay is politically subdivided into 32 barangays. Each barangay consists of puroks and some have sitios.

PSGC	Barangay	Population			±% p.a.	
		2024		2010		
074614001	Abis	4.2%	3,603	2,706	▴	2.01%
074614002	Arebasore	2.3%	1,957	1,548	▴	1.64%
074614003	Bagtic	4.1%	3,549	3,100	▴	0.94%
074614005	Banban	1.4%	1,185	1,073	▴	0.69%
074614006	Barras	3.1%	2,662	2,641	▴	0.06%
074614007	Bato	2.8%	2,413	2,096	▴	0.98%
074614008	Bugnay	0.9%	800	853	▾	−0.44%
074614009	Bulibulihan	1.6%	1,406	1,149	▴	1.41%
074614010	Bulwang	3.0%	2,535	2,191	▴	1.02%
074614011	Campanun-an	2.6%	2,197	2,947	▾	−2.02%
074614012	Canggohob	2.1%	1,828	1,531	▴	1.24%
074614013	Cansal-ing	1.5%	1,280	1,392	▾	−0.58%
074614014	Dagbasan	3.0%	2,573	1,773	▴	2.62%
074614015	Dahile	4.7%	4,035	3,975	▴	0.10%
074614016	Himocdongon	3.3%	2,855	2,260	▴	1.64%
074614017	Hagtu	1.7%	1,475	1,616	▾	−0.63%
074614018	Inapoy	3.3%	2,800	2,214	▴	1.64%
074614019	Lamdas	1.7%	1,468	1,537	▾	−0.32%
074614020	Lumbangan	5.9%	5,083	4,953	▴	0.18%
074614021	Luyang	2.2%	1,875	1,575	▴	1.22%
074614022	Manlingay	1.0%	866	800	▴	0.55%
074614023	Mayaposi	3.3%	2,868	2,444	▴	1.12%
074614024	Napasu-an	1.1%	935	941	▾	−0.04%
074614025	New Namangka	0.7%	570	370	▴	3.05%
074614026	Old Namangka	1.8%	1,541	1,033	▴	2.82%
074614027	Pandanon	3.5%	3,006	2,484	▴	1.33%
074614028	Paniabonan	4.1%	3,518	3,373	▴	0.29%
074614029	Pantao	5.1%	4,358	4,014	▴	0.57%
074614030	Poblacion	8.2%	7,066	6,132	▴	0.99%
074614031	Samac	3.8%	3,270	3,293	▾	−0.05%
074614032	Tadlong	3.0%	2,606	1,912	▴	2.17%
074614033	Tara	5.6%	4,770	4,261	▴	0.79%
	Total		85,770	74,187	▴	1.01%

=== Climate ===
Under the Köppen climate classification, Mabinay has a tropical monsoon climate. Unlike other municipalities and cities in Negros Oriental, Mabinay is situated further inland, making its mean temperatures slightly cooler compared to municipalities and cities that are on the coastline.

Climate data for Mabinay, Negros Oriental
Month	Jan	Feb	Mar	Apr	May	Jun	Jul	Aug	Sep	Oct	Nov	Dec	Year
Mean daily maximum °C (°F)	29 (84)	30 (86)	31 (88)	32 (90)	30 (86)	29 (84)	28 (82)	28 (82)	28 (82)	28 (82)	29 (84)	29 (84)	29 (85)
Mean daily minimum °C (°F)	21 (70)	21 (70)	22 (72)	23 (73)	24 (75)	24 (75)	24 (75)	24 (75)	24 (75)	24 (75)	23 (73)	23 (73)	23 (73)
Average precipitation mm (inches)	45 (1.8)	37 (1.5)	62 (2.4)	93 (3.7)	190 (7.5)	259 (10.2)	284 (11.2)	236 (9.3)	244 (9.6)	247 (9.7)	162 (6.4)	86 (3.4)	1,945 (76.7)
Average rainy days	10.8	8.4	12.7	16.3	26.7	28.5	29.1	28.0	27.4	28.5	23.4	15.5	255.3
Source: Meteoblue (Use with caution: this is modeled/calculated data, not measured locally.)

== Demographics ==
Population census of Mabinay
Year	Pop.	±% p.a.
1960	14,585	—
1970	33,785	+8.75%
1975	35,336	+0.90%
1980	46,871	+5.81%
1990	58,935	+2.32%
1995	62,939	+1.24%
2000	67,001	+1.35%
2007	70,548	+0.71%
2010	74,187	+1.85%
2015	78,864	+1.17%
2020	82,953	+1.07%
2024	85,770	+0.80%
Source: Philippine Statistics Authority

== Economy ==
Poverty incidence of Mabinay (%)

Source: Philippine Statistics Authority

== Tourism ==
Mabinay is known for its caves. The Odloman Cave is one of the largest caves in the Philippines, with 8,870 metres (29,100 ft) long and Cayaso Cave, the ninth longest cave in the country measuring 2,222 metres (7,290 ft) long.

Aside from the caves, Mabinay also has rivers and natural springs. One of its known natural spring is located at the heart of the municipality, the Mabinay spring. Ideal for family outing, swimming, kayaking, it also serves as the main water resource of the main town. It is about a 3 to 5 minute ride with tricycle, jeepney or a bus from the town center.

== Healthcare ==
Mabinay itself has a small government-run hospital. Mabinay Medicare Community Hospital provides both in emergency outpatients services and inpatient services. It is located directly behind the Municipal Hall.

Mabinay Health Center is one of the three health centers that serve the town.

== Transportation ==
Motorcycles (also locally known as habal-habal), tricycles, jeepneys, and buses are the major modes of transportation in the municipality. Mabinay has a bus terminal that serves Ceres buses in transit from either Bacolod or Dumaguete.

The municipality is easily accessible through the Bais–Kabankalan road which cuts through the entire town. It is also directly connected to Ayungon through the Ayungon-Tambo road and to the city of Bayawan through the Bayawan-Mabinay road. Travel from Dumaguete is about two hours.

Mabinay is 87 kilometres (54 mi) north-west of the provincial capital, Dumaguete, and 128 kilometres (80 mi) from Bacolod.

== Education ==
On June 16, 1997, the Sangguniang Bayan (Municipal Council) Resolution No. 94 established the Mabinay Institute of Technology (MIT), a technical college operated with the approval of the Department of Education, Culture and Sports. On June 25, 2004, MIT was integrated into the newly converted university, Negros Oriental State University by virtue of the university charter, Republic Act No. 9299 signed by President Gloria Macapagal Arroyo. It became known as Mabinay Campus (NORSU-M).

The public schools in the town of Mabinay are administered by four school districts under the Schools Division of Negros Oriental.

=== Primary and elementary schools ===
- Abis Elementary School — Abis
- Alagasihan Elementary School — Sitio Alagasihan, Arebasore
- Arebasore Elementary School — Arebasore
- Bagtic Elementary School — Bagtic
- Baliw Elementary School — Sitio Baliw, Bagtic
- Banban Elementary School — Banban
- Barang-barang Primary School — Sitio Barang-barang, Mayaposi
- Barras Elementary School — Barras
- Basakan Elementary School — Sitio Basakan, Pandanon
- Bato Elementary School — Bato
- Binantangan Elementary School — Sitio Binantangan, Dahile
- Bugnay Elementary School — Bugnay
- Bulibulihan Elementary School — Bulibulihan
- Bulwang Elementary School — Bulwang
- Campo-aling Elementary School — Sitio Campo-aling, Mayaposi
- Canggohob Elementary School — Canggohob
- Cansal-ing Elementary School — Cansal-ing
- Cantombol Elementary School — Sitio Cantombol, Canggohob
- Capanun-an Elementary School — Campanun-an
- Dagbasan Elementary School — Dagbasan
- Dahile Elementary School — Dahile
- Danawan Elementary School — Sitio Danawan, Tara
- Don Cristito C. Tirambulo Memorial Elementary School — Paniabonan
- Hagtu Elementary School — Hagtu
- Himocdungon Elementary School — Himocdongon
- Inapoy Elementary School — Inapoy
- Lamdas Elementary School — Lamdas
- Lanot Elementary School — Sitio Lanot, Pantao
- Lapong Elementary School — Sitio Lapong, Dahile
- Lower Capanun-an Elementary School — Campanun-an
- Lumbangan Central School — Lumbangan
- Luyang Elementary School — Luyang
- Mabinay Central School — Pomelo Street, Poblacion
- Mampalasan Elementary School — Sitio Mampalasan, Bagtic
- Manlingay Elementary School — Manlingay
- Nabaliwan Elementary School — Sitio Nabaliwan, Samac
- Namangka Elementary School — Old Namangka
- Napasu-an Elementary School — Napasu-an
- New Namangka Elementary School — New Namangka
- Old Namangka Elementary School — Old Namangka
- Pandanon Elementary School — Pandanon
- Pantao Elementary School — Pantao
- Pantao Brgy. Site Elementary School — Pantao
- Pinayon-an Elementary School — Sitio Pinayon-an, Bato
- Pedro Gobuyan, Sr. Memorial Elementary School — Mayaposi
- Samac Elementary School — Samac
- Tadlong Elementary School — Tadlong
- Tampa Elementary School — Sitio Tampa, Inapoy
- Tara Elementary School — Tara
- Tingtingon Elementary School — Sitio Tingtingon, Cansal-ing

=== Secondary schools ===
- Bagtic National High School — Bagtic
- Barras Annex National High School — Barras
- Benedicto P. Tirambulo Memorial National High School — Paniabonan
- Campanun-an Provincial Community High School — Campanun-an
- Canggohob High School — Canggohob
- Cansal-ing Provincial Community High School — Cansal-ing
- Dahile Provincial Community High School — Dahile
- Inapoy High School — Inapoy
- Mabinay National High School — Naranghita Street, Poblacion
- Mabinay Science High School — Poblacion
- Manlingay High School — Manlingay
- Mayaposi Community High School — Mayaposi
- Pantao National High School — Pantao
- Tara Provincial Community High School — Tara

=== Private schools ===
- Sto. Niño High School — Lumbangan
