= Maria Macahig Memorial High School =

Public high school in Negros Oriental, Philippines

Location
- NIR (Negros Island Region); Siaton, Negros Oriental 6219; Philippines
- Coordinates: 9°07′58″N 122°55′11″E

Information
- Former names: Bonawon Barangay High School
- School type: Public High School (Junior and Senior)
- Motto: PAG-ASA
- Established: 1970 (Bonawon Barangay High School)
- School district: Siaton West District
- Grades: 7 to 12
- Affiliations: DepEd

Maria Macahig Memorial High School or MMMHS, formerly known as Bonawon Barangay High School, is public national high school located in Bonawon, Siaton, Negros Oriental. The school follows the Basic Education Curriculum-Restructured ( BEC-R). It is the oldest public high school in the municipality of Siaton, and is situated about 69 km from Dumaguete, and about 19 km from the municipality proper.

== History ==
Maria Macahig Memorial High School is named after the late mother of the donor, Cristita P. Macahig. MMMHS started its operation in 1970. It was first known as Bonawon Barangay High School. It opens its door to high school students not only from barangay Bonawon, but also to the neighboring barangays and municipalities.

== Campus life ==
The whole campus is totally green in color not of the paint but because of the green grass and trees growing in the campus premises. The school won as the greenest campus a couple of years ago.

The school has a school paper named The Lampara, which is circulated every school year.

Various activities are celebrated every month in the campus grounds.

The school also participates in different contests (sports, mathematics, science, literary, etc.) in provincial, regional and even in national level.
