= Lake Balanan =

Lake in Negros Oriental, Philippines

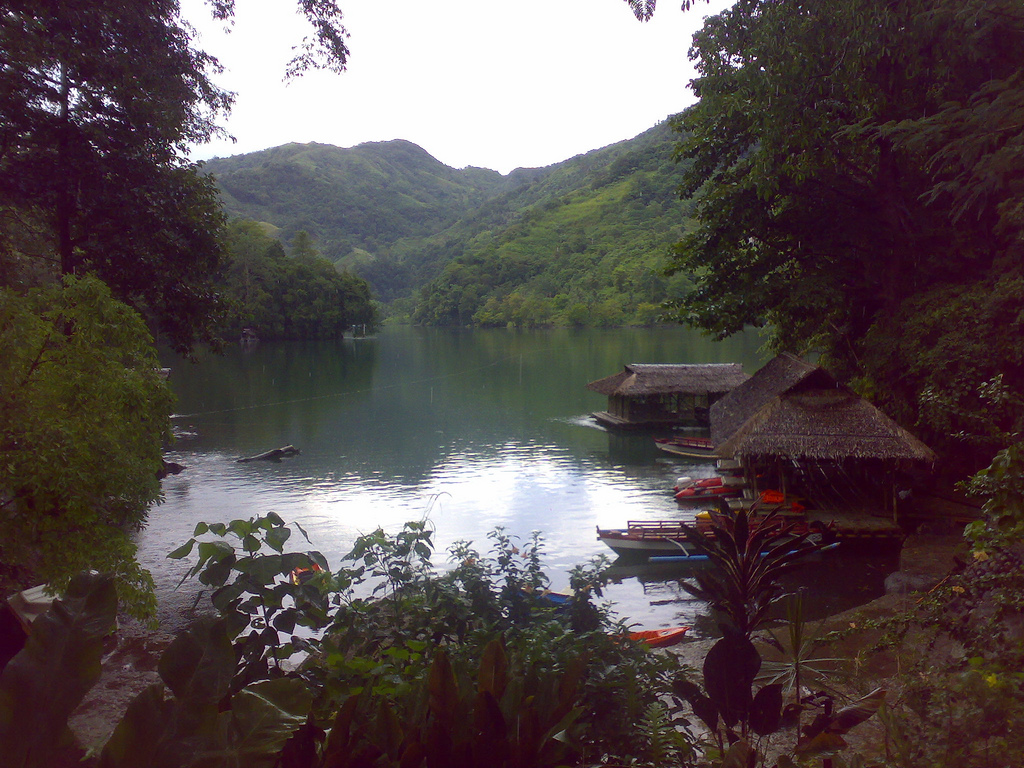

- Location within the Philippines
- Location: Negros Oriental
- Coordinates: 9°8′16″N 122°59′55″E
- Primary inflows: Lamarao Creek; Balanan Creek; Nasig-id Creek
- Primary outflows: Balanan River
- Basin countries: Philippines
- Surface area: 25 ha (0.25 km^{2})
- Shore length^{1}: 3.5 km (2.17 mi)
- Surface elevation: 237 m (777.56 ft)
- Settlements: Siaton
- ^{1} Shore length is not a well-defined measure.

Lake Balanan is a lake situated in Siaton, Negros Oriental in the Philippines. It is a freshwater lake in the forested mountains of the southern portion of the island of Negros, with a shape resembling a figure of eight, the narrowest point between the two main portions of the lake being only 90 metres (300 ft) wide. The lake is surrounded by mountain ranges, and is fed by three tributaries, all located in the northern end. These are the Lamarao Creek at the northeastern corner with two waterfalls, the Balanan Creek at the middle of the northern end with another waterfall, and the Nasig-id Creek at the northwestern end.

The lake has a humid tropical climate with two pronounced seasons, a dry season from November to April and a wet season for the rest of the year.

The lake was formed by a tectonic earthquake with the magnitude of a 6.8 on the Richter scale that hit the southern portion of the island of Negros, and caused landslides in the southern ends of both the Balanan and Nasig-id ranges in Siaton. The fallen rocks and soil dammed the Balanan River that flowed between these mountain ranges forming a 25-hectare (62-acre) "humerus" bone-formed lake oriented along the Northwest-Southeast line.

The lake and surrounding forests are currently being managed as a Watershed Area by the Bureau of Forest Development. A proposal has been made to designate the area as a Game Refuge and Wildlife Sanctuary to protect the large population of bats and other wildlife. This proposal was endorsed by the Department of Environment and Natural Resources, Region 7, in January 1987.

== History ==
At 5 pm on May 5, 1925, the town of Siaton was hit by an earthquake that registered 6.8 on the Richter Scale. The quake triggered a landslide that created a natural dam. The dam, called Sampong (meaning "to close"), blocked the flow of Balanan River, turning it into a lake.
