= Negros Oriental =

Negros Oriental Sidlakang Negros
- Province
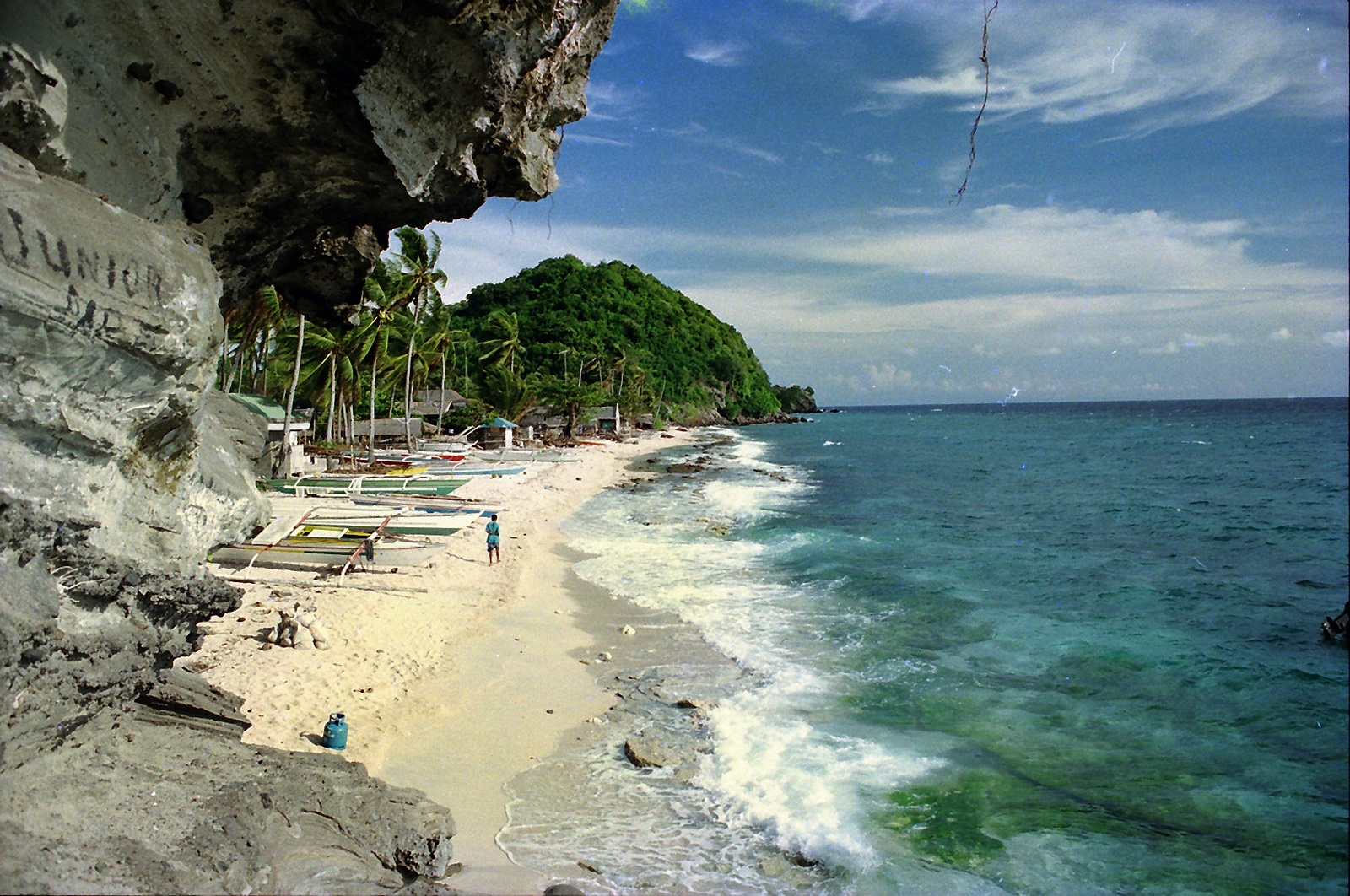
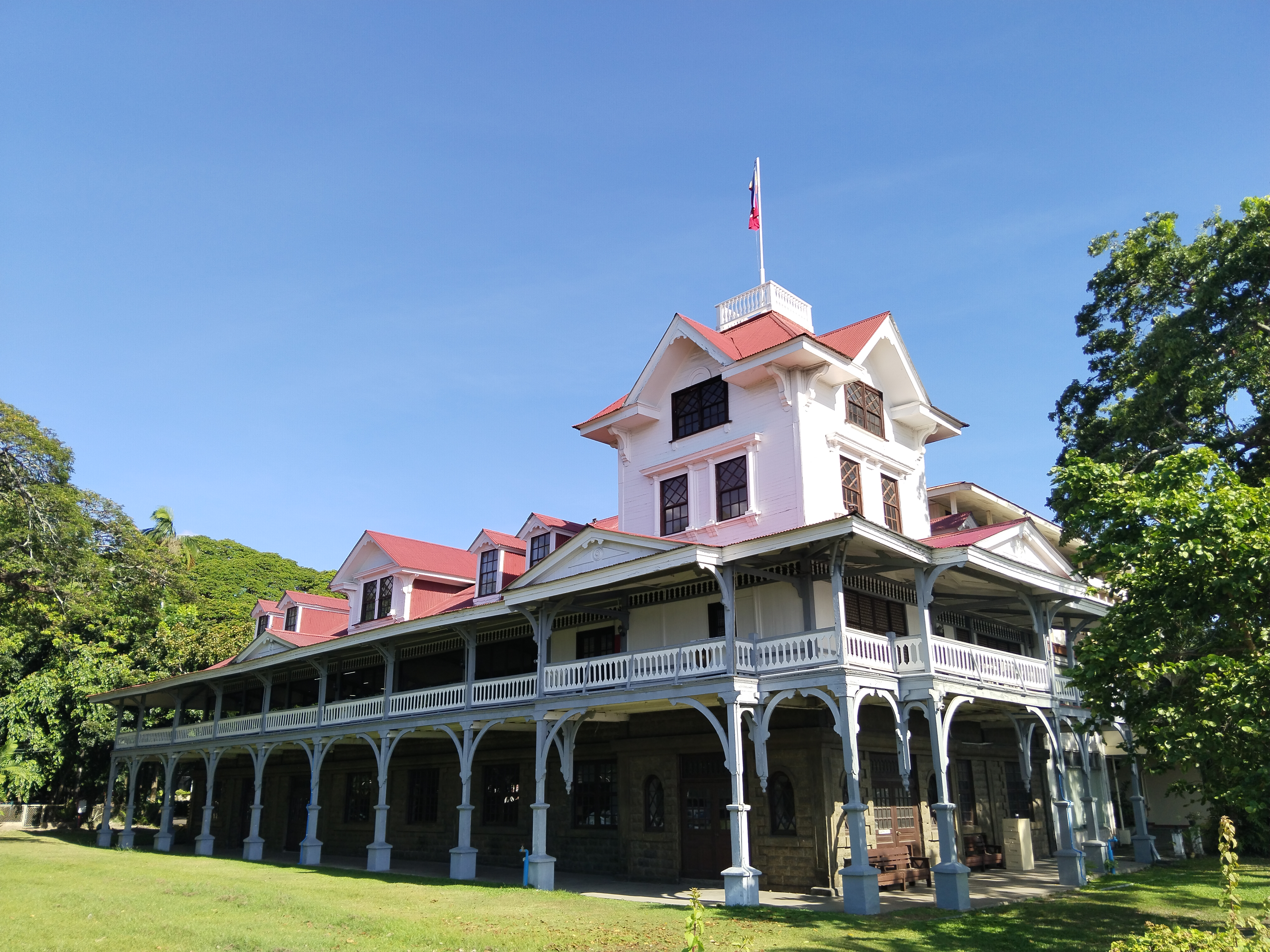
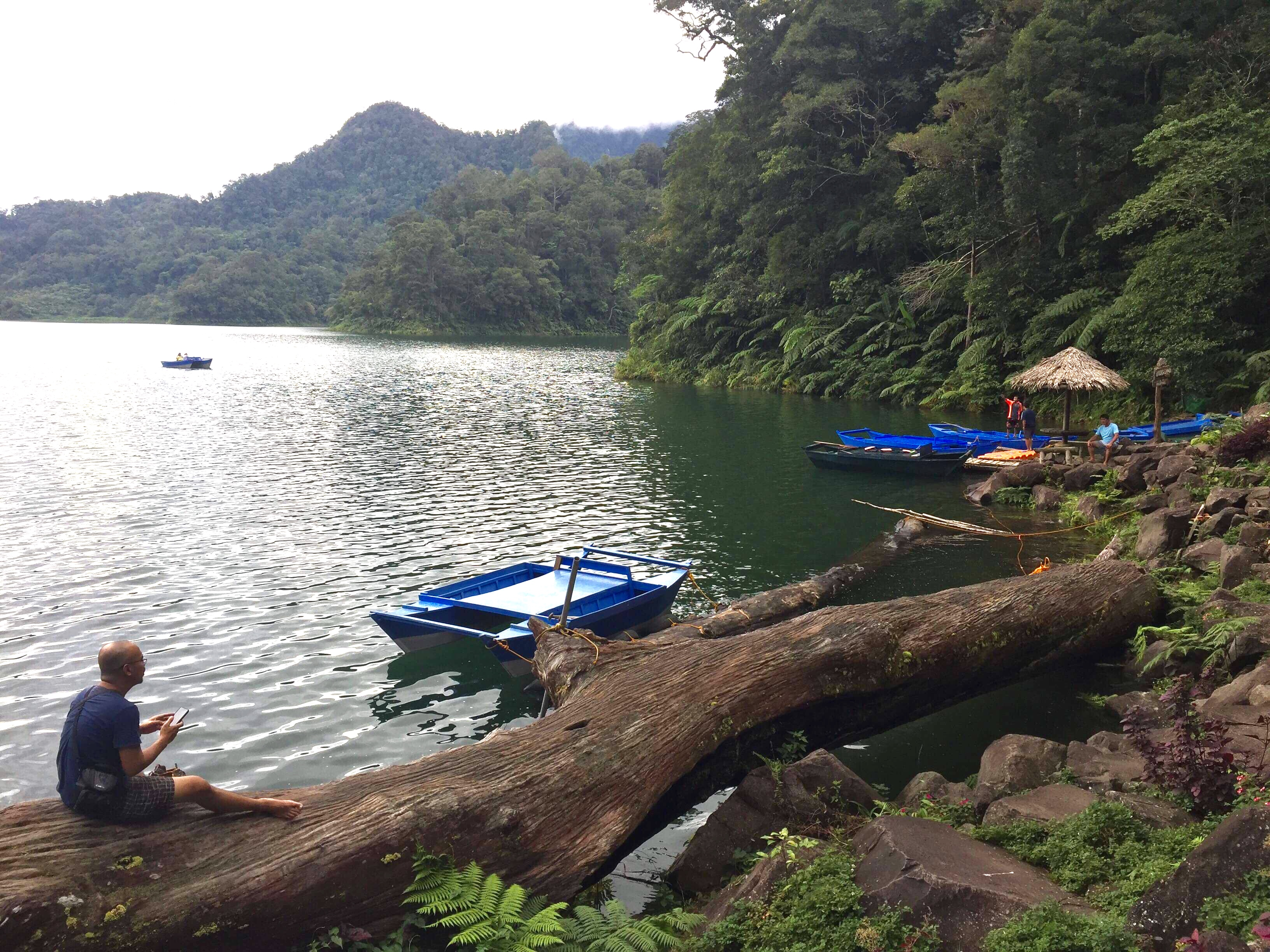
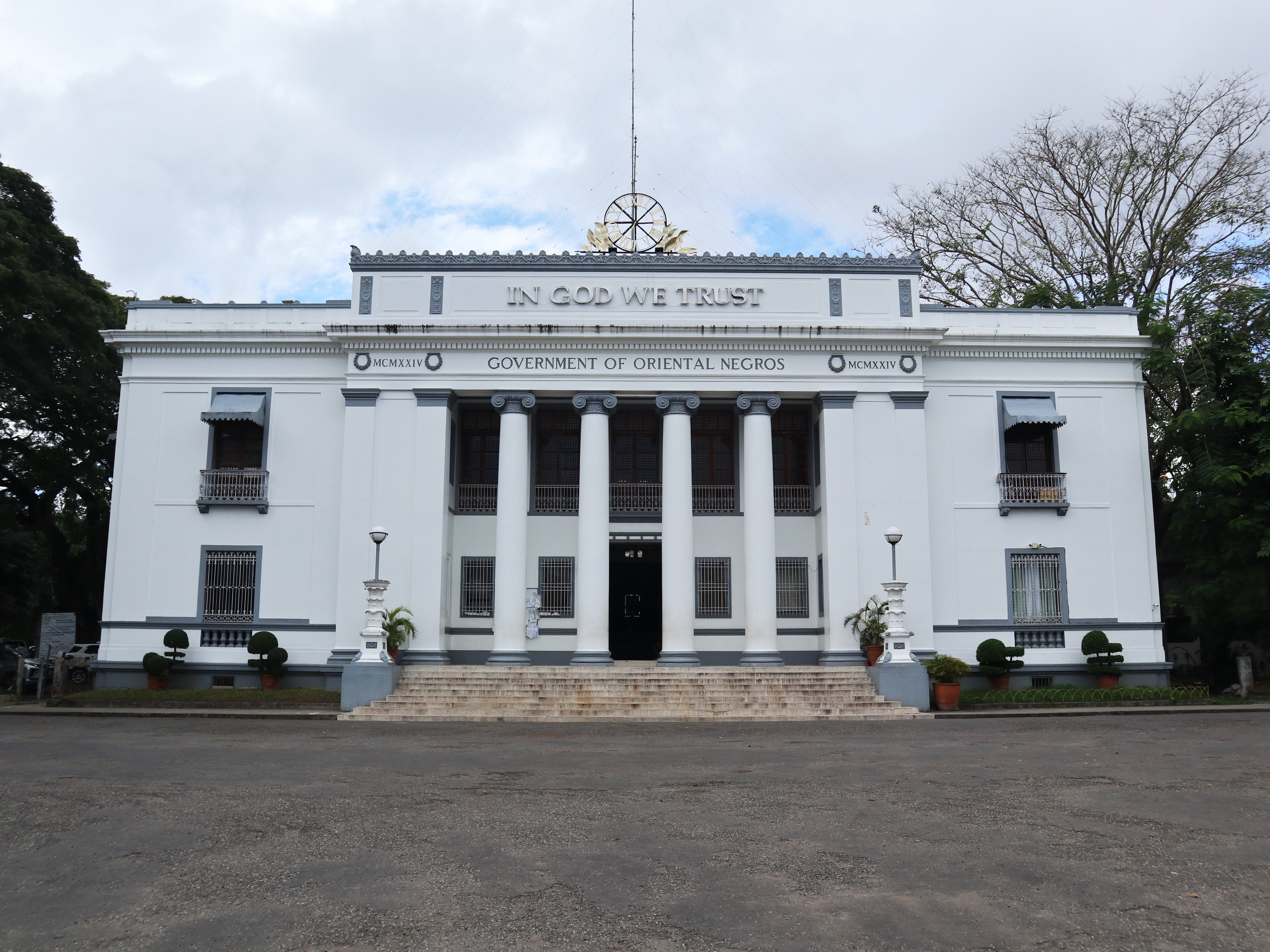
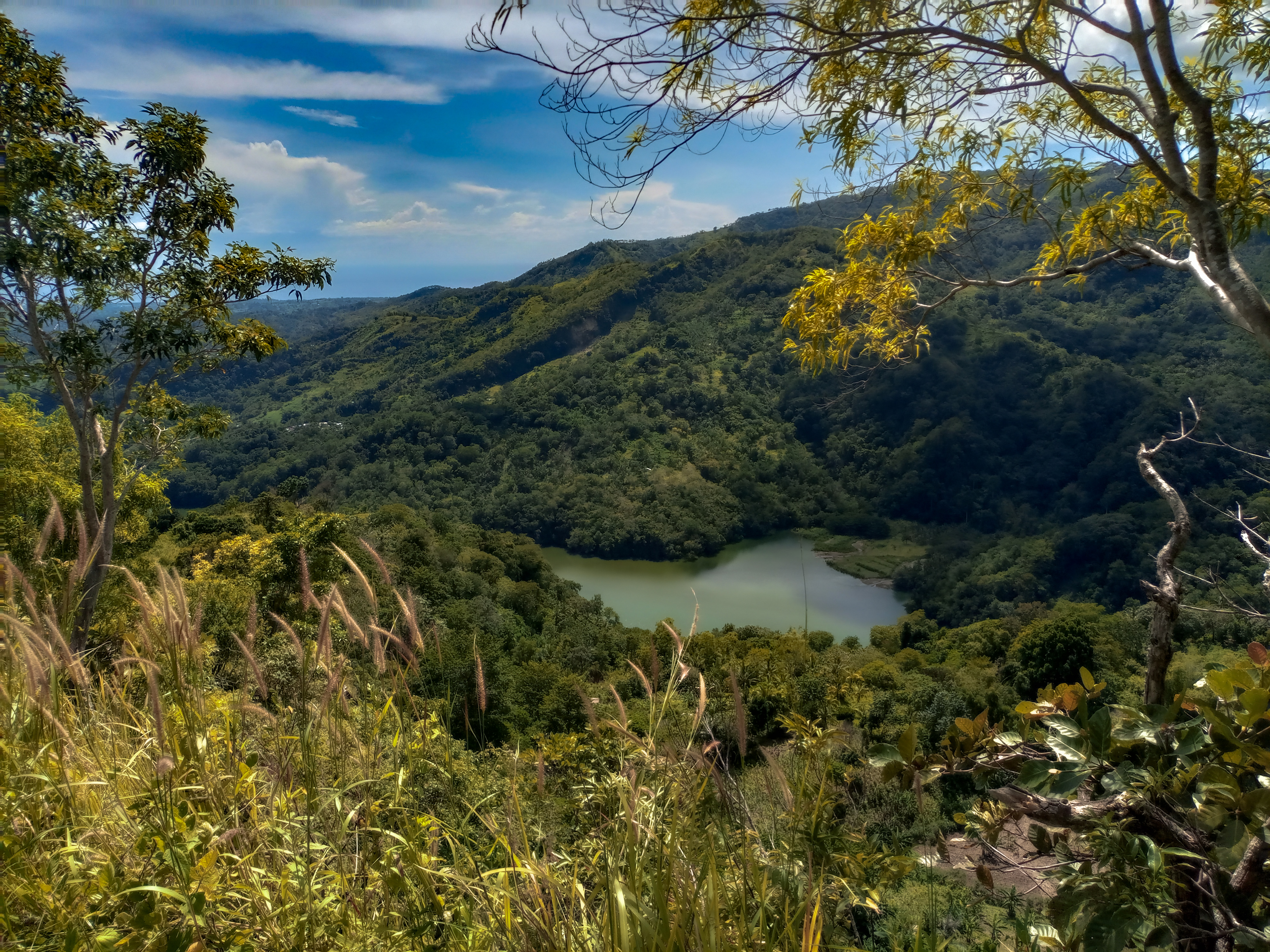
- (from top: left to right) Apo Island, Silliman University, Lake Balinsasayao, Negros Oriental Provincial Capitol in Dumaguete, and Lake Balanan

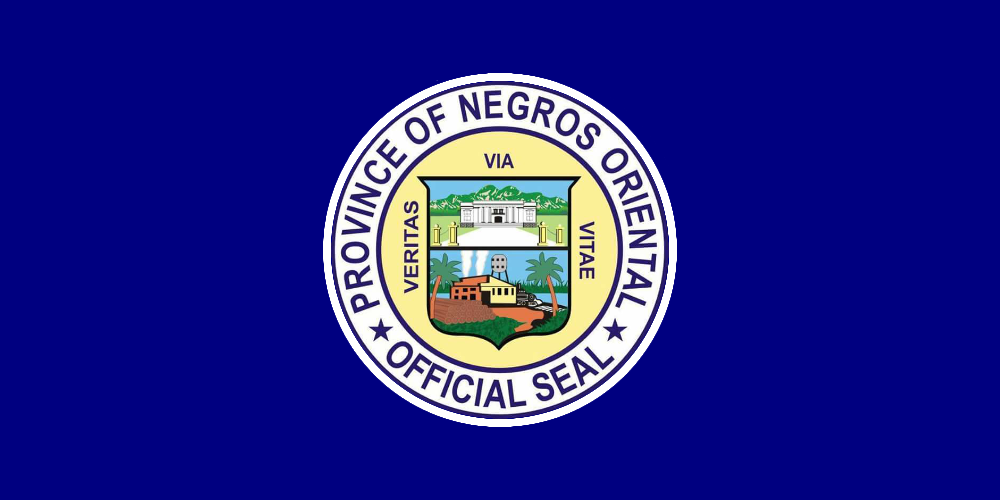
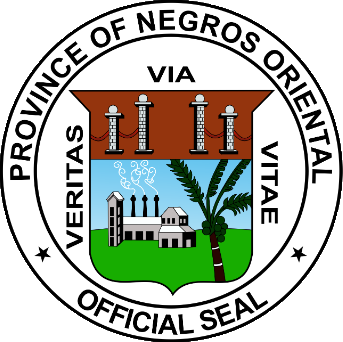
- Flag Seal
- Motto: Veritas Via Vitae (Latin) ("The Truth is the Way of Life")
- Anthem: Garbo sa Kabisay-an ("Pride of the Visayas")
- Location in the Philippines
- Interactive map of Negros Oriental
- Coordinates: 10°03′N 123°07′E
- Country: Philippines
- Region: Negros Island Region
- Founded: January 1, 1890
- Capital and largest city: Dumaguete

Government
  - Type: Sangguniang Panlalawigan
  - Governor: Manuel "Chaco" L. Sagarbarria (PFP)
  - Vice Governor: Cezanne Fritz H. Diaz (PFP)
  - Legislature: Negros Oriental Provincial Board
  - Electorate: 976,185 voters (2025)

Area
  - Total: 5,385.53 km^{2} (2,079.36 sq mi)
  - Rank: 17th out of 82
- Highest elevation (Mount Kanlaon): 2,465 m (8,087 ft)

Population (2024 census)
  - Total: 1,492,038
  - Rank: 19th out of 82
  - Density: 277.046/km^{2} (717.545/sq mi)
  - Rank: 35th out of 82
  - Households: 347,961

Divisions
  - Independent cities: 0
  - Component cities: 6: Bais; Bayawan; Canlaon; Dumaguete; Guihulngan; Tanjay
  - Municipalities: 19: Amlan; Ayungon; Bacong; Basay; Bindoy; Dauin; Jimalalud; La Libertad; Mabinay; Manjuyod; Pamplona; San Jose; Santa Catalina; Siaton; Sibulan; Tayasan; Valencia; Vallehermoso; Zamboanguita
  - Barangays: 557
  - Districts: Legislative districts of Negros Oriental

Economy
  - Income class: 1st provincial income class
  - Poverty incidence: 25.1% (2023)
  - Revenue: ₱ 3,758 million (2024)
  - Assets: ₱ 17,057 million (2024)
  - Expenditure: ₱ 1,930 million (2024)
  - Liabilities: ₱ 3,265 million (2024)
- Time zone: UTC+8 (PST)
- PSGC: 074600000
- IDD : area code: +63 (0)35
- ISO 3166 code: PH-NER
- Spoken languages: Binisaya; Hiligaynon; Tagalog; Magahat; English
- Website: www.negor.gov.ph

Negros Oriental (Eastern Negros; Cebuano: Sidlakang Negros; Tagalog: Silangang Negros), officially the Province of Negros Oriental (Cebuano: Lalawigan sa Sidlakang Negros; Tagalog: Lalawigan ng Silangang Negros), is a province in the Philippines located in the Negros Island. Its capital is the city of Dumaguete, one of the two regional centers of Negros Island Region, with the other being Bacolod. It occupies the southeastern half of the large island of Negros, and borders Negros Occidental, which comprises the northwestern half. It also includes Apo Island, a popular dive site for both local and foreign tourists.

Negros Oriental faces Cebu to the east across the Tañon Strait and Siquijor to the southeast. The primary spoken language is Binisaya, and the predominant religious denomination is Roman Catholicism. Dumaguete is the capital, seat of government, and most populous city of the province. According to the 2020 census, it had a population of 1,432,990 people, making it the second most-populous province in the region after Negros Occidental, the fifth most-populous province in the Visayas, and the 19th most-populous province of the Philippines.

== History ==
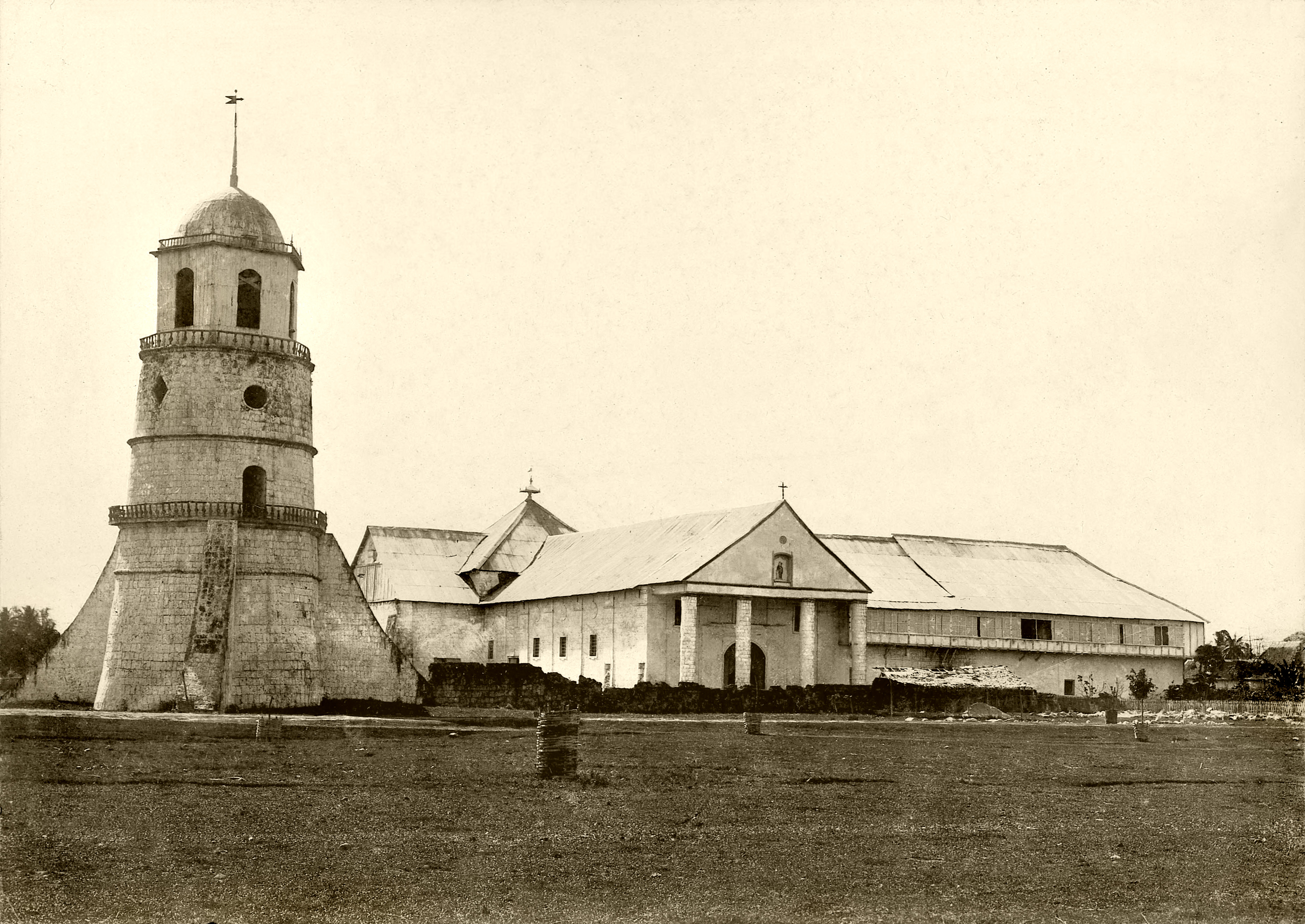
The Dumaguete Church in circa 1891 with its belfry to warn townsfolk of attacks by marauding pirates.

=== Early history ===
Negros, the largest island in the Visayas, is believed to have once been part of a larger landmass that was cut off by rising waters at the end of the last ice age. Among the early inhabitants of the island were the Negritos and the Austronesians, and later the Han Chinese, who are mainly merchants. They called the island "Buglas", a native word which is believed to mean "cut off".

=== Spanish colonial era ===
Spanish explorers on the expedition of Miguel Lopez de Legazpi first came to the island in April 1565. Legazpi dropped anchor in Bohol and sent his men to scout the island. Because of the strong currents of the Tañon Strait between Cebu and Negros, they were carried for several days and forced to land on the western side of the island. They reported seeing many dark-skinned inhabitants, and they called the island "Negros" (Negro means "black" in Spanish). The island was sparsely settled at the time, except for a few coastal settlements including Ilog and Binalbagan. In 1571, Legaspi assigned encomiendas on the island to 13 of his men. Augustinian friars began the Christianization of the island the next year. The island was administered as part of the jurisdiction of Oton until 1734 when it became a military district, and Ilog became the capital of the island. By 1818, Negros Oriental had large numbers of Spanish-Filipino families settling in it. With Amlan having 155 Spanish-Filipino families and Dumaguete having 25 Spanish-Filipino families. The capital was transferred to Himamaylan in 1795. Negros became a politico-military province in 1865 and the capital was transferred to Bacolod.

Due to its proximity to Mindanao, the southeastern coasts of Negros were in constant threat from Moro marauders looking for slaves, so watchtowers were built to protect the Christian villages. The Moro raids and Negros Oriental's distance from the Negrense capital of Bacolod, induced 13 Recollectionist priests to petition for the division of the island in July 1876. The island of Negros was then divided into the provinces of Negros Oriental and Negros Occidental by a royal decree executed by Governor General Valeriano Weyler on January 1, 1890. Dumaguete was made the first and only capital of Negros Oriental. In 1892, Siquijor became a part of Negros Oriental, having previously been administered by Spain under the politico-military province of Bohol.

The Philippine Revolution reached Negros in 1898, disrupting government functions but without extreme violence and bloodshed. Revolutionary troops in the island were composed mostly of farm labourers and other prominent people of the province of Negros Oriental, who were organized and led by Don Diego de la Viña. The Spanish colonial government in Dumaguete and the rest of the island was overthrown on November 24, 1898. Later, the Negros Occidental area under the leadership of Gen. Araneta, along with the Negros Oriental area under the leadership of Don Diego de la Viña, merged to form the Cantonal Republic of Negros, a separate government from the more familiar Malolos Republic established in Luzon.

=== American occupation era ===
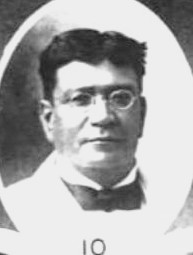
Demetrio Larena the first Governor of Negros Oriental.

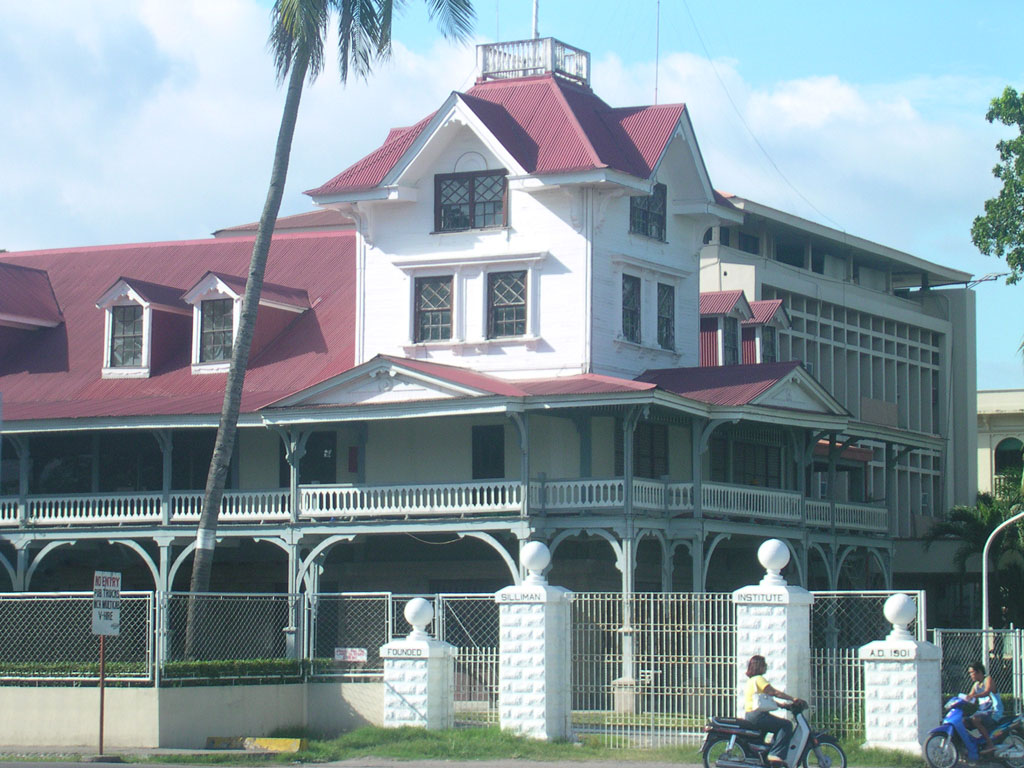
Silliman University

In 1901, the Negros Oriental province was reorganized by the United States and a civil government was established, with Demetrio Larena as governor. The American government made Siquijor a "sub-province" of Negros Oriental. Negros Oriental became a province under the American civil government on March 10, 1917, through Act 2711. In 1934, Negros Oriental became a corregimiento, a separate military district. Under the American colonial government, transportation infrastructure was developed with improvements of roads and new bridges.

=== Japanese occupation era ===
During World War II, both Negros provinces were invaded by Imperial Japanese forces, causing many residents to flee to the inland mountains. Negros Island was liberated by combined Philippine and American troops with the local Negrense guerillas attacking the Japanese on August 6, 1945. The 7th, 73rd, 74th, and 75th Infantry Divisions of the Philippine Commonwealth Army were established from January 3, 1942, to June 30, 1946, and the 7th Constabulary Regiment of the Philippine Constabulary was active from October 28, 1944, to June 30, 1946, at the Military General Headquarters in Negros Oriental. They started the engagements of the Anti-Japanese Imperial Military Operations in Negros from 1942 to 1945 against the Japanese Imperial forces.

=== Creation of Siquijor ===
On September 17, 1971, Siquijor became an independent province by virtue of Republic Act No. 6396.

=== Martial law era ===
The beginning months of the 1970s had marked a period of turmoil and change in the Philippines, as well as in Negros Oriental. During his bid to be the first Philippine president to be re-elected for a second term, Ferdinand Marcos launched an unprecedented number of foreign debt-funded public works projects. This caused the Philippine economy to take a sudden downwards turn known as the 1969 Philippine balance of payments crisis, which led to a period of economic difficulty and a significant rise of social unrest. With only a year left in his last constitutionally allowed term as president, Ferdinand Marcos placed the Philippines under Martial Law in September 1972 and thus retained the position for fourteen more years. This period in Philippine history is remembered for the Marcos administration's record of human rights abuses, particularly targeting political opponents, student activists, journalists, religious workers, farmers, and others who fought against the Marcos dictatorship.

Dumaguete was one of the first cities in the country to learn about Marcos' declaration of martial law on September 23, 1972. Local news station DYSR was able to pick up the news from an Australian broadcast. Elsewhere in the country, media outlets such as newspapers and broadcast stations had already been shut down, but DSYR was able to make the announcement before Information Secretary Francisco Tatad did at around noon. DYSR itself would be shut down later that day. Silliman University was one of the last four universities in the Philippines to be allowed to reopen for classes, with Marcos himself complaining about instances where members of the political opposition such as Senators Jovito Salonga and Juan Liwag were invited to speak at the university.

In the mid-1980s, the crony capitalism which characterized the Marcos administration had a major effect on the island of Negros in which Dumaguete is located. A sugar hoarding scheme by National Sugar Trading Corporation (NASUTRA) of Roberto Benedicto backfired, resulting in the mass-firing of sugar workers in Negros Oriental and Negros Occidental. Worsened by the economic nosedive which had begun in 1983, it eventually became known as the 1985 Negros famine.

=== Contemporary ===
The municipality of Guihulngan became a component city by virtue of Republic Act No. 9409 which sought to convert the municipality into a city. The law was ratified on June 14, 2007. However, the cityhood status was lost twice in the years 2008 and 2010 after the LCP questioned the validity of the cityhood law. The cityhood status was reaffirmed after the court finalized its ruling on February 15, 2011 which declared the cityhood law constitutional.

On May 29, 2015, the Negros Island Region was formed when President Benigno Aquino III signed Executive Order No. 183, s. 2015. Negros Oriental was separated from the Central Visayas region and transferred to the new region along with Negros Occidental and Bacolod. However, on August 9, 2017, President Rodrigo Duterte dissolved the Negros Island Region, revoking Executive Order No. 183, s. 2015 through the signing of Executive Order No. 38, citing a lack of funds to fully establish the region according to Benjamin Diokno, the Secretary of Budget and Management. This returned Negros Oriental to the Central Visayas region.

In 2018, with the Duterte administration promoting federalism, the idea of Negros Oriental and Negros Occidental reunified into one federal region was discussed with local provincial politicians, with some additional support from the known native Negrenses. There is also a suggestion, jointly approved by the provincial governors, that Negros Oriental along with Negros Occidental, be renamed with their pre-colonial names as "Buglas Sidlakan" and "Buglas Nakatundan" respectively, with Negros, as a federal state, be named as "Negrosanon Federated Region", due to the negative racial connotation associated with the name "Negros".

On June 13, 2024, Negros Oriental was transferred from Central Visayas to the Negros Island Region after President Bongbong Marcos signed Republic Act 12000.

==== Centennial anniversary of the Negros Oriental Capitol building ====
On May 17, 2024, the 1924 Grecian-Ionic Daniel Burnham "Negros Oriental Capitol" building's historical marker for the centennial anniversary-"Jubilee Year" commemoration was installed by the National Historical Commission of the Philippines' Directress Carminda Arevalo. Governor Manuel "Chaco" L. Sagarbarria signed the marker's Certificate of Transfer in the presence of Imee Marcos, Francis Tolentino, Mark Villar, Risa Hontiveros, Lito Lapid, Jinggoy Estrada, Irish Ambassador William John Carlos and Philippine Tour Operators Association who graced the historic event along Dumaguete North Road, Dumaguete City. Kuh Ledesma, Silliman University Dance Troupe and Orchestra Sin Arco performed with others followed by the finale, Pyro Musical Competition at the Freedom Park.

== Geography ==
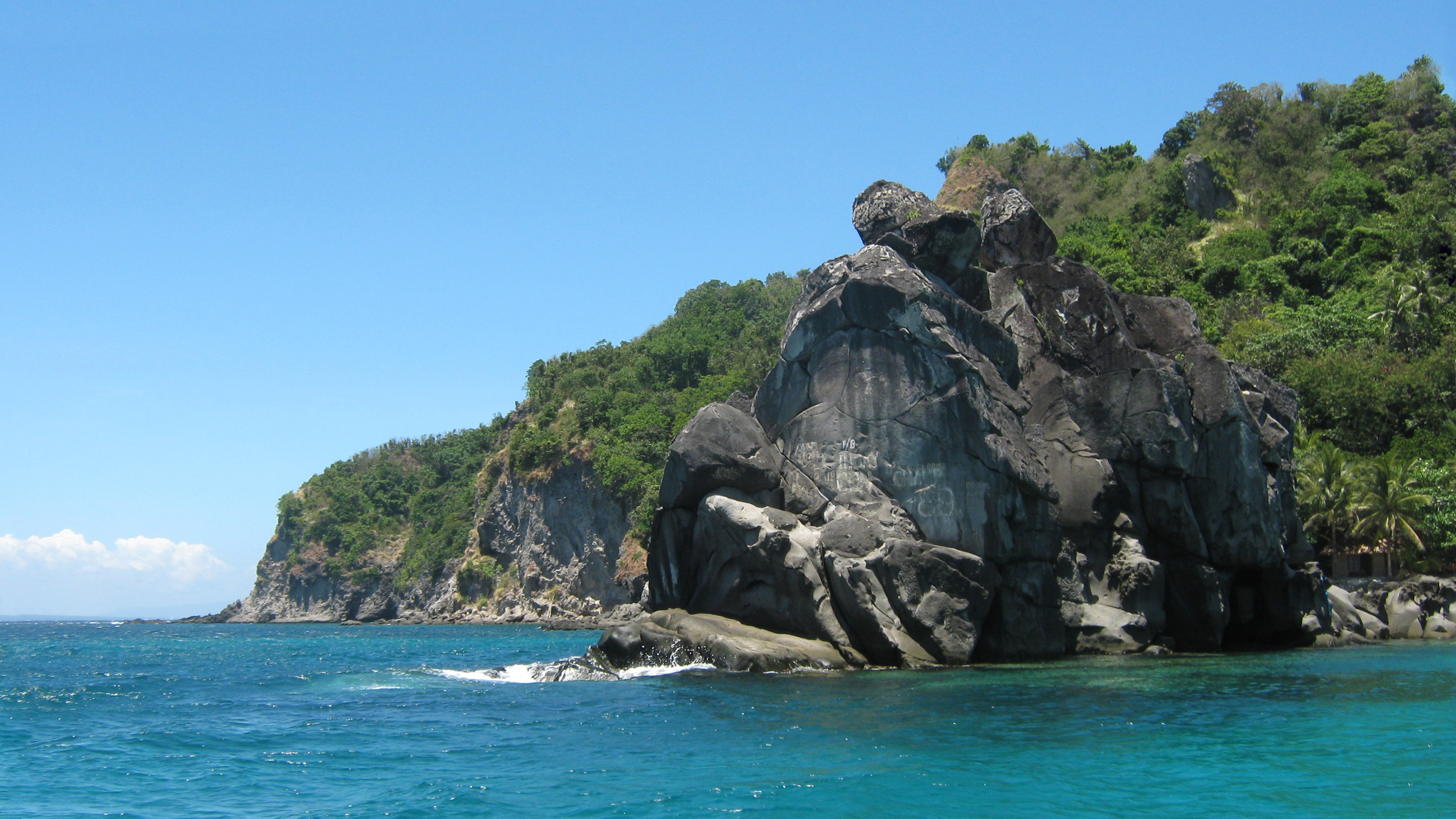
Rock formations at Apo Island

Negros Oriental occupies the southeastern half of the island of Negros, with Negros Occidental comprising the northwestern half. It has a total land area of 5,385.53 km^{2} (2,079.36 mi^{2}). A chain of rugged mountains separates Negros Oriental from Negros Occidental. Negros Oriental faces Cebu to the east across the Tañon Strait and Siquijor to the southeast. The Sulu Sea borders it to the south to southwest. Negros is primarily volcanic, making its soil ideal for agriculture. Eighty percent of all arable land in the island region is cultivated.

=== Topography ===
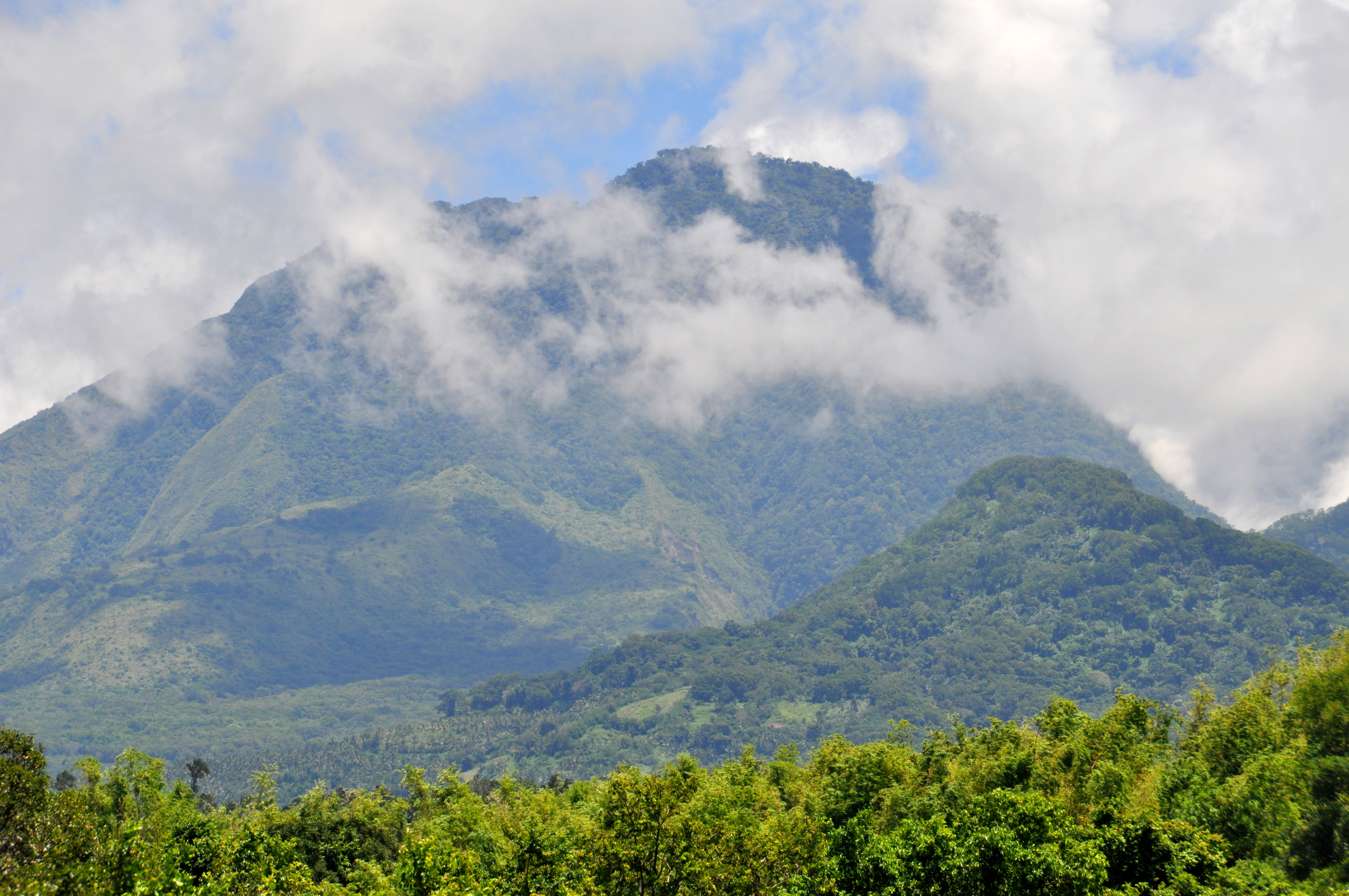
Mount Talinis, located southwest of Valencia, is the second highest volcanic mountain in Negros

The province's topography is characterized by low, grooved mountain ranges, some of which lie close to the shoreline. At the southern end of the province is Mount Talinis, also known as Cuernos de Negros ("Horns of Negros"), which is a dormant complex volcano which rises to a height of 2,000 metres (6,600 ft). At the northern end of the province is the active Kanlaon Volcano, the highest peak of the island region with a height of 2,465 metres (8,087 ft). There are a few flatlands and plateaus in the interior to the southwest of the province, which includes the Tablas Plateau.

One of the landmarks of Dumaguete is the Dumaguete Bell Tower which stands next to the Saint Catherine of Alexandria Cathedral. It was once used to warn the city of impending pirate attacks.

=== Climate ===
Negros Oriental has a tropical climate. Because of the mountain range running from the north to the south, the province has two types of climatic conditions. The eastern part of the province is characterized as having a modestly distinct wet season, and a short dry season lasting from one to three months. The western half of the province is characterized by a distinct wet season and dry season.

== Administrative divisions ==
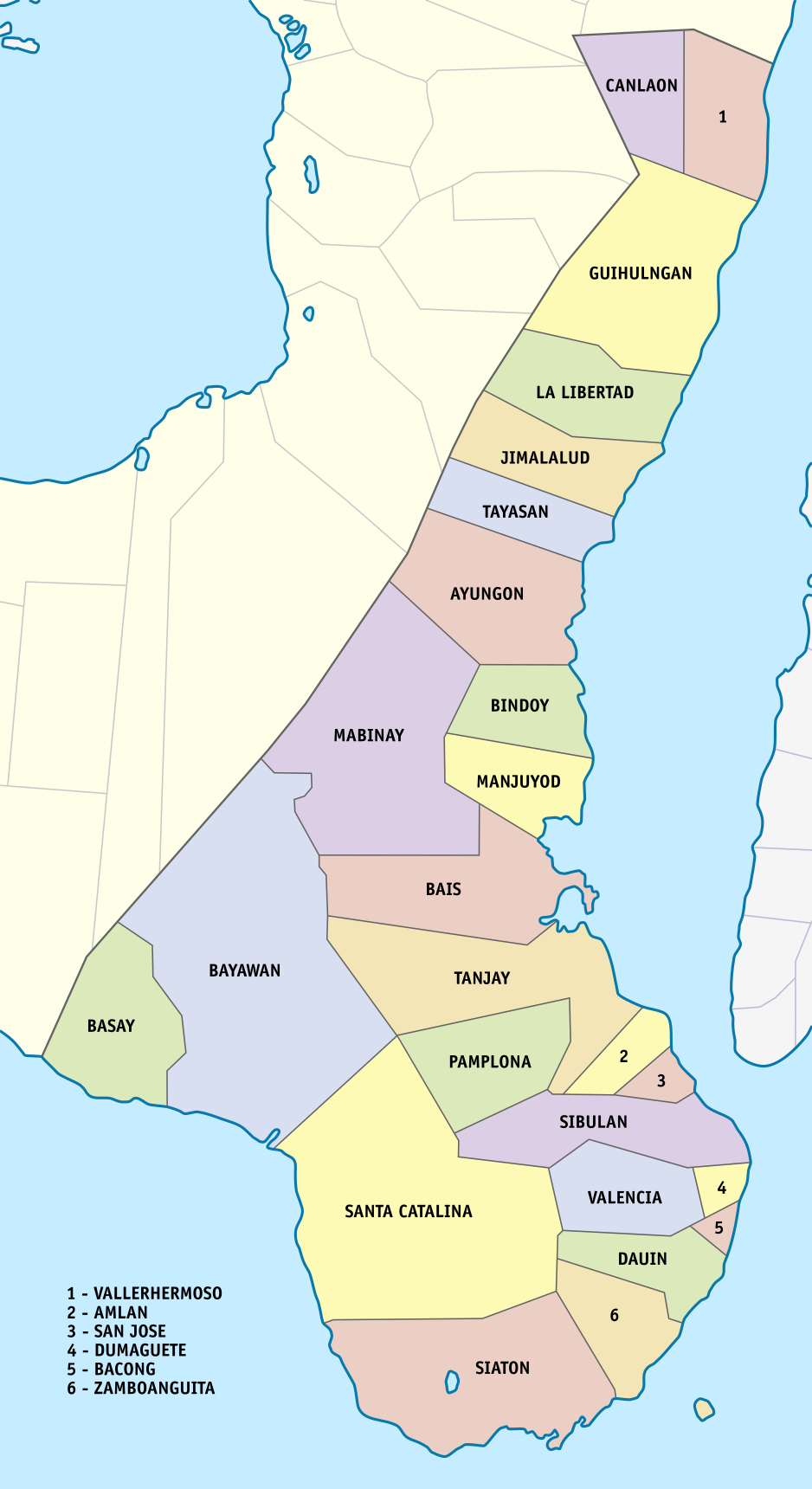
Political divisions of Negros Oriental

Negros Oriental comprises 19 municipalities and 6 cities, further subdivided into 557 barangays.

Dumaguete is the provincial capital and seat of government. It is also the province's most populous city, despite having the smallest land area among all component cities and municipalities of Negros Oriental.

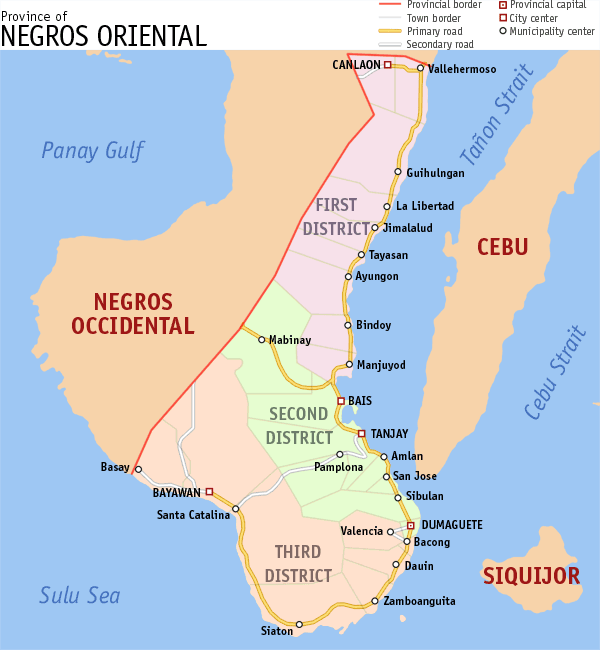
Legislative map of Negros Oriental

For purposes of legislative representation, the cities and municipalities are grouped into three congressional districts, with each district electing a congressman to the House of Representatives of the Philippines.

- † Provincial capital and component city
- ∗ Component city
- Municipality

City or municipality^{[A]}		District	Population			±% p.a.	Area		Density		Barangay	Coordinates^{[B]}
			(2020)		(2015)		km^{2}	sq mi	/km^{2}	/sq mi		
Amlan		2nd	1.8%	25,513	23,624	+1.48%	111.85	43.19	230	600	8	9°27′49″N 123°13′36″E
Ayungon		1st	3.3%	47,102	46,303	+0.33%	265.10	102.36	180	470	24	9°51′31″N 123°08′37″E
Bacong		3rd	2.9%	41,207	36,527	+2.32%	40.30	15.56	1,000	2,600	22	9°14′43″N 123°17′42″E
Bais	∗	2nd	5.9%	84,317	76,291	+1.92%	319.64	123.41	260	670	35	9°35′29″N 123°07′17″E
Basay		3rd	2.0%	28,531	26,566	+1.37%	162.00	62.55	180	470	10	9°24′36″N 122°38′27″E
Bayawan	∗	3rd	8.6%	122,747	117,900	+0.77%	699.08	269.92	180	470	28	9°22′00″N 122°48′20″E
Bindoy		2nd	2.8%	40,308	39,819	+0.23%	173.70	67.07	230	600	22	9°45′21″N 123°08′27″E
Canlaon	∗	1st	4.1%	58,822	54,509	+1.46%	170.93	66.00	340	880	12	10°23′11″N 123°13′28″E
Dauin		3rd	2.1%	30,018	27,786	+1.48%	114.10	44.05	260	670	23	9°11′28″N 123°15′56″E
Dumaguete	†	2nd	9.4%	134,103	131,377	+0.39%	33.62	12.98	4,000	10,000	30	9°18′19″N 123°18′29″E
Guihulngan	∗	1st	7.2%	102,656	95,969	+1.29%	388.56	150.02	260	670	33	10°07′12″N 123°16′22″E
Jimalalud		1st	2.3%	32,256	30,945	+0.79%	139.50	53.86	230	600	28	9°58′45″N 123°12′01″E
La Libertad		1st	2.9%	41,089	38,602	+1.20%	174.64	67.43	240	620	29	10°01′35″N 123°14′02″E
Mabinay		2nd	5.8%	82,953	78,864	+0.97%	319.44	123.34	260	670	32	9°43′35″N 122°55′46″E
Manjuyod		1st	3.1%	44,799	42,332	+1.08%	264.60	102.16	170	440	27	9°40′46″N 123°08′57″E
Pamplona		2nd	2.8%	39,805	37,596	+1.09%	202.20	78.07	200	520	16	9°28′20″N 123°07′06″E
San Jose		2nd	1.5%	21,956	20,413	+1.40%	54.46	21.03	400	1,000	14	9°24′50″N 123°14′30″E
Santa Catalina		3rd	5.4%	77,501	75,756	+0.43%	523.10	201.97	150	390	22	9°19′59″N 122°51′47″E
Siaton		3rd	5.8%	83,082	77,696	+1.28%	335.90	129.69	250	650	26	9°03′51″N 123°01′56″E
Sibulan		2nd	4.5%	64,343	59,455	+1.52%	163.00	62.93	390	1,000	15	9°21′32″N 123°17′05″E
Tanjay	∗	2nd	5.8%	82,642	80,532	+0.49%	276.05	106.58	300	780	24	9°30′58″N 123°09′26″E
Tayasan		1st	2.7%	38,159	35,470	+1.40%	154.20	59.54	250	650	28	9°55′23″N 123°10′20″E
Valencia		3rd	2.7%	38,733	34,852	+2.03%	147.49	56.95	260	670	24	9°16′54″N 123°14′41″E
Vallehermoso		1st	2.8%	40,779	38,259	+1.22%	101.25	39.09	400	1,000	15	10°20′05″N 123°19′34″E
Zamboanguita		3rd	2.1%	29,569	27,552	+1.35%	85.86	33.15	340	880	10	9°06′07″N 123°11′55″E
Total				1,432,990	1,354,995	+1.07%	5,420.57	2,092.89	260	670	557	(see GeoGroup box)
1. Coordinates mark the city/town center, and are sortable by latitude.

== Demographics ==
Population census of Negros Oriental

Year	Pop.	±% p.a.
1903	151,338	—
1918	215,750	+2.39%
1939	335,173	+2.12%
1948	386,203	+1.59%
1960	538,206	+2.80%
1970	652,264	+1.94%

Year	Pop.	±% p.a.
1975	740,417	+2.57%
1980	819,399	+2.05%
1990	925,272	+1.22%
1995	1,025,247	+1.94%
2000	1,130,088	+2.11%
2007	1,231,904	+1.20%

Year	Pop.	±% p.a.
2010	1,286,666	+1.60%
2015	1,354,995	+0.99%
2020	1,432,990	+1.18%
2024	1,492,038	+0.97%

Source: Philippine Statistics Authority

Languages spoken (2000)
Language	Speakers
Cebuano	1,427,065
Hiligaynon	165,308
Other Visayan languages	39,174
Boholano	4,147
Others	8,318
Not Reported	8,065

The population of Negros Oriental in the 2020 census was 1,432,990 people, with a density of 250/km^{2} (650/sq mi). In 2010, its registered voting population was 606,634. 34.5% of the population are concentrated in the six most populous component cities of Dumaguete, Bayawan, Guihulngan, Tanjay, Bais and Canlaon. Population growth per year is about 0.99% between 2010 and 2015, lower than the national average of 1.72%.

Residents of the whole Negros island are generally called "Negrenses" (and less often "Negrosanons") while residents of Negros Oriental sometimes refer to themselves specifically as "NegOrenses" to distinguish themselves from residents of Negros Occidental. Many NegOrenses are of either pure/mixed Austronesian heritage, with foreign ancestry (i.e. Chinese and/or Spanish) as minorities.

=== Languages ===
Negros Oriental is predominantly a Cebuano-speaking province due to its close proximity to Cebu, with 72% of residents reporting it as a first language. Hiligaynon is spoken by the remaining 28% and is common in areas close to the border with Negros Occidental. Filipino and English, while seldom used as first languages, are generally understood and used for official, literary, and educational purposes. The indigenous Minagahat and Karul-an languages are spoken by the indigenous highlander peoples of Negros. The province is also said to be home of the last living remnants of the Inatá language speakers.

=== Religion ===
Christianity is the predominant religion in the province with Roman Catholicism (75%) as the largest single denomination. However, there is a strong and growing presence of mainline and evangelical Protestant which forms about 9% of the province population. The Iglesia ni Cristo forms 3–5% of the total population, the Seventh-day Adventists, Jehovah's Witnesses and the Aglipayan Church, also known as the Philippine Independent Church, also have some presence. Adherents of Islam and Buddhism constitute a minority of the population. Some Muslim places of worship are the Imam Khomeini Islamic Center and the Bagacay Mosque, which is officially known as Masjidus Salam.

== Economy ==
Poverty incidence of Negros Oriental (%)

Source: Philippine Statistics Authority

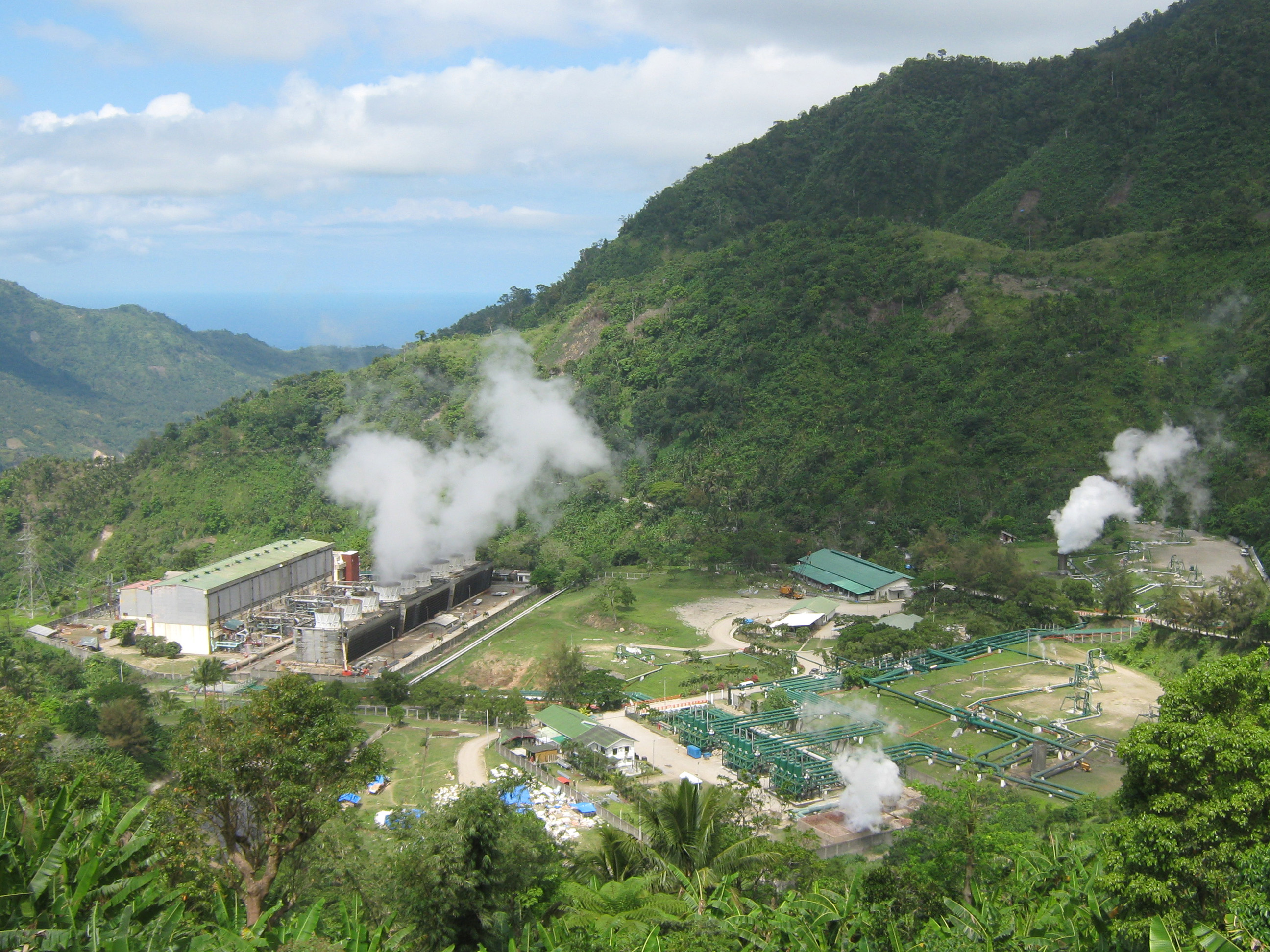
A geothermal power station in Valencia

With its vast fertile land resources, Negros Oriental's other major industry is agriculture. The primary crops are sugarcane, sweetcorn, coconut and rice. In the coastal areas, fishing is the main source of income. People are also involved in cattle ranches, fish ponds and rubber plantations, especially in Bayawan. There are also mineral deposits like gold, silver, and copper found throughout the inner areas of the province.

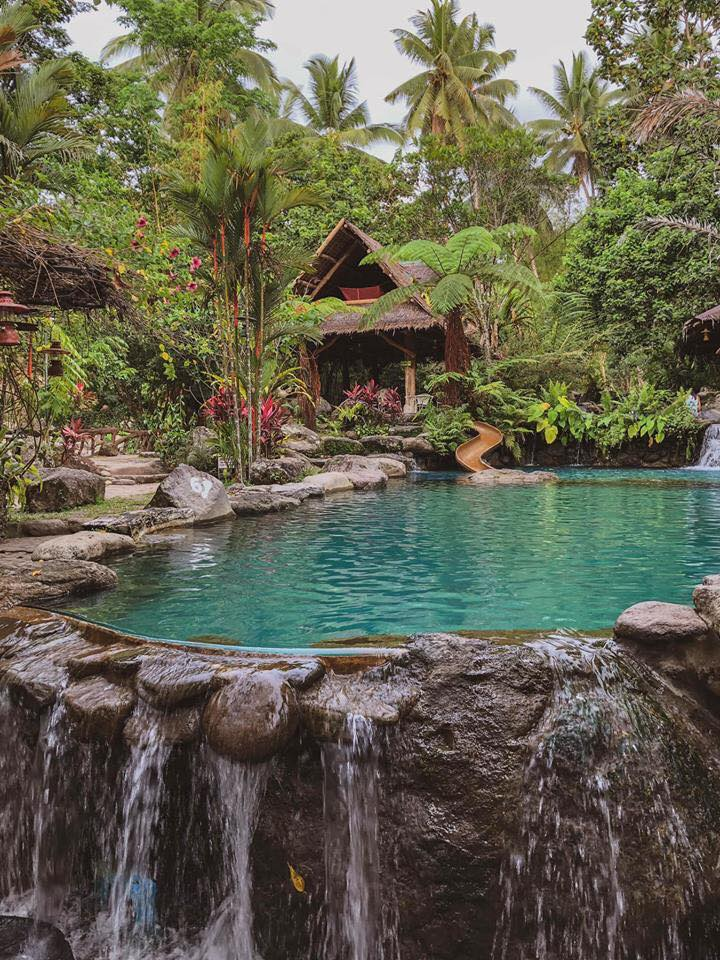
The Forest Camp Resort in Valencia

The province is already emerging as a major technological center in Visayas, with its growing business process outsourcing (BPO) that has started to penetrate the province's secondary cities and other technology-related industries. Vehicle assembly is a growing industry in Amlan. Construction of mass housing and subdivisions is very evident in the periphery of Dumaguete and is expected to spill over into the province's secondary cities and fast-growing towns.

Other industries include water bottling and warehousing, as well as cold and dry storing. Retailing has penetrated other urban areas outside Dumaguete, with the entry of supermarkets and shopping malls in cities such as Bayawan, Tanjay, and Bais. The town of Bacong, which borders Dumaguete in the south, hosts many industrial plants geared for the local and export markets, which can bolster economic growth. Negros Oriental is also a notable tourist destination in the Visayas.

== Transportation ==
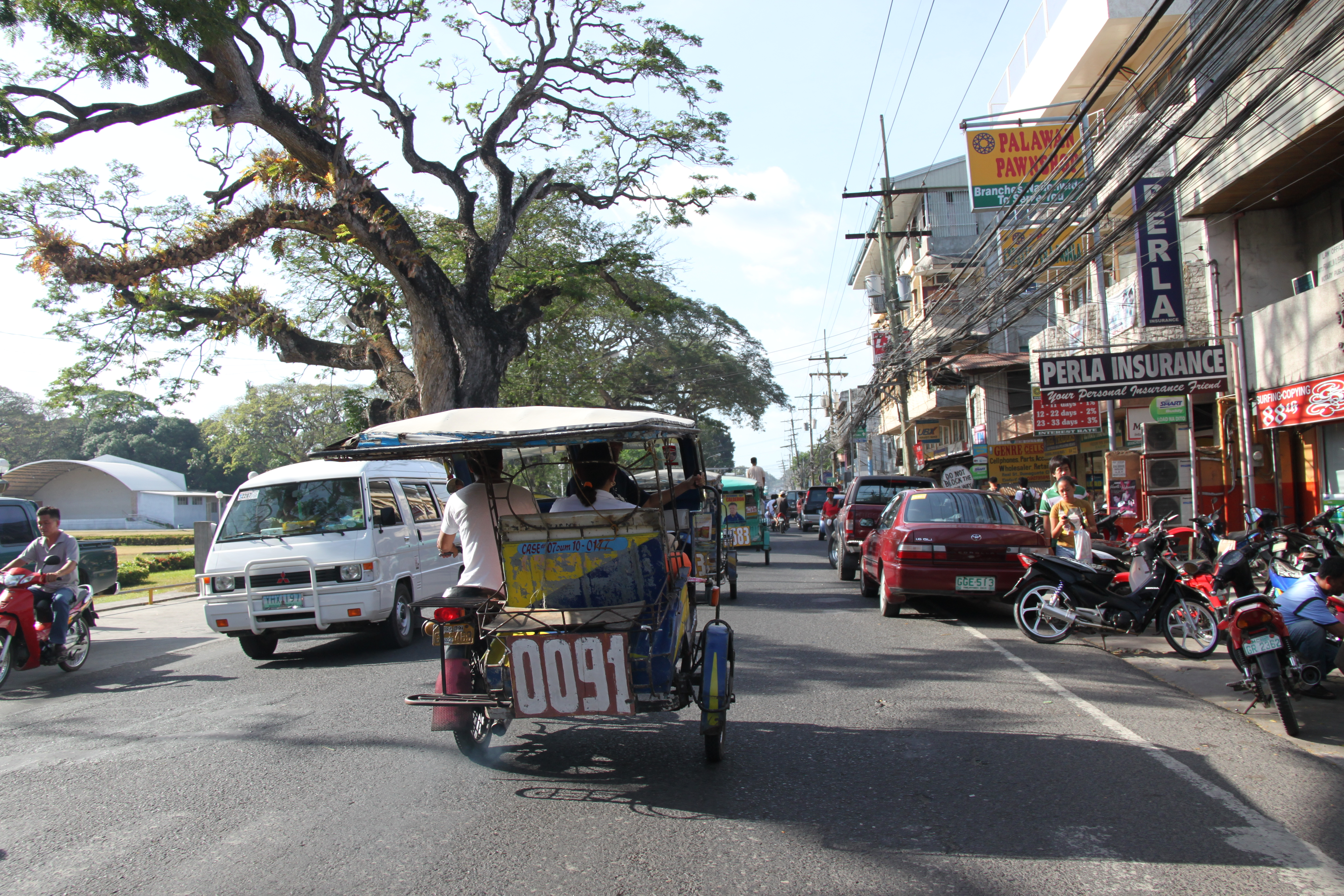
A motorized tricycle in Dumaguete

Negros Oriental has a network of roads, including a national road that spans the circumference of Negros Island. National and provincial roads in the province total more than 900 kilometers, though only about half of these are paved.

Many residents do not own private vehicles and rely solely on public transport. Buses and jeepneys link the cities and municipalities of the province. For short distances within a town, motorized tricycles ("tricycles" for short) are available. Moreover, motorcycle taxis, known locally as habal-habal, are the primary mode of transportation in places that cannot be reached with other types of vehicles.

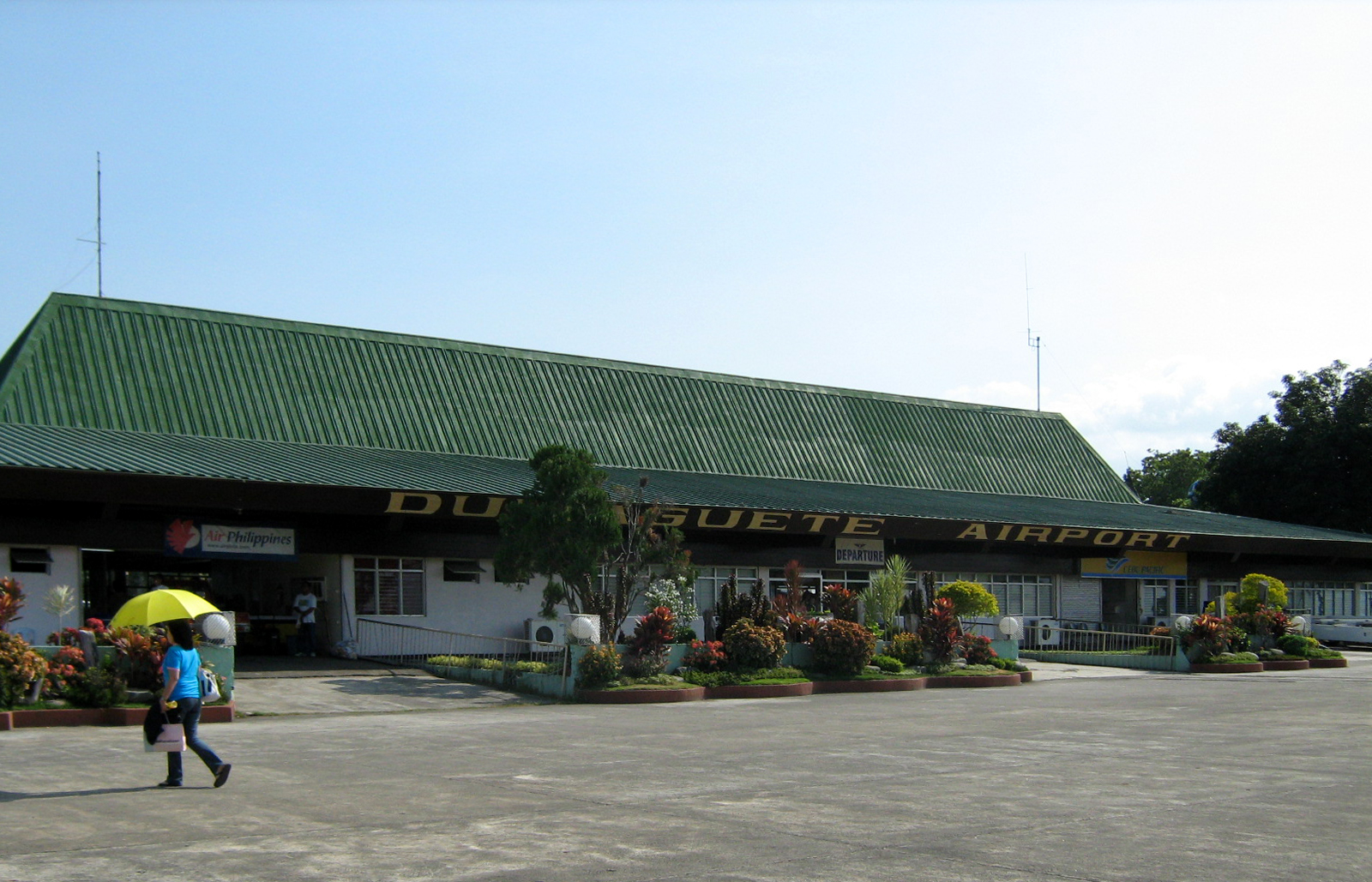
Sibulan Airport terminal in 2007

Sibulan Airport, located in Sibulan, is the province's only commercial airport. It is a domestic airport with multiple daily flights to and from Manila, served by Philippine Airlines and Cebu Pacific. The airport also serves flights to and from Cebu and Cagayan de Oro. Based on 2002 statistics, an average of 5,800 outgoing passengers and 5,700 incoming passengers pass through the airport every month. In March 2021, upgrade works were made to the current Sibulan Airport which included pavement reconstruction, expansion of the terminal building, and expansion of CAAP administrative buildings. The airport is due for transfer to Bacong because of congestion in its current location and has been proposed since 2014 and is still pending final approval as of 2022.

The primary seaport of the province is the Port of Dumaguete. Additionally, there are five other seaports in the province classified as tertiary.

== Education ==
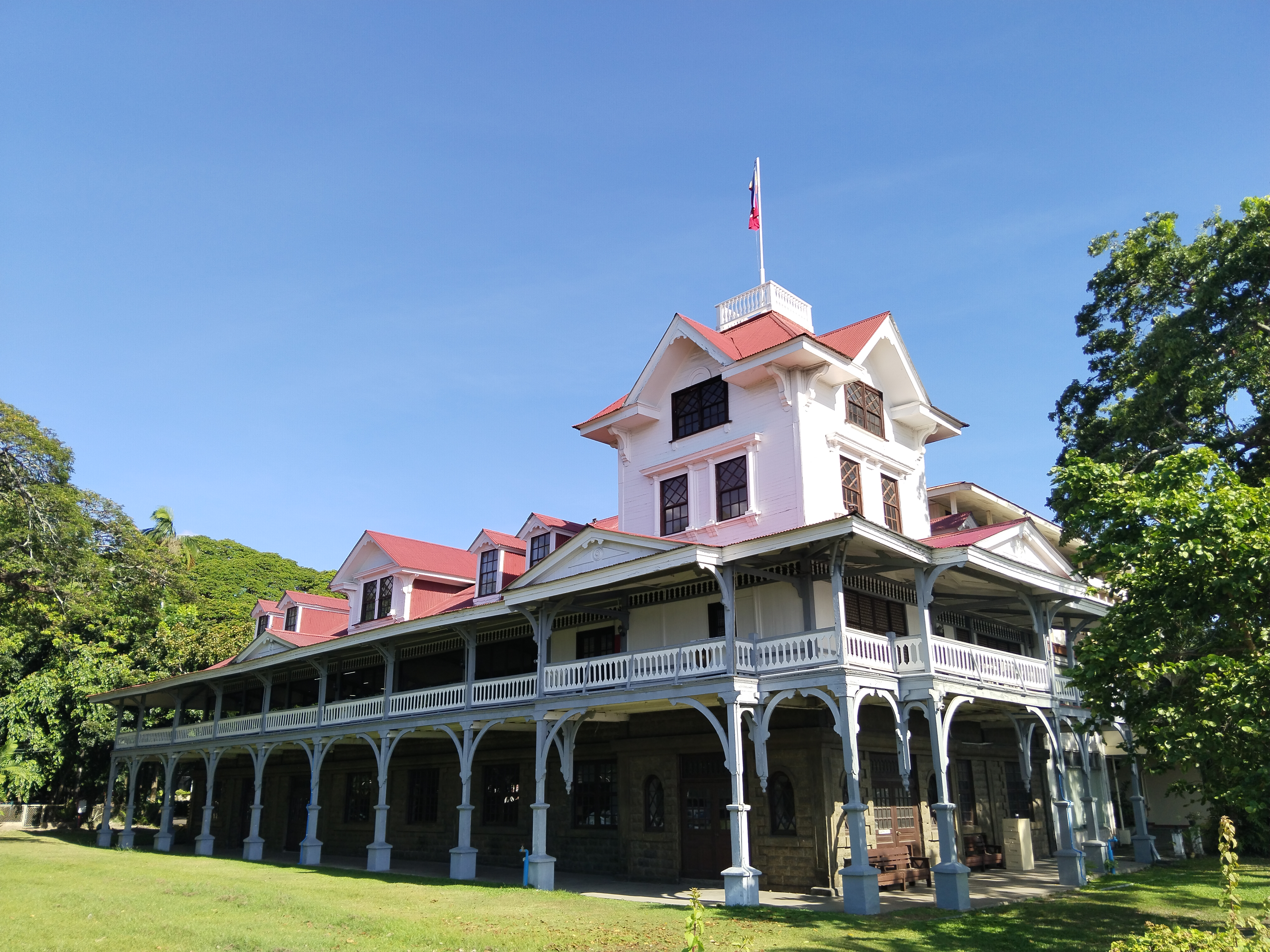
Silliman University

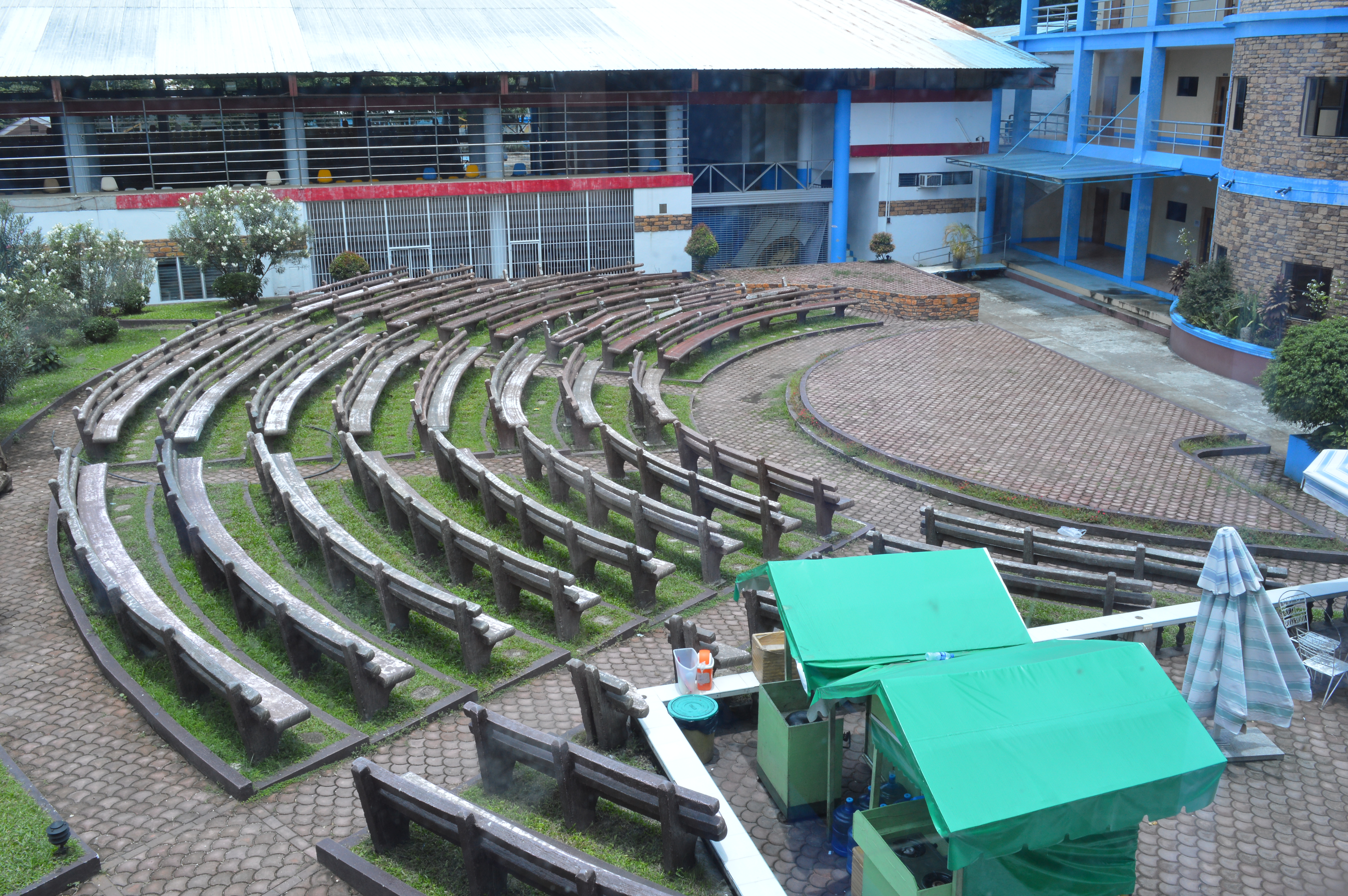
Negros Oriental State University

Most colleges and universities in the province are concentrated in Dumaguete, called the Center of Learning in the South, which is widely known as a university city. The following tables show a list of some universities, colleges, and other tertiary institutions located in the province of Negros Oriental.

=== Colleges and universities ===
School	Location
AMA Computer College	Dumaguete
Asian College	Dumaguete
Colegio de Santa Catalina de Alejandria	Dumaguete
Diaz College	Tanjay City
Foundation University	Dumaguete
La Consolacion College Bais	Bais
Maxino College	Dumaguete
Metro Dumaguete College	Dumaguete
Negros College Inc.	Ayungon
Negros Maritime College Foundation Inc.	Sibulan
Negros Oriental State University Main & Bajumpandan Campuses	Dumaguete
Negros Oriental State University Bais Campuses I & II	Bais
Negros Oriental State University Bayawan-Sta. Catalina Campus	Bayawan/Santa Catalina
Negros Oriental State University Guihulngan City Campus	Guihulngan City
Negros Oriental State University Mabinay Campus	Mabinay
Negros Oriental State University Pamplona Campus	Pamplona
Negros Oriental State University Siaton Campus	Siaton
Presbyterian Theological College	Dumaguete
Saint Francis College – Guihulngan	Guihulngan City
Saint Joseph College of Canlaon, Inc.	Canlaon
Saint Joseph Seminary College	Sibulan
STI College	Dumaguete
Silliman University	Dumaguete
St. Paul University Dumaguete	Dumaguete
Southern Tech College	Bayawan
Villaflores College	Tanjay City

=== Public high schools ===
School	Location
Tanjay National High School (main)	Tanjay City
Tanjay Science High School	Tanjay City
Bais City National Science High School	Bais City
Dumaguete Science High School	Dumaguete City
Taclobo High School	Dumaguete City
Maria Macahig Memorial High School	Siaton
Don Emilio Macias Memorial National High School	Santa Catalina

== Culture ==
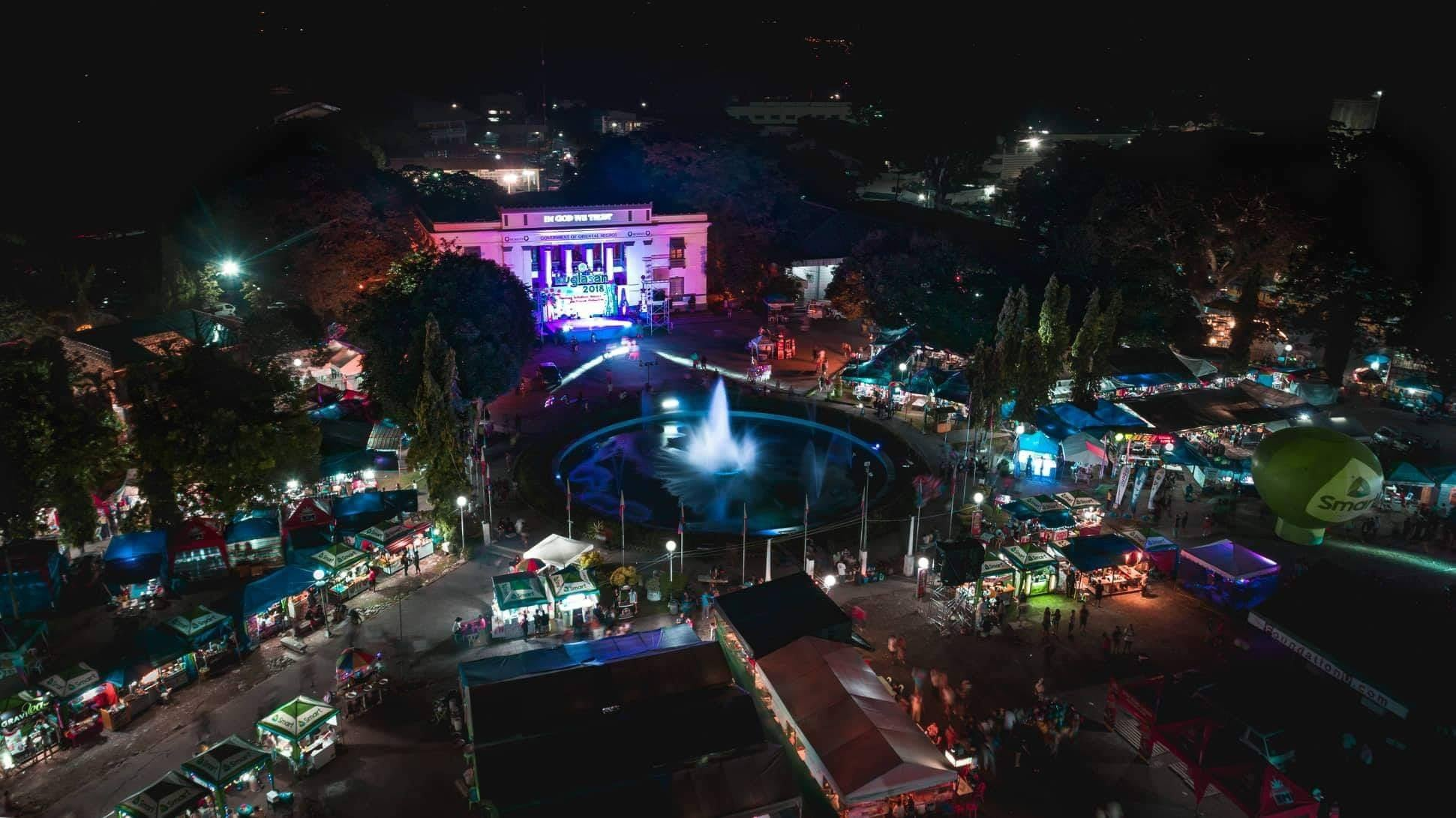
Buglasan Festival at the Ninoy Aquino Memorial Freedom Park in Dumaguete

Each town in Negros Oriental celebrates an annual town fiesta, usually dedicated to a patron saint of a particular town or city. In some of the larger towns, there are particular fiestas for specific neighborhoods or barangays.

1. Jimalalud: January 15 - Sr. Sto. Niño
2. Canlaon: March 19 - Sr. San Jose
3. Ayungon: May 15 - St. Isidore the Farmer
4. Sibulan: June 13 - St. Anthony of Padua
5. Tayasan: June 13 - St. Anthony of Padua
6. Tanjay City: July 25 - St. James the Greater
7. Bacong: August 28 - St. Augustine of Hippo
8. Bais: September 10 - St. Nicholas of Tolentino
9. Dauin: September 10 - St. Nicholas of Tolentino
10. Manjuyod: October 4 - St. Francis of Assisi
11. Valencia: October 12 - Our Lady of the Abandoned
12. Dumaguete: November 25 - St. Catherine of Alexandria
13. Amlan: November 30 - St. Andrew
14. Siaton: December 6 - St. Nicholas of Bari

Additionally, the Buglasan Festival is celebrated annually in October in the provincial capital of Dumaguete and is hailed as Negros Oriental's "festival of festivals". It is a week-long celebration where unique booths of each town and city in Negros Oriental feature their native products and tourist attractions. The highlights of the occasion are the float parade and street dancing competition. Through Presidential Proclamation 695, October 25, 2024 was declared a special non-working day in celebration of its Buglasan Festival.

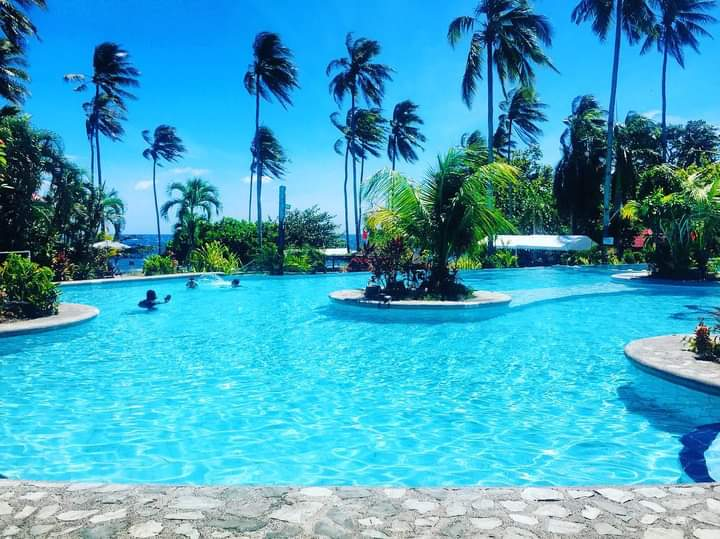
Landscape of a beach resort in Dauin, the province's resort capital. Tourism is one of the major industries in the province of Negros Oriental.

== Media ==
There are at least seven local media publications in general circulation around the province. These publications include Dumaguete MetroPost, The Negros Chronicle, Dumaguete Star Informer, Times Focus, and Island News. PLDT, Globe Telecom, DITO Telecommunity and their subsidiaries are major providers of a network connection within the province. Major providers, in TV and radio are Advanced Media Broadcasting System operating AllTV Channel 12 Dumaguete acquired from a defunct ABS-CBN Dumaguete station, People's Television Network, GMA, GTV (Philippine TV network), and TV5 Dumaguete. Cable TV and pay TV providers like G Sat, Cignal TV and SatLite provides access to Kapamilya Channel, BBC, ESPN, and other international programs. The province is mainly served before by one regional newscast: TV Patrol Central Visayas (shared with ABS-CBN Cebu).

== Notable personalities ==
=== Outside Dumaguete ===
- Teofisto Guingona Jr. - 48th Secretary of Justice (Philippines), Senator of the Philippines, 11th Vice President of the Philippines, Secretary of Foreign Affairs (Siaton)
- Demetrio Larena Sr. – first Governor of Negros Oriental (Bais)
- Valeen Montenegro Vicente – Actress TV Personality (Bais)
- Eddie Romero – National Artist for Film and Broadcast Arts (Bais)
- Jose Mari Chan – Singer, Songwriter and Businessman in the sugar industry (having roots from Bais but currently lives in Iloilo)
- Juanita Amatong – former secretary of Department of Finance (Bindoy)
- Felix Makasiar – 14th Chief Justice of the Philippine Supreme Court (Siaton)
- Roel Degamo – former governor of Negros Oriental (Siaton)
- Chanda Romero – Philippine actress (Bais and Tanjay)
- Eddie Romero – National Artist of the Philippines for Cinema and Broadcast Arts (Tanjay)
- Jose E. Romero Muñoz – Philippine (formerly American) statesman and ambassador to the Court of St. James's
- Jose V. Romero Jr. – Philippine diplomat (Tanjay)
- Emilio Yap – Philippine Chinese businessman (Tanjay)
- Mariano Muñoz – first Spanish professor and head of the Language department at Silliman University (Tanjay)
- María Cristina Sangróniz de Vázquez Prada – Spanish-Philippine socialite (Tanjay)
- Bishop Daniel Patrick Yee Parcon – current bishop of the Roman Catholic Diocese of Talibon in Bohol (Vallehermoso)

== See also ==
- Dumaguete
- Balinsasayao Twin Lakes Natural Park
