= Siaton =

Municipality in Negros Oriental, Philippines

- Municipality
- Municipality of Siaton
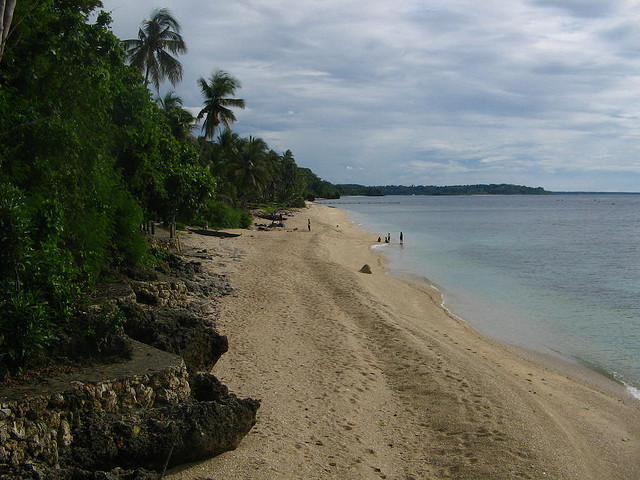
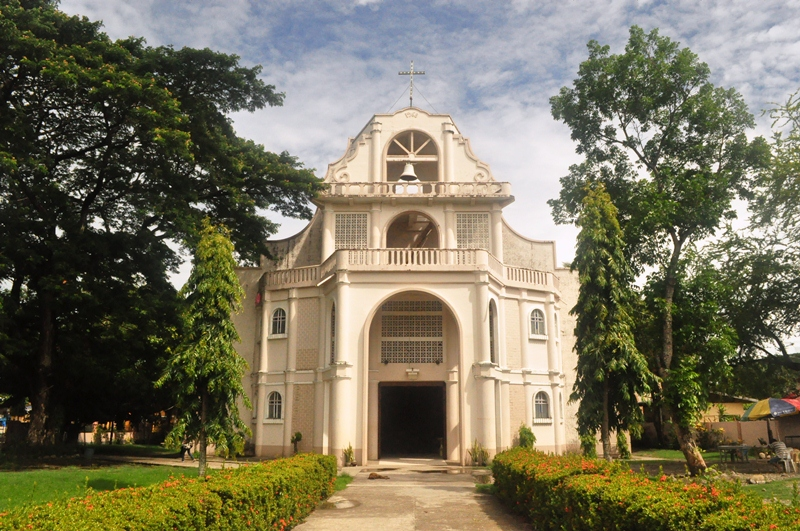
- Left: Antulang Beach; Right: San Nicolas de Bari Parish Church

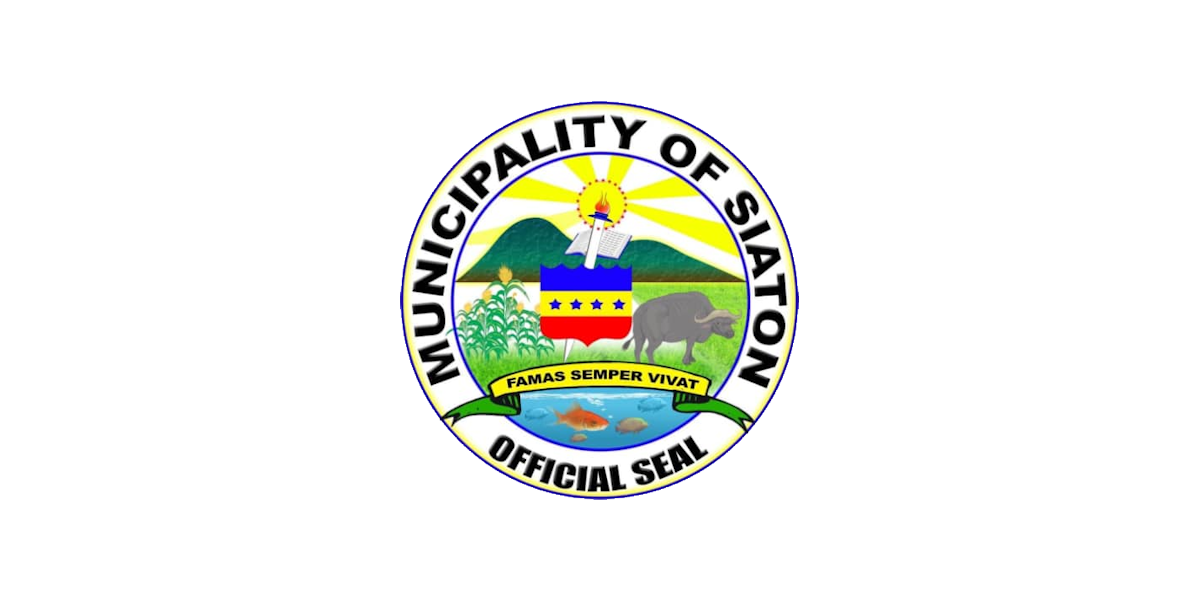
- Flag
- Nickname: Southland by the Sea
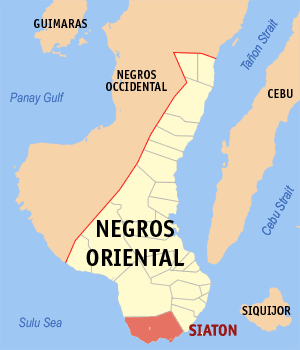
- Map of Negros Oriental with Siaton highlighted
- Interactive map of Siaton
- Location within the Philippines
- Coordinates: 9°04′N 123°02′E
- Country: Philippines
- Region: Negros Island Region
- Province: Negros Oriental
- District: 3rd district
- Barangays: 26 (see Barangays)

Government
  - Type: Sangguniang Bayan
  - Mayor: Albert G. Ator (Ind)
  - Vice Mayor: Jocelyn Arbolado-Kitane (Ind)
  - Representative: Janice Degamo (Lakas)
  - Municipal Council: Members: Vincent Emil T. Arbolado; William A. Kirit; Emelyn M. Gadingan; Nestle C. Villacampa; Ma. Alona R. Ator; Norberto E. Ragay; Rowel C. Gabo; Steve K. Macahig; Lilian Gomez ^{‡}; Dharlyn Grace E. Kibo ^{◌}; ‡ ex officio ABC president; ◌ ex officio SK chairman
  - Electorate: 55,022 voters (2025)

Area
  - Total: 335.90 km^{2} (129.69 sq mi)
- Elevation: 103 m (338 ft)
- Highest elevation: 1,833 m (6,014 ft)
- Lowest elevation: 0 m (0 ft)

Population (2024 census)
  - Total: 84,169
  - Density: 250.58/km^{2} (648.99/sq mi)
  - Households: 19,672

Economy
  - Income class: 1st municipal income class
  - Poverty incidence: 40.84% (2023)
  - Revenue: ₱ 378.3 million (2022)
  - Assets: ₱ 1,137 million (2022)
  - Expenditure: ₱ 245.5 million (2022)
  - Liabilities: ₱ 435.5 million (2022)

Service provider
  - Electricity: Negros Oriental 2 Electric Cooperative (NORECO 2)
- Time zone: UTC+8 (PST)
- ZIP code: 6219
- PSGC: 1804619000
- IDD : area code: +63 (0)35
- Native languages: Cebuano; Magahat; Tagalog

Siaton (Cebuano: Lungsod sa Siaton; Tagalog: Bayan ng Siaton), officially the Municipality of Siaton, is a municipality and the southernmost settlement in the province of Negros Oriental, Philippines. According to the 2024 census, it has a population of 84,169 people.

The town is home to the Minagahat language, the indigenous language of Southern Negros as listed by the Komisyon ng Wikang Filipino. The language is vital to the culture and arts of the people.

Siaton is 50 kilometres (31 mi) from Dumaguete.

Lake Balanan is located in Siaton.

== Geography ==
=== Barangays ===
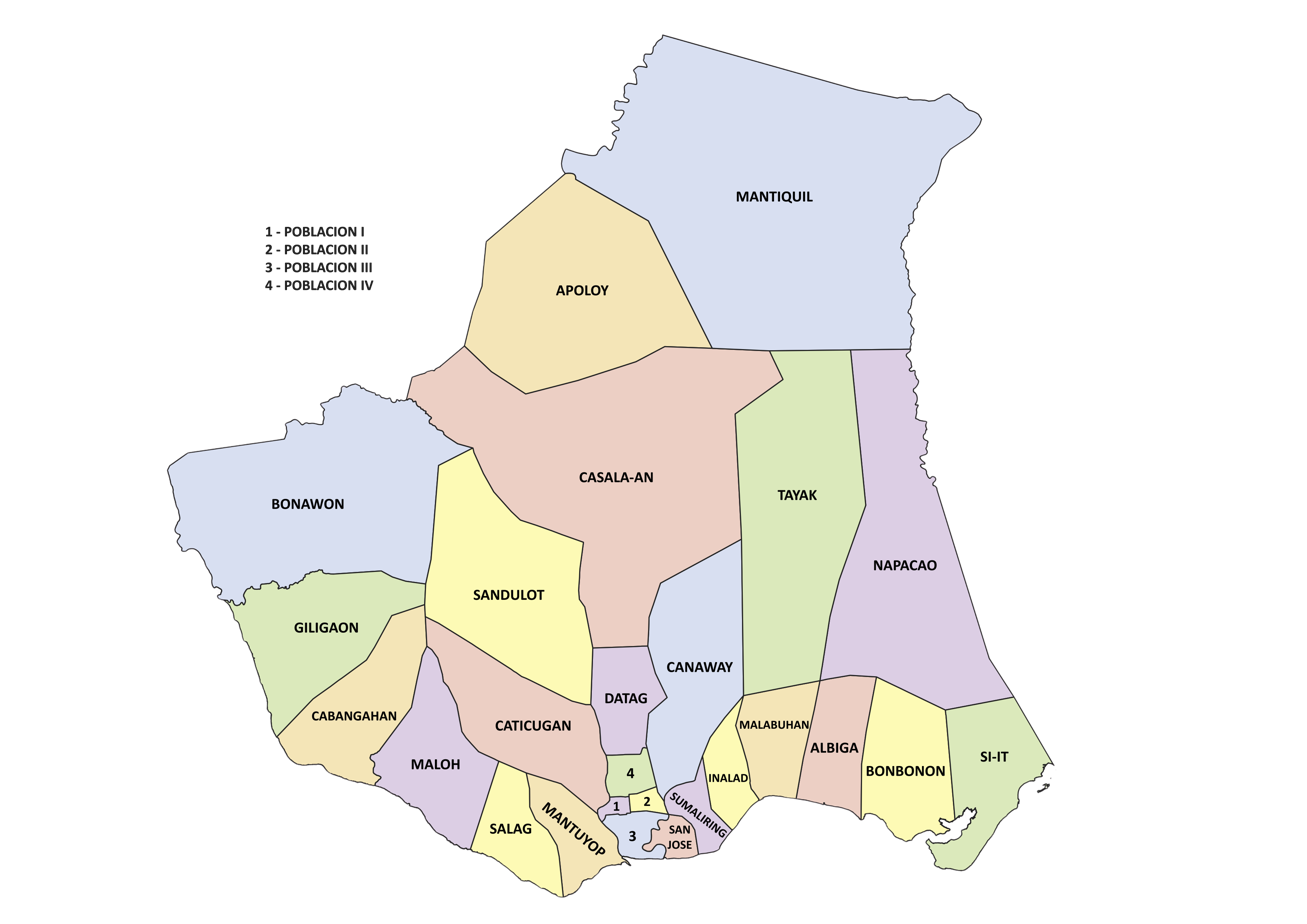
Political map of Siaton

Siaton is politically subdivided into 26 barangays. Each barangay consists of puroks and some have sitios.

PSGC	Barangay	Population			±% p.a.	
		2024		2010		
074619001	Albiga	2.3%	1,941	1,516	▴	1.72%
074619002	Apoloy	2.8%	2,378	2,337	▴	0.12%
074619003	Bonawon	11.0%	9,288	9,078	▴	0.16%
074619004	Bonbonon	2.5%	2,136	1,961	▴	0.59%
074619005	Cabangahan	4.4%	3,688	3,503	▴	0.36%
074619007	Canaway	4.2%	3,548	3,512	▴	0.07%
074619008	Casala-an	4.9%	4,108	3,557	▴	1.00%
074619009	Caticugan	3.3%	2,767	2,447	▴	0.85%
074619010	Datag	2.7%	2,232	1,778	▴	1.59%
074619011	Giligaon	6.2%	5,214	4,816	▴	0.55%
074619012	Inalad	2.3%	1,915	1,869	▴	0.17%
074619013	Malabuhan	4.3%	3,622	3,080	▴	1.13%
074619014	Maloh	7.6%	6,421	5,314	▴	1.32%
074619015	Mantiquil	3.6%	3,002	2,360	▴	1.68%
074619016	Mantuyop	2.6%	2,220	1,842	▴	1.30%
074619017	Napacao	4.2%	3,521	2,436	▴	2.58%
074619018	Poblacion 1	2.2%	1,886	1,930	▾	−0.16%
074619019	Poblacion 2	2.6%	2,168	2,054	▴	0.37%
074619020	Poblacion 3	4.3%	3,608	2,589	▴	2.32%
074619021	Poblacion 4	2.4%	2,051	1,810	▴	0.87%
074619022	Salag	3.1%	2,617	2,776	▾	−0.41%
074619023	San Jose	1.5%	1,269	935	▴	2.14%
074619024	Sandulot	4.1%	3,419	3,334	▴	0.17%
074619025	Si-it	3.1%	2,599	2,104	▴	1.47%
074619026	Sumaliring	2.8%	2,354	1,979	▴	1.21%
074619027	Tayak	3.7%	3,110	2,368	▴	1.90%
	Total		84,169	73,285	▴	0.96%

=== Climate ===
Climate data for Siaton, Negros Oriental
Month	Jan	Feb	Mar	Apr	May	Jun	Jul	Aug	Sep	Oct	Nov	Dec	Year
Mean daily maximum °C (°F)	31 (88)	31 (88)	32 (90)	33 (91)	31 (88)	30 (86)	29 (84)	29 (84)	29 (84)	29 (84)	30 (86)	30 (86)	30 (87)
Mean daily minimum °C (°F)	22 (72)	22 (72)	22 (72)	24 (75)	25 (77)	25 (77)	25 (77)	25 (77)	25 (77)	25 (77)	24 (75)	23 (73)	24 (75)
Average precipitation mm (inches)	46 (1.8)	45 (1.8)	56 (2.2)	83 (3.3)	163 (6.4)	203 (8.0)	236 (9.3)	204 (8.0)	210 (8.3)	211 (8.3)	143 (5.6)	77 (3.0)	1,677 (66)
Average rainy days	12.1	9.8	14.3	17.5	26.0	27.8	28.4	26.9	26.7	27.9	23.3	17.2	257.9
Source: Meteoblue

== Demographics ==
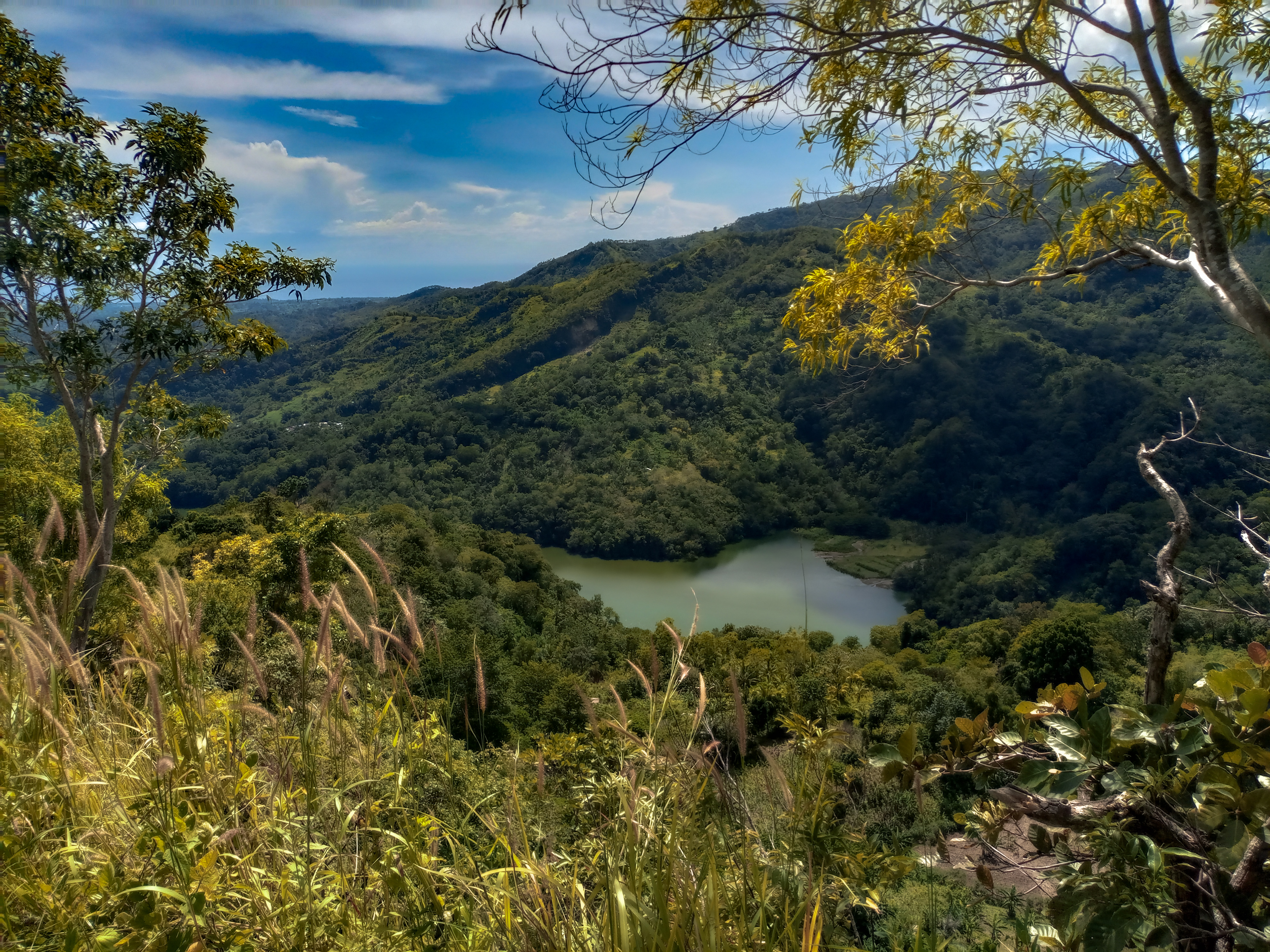
Lake Balanan

Population census of Siaton
Year	Pop.	±% p.a.
1903	10,074	—
1918	13,183	+1.81%
1939	16,968	+1.21%
1948	17,926	+0.61%
1960	22,467	+1.90%
1970	26,963	+1.84%
1975	34,316	+4.96%
1980	38,612	+2.39%
1990	48,982	+2.41%
1995	57,313	+2.99%
2000	64,258	+2.48%
2007	67,943	+0.77%
2010	73,285	+2.79%
2015	77,696	+1.12%
2020	83,082	+1.42%
2024	84,169	+0.31%
Source: Philippine Statistics Authority

== Economy ==
Poverty incidence of Siaton (%)

Source: Philippine Statistics Authority

== Education ==
The public schools in the town of Siaton are administered by four school districts under the Schools Division of Negros Oriental.

=== Elementary schools ===
- Albiga Elementary School — Albiga
- Antulang Elementary School — Sitio Antulang, Si-it
- Apoloy Elementary School — Apoloy
- Apoloy ES - Estakahan Extension — Sitio Estakahan, Apoloy
- Bantolinao Elementary School — Sitio Bantolinao, Cabangahan
- Bonbonon Elementary School — Bonbonon
- Bunay Elementary School — Sitio Bunay, Bonawon
- Cabangahan Elementary School — Cabangahan
- Calangag Elementary School — Sitio Calangag, Bonawon
- Calañan Elementary School — Sitio Calañan, Bonawon
- Canaway Elementary School — Canaway
- Candugay Elementary School — Sitio Candugay, Casala-an
- Casalaan Elementary School — Casala-an
- Caticugan Elementary School — Caticugan
- Catipon Elementary School — Sitio Catipon, Bonawon
- Cruz Gadiane Elementary School — Sitio Panablawan, Salag
- Datag Elementary School — Datag
- Felipe Tayko Memorial School — Nat'l Highway, Poblacion 1
- Giligaon Elementary School — Giligaon
- Hagikhik Elementary School — Sitio Hagikhik, Apoloy
- Kabangkalan Elementary School — Sitio Kabangkalan, Tayak
- Lamberto L. Macias Elementary School — Sitio Cambonbon, Sandulot
- Lico-Lico Elementary School — Sitio Lico-Lico, Bonawon
- Lindy Pajunar Memorial School — Napacao
- Luan-Luan Elementary School — Sitio Luan-Luan, Canaway
- Maladpad Elementary School — Sitio Maladpad, Giligaon
- Maloh Central School — Maloh
- Managobsob Elementary School — Sitio Managobsob, Sandulot
- Mantiquil Elementary School — Mantiquil
- Mantuyop Elementary School — Mantuyop
- Nawacat Elementary School — Sitio Nawacat, Casala-an
- Nasipit Elementary School — Sitio Nasipit, Cabangahan
- Olambid Elementary School — Sitio Olambid, Apoloy
- Pagang Elementary School — Sitio Pagang, Caticugan
- Palayuhan Elementary School — Sitio Palayuhan, Si-it
- Pio Macahig Memorial Elementary School — Bonawon
- Ramon Ponce de Leon Elementary School — Malabuhan
- Salag Elementary School — Salag
- Salingkubong Elementary School — Sitio Salingkubong, Tayak
- Sandulot Elementary School — Sandulot
- San Jose Elementary School — San Jose
- Sumaliring Elementary School — Sumaliring
- Talaptap Elementary School — Sitio Talaptap, Giligaon
- Tayak Elementary School — Tayak
- Ulayan Elementary School — Sitio Ulayan, Maloh

=== High schools ===
- Aurelia G. Merecido Memorial High School — Cabangahan
- Cambonbon National High School — Sitio Cambonbon, Sandulot
- Candugay High School — Sitio Candugay, Casala-an
- Caticugan High School — Caticugan
- Giligaon High School — Giligaon
- Lorenza P. Palarpalar Memorial High School — Bonbonon
- Mainit High School — Sitio Mainit, Tayak
- Maloh Provincial Community High School — Maloh
- Mantiquil Masaligan High School — Mantiquil
- Maria Macahig National High School — Bonawon
- Paciente Cesar G. Cabrera High School — Napacao
- Palayuhan High School — Sitio Palayuhan, Si-it
- Siaton National High School — Progresso Street, Poblacion 3
- Siaton Science High School — Mantuyop
- Sumaliring High School — Sumaliring

=== Private schools ===
- Arjune Learning Center — Burgos Street, Poblacion 2
- Bautista Tayko Memorial SDA Elementary School Inc. — Bonawon
- Carmel High School — Nat'l Highway, Poblacion 1

== Notable personalities ==
- Roel Degamo, former governor of Negros Oriental
- Teofisto Guingona Jr. - 48th Secretary of Justice (Philippines), Senator of the Philippines, 11th Vice President of the Philippines, Secretary of Foreign Affairs
- TG Guingona - Senator of the Philippines
- Felix Makasiar, 14th Chief Justice of the Philippine Supreme Court
