= Guihulngan =

Component city in Negros Oriental, Philippines

- Component city
- City of Guihulngan
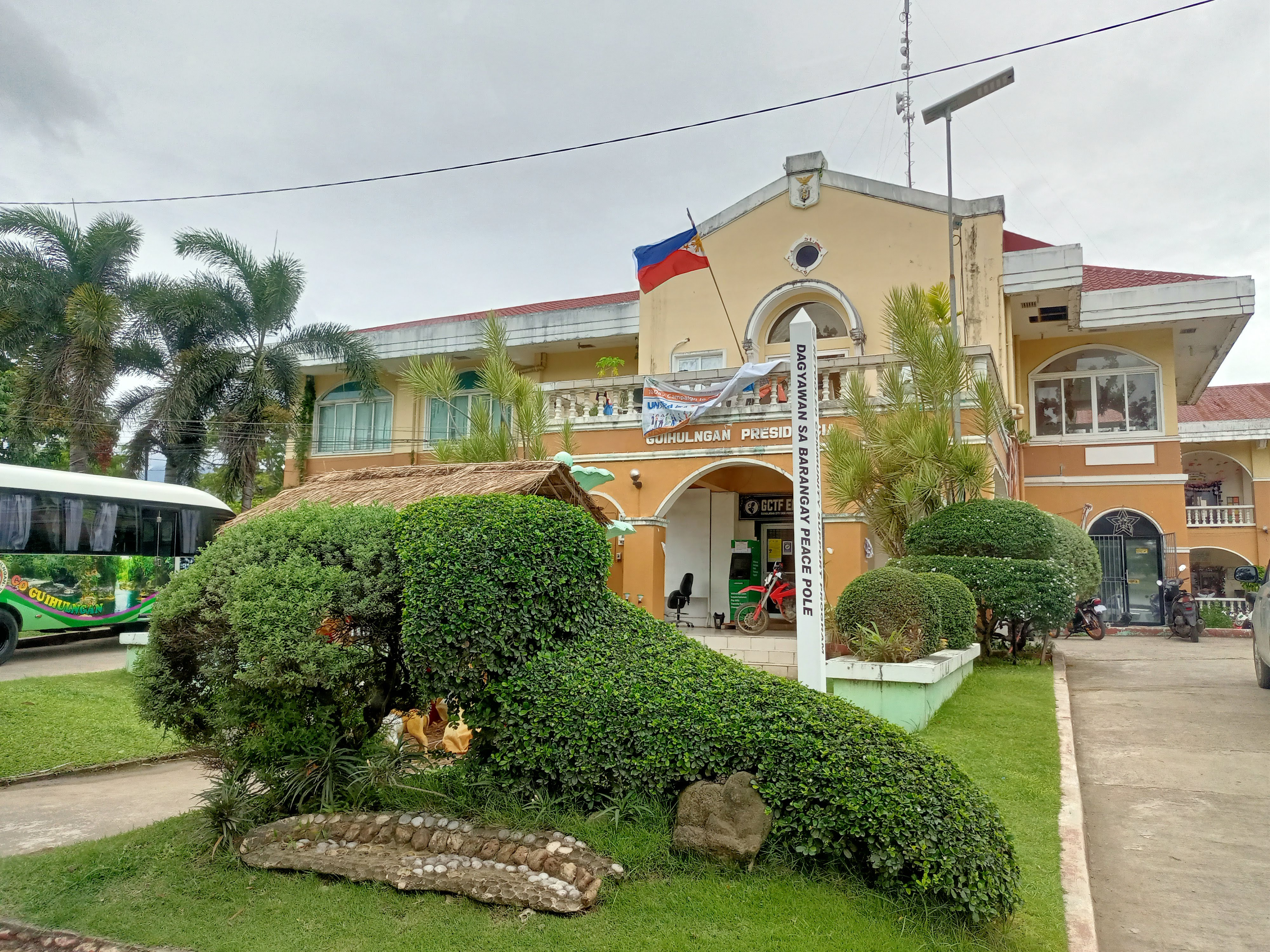
- Guihulngan City Hall

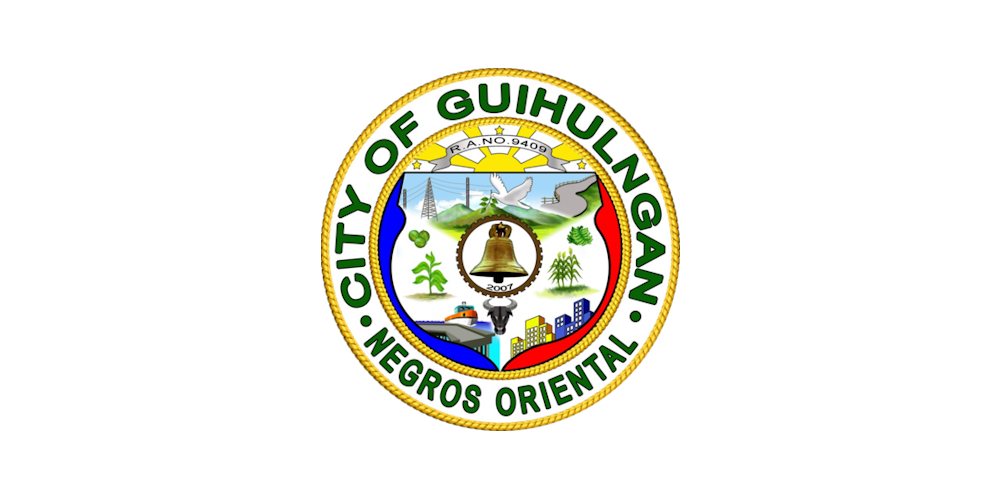
- Flag Seal
- Nickname: The Rising City of the North
- Motto: Abanté Guihulngan!
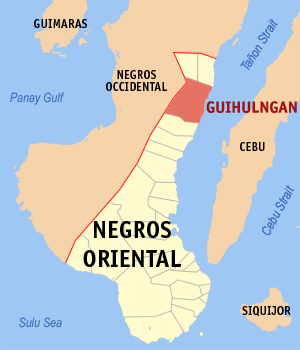
- Map of Negros Oriental with Guihulngan highlighted
- Interactive map of Guihulngan
- Location within the Philippines
- Coordinates: 10°07′N 123°16′E
- Country: Philippines
- Region: Negros Island Region
- Province: Negros Oriental
- District: 1st district
- Founded: 1800
- Cityhood: July 14, 2007 (Lost cityhood in 2008 and 2010)
- Affirmed Cityhood: February 15, 2011
- Barangays: 33 (see Barangays)

Government
  - Type: Sangguniang Panlungsod
  - Mayor: Filomeno L. Reyes (NP)
  - Vice Mayor: Ana Eunica Beatriz A. Reyes (NP)
  - Representative: Emmanuel L. Iway (PFP)
  - City Council: Members: Gian Carlo A. Mijares; Alvin Lance M. Trinidad; Melbourne T. Bustamante; Earl Joseph P. Molas; Lorelyn Sharaim S. Besario; Kim Isaac R. Antique; Angelito M. Pique; Paulo Edison D. De la Rita, Jr.; Shamgar T. Casipong; Maria Theresa V. Rizon; Paulo Humiliano T. Rodiguez ^{‡}; Melgin S. Bulandres, Jr. ^{◌}; ‡ ex officio ABC president; ◌ ex officio SK chairman
  - Electorate: 65,110 voters (2025)

Area
  - Total: 388.56 km^{2} (150.02 sq mi)
- Elevation: 194 m (636 ft)
- Highest elevation: 1,195 m (3,921 ft)
- Lowest elevation: 0 m (0 ft)

Population (2024 census)
  - Total: 106,576
  - Density: 274.28/km^{2} (710.39/sq mi)
  - Households: 24,792

Economy
  - Income class: 2nd city income class
  - Poverty incidence: 35.52% (2023)
  - Revenue: ₱ 1,112 million (2024)
  - Assets: ₱ 3,817 million (2024)
  - Expenditure: ₱ 632.4 million (2024)
  - Liabilities: ₱ 1,085 million (2024)

Service provider
  - Electricity: Negros Oriental 1 Electric Cooperative (NORECO 1)
- Time zone: UTC+8 (PST)
- ZIP code: 6214
- PSGC: 074611000
- IDD : area code: +63 (0)34
- Native languages: Cebuano; Tagalog
- Website: www.guihulngan.gov.ph

Guihulngan, officially the City of Guihulngan (Cebuano: Dakbayan sa Guihulngan; Filipino: Lungsod ng Guihulngan), is a component city in the province of Negros Oriental, Philippines. According to the 2024 census, it has a population of 106,576 people. Making it the third-most populous city in Negros Oriental after the cities of Dumaguete and Bayawan.

Guihulngan is also dubbed by its residents as the "rising city of the north".

== Etymology ==
There are numerous versions of how the city got its name. According to legend, the first was caused by a river that flowed directly to the town proper from the mainspring at Sitio Anahaw, Barangay Nagsaha, hence the name "Guipadulngan," which means the place where the river flows to its end.

== History ==
Some of the towns of early creation were founded at the close of the 18th century and the beginning of the 19th century. Dauin, for example, was founded in 1787, Tayasan, in 1790; Jimalalud, in 1797; Guijulñgan, in 1800; and Bacong, in 1801.

As constituted in 1898, it included the following towns: Amblan, Ayungon, Ayuquitan, Bacong, Bais, Bayanan, Canoan, Dauin, Dumaguete (capital), Guijulñgan, Manjuyod, Nueva Valencia, Siaton, Tanjay, Tayasan, Tolon, and Zamboanguita.

The second is associated with the gruesome incident in the 19th century when the Philippines was a colony of Spain; men and women of different ages were said to be captured, beheaded and thrown into the sea by the Moros, now known as Tañon Strait. Other accounts claim that the Moro invaders dropped a bell into the sea when they found out that it was used by the lookout to warn the townsfolk of their coming. Since that time, the place has been called Guihulugan which means, "Place where a thing was dropped". But in the Spanish writing, "U" and "N" are similar, which is why it became commonly written and known as Guihulngan.

Whether it originated as Guipadulngan or Guihulngan, the name is indeed symbolic, as the town is “dropped” with abundant blessings from the Almighty for a significant "end".

In 17th century map Murillo-Velarde Map it somewhat appears as Dijolongan.

Three barrios were created in 1959.

=== Cityhood ===
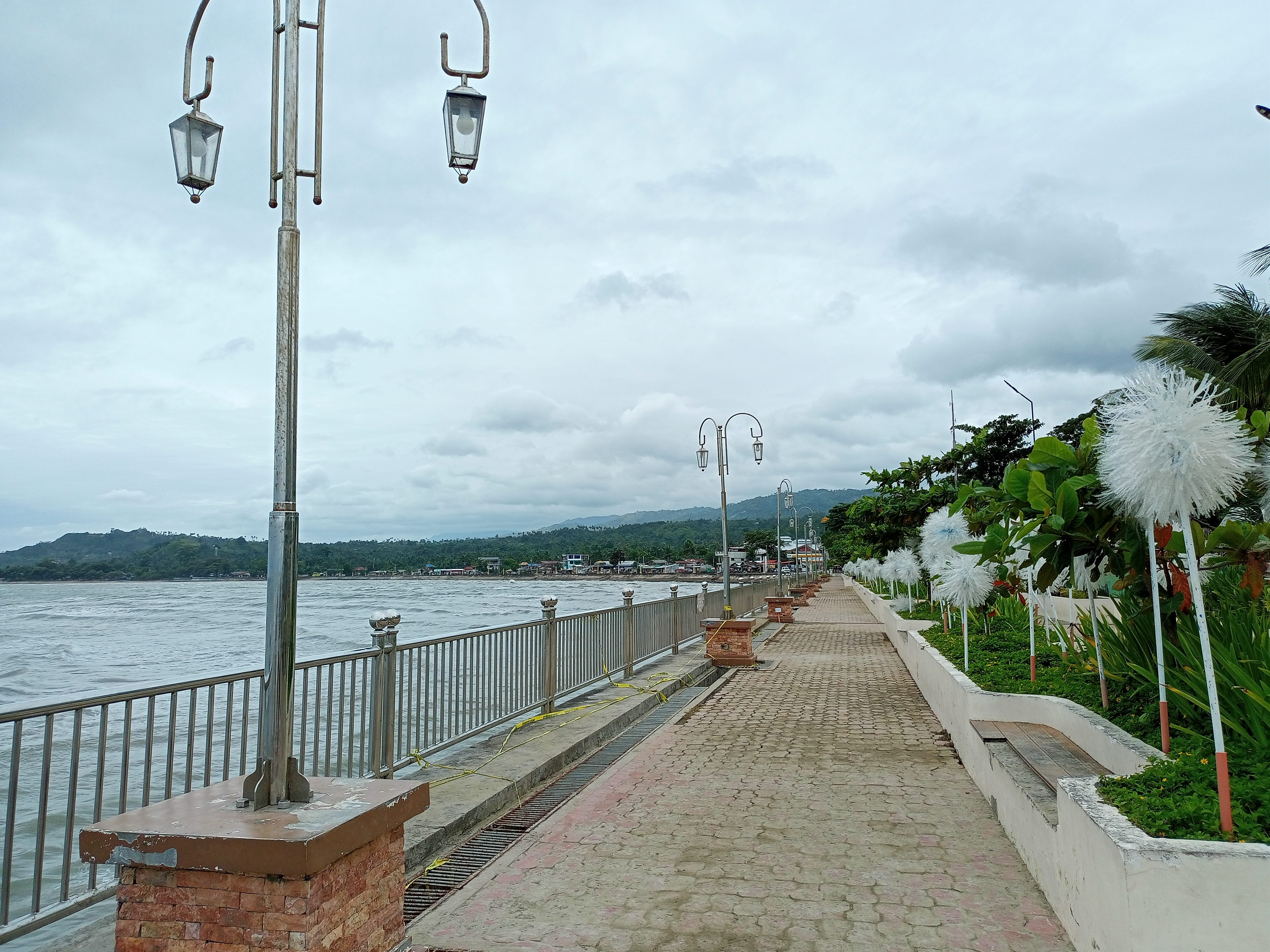
Esplanade at the Guihulngan Rizal Freedom Park Boulevard

On July 14, 2007, Guihulngan becomes a city in the province of Negros Oriental through ratification of Republic Act 9409 which was approved last March 24.

The Supreme Court declared the cityhood law of Guihulngan and 15 other cities unconstitutional after a petition filed by the League of Cities of the Philippines in its ruling on November 18, 2008. On December 22, 2009, the cityhood law of Guihulngan and 15 other municipalities regain its status as cities again after the court reversed its ruling on November 18, 2008. On August 23, 2010, the court reinstated its ruling on November 18, 2008, causing Guihulngan and 15 cities to become regular municipalities. Finally, on February 15, 2011, Guihulngan becomes a city again including the 15 municipalities declaring that the conversion to cityhood met all legal requirements.

After six years of legal battle, in its board resolution, the League of Cities of the Philippines acknowledged and recognized the cityhood of Guihulngan and 15 other cities.

== Geography ==
Guihulngan is located in the northern part of the province on the coast of Tañon Strait.

It is 116 kilometres (72 mi) from Dumaguete and 115 kilometres (71 mi) from Bacolod via Isabela.

=== Barangays ===
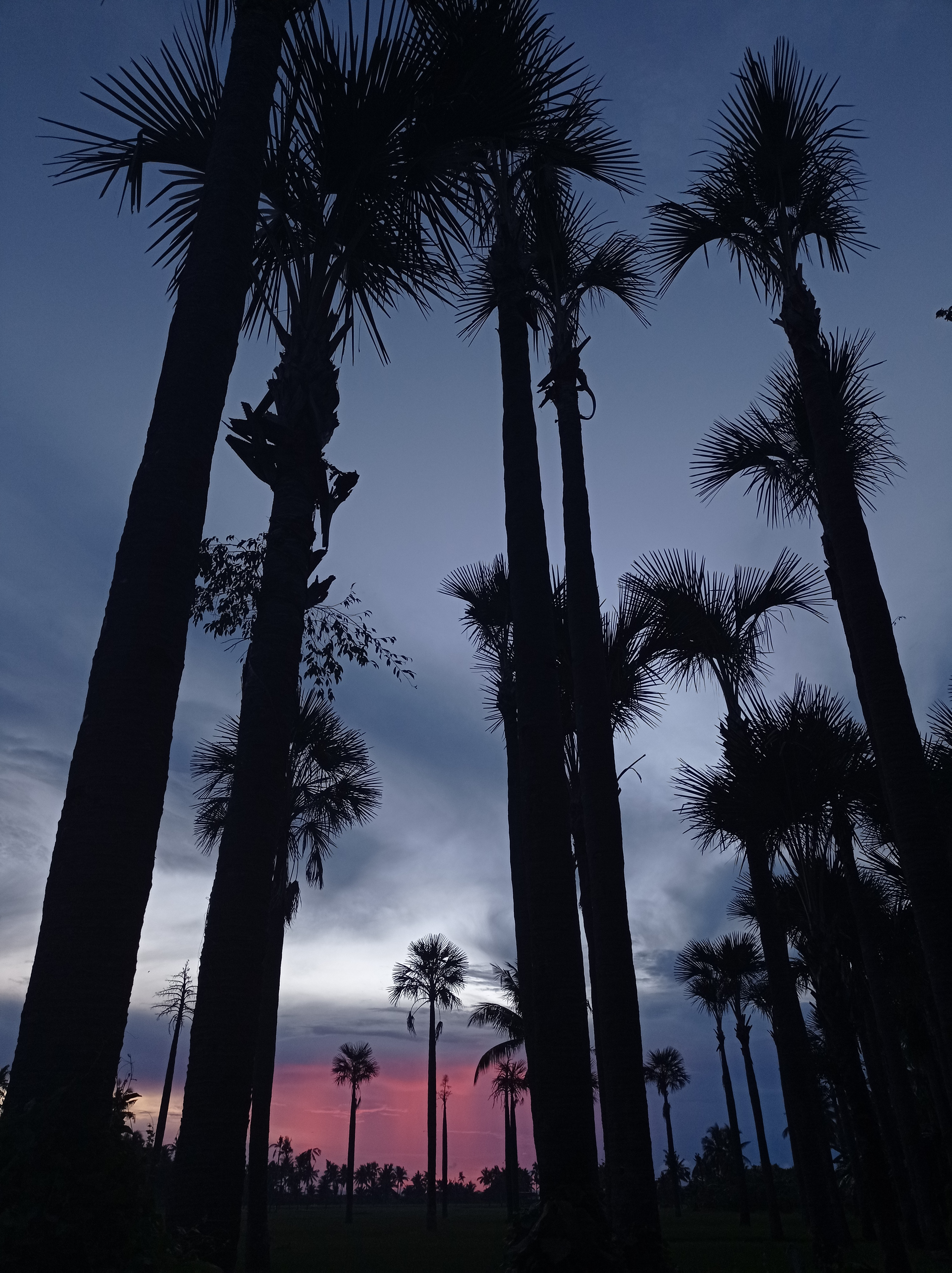
Barangay Hibaiyo landscape

Guihulngan is politically subdivided into 33 barangays. Each barangay consists of puroks and some have sitios.

PSGC	Barangay	Population			±% p.a.	
		2024		2010		
074611001	Bakid	1.2%	1,280	1,212	▴	0.38%
074611002	Balogo	2.5%	2,638	2,945	▾	−0.76%
074611003	Banwague	1.4%	1,484	1,438	▴	0.22%
074611004	Basak	4.0%	4,231	4,086	▴	0.24%
074611005	Binobohan	1.5%	1,600	1,727	▾	−0.53%
074611006	Buenavista	4.2%	4,474	4,390	▴	0.13%
074611007	Bulado	3.4%	3,650	3,129	▴	1.07%
074611008	Calamba	3.1%	3,258	3,265	▾	−0.01%
074611009	Calupa-an	1.8%	1,876	1,767	▴	0.42%
074611010	Hibaiyo	5.3%	5,602	5,068	▴	0.70%
074611011	Hilaitan	5.0%	5,329	4,990	▴	0.46%
074611012	Hinakpan	2.1%	2,262	2,214	▴	0.15%
074611013	Humayhumay	1.5%	1,563	1,378	▴	0.88%
074611014	Imelda	1.3%	1,392	1,204	▴	1.01%
074611015	Kagawasan	1.7%	1,797	1,531	▴	1.12%
074611016	Linantuyan	2.5%	2,704	2,233	▴	1.34%
074611017	Luz	1.6%	1,713	1,660	▴	0.22%
074611018	Mabunga	1.7%	1,858	1,856	▴	0.01%
074611021	Magsaysay	1.9%	2,065	1,743	▴	1.18%
074611022	Malusay	3.5%	3,727	3,295	▴	0.86%
074611023	Mani-ak	2.0%	2,181	2,173	▴	0.03%
074611019	Mckinley	2.3%	2,501	2,133	▴	1.11%
074611020	Nagsaha	1.5%	1,563	1,470	▴	0.43%
074611025	Padre Zamora	2.5%	2,707	2,273	▴	1.22%
074611026	Plagatasanon	1.0%	1,074	801	▴	2.05%
074611027	Planas	1.8%	1,887	1,619	▴	1.07%
074611028	Poblacion	15.2%	16,161	13,434	▴	1.29%
074611029	Sandayao	3.3%	3,537	3,721	▾	−0.35%
074611030	Tacpao	1.4%	1,474	1,511	▾	−0.17%
074611031	Tinayunan Beach	3.6%	3,816	3,095	▴	1.46%
074611032	Tinayunan Hill	2.4%	2,541	2,477	▴	0.18%
074611033	Trinidad	5.9%	6,318	5,864	▴	0.52%
074611034	Villegas	2.2%	2,393	1,973	▴	1.35%
	Total		106,576	93,675	▴	0.90%

=== Climate ===
Climate data for Guihulngan, Negros Oriental
Month	Jan	Feb	Mar	Apr	May	Jun	Jul	Aug	Sep	Oct	Nov	Dec	Year
Mean daily maximum °C (°F)	29 (84)	30 (86)	31 (88)	32 (90)	31 (88)	30 (86)	30 (86)	30 (86)	30 (86)	30 (86)	29 (84)	29 (84)	30 (86)
Mean daily minimum °C (°F)	23 (73)	22 (72)	23 (73)	24 (75)	25 (77)	25 (77)	25 (77)	25 (77)	25 (77)	24 (75)	24 (75)	23 (73)	24 (75)
Average precipitation mm (inches)	42 (1.7)	34 (1.3)	40 (1.6)	61 (2.4)	124 (4.9)	188 (7.4)	190 (7.5)	191 (7.5)	189 (7.4)	186 (7.3)	124 (4.9)	73 (2.9)	1,442 (56.8)
Average rainy days	10.0	8.5	9.5	12.8	22.3	26.8	28.4	27.9	27.3	27.6	20.5	13.1	234.7
Source: Meteoblue (Use with caution: this is modeled/calculated data, not measured locally.)

== Demographics ==
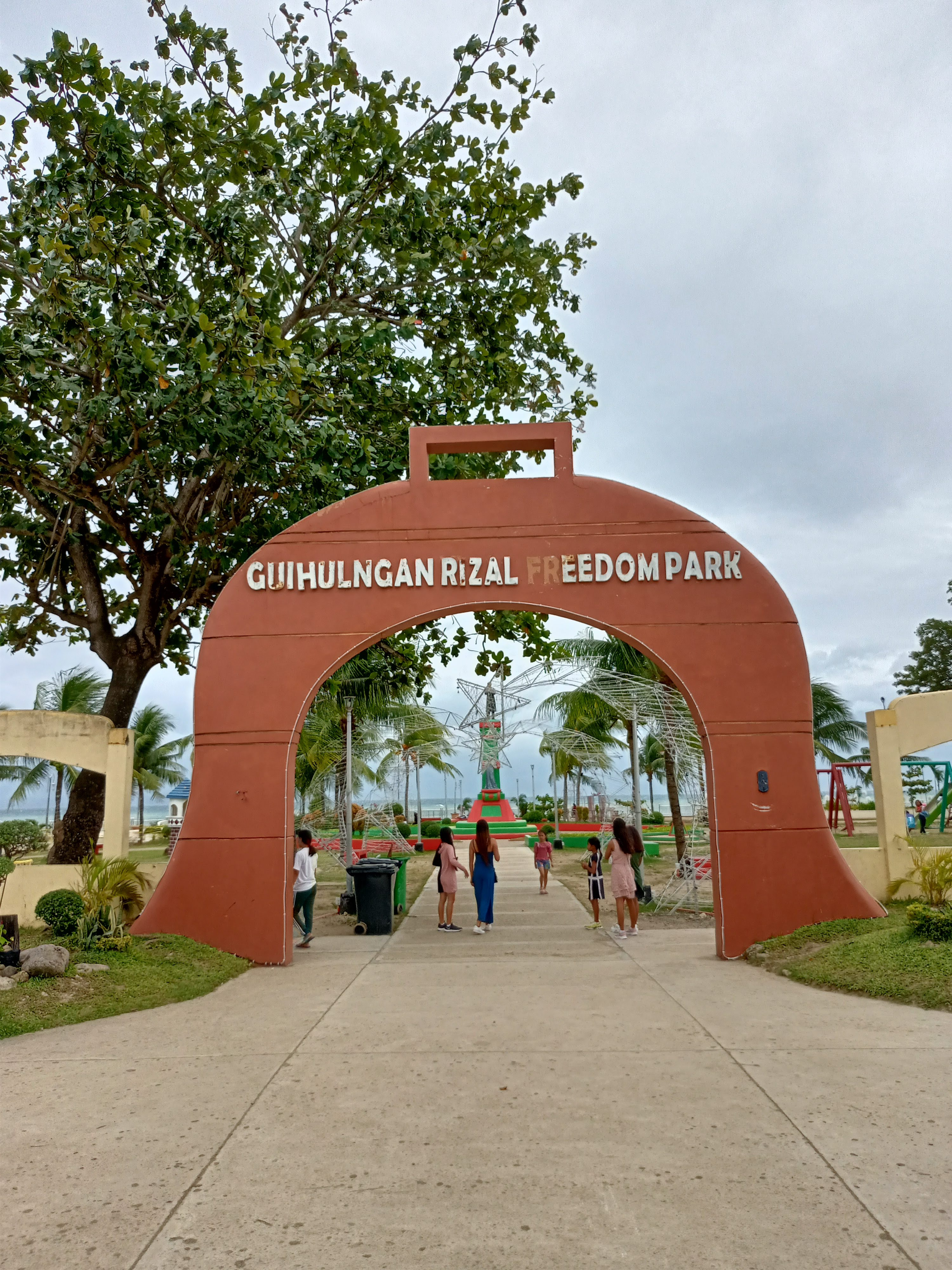
Entrance to the Guihulngan Rizal Freedom Park

Population census of Guihulngan

Year	Pop.	±% p.a.
1903	14,415	—
1918	31,069	+5.25%
1939	53,582	+2.63%
1948	89,745	+5.90%
1960	92,993	+0.30%
1970	72,969	−2.39%

Year	Pop.	±% p.a.
1975	80,041	+1.87%
1980	84,156	+1.01%
1990	74,493	−1.21%
1995	80,660	+1.50%
2000	84,607	+1.03%
2007	91,358	+1.06%

Year	Pop.	±% p.a.
2010	93,675	+0.92%
2015	95,969	+0.46%
2020	102,656	+1.43%
2024	106,576	+0.90%

Source: Philippine Statistics Authority

== Economy ==
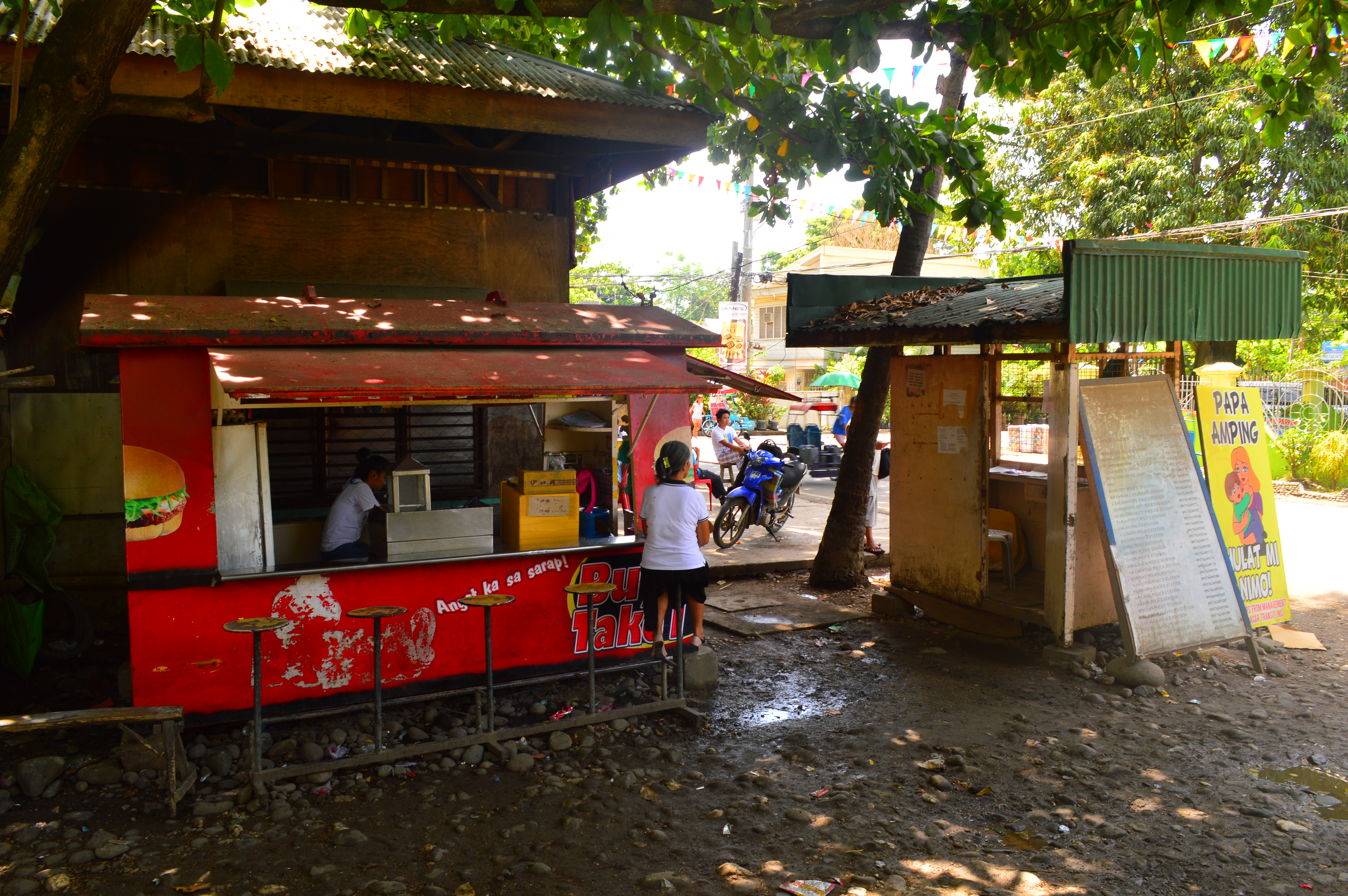
A streetcorner in downtown Guihulngan

Poverty incidence of Guihulngan (%)

Source: Philippine Statistics Authority

Guihulngan City is becoming the hub for businesses in the northern part of Negros Oriental. National and regional retail brands such as Puregold, Prince Hypermart and MR.DIY have set up their branches in the city as well as banking institutions like Philippine National Bank, Land Bank of the Philippines, Producers Bank and BDO Network Bank.

== Tourism ==
=== Landmarks ===
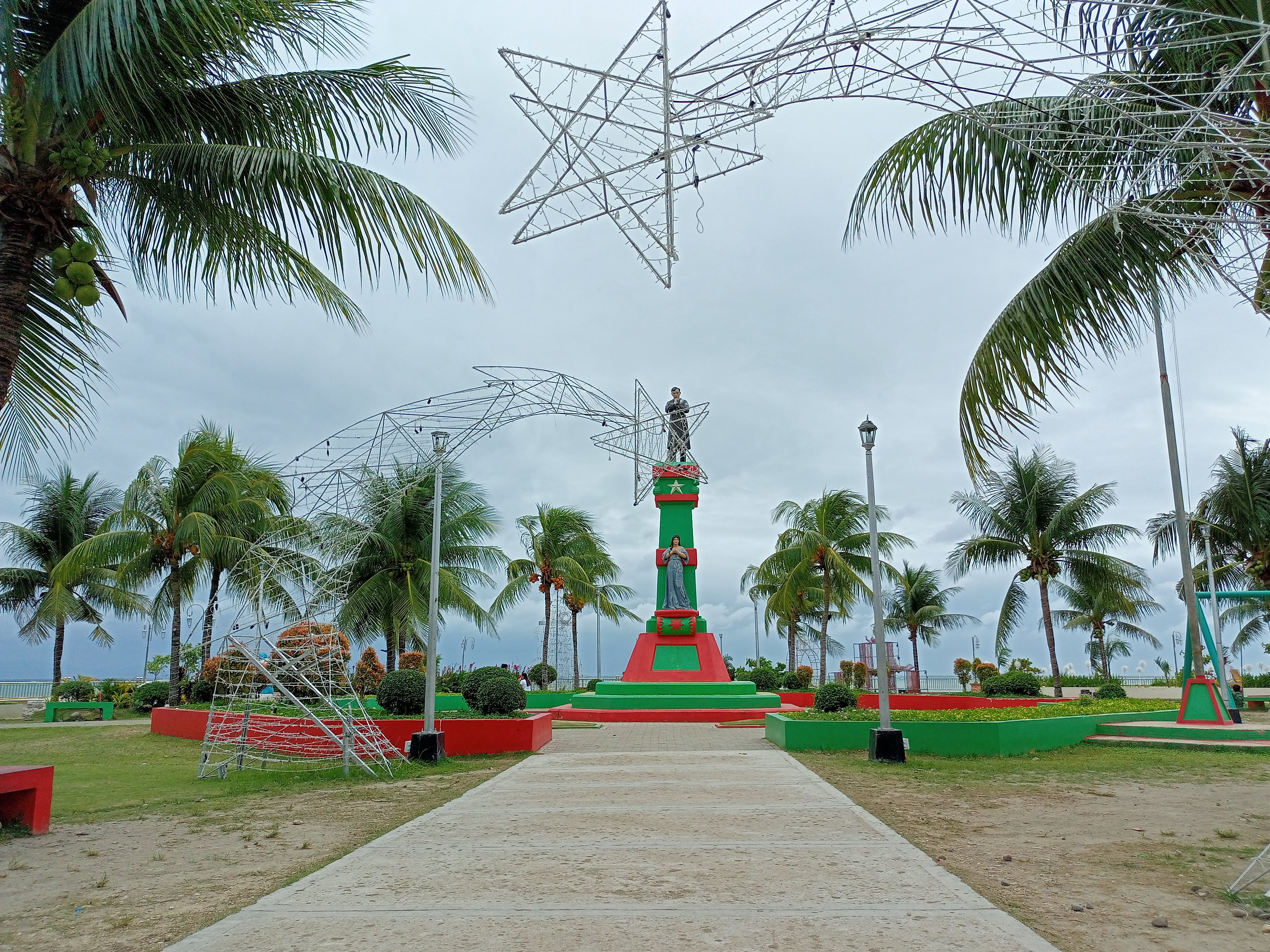
Guihulngan Rizal Freedom Park grandstand

A huge bell with a Carabao was served as the main attraction of the city located at the side of Justice Hall along the National Highway.

=== Festival ===
Cara-Bell Festival (Every May 24) – Legend has it that marauding pirates used to slaughter natives of the town and drop their corpses into the sea. Guihulugan Festival of Guihulngan is usually celebrated on May 24. This festival is also referred to as the Cara-Bell Festival because of a story about a bell that saved the lives of the natives. According to some legends of the olden days, Moro pirates sailed the lands of Negros Oriental.

== Education ==
Negros Oriental State University, the only state university in the province of Negros Oriental has a satellite campus in the city. It is known as the Guihulngan City Campus.

Saint Francis College – Guihulngan (SFC-G) is a private institution located in Bateria, Guihulngan, Negros Oriental. Inspired by the Charism of Saint Francis of Assisi, it was founded by three Franciscan friars.

The public schools in Guihulngan are administered by the Schools Division of Guihulngan City.

=== High schools ===
- Balogo National High School — Balogo
- Buenavista National High School — Buenavista
- Guihulngan National Agricultural School — Plagatasanon
- Guihulngan National High School-Poblacion — Osmeña Avenue, Poblacion
- Guihulngan NHS-Binobohan Annex — Binobohan
- Guihulngan NHS-Lip-o Extension — Sitio Lip-o, Imelda
- Guihulngan NHS-Maculos Extension — Sitio Maculos, Bulado
- Guihulngan NHS-Hilaitan — Hilaitan
- Guihulngan NHS-Hibaiyo Annex — Hibaiyo
- Linantuyan National High School — Linantuyan
- Magsaysay National High School — Magsaysay
- Maximina Lim Tabilon High School — Calupa-an
- P. Zamora National High School — Padre Zamora
- Planas National High School — Planas
- Sandayao National High School — Sandayao
- Trinidad High School — Trinidad

=== Private schools ===
- Saint Francis College - Guihulngan — Nat'l Highway, Bateria, Poblacion
- Kiddieville Learning Center, Inc. — Hilaitan
- Guihulngan Christian School Inc. — Larena Street, Poblacion
- ABC Learning Center - Guihulngan, Inc. — Bateria, Poblacion
