= List of places named after places in the Philippines =

The list of places named after places in the Philippines identifies namesake places and the eponymic Philippine place for which they are named.

Places named for Philippine places
namesake	area	eponym	area
Ambaguio	Nueva Vizcaya	Baguio	Cordillera
Bacolod-Kalawi	Lanao del Sur	Bacolod	Lanao del Norte
Cagayancillo	Palawan	Cagayan (province)	Luzon
Calamba	Misamis Occidental	Calamba	Laguna
New Bataan	Davao de Oro	Bataan (province)	Luzon
New Corella	Davao del Norte	Corella	Bohol
Pililla	Rizal	Pila	Laguna
Tagoloan II	Lanao del Sur	Tagoloan	Lanao del Norte
Zamboanguita	Negros Oriental	Zamboanga	Zamboanga Peninsula
