= Apo Island =

Volcanic island in Visayas, Philippines

- Barangay
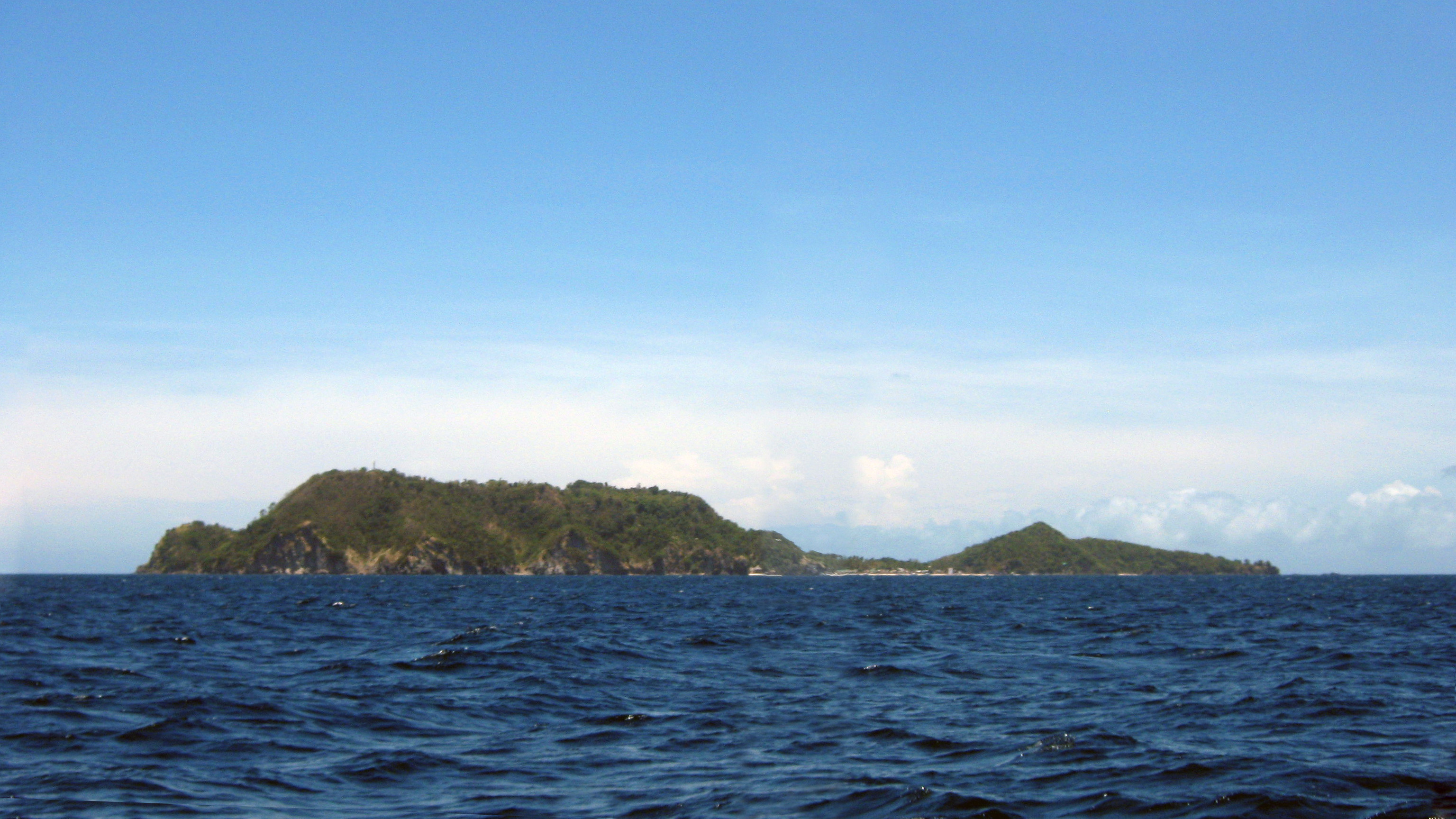
- View of Apo Island from the west

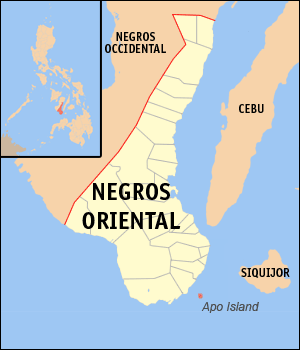
- Map of Negros Oriental showing the location of Apo Island.
- Interactive map of Apo Island
- Coordinates: 9°4′N 123°16′E
- Country: Philippines
- Island group: Visayas
- Region: Negros Island Region
- Province: Negros Oriental
- Municipality: Dauin

Area
  - Total: 0.74 km^{2} (0.29 sq mi)

Population (2007)
  - Total: 745
  - Density: 1,000/km^{2} (2,600/sq mi)
- Time zone: UTC+8 (PST)
- Zip code: 6217
- Area code: 35

Apo Island /ˈæpoʊ/ is a volcanic island covering 74 hectares in land area, 7 kilometers off the southeastern tip of Negros Island and 30 kilometers south of the Negros Oriental capital of Dumaguete in the Philippines. The name "Apo" means "elder" or "respected ancestor" in the Visayan languages.

The marine habitat around the island is a marine reserve, protected by the National Integrated Protected Area Act (NIPA) and under the jurisdiction of the Protected Area Management Board (PAMB). It has become a popular dive site and snorkeling destination with tourists. There are two resorts on Apo Island, each with a dive center: Apo Island Beach Resort and Liberty's Lodge. There is also a ranger station and a lighthouse.

The island is under the jurisdiction of the municipality of Dauin, Negros Oriental, and is one of the municipality's 23 barangays. As of the 2010 census, the island has a population of 918.

== Geography ==
Apo Island is located off the southeastern tip of Negros Island, 7 kilometers from the town of Zamboanguita, and 25 kilometers south of the Negros Oriental capital Dumaguete. Extending approximately 1.5 km (0.9 mi) from north to south and 1 km (0.6 mi) from east to west, the island has a land area of approximately 74 hectares and rises to a height of 120 meters (390 feet) above sea level at its highest point.

It can be reached by a 30-minute motorized boat ride from the village of Malatapay, Zamboanguita, Negros Oriental.

== Marine sanctuary and tourism ==
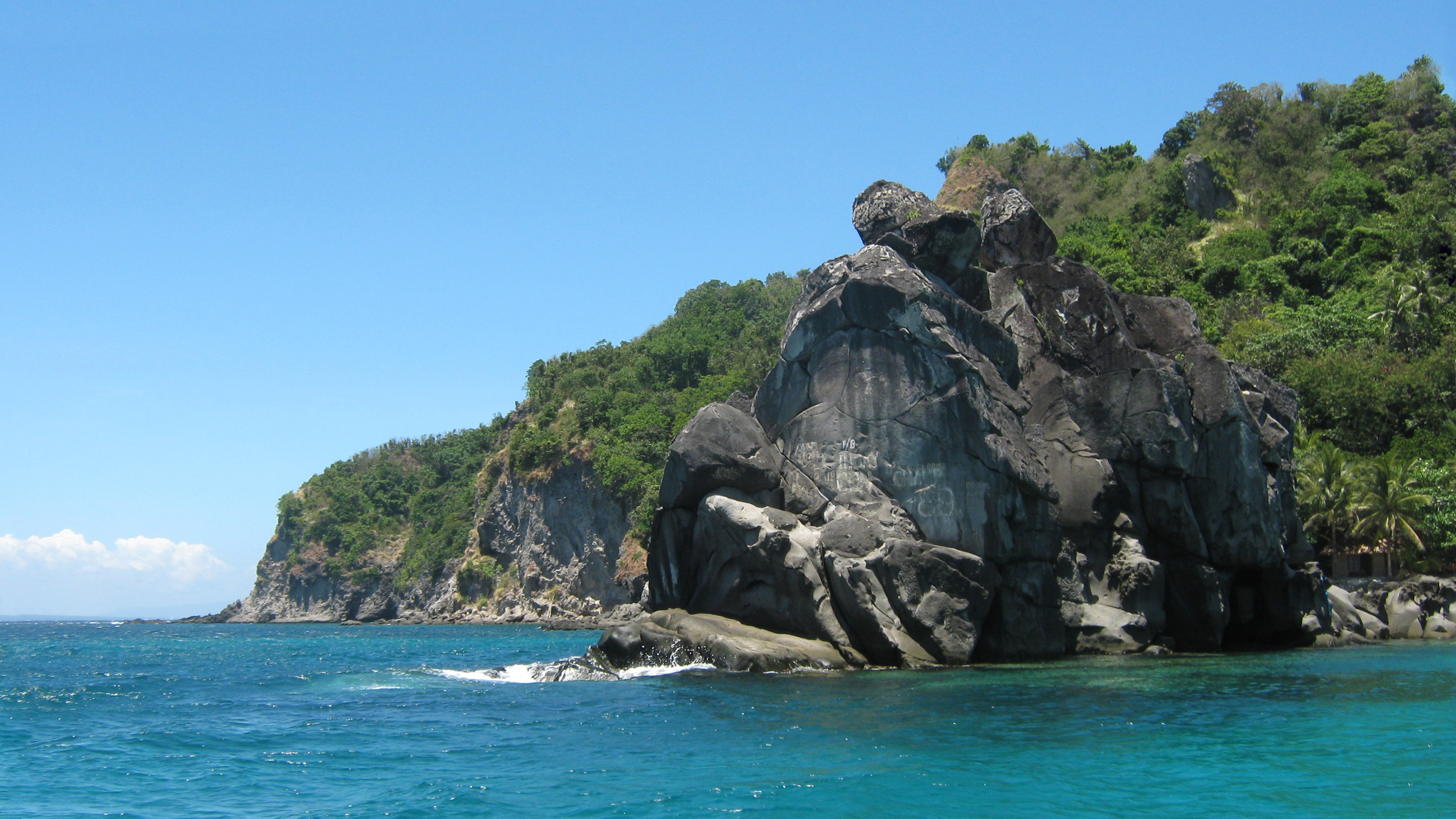
Rock formations at the boat landing area.

Apo Island has a community-organized marine sanctuaries, and as such it has been well documented by the global science community. The project was started when Dr. Angel Alcala, a marine scientist from the Silliman University Marine Laboratory introduced to the local fishermen the importance of creating a marine sanctuary in the area. Initially, there was hesitation on the part of the locals, but after a three-year dialogue, Dr. Alcala convinced the island community to establish the sanctuary. Assisted by the staff of the SU Marine Laboratory in 1982, the local fishermen selected an area along 450 meters of shoreline and extending 500 meters from shore as the sanctuary site. Since then, the project initiated on the island led to the creation of hundreds of other marine sanctuaries in the Philippines.

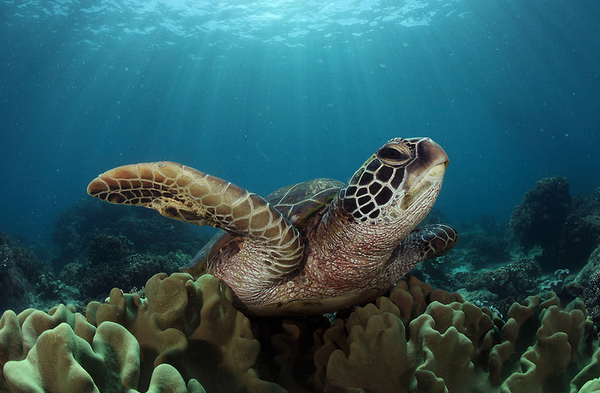
Sea Turtle taken at 5M depth Apo Island

At present, the island is home to over 650 documented species of fish and estimated to have over 400 species of corals. Most of the Philippines' 450 species of coral can be found here, from tiny bubble corals to huge gorgonian sea fans and brain corals. Visitors and tourists pay a fee to enter Apo Island and to snorkel or dive in the marine sanctuary there. These fees are used to keep the sanctuary clean and in good condition.

In 2003, Chicago's Shedd Aquarium opened a Wild Reef exhibit based on Apo Island's surrounding reef and marine sanctuary. In 2008, Sport Diver Magazine listed Apo Island as one of the top 100 diving spots in the world.

The fish sanctuary, at the southeastern part of the island has been closed "temporarily" since 2011 after it got devastated by typhoon Sendong. This beach is indeed facing the ocean and is now banned from snorkeling and the place is now used to park fishing boats. Though the island is not a marine reserve, only the local population have the right to catch fish. The main advantages on the island is indeed the facilities for diving residing on the island (with tanks and compressors) and the protection of sea turtles where more than 60 are recorded, and an amazing diversity of soft and hard corals. In the north part of the island, currents offer exceptionally clear waters with a school of jacks, 13 barracudas, few groupers located near Coconut diving spot.

== See also ==
- List of protected areas of the Philippines
