= Bob Halstead =

British scuba diver (1944–2018)

- Bob Halstead
- Born: 24 October 1944; London, England
- Died: 18 December 2018 (aged 74)
- Known for: Underwater photography, diving publications, dive industry entrepreneurship, diving commentary
- Awards: International Scuba Diving Hall of Fame, 2008

Bob Halstead (24 October 1944 – 18 December 2018), has made significant contributions to the sport of scuba diving in a multitude of capacities: photographer, author of eight diving books, early innovator in the development of dive tourism, pioneer in the dive liveaboard industry, diving instructor and educator, marine-life explorer and influential diving industry commentator. An ardent diver since 1968, Halstead has over 10,000 logged dives.

== Background ==
As a teenager in England, Halstead became fascinated by the underwater adventures of Hans and Lotte Hass. In 1968, armed with an honours degree from King's College London University in physics/mathematics and a postgraduate certificate in education, Halstead departed England for a teaching post as head of the Physics Department at Queen's College Nassau, Bahamas where he immediately learned to dive, fell in love with diving adventure, and bought an underwater camera.

In 1970 Halstead became a NAUI instructor (# 2000) at Freeport, Grand Bahama. In 1973 he moved to Papua New Guinea and started a systematic exploration of its reefs and wrecks that continues to this day. Halstead, with his diver ex-wife Dinah, formed PNG's first full-time sport diving business in 1977 with a dive shop and school in Port Moresby and ran adventurous "Camp and Dive Safaris" in Milne Bay Province, from their dive boat Solatai, starting the promotion of organized dive tourism to PNG.

A celebrated underwater photographer, Halstead has won many awards, including the Australasian Underwater Photographer of the Year award in 1983. In 1986, he started the first PNG live-aboard dive boat operation, Telita Cruises with the 20m dive charter vessel, Telita, a boat built in PNG to his specifications and under Halstead's personal supervision. This pioneering vessel, with Halstead as captain, was the first to explore and promote many of the diving sites now popular with diving visitors to PNG.

The areas he loves best are those marked on the charts "Caution, Un-surveyed." Halstead has led sport diving, filming and scientific expeditions exploring underwater all the coastal regions of PNG, and made over 10,000 dives in the process including as consultant to the Cousteau Society, the BBC, National Geographic and the late Eugene Clark of the Maryland Foundation and Mote Marine Laboratory.

Halstead has discovered several marine species new to science. A Sand Diver fish, Trichonotus halstead, was named after Halstead and ex-wife Dinah in 1996, and Halstead has a new species of Razor fish named after him, Novaculops halsteadi.

"Muck Diving", now a diving genre, is a phrase coined by Halstead to describe dives he led in less attractive environments searching for exotic creatures. He also introduced tourists to diving with living nautilus, when this was previously the sole realm of scientists. In 2004, already a NAUI instructor for more than 30 years, and more than twice the age of the next younger candidate, Halstead successfully completed a full PADI Instructor Course.

Halstead has published 8 books on diving and marine life, chapters in several other books, and hundreds of magazine stories on diving safety, marine life and PNG dive sites, characterized by fine photography, thoughtful messages and a sense of humor. His best known articles extol the difference between "Risk" and "Danger" and emphasize the importance of self-sufficiency in diving skills, knowledge and equipment. Halstead's Coral Sea Reef Guide – a book which has achieved iconic status in the region – provides divers with a beautifully illustrated reference to most of the fishes and invertebrates that divers are likely to encounter in the Coral Sea region which includes the Great Barrier Reef, PNG, Solomon Islands, Vanuatu and New Caledonia.

Classical music has been a lifelong love and Halstead failed to learn to play the trumpet, trombone and euphonium, before discovering the saxophone. He finds it useful in getting reluctant divers into the water by promising a practice session. In 2008 he presented the multi-media "Reef Reverie" to celebrate the Year of the Coral Reef at the Hilton Hotel Cairns. This was a live presentation of Halstead's images projected on a large screen, cued by Halstead from the score of a specially commissioned work of modern classical music composed by Ross Carey.In 2008 Halstead was inducted into the International Scuba Diving Hall of Fame.

In 2014 he released an App for iPhone, iPad and Android - Bob Halstead's Coral Sea Fish Guide App. With more than 850 marine species featured and over 2000 high-quality colour photographs, Bob Halstead's Coral Sea Fish Guide provides the easiest and most interesting way for reef lovers, snorkelers and scuba divers to identify and learn about the diverse and amazing fish life of the Coral Sea area and beyond. For convenience, the guide also includes some common reptiles, mammals and mysterious invertebrates. For more information on this new App see the App page.

He now lives in Cairns, Australia, spending his time writing about Scuba Diving and guiding special diving adventures to PNG and the Coral Sea on private vessels and on the top PNG dive vessels. His favorite dives are still those that others have not yet dived.

On 1 July 2017, after a long courtship and partnership, he married the love of his life, concert violinist Kirtley Leigh, who is also a superb diver (the last student Halstead taught to dive), and Underwater Model. Halstead and Kirtley Leigh developed an outstanding partnership working together underwater as photographer and model, and their collaboration produced images which have to date graced some 20 international magazine covers.

== Education ==
Halstead has a scientific background, having studied both Physics and Mathematics at university level. He earned his degree in physics from the King's College London, and then went on to take a post-graduate degree in Education at Bristol University. He continued his academic path by taking the position of head of the Physics Department at Queens College, Nassau in 1968. It was in the Bahamas that Halstead fell in love with the undersea world. By 1970 he had advanced his diving qualifications to the level of Instructor with NAUI. In 1973 he moved on to take an educational post with the Australian Government, taking a post as head of the Science Department at the Sogen National High School Papua New Guinea (PNG).

== Career ==
=== Teaching – science and scuba ===
Halstead's career made a steady transition from full-time science teacher and educator and part-time scuba instructor, to one of a totally dedicated dive journalist, author, and underwater photographer after his original career of science educator took him to Papua New Guinea in the early 1970s. Halstead had arrived in a diver's paradise, but at this time hardly anything was known of the dive sites of the region, and certainly no real diving infrastructure existed to allow other divers to enjoy what the region had to offer. Halstead set out to change all this.

=== Pioneer in the dive travel industry ===
With his first wife, he began a major program to explore and categorise the many uncharted and untouched dive sites of the region, all the time with camera in hand to capture images of these stunning locations. In 1977 Halstead harnessed this knowledge as he established the very first diving and training center for the area in Port Moresby. Halstead and his then wife also purchased and fitted out the regions first dive boat - the Solatai. The Halsteads were at the forefront of defining the formula for what would become organized dive tourism - the diver service industry that opens up access to a world of diving locations for the population of scuba divers today. Halstead's approach was a "diving camp" and "Diver adventure safaris" through his company Tropical Diving Adventures.

As dive tourism developed into the first "live-aboard" operations in the Aggressor Fleet (1984) and in Mike Ball Expeditions (1981), Halstead went on to commission and build the first live-aboard vessel for PNG - the dive cruiser Telita. He then sold his business interests ashore to concentrate in this expanding new live-aboard business area and spent the next ten years helping to make New Guinea one of the world premier dive locations. Halstead and his ex-wife actually made the Telita their home in this period.

=== Photography and marine research ===
Halstead has won a number of gold medals for his photography, both above and below the surface of the sea. His published photographs are some of the most striking images of the underwater world. Through his interest in both underwater photography and marine life Halstead began a lifetime focus on the study and photography of marine creatures that resided in the sediment on the ocean floor - and he defined and propagated the practise of what he himself named "muck diving", which has become a significant sub-practise in the general field of underwater photography.

Halstead was involved in a number of scientific expeditions in PNG, including ones carried out for the Cousteau Society and National Geographic. In the explorations carried out in the general area of marine biology he identified several new and unknown species of marine life, which later were named after him: Trichonotus halstead and Xyrichtys halsteadi. In 1996 Halstead sold his business interests in PNG and focussed more on his marine exploration and photography pursuits and to take up residence in Cairns Australia.

=== Publishing ===
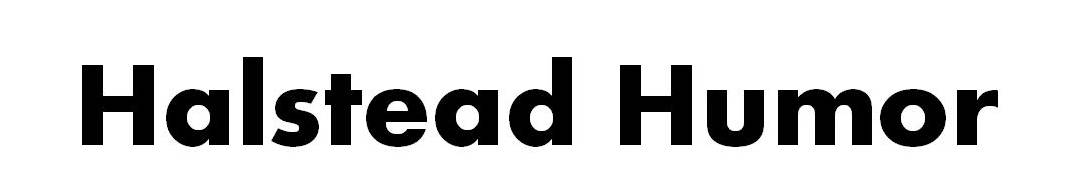
Although noted for serious and insightful analysis of diving practises, much of Halstead's writing is also noted for some of its sidesplitting humor. A few quotes: "Never Dive Deeper Than Your IQ (Imperial units)" "If I do not log my sex life, why should I log my dive life?" "Safe diving, from my personal experience, involves avoiding other divers underwater as much as possible" "As soon as you step near a full scuba cylinder you are at risk... every step that you take getting to, on and into the water increases that risk" "If you can't take a joke, do not take up underwater photography"

Halstead is one of the dive industry's most prolific journalists. He has published hundreds of articles in numerous dive magazines and is a steady contributor to Undercurrent, one of the dive industries most noted and fiercely independent scuba journals. His writing style is highly readable and good-humoured, but he never shies away from controversial subjects.

Halstead is particularly noted for his very well thought out and insightful views on diving practices, particularly as they relate to diving risk and diver safety. His contributions in these areas has done much to change the face of present-day diving practise, particularly with respect to altering attitudes about questionable buddy diving practises, and in the destigmatizing the practise of solo diving. He was an early proponent and spokesperson on the subject of diver self-sufficiency, a concept that has moved into mainstream thinking in scuba diving practise.

== Certifications ==
=== Diving instructor ===
- NAUI - 1970
- PADI - 2004

== Awards ==
- Australasian Underwater Photographer of the year award, 1983
- "Telita" voted "Best Live-aboard Dive Boat in the World" 1992, In Depth Magazine
- Inducted into the International Scuba Diving Hall of Fame, 2008

== Select publications ==
Books

- Coral Sea Reef Guide Hardcover. Sea Challengers Natural History. 2000. ISBN 0-9700574-0-7.
- Diving & Snorkeling Papua New Guinea. Lonely Planet Publications. 1999. ISBN 0-86442-776-X.
- Diving Papua New Guinea Hardcover. Air Niugini, Port Moresby. 1994.
- M/V TELITA & MINISUB (in Paradise) Hardcover. Air Niugini. 1987.
- Asian Diver Scuba Guide to Papua New Guinea –. Asian Diver. 1996.
- Great Barrier Reef. Souvenir Books. 1999. ISBN 97806-4628-2480.
- Tropical Diving Adventures –. Robert Brown. 1977. ISBN 0-909093-18-0.
- The Coral Reefs of Papua New Guinea –. Adventures S.r.l. 1998.

Article publications

- Skin Diver Magazine
- Paradise Magazine (PNG)
- Sportdiving
- Undercurrent
- Journal of the South Pacific Underwater
- Medicine Society and Scuba Diver (Australia)
- Ocean Realm Magazine
- Scuba Times
- Tauchen Magazine (Germany)
- Asian Diver
- The Australasian Dive Log
