= Saint Francis College – Guihulngan =

Private college in Negros Oriental, Philippines

Saint Francis College, Guihulngan, Negros Oriental, Incorporated.
- Type: Private, Non-stock, Coeducational
- Established: October 4, 1962
- President: Fr. Jumil J. Alcasoda, OFM (School Director)
- Location: (Philippines) Guihulngan, Negros Oriental, Philippines; 10°07′39″N 123°16′24″E
- Website: saintfranciscollegeguihulngan.weebly.com
- Location in the Visayas Location in the Philippines

Saint Francis College, Guihulngan, Negros Oriental, Incorporated. (also known as SFCGNOI) is a private educational institution located in Bateria, Guihulngan City, Negros Oriental, Philippines. Inspired by the Charism of Saint Francis of Assisi, three Franciscan friars including Brother Norbert Binder, Fr. Kiernan Jay Kilroy, and Fr. Bruno Hicks founded and first managed the school.
