= Muck diving =

Recreational diving on a loose sedimentary bottom

Muck diving is recreational diving on a loose sedimentary bottom, usually in relatively low visibility. It gets its name from the sediment that lies on the bottom at many dive sites - a frequently muddy or "mucky" environment. Other than muddy sediment, the muck dive substrate may consist of dead coral skeletons, garbage and natural detritus. The visibility is usually less than on the reef or wreck sites of the area. However, the sediment and detritus environment has a different ecology to the reef, and the "muck" substrate can be the habitat for unusual, exotic and juvenile organisms that are not found in the cleaner reef sites of the region.

== History ==
The term muck diving was first recorded as being used by Bob Halstead to describe diving off the beaches made up of black sand in Milne Bay, Papua New Guinea.

== Why people muck dive ==
The "muck" substrate can be the habitat for unusual, exotic and juvenile organisms that make their homes in the sediment and "trash" that compose a muck dive. The sediment and detritus environment has a different ecology to the reef. Creatures like colorful nudibranchs, anglerfish, shrimp, blue-ringed octopus, and rare pygmy seahorses may be more common, more easily found, or restricted to a sedimentary substrate.

== Where people muck dive ==
The most publicised region for muck diving is Southeast Asia, where there are more marine species than anywhere else in the world. Places like Mabul and Kapalai in Sabah, Malaysia, Anilao and Dauin in the Philippines, Lembeh Straits in Manado, Indonesia and Bali are popular because of the different creatures found in this type of bottom ecology.

Other sedimentary bottom habitats may also provide interesting ecologies, and muck diving is possible almost anywhere that recreational diving is possible.

== Skills and equipment ==
The equipment used is mostly standard recreational diving equipment appropriate for the region and planned dive profile, Photographic equipment is usually for macro-photography, and good buoyancy skills are highly desirable to avoid disturbing the silt, which ruins the visibility and can impact on the infauna.
