= Dauin =

Municipality in Negros Oriental, Philippines

- Municipality
- Municipality of Dauin
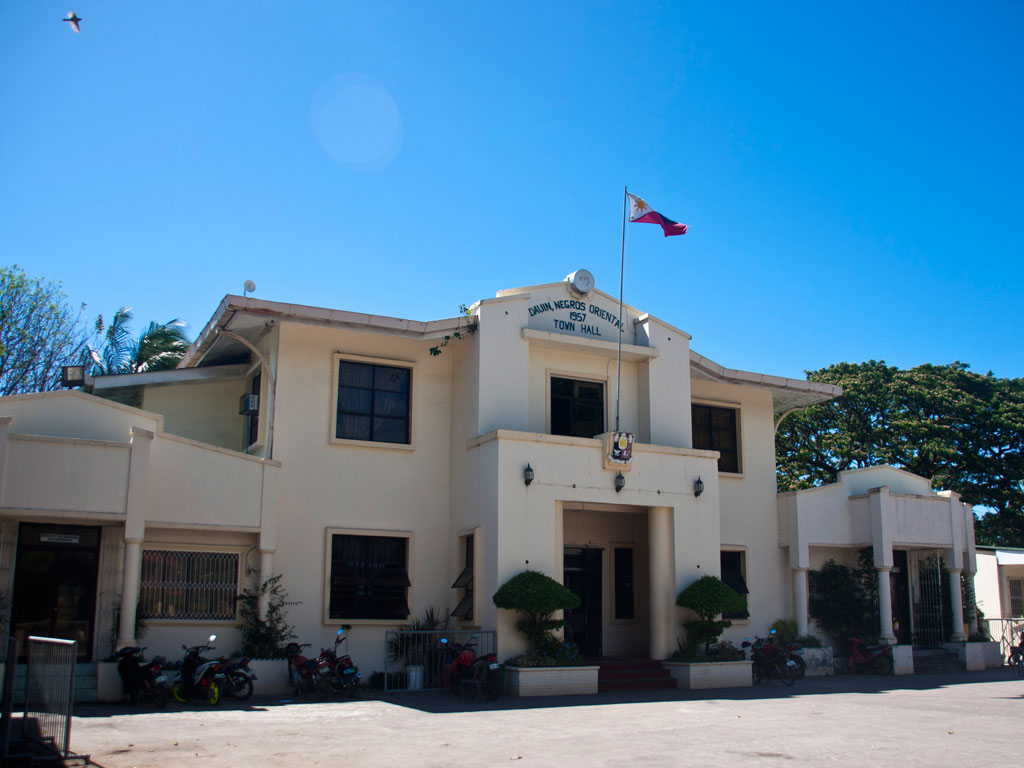
- Apo Island Marine Sanctuary Municipal Hall Saint Nicholas of Tolentino Parish Church

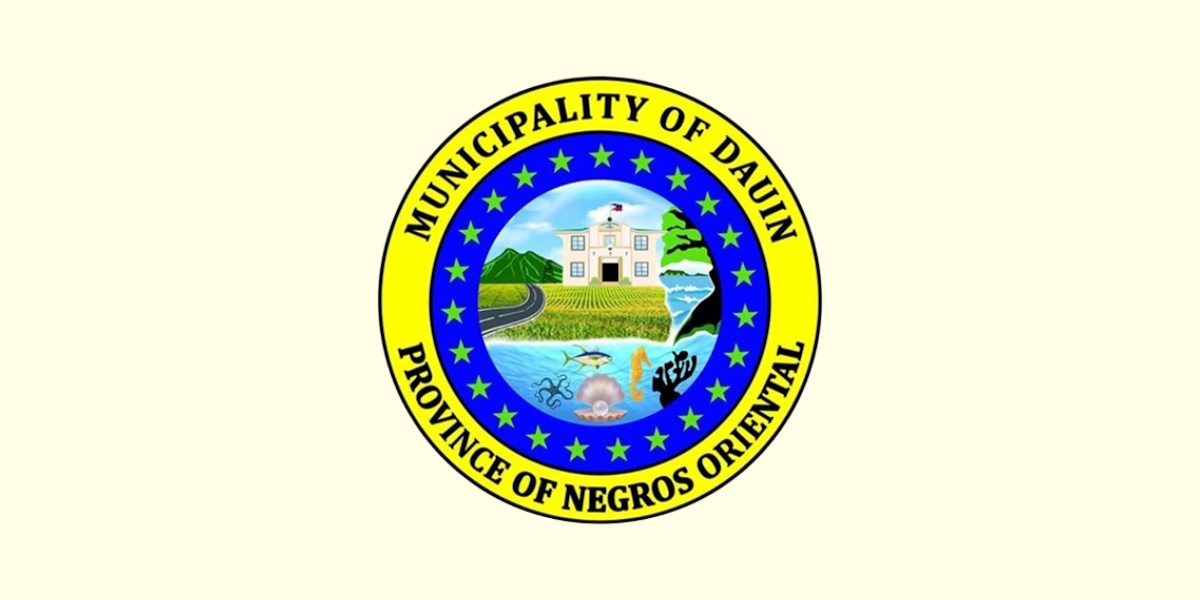
- Flag
- Nickname: "The Resort Capital of Negros Oriental
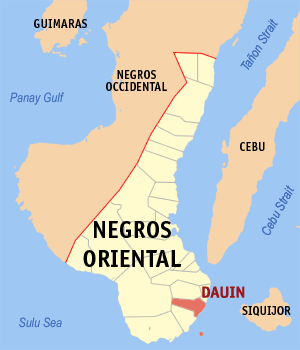
- Map of Negros Oriental with Dauin highlighted
- Interactive map of Dauin
- Location within the Philippines
- Coordinates: 9°12′N 123°16′E
- Country: Philippines
- Region: Negros Island Region
- Province: Negros Oriental
- District: 3rd district
- Founded: January 13, 1908
- Barangays: 23 (see Barangays)

Government
  - Type: Sangguniang Bayan
  - Mayor: Galicano A. Truita (PFP)
  - Vice Mayor: Alvin V. Truita (PFP)
  - Representative: Janice Degamo (Lakas)
  - Municipal Council: Members: Jonah D. Alar; Christopher James S. Solamillo; Lucille L. Credo; Edmond T. Pagbonocan; Howard A. Enriquez; Nelson T. Bandoles; Analisa A. Tinaco; Prince Carl T. Baga; Mario T. Pascobello ^{‡}; Siena Truita ^{◌}; ‡ ex officio ABC president; ◌ ex officio SK chairman
  - Electorate: 22,121 voters (2025)

Area
  - Total: 114.10 km^{2} (44.05 sq mi)
- Elevation: 66 m (217 ft)
- Highest elevation: 545 m (1,788 ft)
- Lowest elevation: 0 m (0 ft)

Population (2024 census)
  - Total: 30,921
  - Density: 271.00/km^{2} (701.88/sq mi)
  - Households: 7,221

Economy
  - Income class: 2nd municipal income class
  - Poverty incidence: 29.64% (2023)
  - Revenue: ₱ 196.8 million (2024)
  - Assets: ₱ 728.9 million (2024)
  - Expenditure: ₱ 112.5 million (2024)
  - Liabilities: ₱ 341.7 million (2024)

Service provider
  - Electricity: Negros Oriental 2 Electric Cooperative (NORECO 2)
- Time zone: UTC+8 (PST)
- ZIP code: 6217
- PSGC: 1804609000
- IDD : area code: +63 (0)35
- Native languages: Cebuano; Tagalog

Dauin, officially the Municipality of Dauin (Cebuano: Lungsod sa Dauin; Tagalog: Bayan ng Dauin) is a municipality in the province of Negros Oriental, Philippines. According to the 2024 census, it has a population of 30,921 people.

== History ==
The municipality was created on January 13, 1908, through Executive Order No. 37.

== Geography ==
It is bordered on the north by Bacong and Valencia, on the south by Zamboanguita, and on the west a mountain range separates it from Santa Catalina. The municipality is a coastal town, the Bohol Sea forming its eastern border.

Dauin is 16 kilometres (9.9 mi) from Dumaguete.

=== Barangays ===
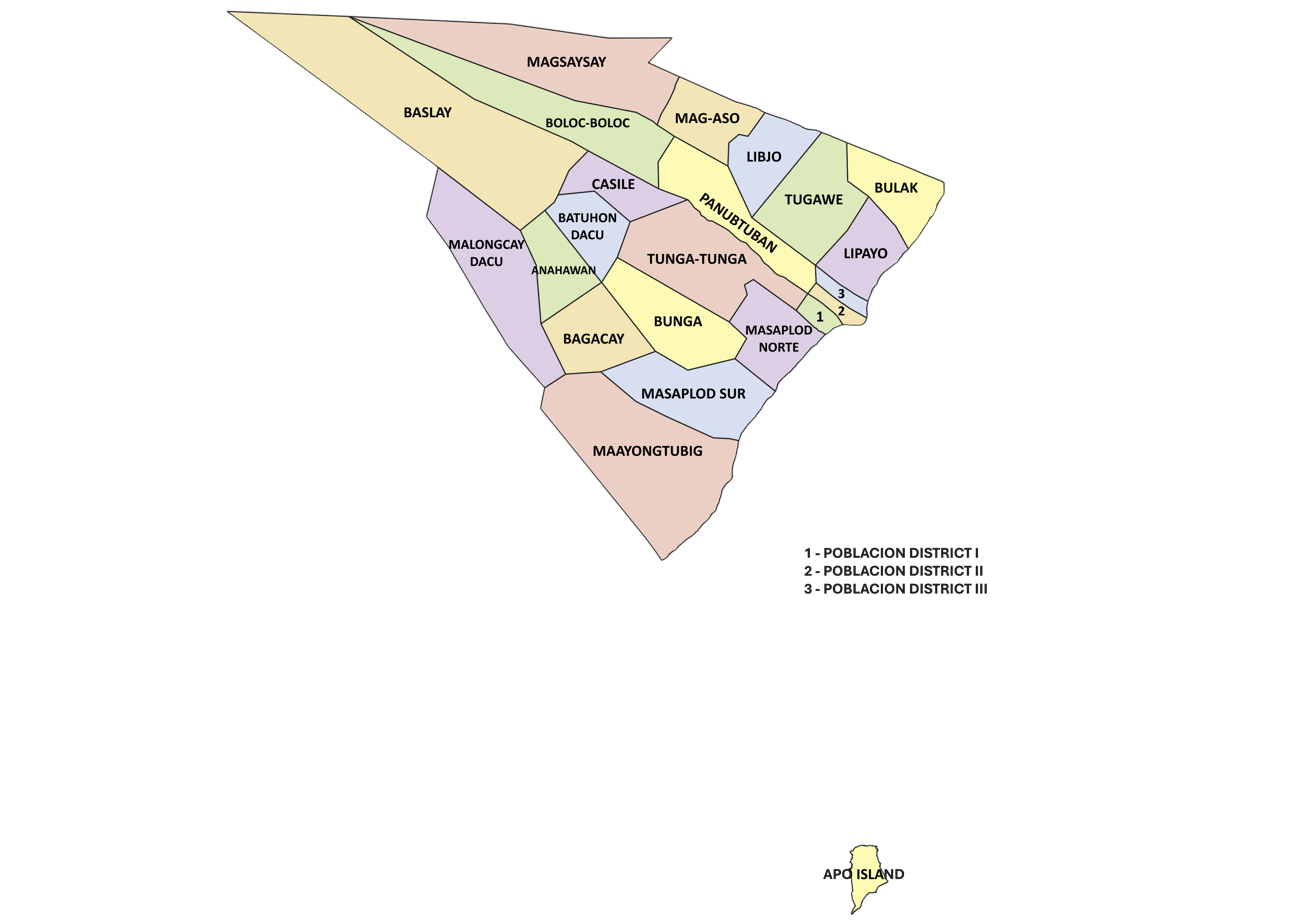
Political map of Dauin

Dauin is politically subdivided into 23 barangays. Each barangay consists of puroks and some have sitios.

PSGC	Barangay	Population			±% p.a.	
		2024		2010		
074609001	Anhawan	1.5%	450	463	▾	−0.20%
074609002	Apo Island	3.0%	920	918	▴	0.01%
074609003	Bagacay	2.9%	898	759	▴	1.16%
074609004	Baslay	2.7%	838	621	▴	2.08%
074609005	Batuhon Dacu	2.0%	603	545	▴	0.70%
074609006	Boloc-boloc	2.5%	772	652	▴	1.17%
074609007	Bulak	5.9%	1,829	1,349	▴	2.12%
074609008	Bunga	2.9%	886	811	▴	0.61%
074609009	Casile	2.8%	866	718	▴	1.30%
074609010	Libjo	2.6%	793	595	▴	2.00%
074609011	Lipayo	9.7%	2,997	2,331	▴	1.75%
074609012	Maayongtubig	12.4%	3,846	3,115	▴	1.46%
074609013	Mag-aso	2.9%	887	785	▴	0.84%
074609014	Magsaysay	4.2%	1,305	1,211	▴	0.52%
074609015	Malongcay Dacu	4.1%	1,283	1,128	▴	0.89%
074609016	Masaplod Norte	4.9%	1,504	1,259	▴	1.23%
074609017	Masaplod Sur	5.6%	1,720	1,461	▴	1.13%
074609018	Panubtuban	3.3%	1,033	887	▴	1.05%
074609019	Poblacion District I	4.7%	1,468	1,351	▴	0.57%
074609020	Poblacion District II	3.8%	1,186	1,183	▴	0.02%
074609021	Poblacion District III	3.2%	980	925	▴	0.40%
074609022	Tugawe	6.1%	1,885	1,470	▴	1.73%
074609023	Tunga-tunga	3.5%	1,069	702	▴	2.94%
	Total		30,921	25,239	▴	1.41%

=== Climate ===
Climate data for Dauin, Negros Oriental
Month	Jan	Feb	Mar	Apr	May	Jun	Jul	Aug	Sep	Oct	Nov	Dec	Year
Mean daily maximum °C (°F)	29 (84)	30 (86)	31 (88)	32 (90)	32 (90)	30 (86)	30 (86)	30 (86)	30 (86)	29 (84)	30 (86)	30 (86)	30 (87)
Mean daily minimum °C (°F)	22 (72)	22 (72)	22 (72)	23 (73)	24 (75)	25 (77)	24 (75)	24 (75)	24 (75)	24 (75)	23 (73)	23 (73)	23 (74)
Average precipitation mm (inches)	26 (1.0)	22 (0.9)	28 (1.1)	41 (1.6)	95 (3.7)	136 (5.4)	147 (5.8)	126 (5.0)	132 (5.2)	150 (5.9)	98 (3.9)	46 (1.8)	1,047 (41.3)
Average rainy days	7.5	6.7	8.9	10.4	21.6	25.6	26.3	25.0	24.1	26.2	19.2	12.1	213.6
Source: Meteoblue (modeled/calculated data, not measured locally)

== Demographics ==
Population census of Dauin
Year	Pop.	±% p.a.
1903	9,224	—
1918	10,356	+0.77%
1939	12,234	+0.80%
1948	11,208	−0.97%
1960	13,175	+1.36%
1970	13,533	+0.27%
1975	14,971	+2.05%
1980	14,992	+0.03%
1990	17,513	+1.57%
1995	19,609	+2.14%
2000	21,077	+1.56%
2007	23,681	+1.62%
2010	25,239	+2.35%
2015	27,786	+1.85%
2020	30,018	+1.64%
2024	30,921	+0.71%
Source: Philippine Statistics Authority

== Economy ==
Poverty incidence of Dauin (%)

Source: Philippine Statistics Authority

== Tourism ==
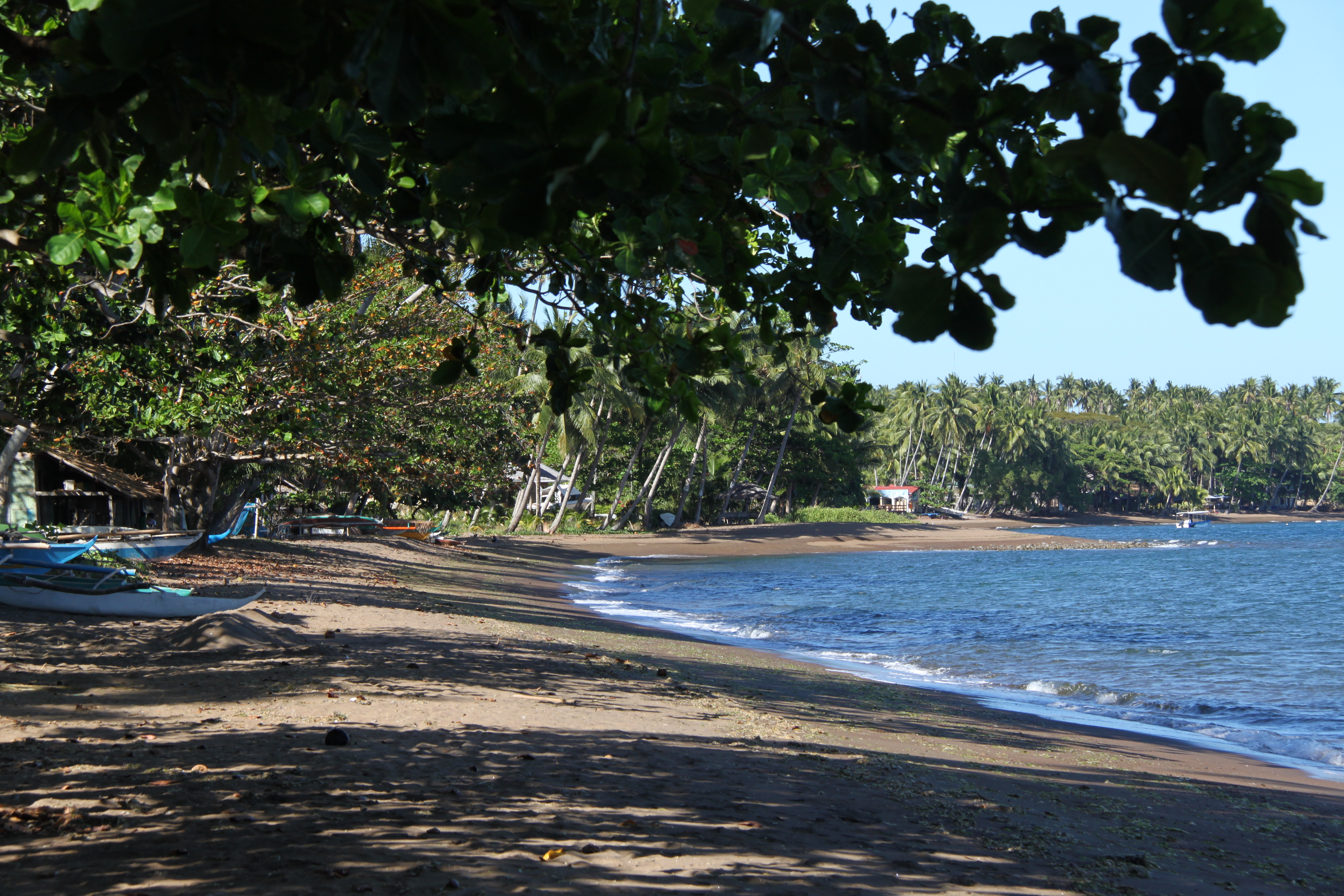
A beachfront in Dauin

Scuba diving is a principle industry in Dauin. Several marine reserves and dive sites are situated along the coast. Apo Island, which is included in the territory of Dauin, is a 72-hectare volcanic outcrop several kilometers off the coast that attracts large numbers of scuba and snorkel enthusiasts.

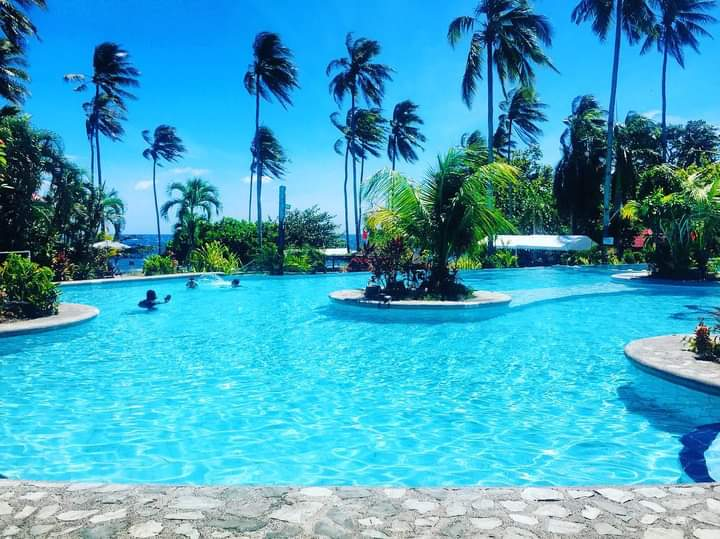
A resort and spa located in Dauin

Some of the province's most popular resorts are situated along Dauin's beaches. Most are focused on diving with regular excursions to Dauin's marine reserves and Apo Island.

Mt Talinis Geothermal Reserve is also included within the territory of Dauin. This reserve includes Mag-Aso and the Malungcay Hot Springs.

Dauin's San Nicolas church is the oldest in the province. In front of the church and along the beach are the ruins of two dome-shaped watchtowers said to have been used to warn against pirates.

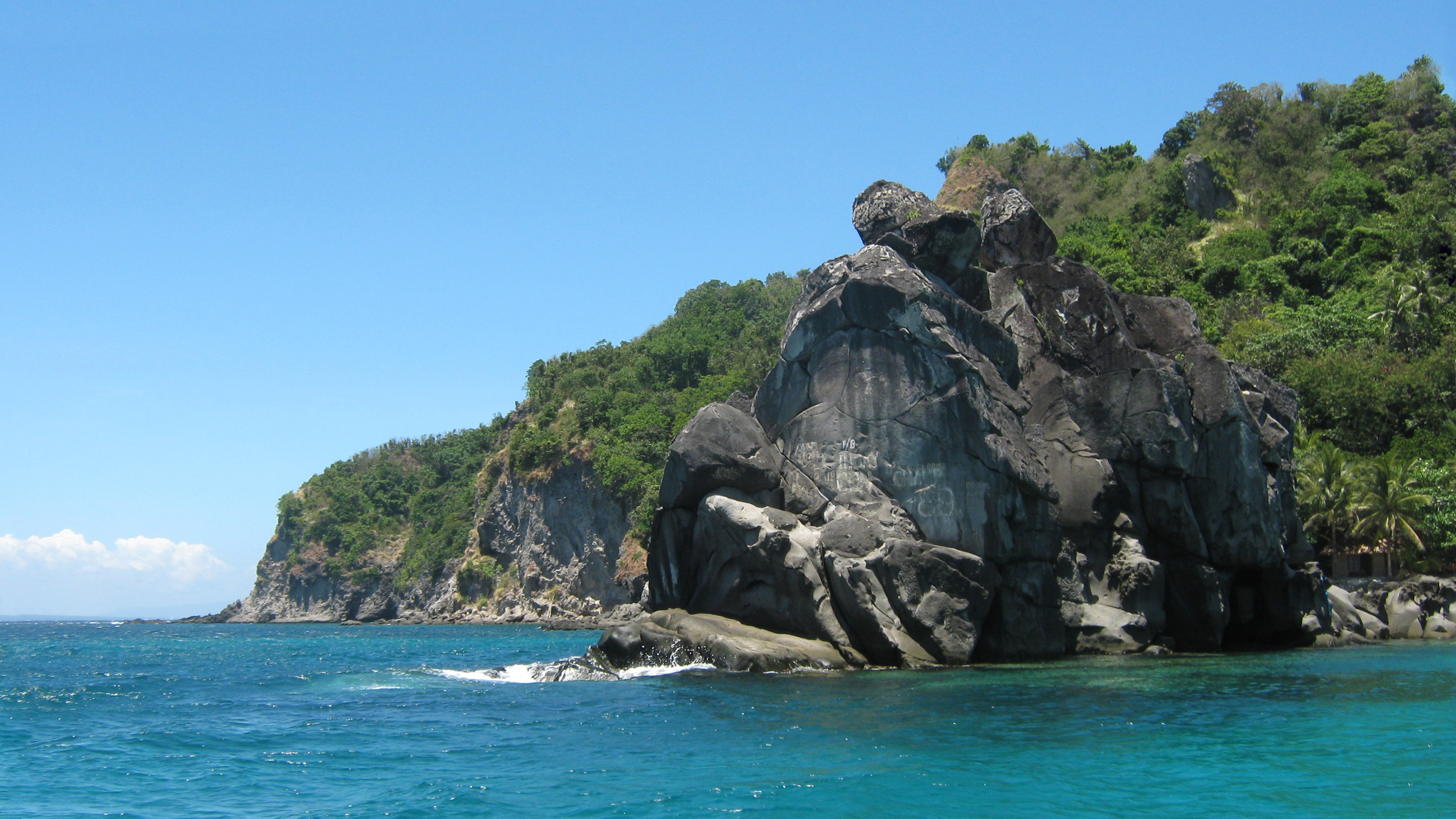
Apo Island

Dauin hosts several popular beach resorts with both local and foreign tourists. The coast of Dauin offers scuba dive sites with both coral reef and muck dive opportunities. The municipality has established several sanctuaries, within which fishing and boating is absolutely prohibited. This includes sites such as Mainit sanctuary, Luca sanctuary, Dauin sanctuary and Masaplod sanctuary. These sites are well preserved and offer a huge variety and quantity of life forms.

Dauin also offers Muck diving, which from a point of view of biodiversity can be compared to the dives in Lembeh Strait in Indonesia. Greater blueringed octopus, Wonderpus, Mimic octopus, Poison ocellate octopus, Ambon scorpionfishes, Flamboyant cuttlefishes, bluespotted stingrays, nudibranchs, and many species of frogfish (most amazing critters in the world) are frequent sights on the sandy shores of the municipality.

Apo Island is part of the jurisdiction of the municipality of Dauin. The island is also a popular site for scuba diving. As it is completely surrounded by coral reefs, the whole island is a dive site. Popular dive sites include Coconut Point, Mamsa, Cogon, Rockpoint and Chapel. Bigeyed Jacks, turtles, bumphead parrotfish and sea snakes are inhabiting the reefs of the island. It is accessible by boat, 30 minutes from the mainland.

Another tourist attraction of Dauin is the Baslay Hot Spring. The hot spring is located in Barangay Baslay. The water from the hot spring contains natural sulphur which is known to have health benefits.

== Education ==
The public schools in the town of Dauin are administered by one school district under the Schools Division of Negros Oriental.

Elementary schools:

- Apo Elementary School — Apo Island
- Bagacay Elementary School — Bagacay
- Baslay Elementary School — Baslay
- Bulak Elementary School — Bulak
- Casile Elementary School — Casile
- Dauin Central School — E. Villanueva Street, Poblacion District II
- Maayongtubig Elementary School — Maayongtubig
- Mag-aso Elementary School — Mag-aso
- Magsaysay Elementary School — Magsaysay
- Malongcay Elementary School — Malongcay Dacu
- Masaplod Elementary School — Masaplod Sur
- Panubtuban Elementary School — Panubtuban
- Tugawe Elementary School — Tugawe

High schools:

- Antonio B. Alejado Memorial High School — Mag-aso
- Apo Island High School — Apo Island
- Apolinar B. Macias Memorial High School — Casile
- Dauin National High School — Bonifacio Street, Poblacion District II
- Dauin Science High School — Bulak
- Froilan A. Alanano Memorial High School — Bunga
- Malongcay Dacu High School — Malongcay Dacu

Private schools:

- Adventist Academy of Negros Oriental-Siquijor, Inc. — Maayongtubig
- One International School Dauin — Maayongtubig
- World Maritime Academy and Training Center — Maayongtubig
