= Zamboanguita =

Municipality in Negros Oriental, Philippines

- Municipality
- Municipality of Zamboanguita
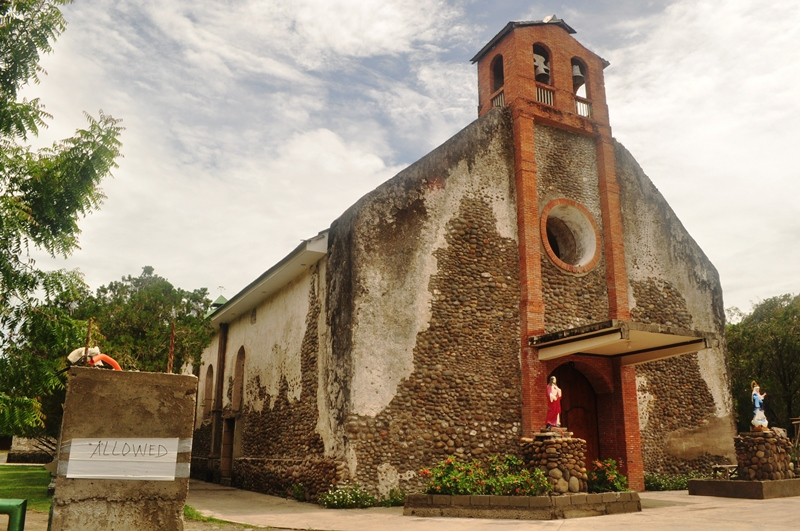
- Zamboanguita Roman Catholic Church

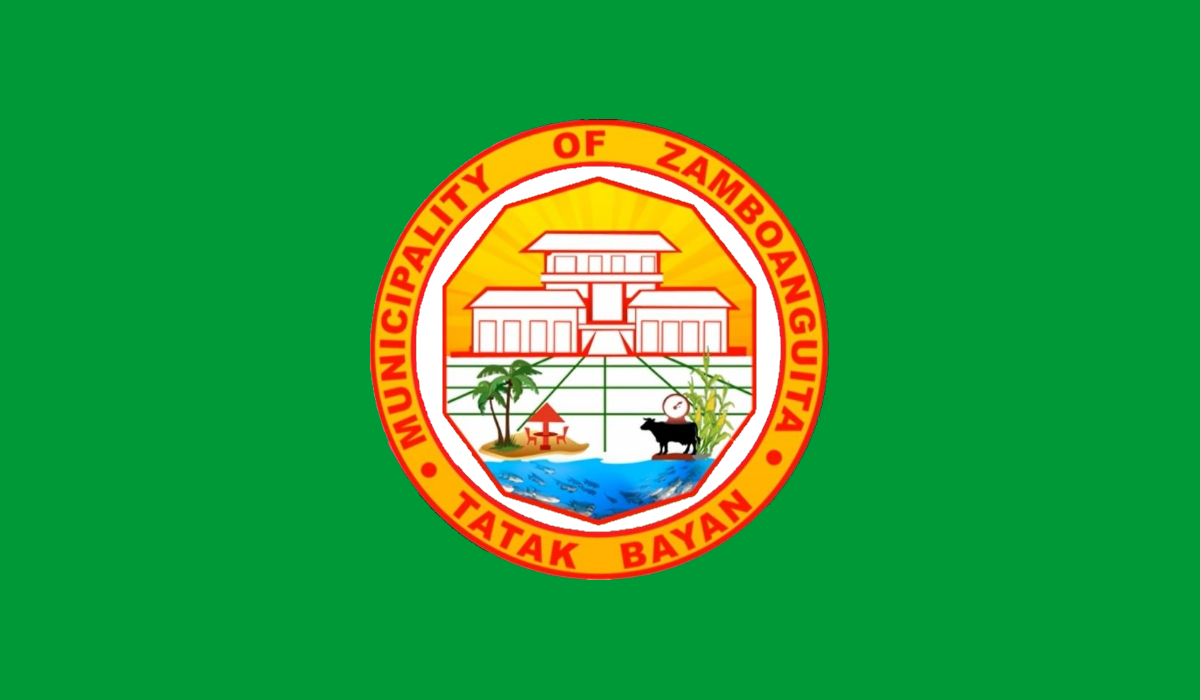
- Flag

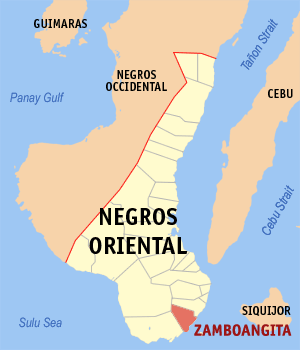
- Map of Negros Oriental with Zamboanguita highlighted
- Interactive map of Zamboanguita
- Location within the Philippines
- Coordinates: 9°06′00″N 123°11′56″E
- Country: Philippines
- Region: Negros Island Region
- Province: Negros Oriental
- District: 3rd district
- Founded: 1866
- Barangays: 10 (see Barangays)

Government
  - Type: Sangguniang Bayan
  - Mayor: Jonah Pat L. Aviles (PFP)
  - Vice Mayor: Felipe Gil U. Elmido, Jr. (PFP)
  - Representative: Janice Degamo (Lakas)
  - Municipal Council: Members: Clint Charles K. Delmo; Felipe T. Elmido, Sr.; Helen A. Partosa; Florenita Trinidad-Elvinia; Clem L. Banua; Desiderio D. Eltanal, Jr.; Benedicto T. Dacara, Jr.; Florante K. Partosa; Romelito Cafino ^{‡}; Jansen Rein B. Dayao ^{◌}; ‡ ex officio ABC president; ◌ ex officio SK chairman
  - Electorate: 20,790 voters (2025)

Area
  - Total: 85.86 km^{2} (33.15 sq mi)
- Elevation: 170 m (560 ft)
- Highest elevation: 1,846 m (6,056 ft)
- Lowest elevation: 0 m (0 ft)

Population (2024 census)
  - Total: 30,412
  - Density: 354.2/km^{2} (917.4/sq mi)
  - Households: 7,532

Economy
  - Income class: 3rd municipal income class
  - Poverty incidence: 24.78% (2023)
  - Revenue: ₱ 163.6 million (2024)
  - Assets: ₱ 487.3 million (2024)
  - Expenditure: ₱ 110.5 million (2024)
  - Liabilities: ₱ 123.2 million (2024)

Service provider
  - Electricity: Negros Oriental 2 Electric Cooperative (NORECO 2)
- Time zone: UTC+8 (PST)
- ZIP code: 6218
- PSGC: 1804625000
- IDD : area code: +63 (0)35
- Native languages: Cebuano; Tagalog

Zamboanguita (Cebuano: Lungsod sa Zamboanguita; Tagalog: Bayan ng Zamboanguita; Spanish: Municipio de Zamboanguita), officially the Municipality of Zamboanguita, is a municipality in the province of Negros Oriental, Philippines. According to the 2024 census, it has a population of 30,412 people.

Zamboanguita was established in 1866. Modest compared to the 6th largest city in the Philippines with 98 barangays, Zamboanguita has only 10 barangays.

== Etymology ==
A town rooted in history and replete with natural resources, Zamboanguita derived its name from an incident involving a coguita (octopus). Long before the Spaniards set foot onn Negros Island, fishermen from as far as Mindanao would visit the yet unnamed town and benefit from the bounty of its rich fishing grounds – from its small tugnos (juvenile gobies) to the large iho (shark) on nearby Apo Island.

One day, a group of Moro fishermen in the area found a coguita in their fishing net, which they then separated from their catch as it had tentacles and no gills. The leader of the Moro group then ordered one of his men to go to the beach and find a tree to “isab-ong ang coguita” ("hang the octopus"). Since then, every time an octopus was caught, it was hung on that particular tree.

Locals eventually started calling the place “Sab-ongan ug coguita.” When the Spaniards arrived, they called the town “Zamboangaguita” which was shortened to “Zamboanguita”.

Another theory has the term Zamboanguita come from the Spanish diminutive suffix -ita in relation to its neighbour to the south across the Dipolog Strait: the Zamboanga Peninsula.

== Geography ==
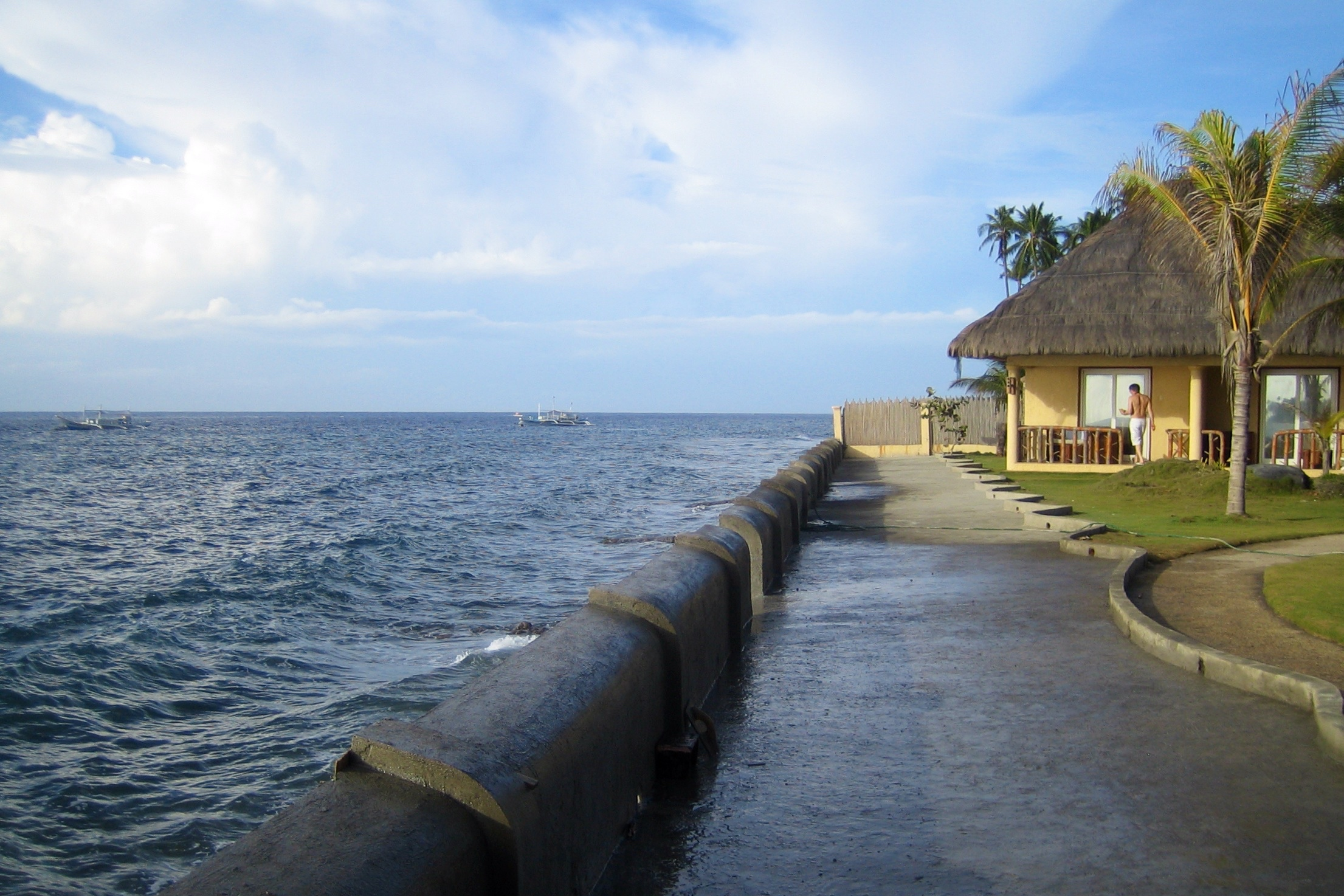
Shoreline in Zamboanguita

28 kilometres (17 mi) from Dumaguete, Zamboanguita is at the southern tip of the province of Negros Oriental and across from the island province of Siquijor. To the west of Zamboanguita is the municipality of Siaton, and to the north/east is the municipality of Dauin.

=== Barangays ===
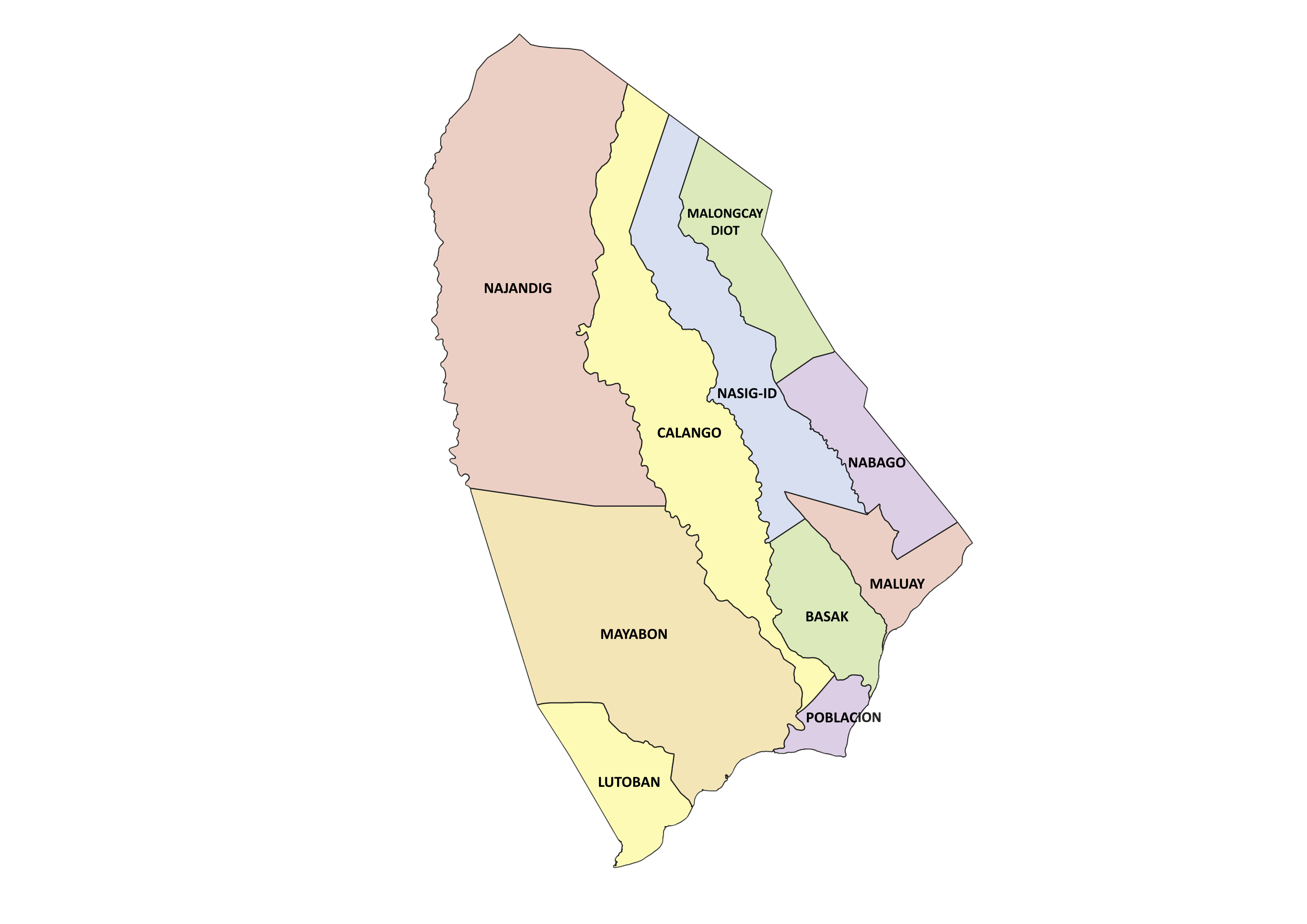
Political map of Zamboanguita

Zamboanguita is politically subdivided into 10 barangays. Each barangay consists of puroks and some have sitios.

PSGC	Barangay	Population			±% p.a.	
		2024		2010		
074625001	Basak (Basac)	8.2%	2,505	1,894	▴	1.96%
074625002	Calango	5.7%	1,721	1,469	▴	1.10%
074625003	Lutoban (Lotuban)	7.0%	2,131	1,728	▴	1.46%
074625004	Malongcay Diot	3.7%	1,114	940	▴	1.18%
074625005	Maluay	12.3%	3,752	2,954	▴	1.67%
074625006	Mayabon	25.0%	7,612	6,224	▴	1.41%
074625007	Nabago	4.1%	1,261	1,001	▴	1.61%
074625009	Najandig	5.1%	1,541	1,483	▴	0.27%
074625008	Nasig-id	4.9%	1,482	1,177	▴	1.61%
074625010	Poblacion	21.2%	6,450	6,126	▴	0.36%
	Total		30,412	24,996	▴	1.37%

=== Climate ===
Climate data for Zamboanguita, Negros Oriental
Month	Jan	Feb	Mar	Apr	May	Jun	Jul	Aug	Sep	Oct	Nov	Dec	Year
Mean daily maximum °C (°F)	30 (86)	30 (86)	31 (88)	33 (91)	32 (90)	31 (88)	30 (86)	30 (86)	30 (86)	29 (84)	30 (86)	30 (86)	31 (87)
Mean daily minimum °C (°F)	22 (72)	22 (72)	22 (72)	23 (73)	24 (75)	25 (77)	24 (75)	24 (75)	24 (75)	24 (75)	23 (73)	23 (73)	23 (74)
Average precipitation mm (inches)	26 (1.0)	22 (0.9)	28 (1.1)	41 (1.6)	95 (3.7)	136 (5.4)	147 (5.8)	126 (5.0)	132 (5.2)	150 (5.9)	98 (3.9)	46 (1.8)	1,047 (41.3)
Average rainy days	7.5	6.7	8.9	10.4	21.6	25.6	26.3	25.0	24.1	26.2	19.2	12.1	213.6
Source: Meteoblue (Use with caution: this is modeled/calculated data, not measured locally.)

== Demographics ==
Population census of Zamboanguita
Year	Pop.	±% p.a.
1903	6,181	—
1918	8,076	+1.80%
1939	10,141	+1.09%
1948	9,922	−0.24%
1960	11,692	+1.38%
1970	11,385	−0.27%
1975	12,822	+2.41%
1980	14,083	+1.89%
1990	17,110	+1.97%
1995	18,905	+1.89%
2000	23,338	+4.62%
2007	24,914	+0.91%
2010	24,996	+0.12%
2015	27,552	+1.87%
2020	29,569	+1.50%
2024	30,412	+0.68%
Source: Philippine Statistics Authority

== Economy ==
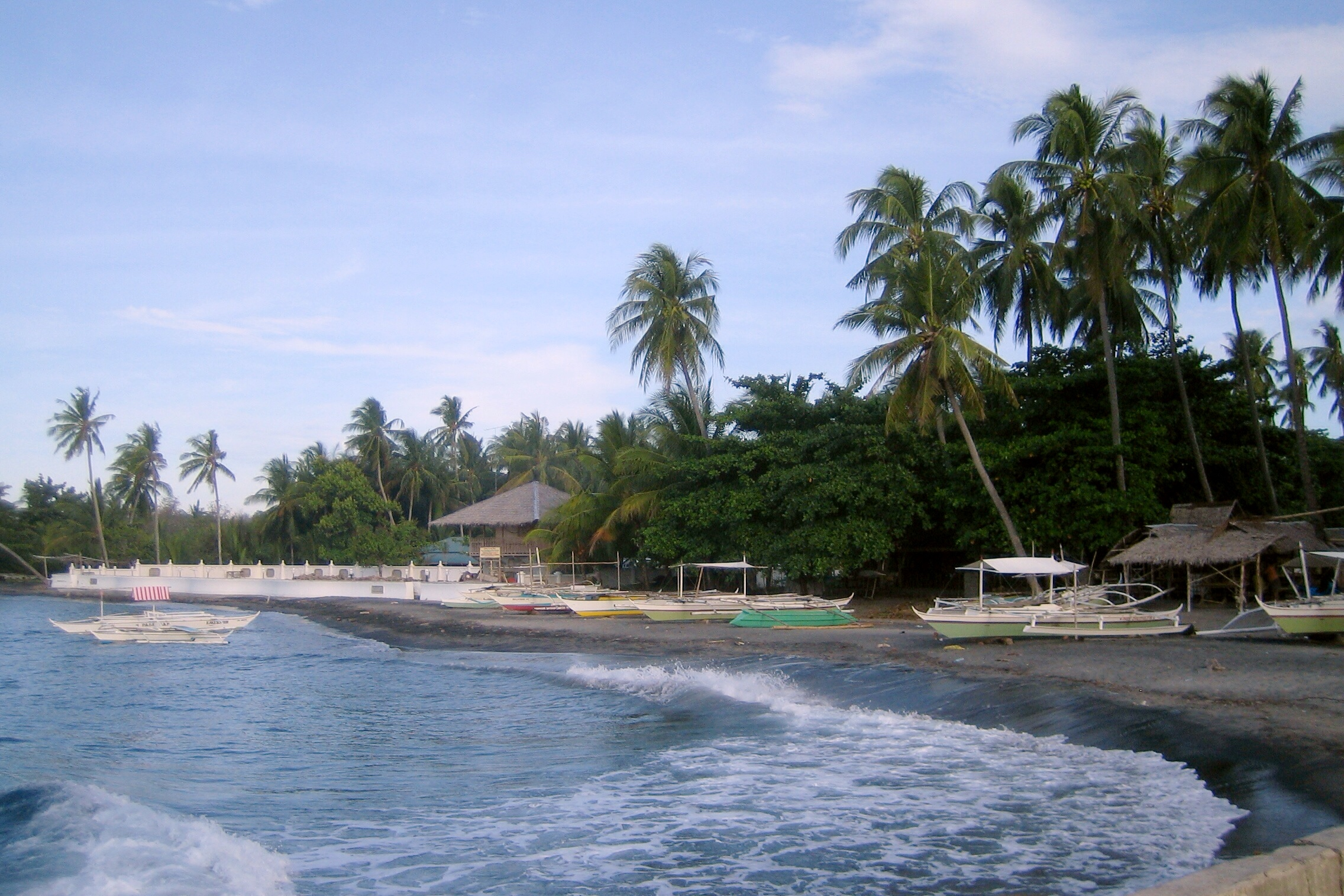
Pumpboats along the coast of Zamboanguita

Poverty incidence of Zamboanguita (%)

Source: Philippine Statistics Authority

== Tourism ==
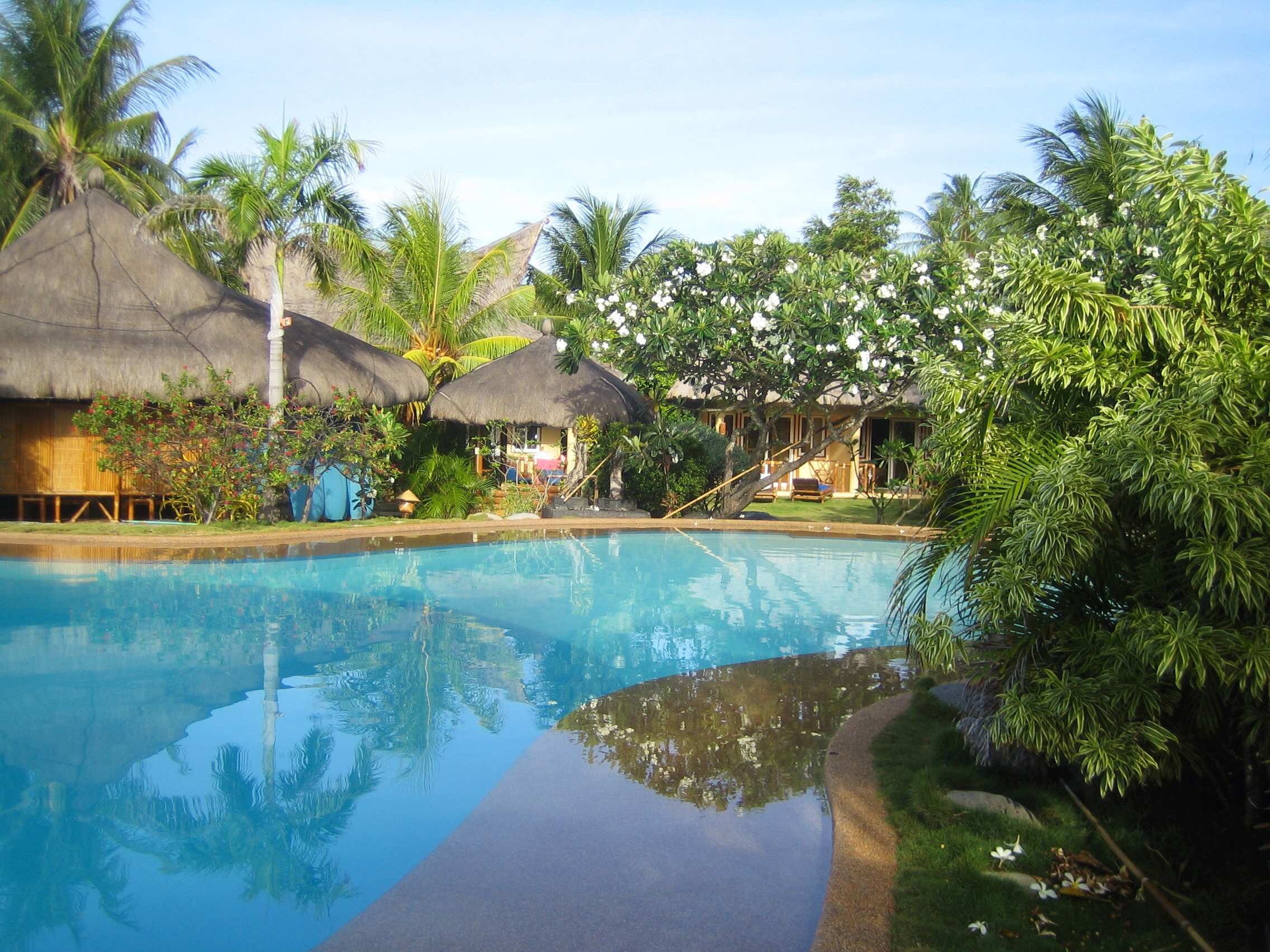
A resort in Zamboanguita

- Fiesta: San Isidro Labrador, May 15

== Government ==
It is part of the 3rd District of Negros Oriental.

Current elected officials of Zamboanguita (2022):

- Mayor: Jonah Pat L. Aviles
- Vice Mayor: Felipe Tuban Elmido Sr.
- Councilors:
  - ELMIDO, JUNIOR
  - TAAN, RICKY
  - PARTOSA, HELEN
  - PINILI, MARIO
  - TRINIDAD, FLOR
  - TRINIDAD, REINERIA
  - BANUA, KIKING
  - DELMO, CLINT CHARLES

== Education ==
The public schools in the town of Zamboanguita are administered by two school districts under the Schools Division of Negros Oriental.

Elementary schools:

- Basak Elementary School — Basak
- Benito Gadiana Elementary School — Sitio Kapandis, Mayabon
- Calango Elementary School — Calango
- Felix M. Tio Memorial Elementary School — Sitio Dumandan, Mayabon
- Gregorio Elmaga Memorial Elementary School — Nasig-id
- Kaladias Elementary School — Sitio Kaladias, Najandig
- Lutoban Elementary School — Lutoban
- Malongcay Elementary School — Malongcay Diot
- Maluay Central Elementary School — Maluay
- Mayabon Elementary School — Mayabon
- Moises Bangay Alanano Elementary School — Sitio Kalanggaman, Mayabon
- Nabago Elementary School — Nabago
- Salngan Elementary School — Sitio Salngan, Mayabon
- Zamboanguita Central Elementary School — Magsaysay Street, Poblacion

High schools:

- Gregorio Elmaga Memorial High School — Nasig-id
- Jose Marie Locsin Memorial High School — Sitio Salngan, Mayabon
- Kaladias High School — Sitio Kaladias, Najandig
- Santiago Delmo Memorial High School — Maluay
- Zamboanguita Science High School — Del Pilar Street, Poblacion

Private schools:

- Decor Carmeli Academy — Acupanda Street, Poblacion

== See also ==
- List of places named after places in the Philippines
