= 2022 Philippine House of Representatives elections in Soccsksargen =

- May 9, 2022
- All 9 Soccsksargen seats in the House of Representatives
Party	Seats	+/–
Lakas	2	New
PFP	2	+2
Nacionalista	1	−1
PDP–Laban	1	−4
NPC	1	+1
PCM	1	New
NUP	1	0
This lists parties that won seats. See the complete results below.

The 2022 Philippine House of Representatives elections in Soccsksargen were held on May 9, 2022.

== Summary ==
Congressional district	Incumbent	Incumbent's party	Winner	Winner's party	Winning margin
Cotabato–1st	Joselito Sacdalan	PDP–Laban	Joselito Sacdalan	PDP–Laban	83.44%
Cotabato–2nd	Rudy Caoagdan	Nacionalista	Rudy Caoagdan	Nacionalista	92.80%
Cotabato–3rd	Jose Tejada	Nacionalista	Samantha Santos	Lakas	24.21%
General Santos	New seat		Loreto Acharon	NPC	13.11%
Sarangani	Rogelio Pacquiao	PCM	Steve Solon	PCM	84.76%
South Cotabato–1st	Shirlyn Bañas-Nograles	PDP–Laban	Ed Lumayag	PFP	17.90%
South Cotabato–2nd	Ferdinand Hernandez	PDP–Laban	Peter Miguel	PFP	14.52%
Sultan Kudarat–1st	Rihan Sakaluran	Lakas	Rihan Sakaluran	Lakas	60.26%
Sultan Kudarat–2nd	Horacio Suansing Jr.	NUP	Horacio Suansing Jr.	NUP	19.02%

== Cotabato ==
=== 1st district ===
Incumbent Joselito Sacdalan of PDP–Laban ran for a second term.

Sacdalan won re-election against two other candidates.

Candidate	Party	Votes	%
Joselito Sacdalan (incumbent)	PDP–Laban	150,275	89.63
Toring dela Peña	PROMDI	10,383	6.19
Abdulbassit Dilangalen	Independent	6,996	4.17
Total		167,654	100.00
Total votes		196,181	–
Registered voters/turnout		231,247	84.84
PDP–Laban hold			
Source: Commission on Elections

=== 2nd district ===
Incumbent Rudy Caoagdan of the Nacionalista Party ran for a second term.

Caoagdan won re-election against Kier Labog (Independent).

Candidate	Party	Votes	%
Rudy Caoagdan (incumbent)	Nacionalista Party	170,262	96.40
Kier Labog	Independent	6,350	3.60
Total		176,612	100.00
Total votes		228,103	–
Registered voters/turnout		269,283	84.71
Nacionalista hold			
Source: Commission on Elections

=== 3rd district ===
Incumbent Jose Tejada of the Nacionalista Party was term-limited.

Tejada endorsed his wife, Nelda Tejada of PDP–Laban, who was defeated by Samantha Santos of Lakas–CMD. Rene Roldan (Independent) also ran for representative.

Candidate	Party	Votes	%
Samantha Santos	Lakas–CMD	119,079	58.38
Nelda Tejada	PDP–Laban	69,697	34.17
Rene Roldan	Independent	15,185	7.45
Total		203,961	100.00
Total votes		222,660	–
Registered voters/turnout		270,676	82.26
Lakas gain from Nacionalista			
Source: Commission on Elections

== General Santos ==
As a result of General Santos' redistricting in 2019, the district was created for the city. General Santos used to be under South Cotabato's 1st district.

General Santos vice mayor Loreto Acharon (Nationalist People's Coalition) won the election against General Santos mayor Ronnel Rivera (Nacionalista Party) and Jay Omila (Achievers with Integrity Movement).

Candidate	Party	Votes	%
Loreto Acharon	Nationalist People's Coalition	114,532	46.68
Ronnel Rivera	Nacionalista Party	82,382	33.57
Jay Omila	Achievers with Integrity Movement	48,462	19.75
Total		245,376	100.00
Total votes		276,919	–
Registered voters/turnout		360,232	76.87
NPC gain			
Source: Commission on Elections

== Sarangani ==
Incumbent Rogelio Pacquiao of the People's Champ Movement (PCM) retired to run for governor of Sarangani. He was previously affiliated with PDP–Laban.

The PCM nominated Sarangani governor Steve Solon, who won the election against Willie Dangane (Partido Pederal ng Maharlika).

Candidate	Party	Votes	%
Steve Solon	People's Champ Movement	204,076	92.38
Willie Dangane	Partido Pederal ng Maharlika	16,834	7.62
Total		220,910	100.00
Total votes		278,672	–
Registered voters/turnout		362,055	76.97
PCM hold			
Source: Commission on Elections

== South Cotabato ==
=== 1st district ===
As a result of South Cotabato's redistricting in 2019, the highly urbanized city of General Santos was separated from the district to create its own district.

Incumbent Shirlyn Banas-Nograles of PDP–Laban retired to run for mayor of General Santos.

PDP–Laban nominated Nograles' husband, Danny Nograles, who was defeated by former Polomolok mayor Ed Lumayag of the Partido Federal ng Pilipinas.

Candidate	Party	Votes	%
Ed Lumayag	Partido Federal ng Pilipinas	80,501	58.95
Danny Nograles	PDP–Laban	56,053	41.05
Total		136,554	100.00
Total votes		155,884	–
Registered voters/turnout		193,558	80.54
PFP gain from PDP–Laban			
Source: Commission on Elections

=== 2nd district ===
Term-limited incumbent Ferdinand Hernandez of PDP–Laban ran for governor of South Cotabato.

Koronadal vice mayor Peter Miguel (Partido Federal ng Pilipinas) won the election against former South Cotabato governor Daisy Avance Fuentes (Nacionalista Party), Tantangan mayor Benjamin Figueroa Jr. (PROMDI) and two other candidates.

Candidate	Party	Votes	%
Peter Miguel	Partido Federal ng Pilipinas	177,851	53.96
Daisy Avance Fuentes	Nacionalista Party	130,016	39.44
Benjamin Figueroa Jr.	PROMDI	18,300	5.55
Danny Dumandagan	Independent	2,639	0.80
Efren Biclar	Independent	817	0.25
Total		329,623	100.00
Total votes		354,166	–
Registered voters/turnout		421,751	83.98
PFP gain from PDP–Laban			
Source: Commission on Elections

== Sultan Kudarat ==
=== 1st district ===
Incumbent Rihan Sakaluran of Lakas–CMD ran for a second term. He was previously affiliated with the National Unity Party.

Sakaluran won re-election against Botog Valdez (Aksyon Demokratiko).

Candidate	Party	Votes	%
Rihan Sakaluran (incumbent)	Lakas–CMD	143,596	80.13
Botog Valdez	Aksyon Demokratiko	35,600	19.87
Total		179,196	100.00
Total votes		201,873	–
Registered voters/turnout		250,786	80.50
Lakas hold			
Source: Commission on Elections

=== 2nd district ===
Incumbent Horacio Suansing Jr. of the National Unity Party ran for a third term. He was previously affiliated with PDP–Laban.

Suansing won re-election against provincial board member Joseph Ortiz (Lakas–CMD).

Candidate	Party	Votes	%
Horacio Suansing Jr. (incumbent)	National Unity Party	101,042	59.51
Joseph Ortiz	Lakas–CMD	68,759	40.49
Total		169,801	100.00
Total votes		188,035	–
Registered voters/turnout		246,904	76.16
NUP hold			
Source: Commission on Elections
