= Legislative districts of South Cotabato =

Philippines administrative divisions

The legislative districts of South Cotabato are the representations of the province of South Cotabato and the urbanized city of General Santos in the various national legislatures of the Philippines. The province is currently represented in the lower house of the Congress of the Philippines through its first and second congressional districts.

Sarangani was last represented as part of South Cotabato in 1995, while General Santos is represented separately since 2022.

== History ==
Prior to gaining separate representation, areas now under the jurisdiction of South Cotabato were represented under the Department of Mindanao and Sulu (1917–1935) and the undivided province of Cotabato (1935–1967).

Republic Act No. 4849, enacted on June 18, 1966, created the province of South Cotabato from the southern municipalities of the old Cotabato province. Normally in this time period chartered cities — by virtue of being independently governed — are not enumerated as part of new provinces. However, given that the legality of the plebiscite results which ratified the Charter of the City of Rajah Buayan (Republic Act No. 4413, enacted on June 19, 1965) was still being decided in the courts at the time of R.A. 4849's approval, Section 1 of the said law explicitly listed the City of Rajah Buayan as part of South Cotabato in case it reverted to its former status as the municipality of General Santos, which eventually happened on 29 October 1966 when the Supreme Court nullified the 6 December 1965 COMELEC proclamation declaring the creation of the new chartered city.

Per Section 5 of Republic Act No. 4849, South Cotabato's first separate representative was elected in a special election held on the same day as the 1967 senatorial elections and began to serve starting in the second half of the 6th Congress. When General Santos finally became a city under the same name on June 15, 1968, by virtue of Republic Act No. 5412, it remained part of the representation of South Cotabato in accordance with Section 104 of its city charter.

South Cotabato was represented in the Interim Batasang Pambansa as part of Region XI from 1978 to 1984. The province returned three representatives, elected at-large, to the Regular Batasang Pambansa in 1984.

Under the new Constitution which was proclaimed on February 11, 1987, the province was reapportioned into three congressional districts; each elected its member to the restored House of Representatives starting that same year.

The passage of Republic Act No. 7228 and its subsequent ratification by plebiscite on November 28, 1992 separated South Cotabato's entire third district to create the new province of Sarangani. This automatically reduced the province's representation to two districts. The former third district first elected a representative under the designation Lone congressional district of Sarangani beginning in the 1995 election.

The signing of Republic Act No. 11243 on March 11, 2019 created a new congressional district for the highly urbanized city of General Santos by separating it from South Cotabato's first district. The city is designated as the "Lone Legislative District of General Santos" in the title of Republic Act No. 11243, but also as the "Third Legislative District of South Cotabato" in the text. However, the city effectively constitutes a lone district, as it does not vote for provincial officials of South Cotabato.

Given that it was already too late for the Commission on Elections (COMELEC) to change the old congressional district configuration data in the automated election system in time for the May 2019 polls, COMELEC Resolution No. 10524 was promulgated on April 11, 2019, to delay the elections for both the new lone congressional district of General Santos and the newly reconfigured first congressional district of South Cotabato to a date no less than six months from May 13, 2019. By virtue of COMELEC Resolution No. 10552, the date of elections for the first district of South Cotabato and the lone district of General Santos was set for October 26, 2019.

However, on September 10, 2019, the Supreme Court of the Philippines declared COMELEC Resolution No. 10524 null and void for violating the law, when COMELEC set separate special elections for the reconfigured first district of South Cotabato and the newly created lone district of General Santos instead of using the new district boundaries in the next regular (i.e., 2022) election, as RA 11243 intended. In the same ruling, the Supreme Court ordered COMELEC to convene a Special Provincial Board of Canvassers to proclaim the winning candidate, Shirlyn L. Bañas-Nograles who garnered 68.55% of the votes cast in the May 2019 election, as the duly elected representative of the 1st Congressional District of South Cotabato, including General Santos.

The Supreme Court ruling effectively maintains the old district configuration for the 18th Congress, and sets the election of the first separate representative for General Santos in the 2022 elections. By virtue of Republic Act No. 11243, General Santos was designated as Third District of South Cotabato.

On August 20, 2021, House Bill No. 10021 was filed by Representative Ferdinand Hernandez reapportioning the second district, creating a new third district and making General Santos officially a single legislative district separate from the province of South Cotabato. It passed on third and final reading in the House of Representatives on September 15, 2021, and in the Senate on January 31, 2022, with an amendment where the first election for the reapportioned seats will be in 2025. Polomolok, Tampakan and Tupi will constitute the first district; Koronadal, Banga and Tantangan will constitute the second district; and Norala, Santo Niño, Surallah, Lake Sebu and T'boli will constitute the third district. The bill lapsed into a law without then President Rodrigo Duterte's signature on June 2, 2022, and was indexed under Republic Act No. 11804.

== Current ==
=== 1st District ===
- Municipalities: Polomolok, Tampakan, Tupi
- Area: 957.97
- Population (2024): 297,574

Period	Representative
19th Congress; 2022–2025	Isidro D. Lumayag
20th Congress; 2025–Present	Isidro D. Lumayag

=== 2nd District ===
- City: Koronadal
- Municipalities: Banga, Tantangan
- Area: 630.45
- Population (2024): 341,950

Period	Representative
20th Congress; 2025–Present	Ferdinand L. Hernandez

=== 3rd District ===
- Municipalities: Norala, Santo Niño, Surallah, Lake Sebu, T'boli
- Area: 2,347.33
- Population (2024): 370,485

Period	Representative
20th Congress; 2025–Present	Dibu Tuan

=== Lone District ===
- City: General Santos
- Population (2024): 722,059
- Area: 492.86

Period	Representative
19th Congress; 2022–2025	Loreto B. Acharon
20th Congress; 2025–Present	Shirlyn L. Bañas - Nograles

== Defunct ==
=== 1st District ===
- City: General Santos (Note: Only votes as part of South Cotabato for representation in the various national legislatures since becoming a highly urbanized city in 1988.)
- Municipalities: Polomolok, Tampakan, Tupi

Period	Representative
8th Congress; 1987–1992	Adelbert W. Antonino
9th Congress; 1992–1995	Luwalhati R. Antonino
10th Congress; 1995–1998	Luwalhati R. Antonino
11th Congress; 1998–2001	Luwalhati R. Antonino
12th Congress; 2001–2004	Darlene R. Antonino-Custodio
13th Congress; 2004–2007	Darlene R. Antonino-Custodio
14th Congress; 2007–2010	Darlene R. Antonino-Custodio
15th Congress; 2010–2013	Pedro B. Acharon Jr.
16th Congress; 2013–2016	Pedro B. Acharon Jr.
17th Congress; 2016–2019	Pedro B. Acharon Jr.
18th Congress; 2019–2022	Shirlyn L. Bañas-Nograles

=== 2nd District ===
- City: Koronadal (Note: Became city in 2000)
- Municipalities: Banga, Lake Sebu, Norala, Santo Niño, Surallah, Tantangan, T'Boli

Period	Representative
8th Congress; 1987–1992	Hilario L. De Pedro III
9th Congress; 1992–1995	Daisy P. Avance-Fuentes
10th Congress; 1995–1998	Daisy P. Avance-Fuentes
11th Congress; 1998–2001	Daisy P. Avance-Fuentes
12th Congress; 2001–2004	Arthur Y. Pingoy, Jr.
13th Congress; 2004–2007	Arthur Y. Pingoy, Jr.
14th Congress; 2007–2010	Arthur Y. Pingoy, Jr.
15th Congress; 2010–2013	Daisy P. Avance-Fuentes
16th Congress; 2013–2016	Ferdinand L. Hernandez
17th Congress; 2016–2019	Ferdinand L. Hernandez
18th Congress; 2019–2022	Ferdinand L. Hernandez
19th Congress; 2022–2025	Peter B. Miguel

=== 3rd District ===
- Municipalities: Alabel, Glan, Kiamba, Maasim, Maitum, Malapatan, Malungon

Period	Representative
8th Congress; 1987–1992	James Chiongbian
9th Congress; 1992–1995	James Chiongbian

=== Lone District ===
- encompasses present-day provinces of Sarangani and South Cotabato, and the highly urbanized city of General Santos

Period	Representative
6th Congress; 1965–1969	see Lone district of Cotabato
6th Congress; 1965–1969	James Chiongbian (Note: Won the special election held on November 14, 1967, to fill the new province's congressional seat; took oath of office on January 22, 1968, and served for the remainder of the 6th Congress.)
7th Congress; 1969–1972	James Chiongbian

=== At-Large ===
- encompasses present-day provinces of Sarangani and South Cotabato, and the highly urbanized city of General Santos

Period	Representatives
Regular Batasang Pambansa; 1984–1986	Rufino B. Bañas
Regular Batasang Pambansa; 1984–1986	Hilario B. De Pedro
Regular Batasang Pambansa; 1984–1986	Rogelio Garcia

== See also ==
- South Cotabato's 1st congressional district
- South Cotabato's 2nd congressional district
- South Cotabato's 3rd congressional district
- General Santos's at-large congressional district
- Legislative district of Cotabato
- Legislative district of Sarangani
- Legislative districts of Sultan Kudarat
- Legislative district of Mindanao and Sulu
