= 2010 Soccsksargen local elections =

Local elections were held in Soccsksargen on May 10, 2010, as part of the 2010 Philippine general election.

== Cotabato ==
=== Governor ===
Incumbent governor Jesus Sacdalan of Lakas–Kampi–CMD ran for the House of Representatives in Cotabato's 1st district. Lakas–Kampi–CMD nominated representative Emmylou Mendoza, who won the election.

Candidate	Party	Votes	%
Emmylou Mendoza	Lakas–Kampi–CMD	236,966	54.03
Emmanuel Piñol	Nationalist People's Coalition	199,332	45.45
Kier Labog	Philippine Green Republican Party	1,447	0.33
Sucre Romancap	Independent	869	0.20
Total		438,614	100.00
Valid votes		438,614	95.58
Invalid/blank votes		20,268	4.42
Total votes		458,882	100.00
Lakas–Kampi–CMD hold			
Source: Commission on Elections

=== Vice governor ===
Gregorio Ipong of Lakas–Kampi–CMD was elected as vice governor.

Candidate	Party	Votes	%
Gregorio Ipong	Lakas–Kampi–CMD	252,945	62.88
Romeo Araña	Nationalist People's Coalition	132,411	32.92
Baculudan Talib	Independent	16,909	4.20
Total		402,265	100.00
Valid votes		402,265	87.66
Invalid/blank votes		56,617	12.34
Total votes		458,882	100.00
Source: Commission on Elections

=== Provincial board ===
The Cotabato Provincial Board is composed of 13 board members, 10 of whom are elected.

Party	Votes	%	Seats
Lakas–Kampi–CMD	857,261	51.22	9
Liberal Party	318,571	19.03	1
Nationalist People's Coalition	200,979	12.01	0
Nacionalista Party	102,381	6.12	0
PDP–Laban	11,015	0.66	0
Independent	183,423	10.96	0
Total	1,673,630	100.00	10
Total votes	458,882	–	
Source: Commission on Elections

==== 1st district ====
Candidate	Party	Votes	%
Shirlyn Macasarte	Liberal Party	88,037	11.31
Eliseo Garcesa Jr.	Lakas–Kampi–CMD	85,438	10.98
Ernesto Concepcion	Lakas–Kampi–CMD	84,815	10.90
Celestino Rapacon	Lakas–Kampi–CMD	84,081	10.80
Vicente Sorupia Jr.	Lakas–Kampi–CMD	74,862	9.62
Jose Montgomery Pader	Liberal Party	62,115	7.98
Dulia Sultan	Lakas–Kampi–CMD	59,566	7.65
Maria Belen Sabio	Liberal Party	56,433	7.25
Jaime Gornez	Liberal Party	33,501	4.30
Manny Pedtamanan	Independent	32,798	4.21
Edslapel Andie	Liberal Party	25,523	3.28
Ibrahim Lintongan	Nacionalista Party	17,409	2.24
Ayatollah Abdulsalam	Independent	16,657	2.14
Datu Sharief Sultan	Independent	14,892	1.91
Maguid Malaguia	Independent	13,362	1.72
Albert Bacat	PDP–Laban	11,015	1.42
Norodin Mangulamas	Independent	6,130	0.79
Amin Sindao	Independent	5,033	0.65
Nasrodin Tamay	Independent	3,637	0.47
Jay Sabangan	Independent	3,115	0.40
Total		778,419	100.00
Total votes		220,280	–
Source: Commission on Elections

==== 2nd district ====
Candidate	Party	Votes	%
Cristobal Cadungon	Lakas–Kampi–CMD	119,166	13.31
Airene Claire Pagal	Lakas–Kampi–CMD	100,615	11.24
Jose Tejada	Lakas–Kampi–CMD	89,051	9.95
Onofre Respicio	Lakas–Kampi–CMD	87,221	9.74
Noel Baynosa	Lakas–Kampi–CMD	72,446	8.09
Joselito Mercado	Nationalist People's Coalition	70,700	7.90
Roberto Omandac	Liberal Party	52,962	5.92
Alan Amador	Independent	52,273	5.84
Rodrigo Pedregosa	Nationalist People's Coalition	46,327	5.17
Freddie Sales	Nationalist People's Coalition	41,982	4.69
Moises Renan Sungcad	Nationalist People's Coalition	41,970	4.69
Gutzer Law Andolana	Nacionalista Party	36,270	4.05
Jose Tuburan Jr.	Nacionalista Party	32,415	3.62
Eduardo Dizon	Independent	28,572	3.19
Vilma Gonzales	Nacionalista Party	11,602	1.30
Bautista Buan	Independent	6,954	0.78
Francisco Tagum	Nacionalista Party	4,685	0.52
Total		895,211	100.00
Total votes		238,602	–
Source: Commission on Elections

== General Santos ==
=== Mayor ===
Term-limited incumbent mayor Pedro Acharon Jr. of the Nationalist People's Coalition (NPC) ran for the House of Representatives in South Cotabato's 1st district. The NPC nominated representative Darlene Antonino-Custodio, who won the election.

Candidate	Party	Votes	%
Darlene Antonino-Custodio	Nationalist People's Coalition	82,985	52.53
Florentina Congson	People's Champ Movement	29,068	18.40
Rosalita Nuñez	PDP–Laban	25,953	16.43
Loreto Acharon	Lakas–Kampi–CMD	19,958	12.63
Total		157,964	100.00
Valid votes		157,964	96.04
Invalid/blank votes		6,507	3.96
Total votes		164,471	100.00
Nationalist People's Coalition hold			
Source: Commission on Elections

=== Vice mayor ===
Shirlyn Bañas-Nograles of the People's Champ Movement was elected as vice mayor.

Candidate	Party	Votes	%
Shirlyn Bañas-Nograles	People's Champ Movement	67,655	47.43
Jose Orlando Acharon	Achievers with Integrity Movement	66,189	46.40
Benhur Mongao	PDP–Laban	8,807	6.17
Total		142,651	100.00
Valid votes		142,651	86.73
Invalid/blank votes		21,820	13.27
Total votes		164,471	100.00
Source: Commission on Elections

=== City council ===
The General Santos City Council is composed of 15 councilors, 12 of whom are elected.

Party	Votes	%	Seats
Liberal Party	789,440	51.49	10
Lakas–Kampi–CMD	293,699	19.15	1
People's Champ Movement	225,847	14.73	0
PDP–Laban	61,426	4.01	0
Independent	162,915	10.62	1
Total	1,533,327	100.00	12
Total votes	164,471	–	
Source: Commission on Elections

Candidate	Party	Votes	%
Ronnel Rivera	Independent	106,617	6.95
Elizabeth Bagonoc	Liberal Party	80,325	5.24
Vivencio Dinopol	Liberal Party	80,221	5.23
Richard Atendido	Liberal Party	77,504	5.05
Nepthale Natividad	Liberal Party	73,002	4.76
Eduardo Leyson IV	Liberal Party	68,858	4.49
Dante Vicente	Liberal Party	68,281	4.45
Virginia Llido	Liberal Party	65,999	4.30
Dominador Lagare III	Lakas–Kampi–CMD	61,668	4.02
Marius Orlando Oco	Liberal Party	59,322	3.87
Margareth Rose Santos	Liberal Party	57,137	3.73
Remus de Claro	Liberal Party	55,150	3.60
Peter Armand Henares	Liberal Party	54,415	3.55
Marcelino Dospueblos	Liberal Party	49,226	3.21
Honesto Acharon	Lakas–Kampi–CMD	46,870	3.06
Francisco Gacal	People's Champ Movement	44,649	2.91
Danilo Congson	People's Champ Movement	42,518	2.77
George Catapang	People's Champ Movement	32,815	2.14
Arturo Cloma	Lakas–Kampi–CMD	28,023	1.83
Sannie Sombrio	Lakas–Kampi–CMD	27,969	1.82
Jay Mathew Mariano	People's Champ Movement	22,911	1.49
Rafael Montilla	Lakas–Kampi–CMD	22,621	1.48
Francis Martinez	Lakas–Kampi–CMD	20,767	1.35
Zenaida Valencia	People's Champ Movement	18,624	1.21
Rommel Catolico	Lakas–Kampi–CMD	17,902	1.17
Alvin Royeca	Independent	17,861	1.16
Eduardo Sunga	Lakas–Kampi–CMD	17,436	1.14
Carmen Lorenzo	People's Champ Movement	15,289	1.00
Ma. Theresa Ciocon	People's Champ Movement	14,739	0.96
Alfredo Toroctocon	Lakas–Kampi–CMD	14,716	0.96
Abraham Nilong	Lakas–Kampi–CMD	13,577	0.89
Christopher Guarin	People's Champ Movement	13,254	0.86
Juliet Cunanan	Lakas–Kampi–CMD	12,816	0.84
Edwin Quilban	PDP–Laban	11,866	0.77
Telesforo Zosa	People's Champ Movement	11,213	0.73
Waldemar Soguilon	Independent	9,885	0.64
Francisco Pasicolan	People's Champ Movement	9,835	0.64
Danilo Tinoco	Lakas–Kampi–CMD	9,334	0.61
Jesus Espinosa	PDP–Laban	9,082	0.59
Rogelio Enero	PDP–Laban	8,595	0.56
Pedro Perez	Independent	8,219	0.54
Benito de Guzman	PDP–Laban	8,203	0.53
Manuel Malinao	PDP–Laban	7,867	0.51
Abedin Osop	Independent	7,254	0.47
Salvador Mojado	Independent	7,084	0.46
Zaldy Sentina	PDP–Laban	7,067	0.46
Fermin Seranias	PDP–Laban	6,264	0.41
Bonifacio Doria Jr.	Independent	5,995	0.39
Conrado Ilumba	PDP–Laban	2,482	0.16
Total		1,533,327	100.00
Total votes		164,471	–
Source: Commission on Elections

== Sarangani ==
=== Governor ===
Incumbent governor Miguel Rene Dominguez of Lakas–Kampi–CMD won re-election to a third term.

Candidate	Party	Votes	%
Miguel Rene Dominguez	Lakas–Kampi–CMD	89,668	51.28
Juan Domino	People's Champ Movement	85,196	48.72
Total		174,864	100.00
Valid votes		174,864	94.29
Invalid/blank votes		10,586	5.71
Total votes		185,450	100.00
Lakas–Kampi–CMD hold			
Source: Commission on Elections

=== Vice governor ===
Incumbent vice governor Steve Solon of Lakas–Kampi–CMD was re-elected to a second term.

Candidate	Party	Votes	%
Steve Solon	Lakas–Kampi–CMD	88,269	53.61
Fredo Basino	People's Champ Movement	76,373	46.39
Total		164,642	100.00
Valid votes		164,642	88.78
Invalid/blank votes		20,808	11.22
Total votes		185,450	100.00
Source: Commission on Elections

=== Provincial board ===
The Sarangani Provincial Board is composed of 14 board members, 10 of whom are elected.

Party	Votes	%	Seats
People's Champ Movement	361,221	53.13	9
Lakas–Kampi–CMD	295,524	43.47	1
Pwersa ng Masang Pilipino	4,992	0.73	0
Independent	18,159	2.67	0
Total	679,896	100.00	10
Total votes	185,450	–	
Source: Commission on Elections

==== 1st district ====
Candidate	Party	Votes	%
Elmer de Peralta	People's Champ Movement	24,184	14.83
Cornelio Martinez Jr.	People's Champ Movement	23,382	14.33
Limuel Gacula	Lakas–Kampi–CMD	21,680	13.29
Alexander Bryan Reganit	People's Champ Movement	21,316	13.07
George Falgui	Lakas–Kampi–CMD	19,430	11.91
Nicanor Ballan	Lakas–Kampi–CMD	19,228	11.79
Umbra Macagcalat	Lakas–Kampi–CMD	16,252	9.96
Pirot Manguigin	People's Champ Movement	12,656	7.76
Iyadh Bandrang	Pwersa ng Masang Pilipino	4,992	3.06
Total		163,120	100.00
Total votes		58,024	–
Source: Commission on Elections

==== 2nd district ====
Candidate	Party	Votes	%
Hermie Galzote	People's Champ Movement	52,628	10.18
Eugene Alzate	People's Champ Movement	50,846	9.84
Eleanor Saguiguit	People's Champ Movement	49,905	9.66
Virgilio Tobias	People's Champ Movement	45,769	8.86
Benedicto Ruiz II	People's Champ Movement	40,985	7.93
Abdulracman Pangolima	People's Champ Movement	39,550	7.65
Napoleon Alaba	Lakas–Kampi–CMD	39,174	7.58
Eunice Santos	Lakas–Kampi–CMD	38,582	7.47
Jaime Tatad	Lakas–Kampi–CMD	38,406	7.43
Rolando Octavio Jr.	Lakas–Kampi–CMD	38,188	7.39
Ting Musa	Lakas–Kampi–CMD	34,180	6.61
Amelito Arnold Cariño	Lakas–Kampi–CMD	30,404	5.88
Roseller Lim	Independent	18,159	3.51
Total		516,776	100.00
Total votes		127,426	–
Source: Commission on Elections

== South Cotabato ==
=== Governor ===
Term-limited incumbent governor Daisy Avance Fuentes of the Nationalist People's Coalition (NPC) ran for the House of Representatives in South Cotabato's 2nd district. The NPC nominated Dinand Hernandez, but was defeated by representative Arthur Pingoy of Lakas–Kampi–CMD.

Candidate	Party	Votes	%
Arthur Pingoy Jr.	Lakas–Kampi–CMD	120,021	39.67
Dinand Hernandez	Nationalist People's Coalition	107,870	35.65
Fernando Miguel	Pwersa ng Masang Pilipino	74,687	24.68
Total		302,578	100.00
Valid votes		302,578	95.49
Invalid/blank votes		14,287	4.51
Total votes		316,865	100.00
Lakas–Kampi–CMD gain from Nationalist People's Coalition			
Source: Commission on Elections

=== Vice governor ===
Elmo Tolosa of Lakas–Kampi–CMD was elected as vice governor.

Candidate	Party	Votes	%
Elmo Tolosa	Lakas–Kampi–CMD	119,388	42.62
Rene Jumilla	Nationalist People's Coalition	107,430	38.36
Marie Antonina Hurtado	Pwersa ng Masang Pilipino	53,272	19.02
Total		280,090	100.00
Valid votes		280,090	88.39
Invalid/blank votes		36,775	11.61
Total votes		316,865	100.00
Source: Commission on Elections

=== Provincial board ===
The South Cotabato Provincial Board is composed of 13 board members, 10 of whom are elected.

Party	Votes	%	Seats
Lakas–Kampi–CMD	437,366	32.51	2
Nationalist People's Coalition	429,393	31.92	4
Pwersa ng Masang Pilipino	273,309	20.32	2
Partido Demokratiko Sosyalista ng Pilipinas	74,045	5.50	1
Independent	131,199	9.75	1
Total	1,345,312	100.00	10
Total votes	316,865	–	
Source: Commission on Elections

==== 1st district ====
Candidate	Party	Votes	%
Honey Lumayag	Nationalist People's Coalition	49,117	22.23
Antonette Mariano-Barroso	Nationalist People's Coalition	47,592	21.54
Jose Madanguit	Nationalist People's Coalition	45,091	20.41
Jobeelyn Baitus	Lakas–Kampi–CMD	29,897	13.53
Eduardo Dimamay	Lakas–Kampi–CMD	19,832	8.98
Noel Abellera	Pwersa ng Masang Pilipino	17,882	8.09
Carlos Ramo	Lakas–Kampi–CMD	11,522	5.22
Total		220,933	100.00
Total votes		94,215	–
Source: Commission on Elections

==== 2nd district ====
Candidate	Party	Votes	%
Cecile Diel	Independent	90,069	8.01
Samuel Ladot	Lakas–Kampi–CMD	75,774	6.74
Ervin Luntao	Lakas–Kampi–CMD	75,218	6.69
Jose Henry Aguirre	Pwersa ng Masang Pilipino	74,205	6.60
Ernesto Catedral	Partido Demokratiko Sosyalista ng Pilipinas	74,045	6.59
Pablito Subere	Pwersa ng Masang Pilipino	64,333	5.72
Agustin Dema-ala	Nationalist People's Coalition	63,101	5.61
Tomas Aniceto Alba	Lakas–Kampi–CMD	62,264	5.54
Sergio Morales Jr.	Lakas–Kampi–CMD	60,744	5.40
Carl Esparcia	Nationalist People's Coalition	57,868	5.15
Dominador Baay	Lakas–Kampi–CMD	52,590	4.68
Francis Carlos	Nationalist People's Coalition	52,408	4.66
Romeo Januto	Lakas–Kampi–CMD	49,525	4.40
Angelito Mendoza Sr.	Nationalist People's Coalition	46,720	4.16
Juan Macababbad	Nationalist People's Coalition	37,253	3.31
Johnny Landero	Pwersa ng Masang Pilipino	32,569	2.90
Ruel Bagunoc	Pwersa ng Masang Pilipino	32,235	2.87
Noel Garrovillo	Nationalist People's Coalition	30,243	2.69
Ramonito Crespo	Pwersa ng Masang Pilipino	29,953	2.66
Wilfredo Adorador	Independent	28,179	2.51
Elsie Cerveza	Pwersa ng Masang Pilipino	22,132	1.97
Ramil Biare	Independent	7,415	0.66
Romulo Manjares	Independent	5,536	0.49
Total		1,124,379	100.00
Total votes		222,650	–
Source: Commission on Elections

== Sultan Kudarat ==
=== Governor ===
Term-limited incumbent governor Suharto Mangudadatu of Lakas–Kampi–CMD won re-election to a second term.

Candidate	Party	Votes	%
Suharto Mangudadatu	Lakas–Kampi–CMD	141,727	62.12
Carlos Valdez Jr.	Nationalist People's Coalition	82,049	35.96
Rodolfo Estorque	Independent	2,219	0.97
Ephraim Defiño	Independent	2,152	0.94
Total		228,147	100.00
Valid votes		228,147	92.09
Invalid/blank votes		19,594	7.91
Total votes		247,741	100.00
Lakas–Kampi–CMD hold			
Source: Commission on Elections

=== Vice governor ===
Ernesto Matias of Lakas–Kampi–CMD was elected as vice governor unopposed.

Candidate	Party	Votes	%
Ernesto Matias	Lakas–Kampi–CMD	144,275	100.00
Total		144,275	100.00
Valid votes		144,275	58.24
Invalid/blank votes		103,466	41.76
Total votes		247,741	100.00
Source: Commission on Elections

=== Provincial board ===
The Sultan Kudarat Provincial Board is composed of 13 board members, 10 of whom are elected.

Party	Votes	%	Seats
Lakas–Kampi–CMD	593,661	83.82	9
Lapiang Manggagawa	25,727	3.63	0
Partido Demokratiko Sosyalista ng Pilipinas	13,691	1.93	0
Independent	75,144	10.61	1
Total	708,223	100.00	10
Total votes	247,741	–	
Source: Commission on Elections

==== 1st district ====
Candidate	Party	Votes	%
Eduardo Duque	Lakas–Kampi–CMD	81,224	19.38
Generoso Pagatpatan	Lakas–Kampi–CMD	80,153	19.13
Francis Eric Recinto	Lakas–Kampi–CMD	76,138	18.17
Orfelina Segura	Lakas–Kampi–CMD	75,186	17.94
Benigno Garcia	Lakas–Kampi–CMD	68,666	16.39
Eduardo Quezon	Independent	37,655	8.99
Total		419,022	100.00
Total votes		137,403	–
Source: Commission on Elections

==== 2nd district ====
Candidate	Party	Votes	%
Cornelio Posadas	Lakas–Kampi–CMD	49,686	17.18
Cesar Fornan	Lakas–Kampi–CMD	47,139	16.30
Fernando Ploteña	Lakas–Kampi–CMD	40,848	14.12
Rolando Forro	Lakas–Kampi–CMD	40,707	14.08
Peter Peralta	Independent	37,489	12.96
Datusalem Karon	Lakas–Kampi–CMD	33,914	11.73
Sonny Dequiña	Lapiang Manggagawa	25,727	8.90
Salindatu Druz Ali	Partido Demokratiko Sosyalista ng Pilipinas	13,691	4.73
Total		289,201	100.00
Total votes		110,338	–
Source: Commission on Elections
