= Gaudencio Antonino =

Filipino politician and businessman

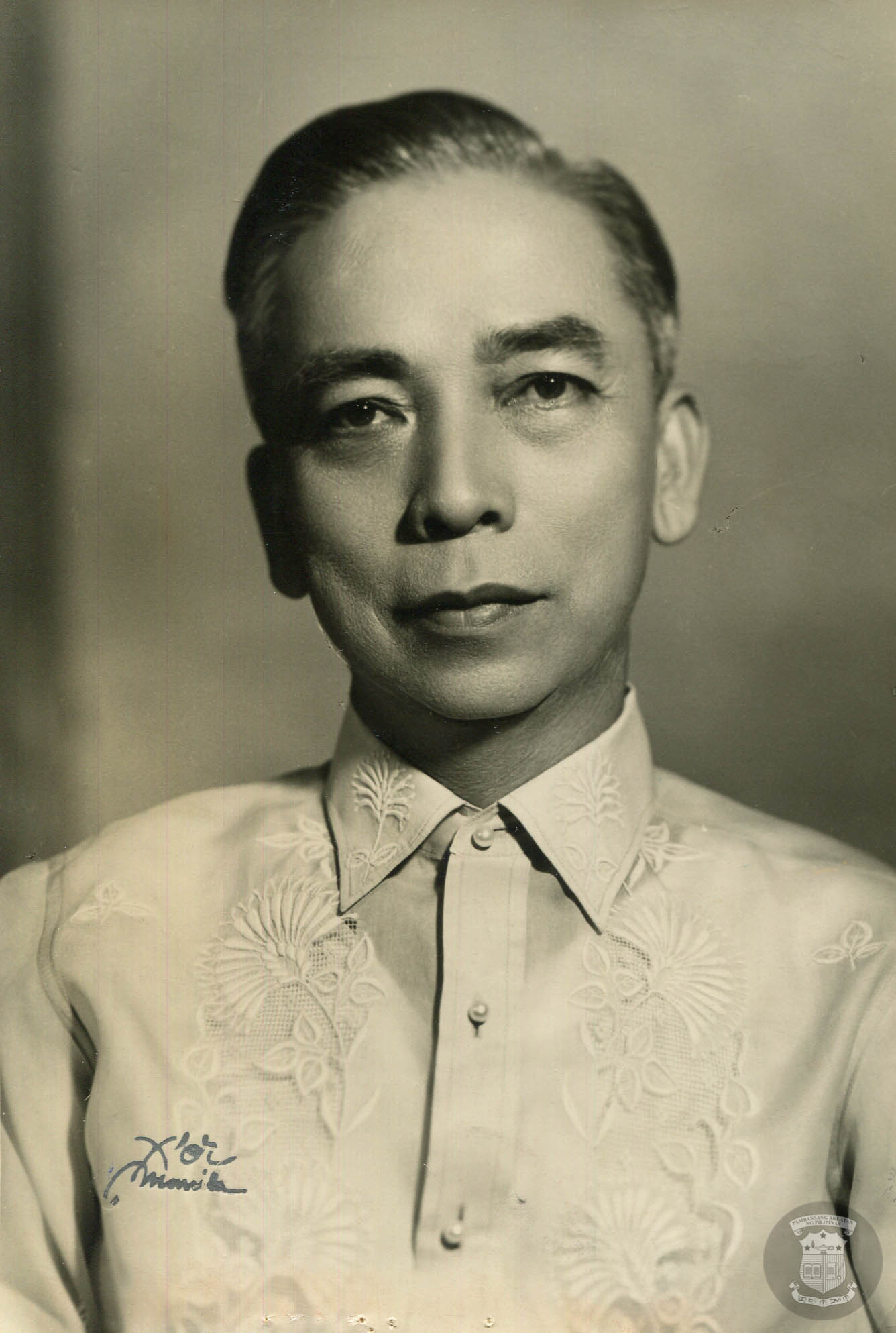
- An undated portrait of Antonino

Senator of the Philippines
- In office December 30, 1961 – November 13, 1967

President of the Chamber of Commerce of the Philippine Islands
- In office 1960–1961
- Preceded by: Marcelo Balatbat
- Succeeded by: Alfonso Calalang

Personal details
- Born: February 9, 1909 Jaen, Nueva Ecija, Philippine Islands
- Died: November 13, 1967 (aged 58) Dolores, Quezon, Philippines
- Resting place: Manila Memorial Park – Sucat, Parañaque
- Party: Independent (1965–1967)
- Other political affiliations: Liberal (1961–1965)
- Spouse: Magnolia Welborn
- Relations: Luwalhati Antonino (daughter-in-law); Darlene Antonino Custodio (granddaughter)
- Children: 4, including Gaudencio Jr., Rodolfo and Adelbert
- Education: University of the Philippines
- Occupation: Engineer; Businessman; Politician
- Profession: Civil engineer

Gaudencio Embuscado Antonino (February 9, 1909 – November 13, 1967) was a Filipino politician, civil engineer, and businessman who served as a member of the Philippine Senate from 1961 until his death in a helicopter crash in 1967.

== Early life and career ==
Gaudencio E. Antonino was born in Jaen, Nueva Ecija. He obtained his civil engineering degree at the University of the Philippines and placed 7th in the licensure examinations. He then worked as an assistant engineer in the bureau of Public Works from 1933 to 1936.

During the Second World War, he served in the USAFFE and later in the guerrilla movement as a 2nd lieutenant in the 101st Engineer Battalion and a first lieutenant in the Western Luzon sector in 1945.

After the war, Antonino worked as a business executive, specializing in the lumber industry.

== Senator ==
Antonino was elected to the Senate as a candidate of the Liberal Party in 1961 and became the chairman of the Senate Committee on Public Works and Communications and National Defense and Security. He became known for opposing a massive increase of allowances to congressmen in 1965 which generated a national scandal. He also introduced the insurance program for barangay officials and sat as a concurrent member of the monetary board of the Central Bank of the Philippines. He sought the presidential nomination of the Nacionalista Party for the 1965 Philippine presidential election but lost to Ferdinand Marcos. He thereafter identified as an independent.

== Personal life and death ==
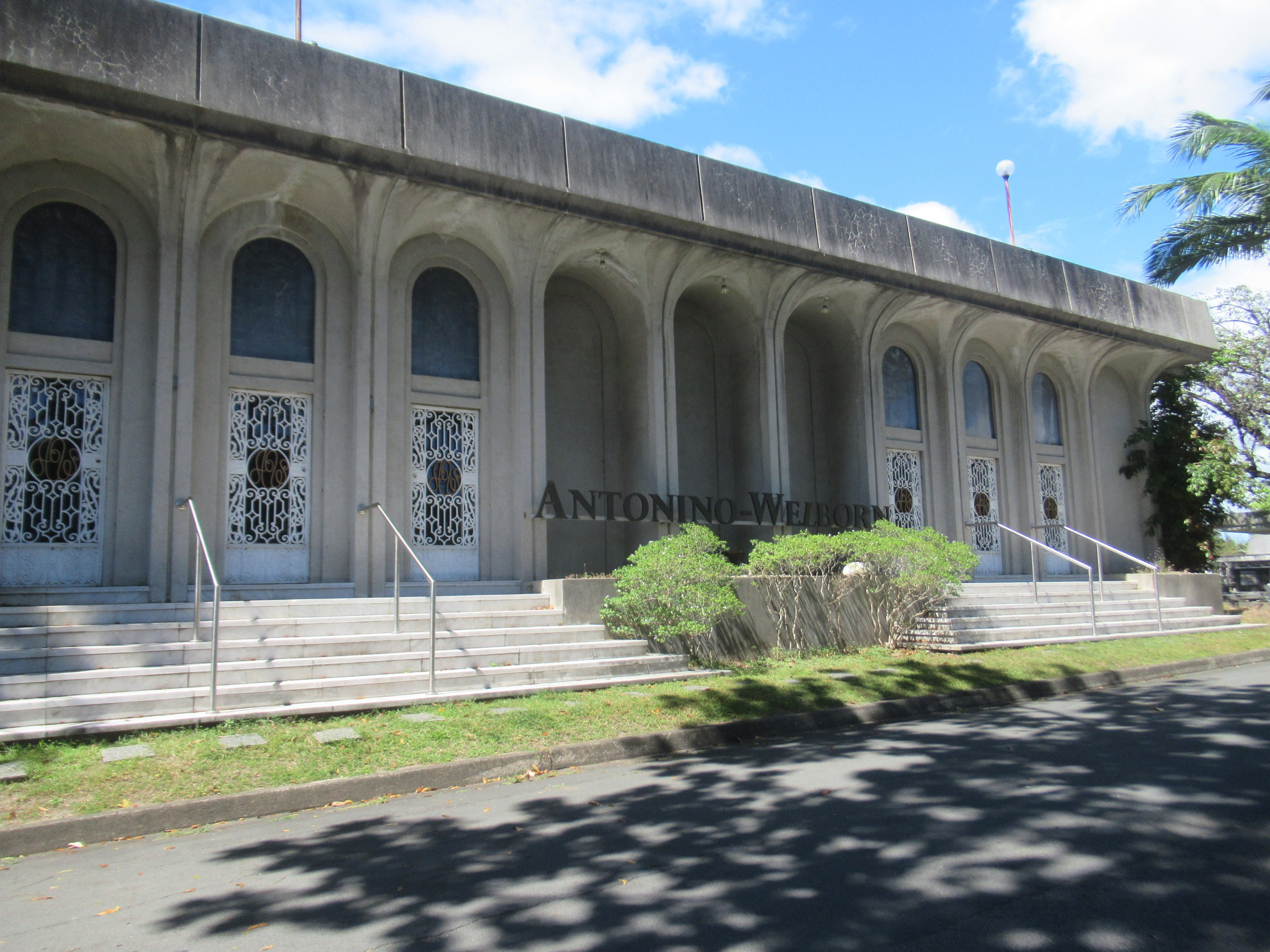
Magnolia & Gaudencio Antonino's mausoleum at the Manila Memorial Park – Sucat.

Antonino died while campaigning for reelection in the crash of his personal helicopter in Dolores, Quezon, a day before the 1967 Philippine Senate election. Despite his death, he came out third in the balloting and was substituted by his widow, Magnolia (née Welborn), herself a Congresswoman of La Union's 1st district who filled out his term until the Senate was abolished following the declaration of Martial Law in 1972. They had four children, including Gaudencio Jr., Rodolfo and Adelbert. Rodolfo served as the representative of Nueva Ecija's 4th congressional district from 2004 to 2013, while Adelbert served as the congressman for South Cotabato's 1st congressional district from 1987 to 1992, and as the Mayor of General Santos from 1992 to 1995 and from 1998 to 2001. Antonino's granddaughter Darlene Antonino Custodio is the daughter of Adelbert, and also served in the same positions as her father, both as representative for the first district of South Cotabato and as mayor of General Santos.

Two barrios were renamed after and in honor of him. The first, formerly named Tinalunan in Gloria, Oriental Mindoro was through the enactment of Republic Act No. 5575. The other one, was Barrio Pangi in what is now Maco, Davao de Oro through RA No. 5594.
