= Magnolia Antonino =

Filipina politician (1915–2010)

The Honorable Magnolia W. Antonino
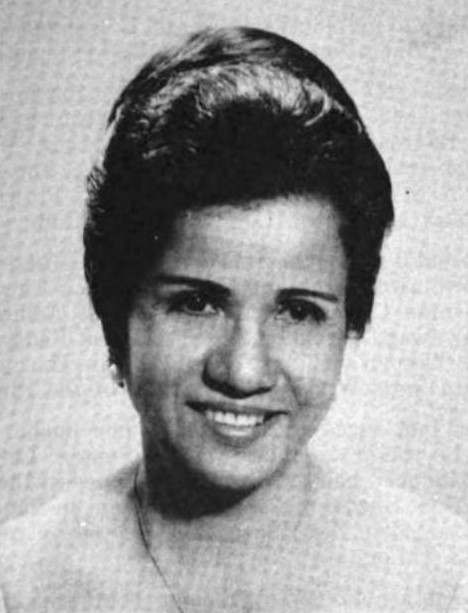
- Representative Antonino's official portrait during the 6th Congress.

Senator of the Philippines
- In office December 30, 1967 – September 23, 1972

Member of the Philippine House of Representatives from La Union's 1st district
- In office December 30, 1965 – December 30, 1967
- Preceded by: Francisco Ortega
- Succeeded by: Joaquin L. Ortega

Personal details
- Born: Magnolia Rodriguez Welborn; December 14, 1915 Balaoan, La Union, Philippine Islands
- Died: July 22, 2010 (aged 94)
- Resting place: Manila Memorial Park – Sucat, Parañaque
- Party: Nacionalista (1967–1972)
- Other political affiliations: Independent (1965–1967)
- Spouse: Gaudencio Antonino (died 1967)
- Children: 4, including Rodolfo and Adelbert
- Relatives: Luwalhati Antonino (daughter-in-law); Darlene Antonino Custodio (granddaughter)
- Education: Philippine Normal School

Magnolia Rodriguez Welborn Antonino (née Welborn; December 14, 1915 – July 22, 2010) was a Senator of the Philippines. The daughter of George Welborn and Hipolita Rodriguez, she was married to Gaudencio Antonino, also a senator.

== Early life ==
Magnolia Welborn was born in Balaoan, La Union, on December 14, 1915, to George Welborn and Hipolita Rodriguez. Her parents were unmarried until December 1919; George was an American.

== Personal life ==
She was married to Gaudencio Antonino of Jaen, Nueva Ecija. The couple had four children, including Nueva Ecija 4th district congressman Rodolfo "Rody" Antonino and two-time General Santos mayor Adelbert W. Antonino. She was also the grandmother of former General Santos mayor and South Cotabato first district representative Darlene Antonino Custodio.

== Education ==
Antonino completed combined normal courses from the Philippine Normal School in 1934. She started as a home economics teacher, then became principal at the Balaoan Elementary School, and later worked as a teacher in Misamis Occidental and Misamis Oriental.

== Political career ==
Antonino was elected in the House of Representatives as an independent candidate for the first district of La Union in 1965. She ran and won as senator in lieu of her husband who died in a helicopter crash on the eve of the 1967 Senate election. After her election, her senatorial eligibility was contested at the Senate Electoral Tribunal in 1971 by outgoing senator Camilo Osías, who unsuccessfully contended that Antonino was a United States citizen, when in fact her parents were unmarried at her birth, thereby she had the same Philippine citizenship as her mother. After witnesses, including Rodriguez, her mother, testified and other evidence was presented, the tribunal ruled in August 1971 that Antonino qualified as a senator and dismissed Osías's protest. She served until the closure of Congress in 1972 following the declaration of martial law by President Ferdinand Marcos.

During her term as senator from 1968 to 1972, Antonino worked for the passage of laws including Republic Act 6124 (providing for the fixing of the maximum selling prices of essential articles or commodities and creating the Price Control Council); RA 6235 (prohibiting explosives and flammables, corrosive or poisonous substances or material in passenger aircraft and regulating the loading thereof in cargo aircraft); and RA 6395 which consolidated and revised the charter of the National Power Corporation.

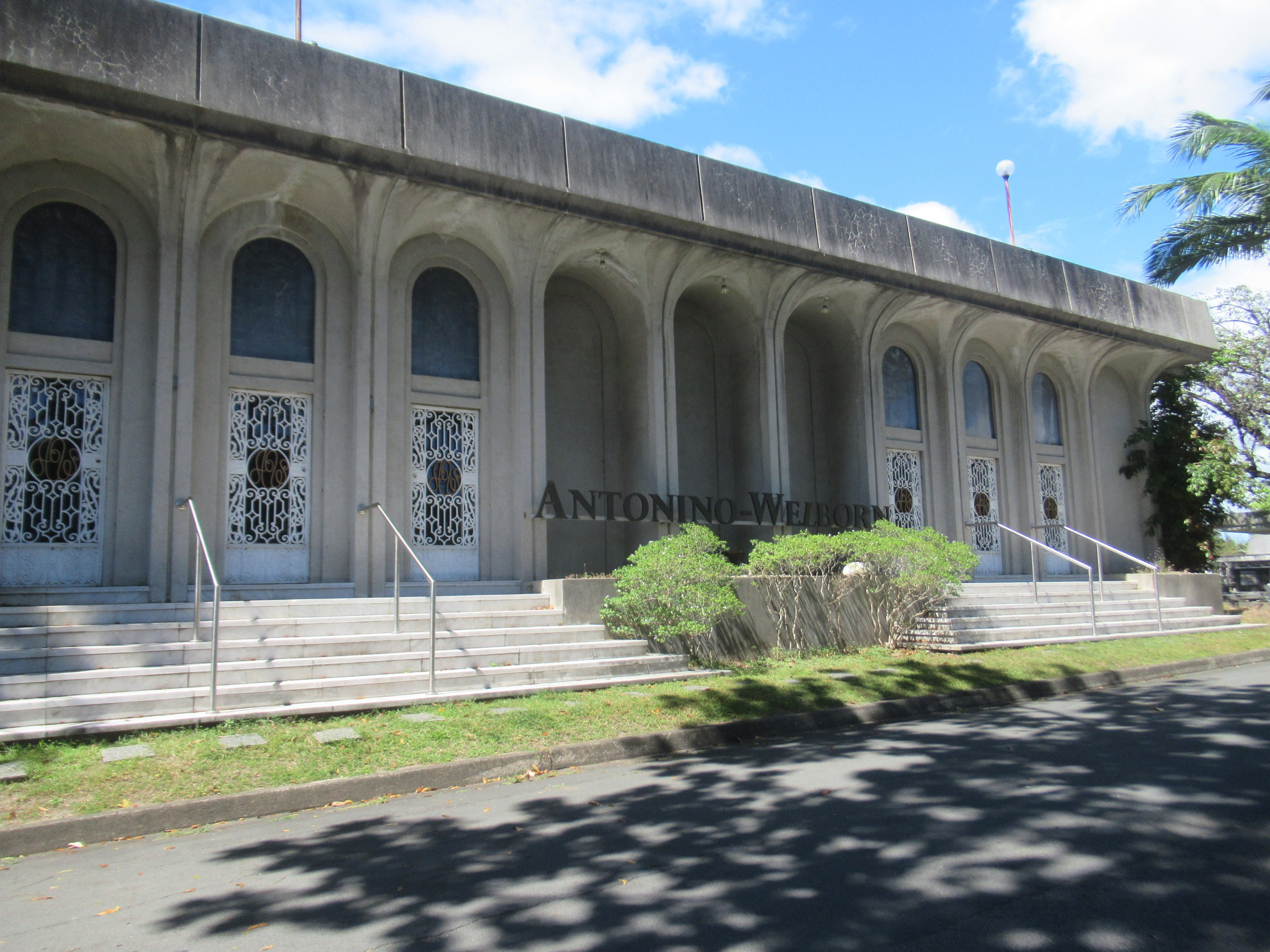
Magnolia & Gaudencio Antonino's mausoleum at the Manila Memorial Park – Sucat.

She also helped enact laws that benefited women and children, farmers through increased production of rice and corn, and people from the government and education sectors.

Antonino was treasurer of the Antonino Construction Enterprises (1946–1953); secretary-treasurer, then manager, Western Mindanao Lumber Co.; general manager, G. E. Antonino, Inc., treasurer, Polytechnic Colleges of the Philippines (modern day Central Colleges of the Phils.); director, Philippine Commercial and Industrial Bank, and Luzon Cement Corporation. She was an officer and member of various social and civic organizations, including Inner Wheel Club of Manila, YWCA, Manila Girl Scouts Council, Philippine Band of Mercy, and Philippine Garden Club.

== Death ==
Antonino died July 22, 2010, at the age of 94.
