= Tampakan =

Municipality in South Cotabato, Philippines

- Municipality
- Municipality of Tampakan

Other transcription(s)
  - Jawi: تمڤاكن
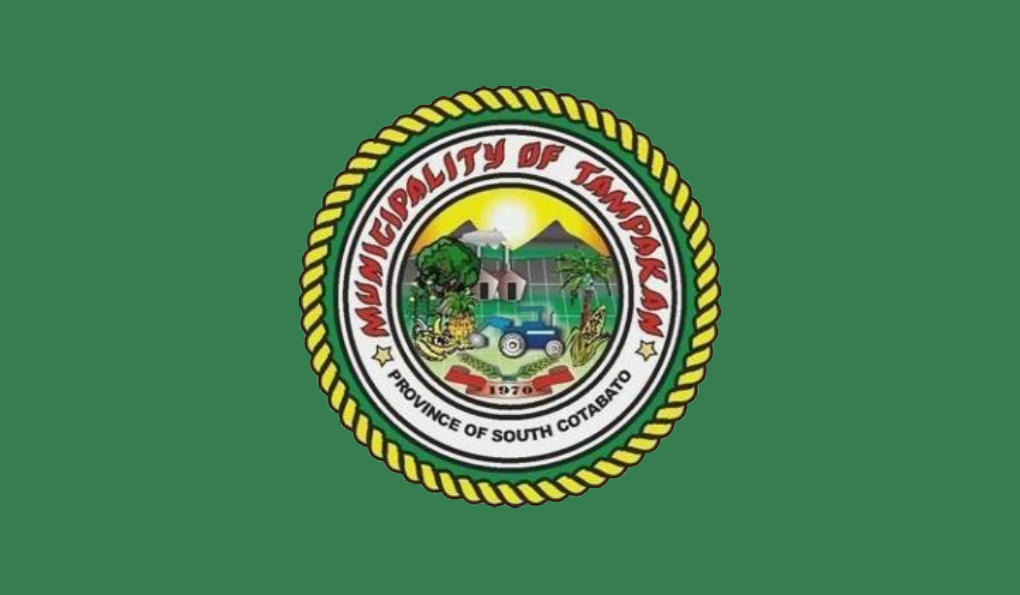
- Flag Seal
- Motto: Mabulawanong Tampakan
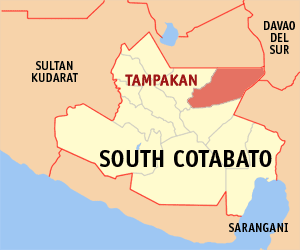
- Map of South Cotabato with Tampakan highlighted
- Interactive map of Tampakan
- Location within the Philippines
- Coordinates: 6°26′38″N 124°55′36″E
- Country: Philippines
- Region: Soccsksargen
- Province: South Cotabato
- District: 1st district
- Founded: June 21, 1970
- Barangays: 14 (see Barangays)

Government
  - Type: Sangguniang Bayan
  - Mayor: Leonard T. Escobillo (ATM-PFP)
  - Vice Mayor: Anadel T. Magbanua (ATM-PFP)
  - South Cotabato 1st District Representative: Isidro D. Lumayag (PFP)
  - Councilors: Michael T. Escobillo (ATM-PFP); John Mark C. Baldon (ATM-PFP); Erve T. Tutor Roy M. Cagas (ATM-PFP); Celso F. Doc (ATM-PFP); Alexey C. Cariaga (ATM-PFP); Anadel T. Magbanua (ATM-PFP); Catherine T. Tabaco (ATM-PFP); Erve T. Tutor (ATM-PFP); Sotero N. Castillanes (ABC Ex Officio); Amay Collado (IPMR Ex Officio); Christian Dave Ho (SK Ex Officio)
  - Electorate: 30,461 voters (2025)

Area
  - Total: 390.00 km^{2} (150.58 sq mi)
- Elevation: 152 m (499 ft)
- Highest elevation: 1,400 m (4,600 ft)
- Lowest elevation: 68 m (223 ft)

Population (2024 census)
  - Total: 42,304
  - Density: 108.47/km^{2} (280.94/sq mi)
  - Households: 10,472

Economy
  - Income class: 1st municipal income class
  - Poverty incidence: 14.57% (2023)
  - Revenue: ₱ 270.7 million (2024)
  - Assets: ₱ 758.7 million (2024)
  - Expenditure: ₱ 252.2 million (2024)
  - Liabilities: ₱ 181.1 million (2024)

Service provider
  - Electricity: South Cotabato 1 Electric Cooperative (SOCOTECO 1)
- Time zone: UTC+8 (PST)
- ZIP code: 9507
- PSGC: 1206314000
- IDD : area code: +63 (0)83
- Native languages: Hiligaynon; Cebuano; Maguindanao; Kalagan; Tagalog
- Website: tampakanscot.gov.ph

Tampakan, officially the Municipality of Tampakan (Hiligaynon: Banwa sang Tampakan; Cebuano: Lungsod sa Tampakan; Ilocano: Ili ti Tampakan; Tagalog: Bayan ng Tampakan; Maguindanaon: Inged nu Tampakan, Jawi: ايڠد نو تمڤاكن), is a municipality in the province of South Cotabato, Philippines. According to the 2024 census, it has a population of 42,304 people.

== History ==
Tampakan was officially created as an independent municipality on June 21, 1969, through Republic Act No. 5661, separating from municipality of Tupi, South Cotabato.

== Government Officials ==
=== Municipal Officials ===
==== Executive Branch ====
===== Mayor =====
No.	Mayor	Party	Start of term	End of term
10	Leonard T. Escobillo, RN	ATM-PFP	June 30, 2019	June 30, 2025

==== Legislative Branch ====
===== Vice-Mayor =====
No.	Mayor	Party	Start of term	End of term
	Ric "Toton" A. Magbanua	ATM-PFP	June 30, 2025	June 30, 2028

===== Councilors =====
District/ League/ Sector	Councilor		Party	Start of term	End of term
	Micheal T. Escobillo	Lone	ATM-PFP	June 30, 2025	June 30, 2028
	John Mark "Bobsi" C. Baldon	Lone	ATM-PFP	June 30, 2022	June 30, 2028
	Erve T. Tutor	Lone	ATM-PFP	June 30, 2019	June 30, 2028
	Roy M. Cagas	Lone	ATM-PFP	June 30, 2019	June 30, 2028
	Celso F. Doc	Lone	ATM-PFP	June 30, 2019	June 30, 2028
	Alexey "Totoy" C. Cariaga	Lone	ATM-PFP	June 30, 2022	June 30, 2028
	Anadel "Dodong" T. Magbanua	Lone	ATM-PFP	June 30, 2025	June 30, 2028
	Catherine T. Tabaco	Lone	ATM-PFP	June 30, 2025	June 30, 2028
	Sotero N. Castillanes	ABC	Nonpartisan	July 8, 2025	December 31, 2025
	Amay Collado	IPMR	Nonpartisan		December 31, 2025
	Christian Dave Ho	SK	Nonpartisan	January 1, 2024	December 31, 2025

=== Barangay Officials ===
Tampakan is politically subdivided into 14 barangays. Each barangay consists of puroks while some have sitios. Brgy. Captain Neil Ryan Escobillo currently serves as the ABC President of Tampakan and concurrently holds the position of ABC President for the Province of South Cotabato. In view of his provincial responsibilities, the ABC Vice President of Tampakan, Brgy. Captain Sotero N. Castillanes, assumes the role of ex officio member representing Tampakan.

There are 3 barangays which classified as urban (highlighted in bold)

Barangay	Barangay Captain	SK Chairman
Albagan	Jito V. Suhot	Trixie Megan Carillo
Buto	Ferdinand S. Encia	Eddie Luie Amora
Danlag	Judith J. Magbanua	Christian Dave Ho (SK President)
**Kipalbig**	Rolando D. Malabuyoc	Jester Cloyd Oñez
Lambayong	Glenn F. Tabano	Vincent Paul Bunga
Liberty	Nolin S. Jalagat	Jorimar Cabañas
Lampitak	Marinillo M. Ngalon	Vanessa Garcia
**Maltana**	Eric Entong	John Rupert Suba
**Poblacion**	Jose Nilo G. Vargas	Ian Clark Cornelio
Palo	Sotero N. Castillanes (ABC Vice President)	Angel Grace Panes
Pula Bato	Neil Ryan T. Escobillo (ABC President - Tampakan & South Cotabato)	Jhemer John Gulay
San Isidro	Armando C. Serida	Sharia Uy
Santa Cruz	Wilfredo M. Epe	
Tablu	Gloria P. Magbanua	Gretz Paul Obaña

=== Former Mayors and Vice Mayors ===
No.	Mayor	Tenure		Vice mayor
1	Anastacio Navato, Sr. (Appointed)	1964 (12 Days)		
2	Ireneo T. Barroso	1964	1980	Alfredo C. Cagas
3	Teodorico N. Josol	March 1980	February 1986	Rosalina C. Villanueva
4	Roberto Y. Barroso, Jr.	February 1986	June 30, 1995	
5	Emilio B. Escobillo, Sr.	June 30, 1995	June 30, 1998	Felixberto A. Solaria
6	Claudius G. Barroso, CPA	June 30, 1998	June 30, 2007	
6	Claudius G. Barroso, CPA	June 30, 1998	June 30, 2007	Pedro A. Cagas
7	Bienvenido G. Barroso, LLB	June 30, 2007	June 30, 2010	Pedro A. Cagas
8	Pedro A. Cagas (Acting)	June 30, 2007	June 30, 2010	
9	Leonardo V. Escobillo, ME	June 30, 2010	June 30, 2019	Relly A. Leysa
9	Leonardo V. Escobillo, ME	June 30, 2010	June 30, 2019	James S. Cagas
10	Leonard T. Escobillo, RN	June 30, 2019	June 30, 2028	John Mark "Bobsi" C. Baldon
10	Leonard T. Escobillo, RN	June 30, 2019	June 30, 2028	Anadel "Dodong" T. Magbanua
10	Leonard T. Escobillo, RN	June 30, 2019	June 30, 2028	Ric "Toton" A. Magbanua

== Climate ==
Tampakan, South Cotabato experiences a relatively mild and consistent climate throughout the year. The average daily maximum temperature ranges from 22 °C to 24 °C (72 °F to 75 °F), while the minimum stays between 15 °C and 17 °C (59 °F to 63 °F). Rainfall is spread across the year, with a total annual precipitation of approximately 1,623 mm (63.9 inches). The wettest months are June to October, each receiving over 180 mm of rain and experiencing 25 to 27 rainy days. In contrast, the driest months are January to March, with rainfall below 60 mm and fewer than 12 rainy days per month. Overall, the climate is cool and wet, especially during the mid-year monsoon season.

Climate data for Tampakan, South Cotabato
Month	Jan	Feb	Mar	Apr	May	Jun	Jul	Aug	Sep	Oct	Nov	Dec	Year
Mean daily maximum °C (°F)	23 (73)	23 (73)	24 (75)	24 (75)	23 (73)	22 (72)	22 (72)	22 (72)	22 (72)	22 (72)	22 (72)	23 (73)	23 (73)
Mean daily minimum °C (°F)	15 (59)	15 (59)	15 (59)	16 (61)	17 (63)	17 (63)	16 (61)	16 (61)	16 (61)	16 (61)	16 (61)	16 (61)	16 (61)
Average precipitation mm (inches)	54 (2.1)	41 (1.6)	56 (2.2)	81 (3.2)	154 (6.1)	212 (8.3)	223 (8.8)	218 (8.6)	192 (7.6)	184 (7.2)	135 (5.3)	73 (2.9)	1,623 (63.9)
Average rainy days	10.4	9.1	11.2	14.4	24.6	27.0	26.7	26.1	25.6	26.9	22.6	15.1	239.7
Source: Meteoblue

== Demographics ==
Tampakan has experienced consistent population growth over the decades. According to the Philippine Statistics Authority, the population rose from 10,731 in 1970 to 41,018 in 2020. The most significant growth occurred between 1970 and 1975, with an annual increase of 8.16%. Growth continued at a steadier pace in the following decades, with the population reaching 18,057 in 1980, 25,526 in 1990, and 33,011 in 2000. While growth persisted into the 21st century, it began to slow, recording 34,245 in 2007, 36,254 in 2010, and 39,525 in 2015. By 2020, the growth rate had declined to 0.73% annually. This gradual deceleration suggests a shift toward population stabilization in recent years.

Population census of Tampakan
Year	Pop.	±% p.a.
1970	10,731	—
1975	15,867	+8.16%
1980	18,057	+2.62%
1990	25,526	+3.52%
1995	28,256	+1.92%
2000	33,011	+3.39%
2007	34,245	+0.51%
2010	36,254	+2.10%
2015	39,525	+1.66%
2020	41,018	+0.78%
2024	42,304	+0.74%
Source: Philippine Statistics Authority

=== Religion ===
Churches in Tampakan:

- Lifehouse Community of Faith, Inc. (SBC), Brgy. Poblacion
- Greenland Community Church (SBC), Brgy. Buto
- Greenview Baptist Church (SBC), Brgy. Buto
- Amazing Grace Baptist Church (SBC), Brgy. Maltana
- Snip Baptist Church (SBC), Brgy. Tablu
- Liberty Baptist Church (SBC), Brgy. Liberty
- Seventh-Day Adventist Church, Brgy. Sta. Cruz
- Kingdom Hall of Jehovah's Witnesses, Brgy. Poblacion
- Born Again Sanctuary of Praise, Brgy. Poblacion
- Iglesia Ni Cristo, Brgy. Poblacion
- Assembly of God Church, Brgy. Poblacion

== Economy ==
Poverty incidence of Tampakan (%)

Source: Philippine Statistics Authority

There is a proposed copper and gold mine in Tampakan. Once approved for operations, the Tampakan Copper-Gold Project will be the largest in the Philippines and among the largest copper mines in the world.

The local government of Tampakan has for now cancelled its agreement with Sagittarius Mines to develop the reserves into a mine in 2020 alleging that the terms of the deal is lopsided against residents and the community
