= Josefa Jara Martinez =

Philippine social worker, suffragist and civic leader

- Born: January 21, 1894; Iloilo, Captaincy General of the Philippines
- Died: April 24, 1987 (aged 93)
- Occupations: Social worker, suffragist and civic leader
- Children: 3, including Amelita Ramos

Josefa Jara Martinez (January 21, 1894 – April 24, 1987) was a Filipino social worker, suffragist and civic leader.

== Life ==
Martinez was born in Iloilo in 1894.

She was educated in the Mandurriao district, Iloilo, before moving to America as a pensionada to attend the New York School of Social Work (now the Columbia University School of Social Work) where she trained as a social worker. She returned to the Philippines after graduating to begin her social work career.

Martinez founded the first school of social work in the Philippines, which was affiliated with the Philippine Women's University, and is now known as the Philippine School of Social Work. She later became the director of the non-governmental agency, the Philippine Rural Reconstruction Movement (PRRM) in Nueva Ecija. She also authored The Evolution of Philippine Social Work.

She was a Protestant belonging to the United Church, and became the executive secretary of the Young Woman's Christian Association of the Philippines. After the death of Josefa Abiertas, Martinez was one of the founders of the Josefa Abiertas House of Friendship in Quezon City, which supported "unwed mothers and fatherless children".

Martinez was also a suffragist who was a member of National Federation of Women's Clubs (NFWC), which led the campaign for women's enfranchisement in the Philippines. A cartoon of her as a suffrage campaigner was published in the Manilla Bulletin newspaper.

== Marriage and children ==
Martinez was married to Rufino Martinez, the Philippines’ first US-trained naval architect, and they had three children: Amelita, Linda and Rori. Their daughter Amelita “Ming” Jara Martinez married Fidel V. Ramos, who was then an army officer, on October 21, 1954. When Ramos became the 12th President of the Philippines, Amelita became First Lady of the Philippines.

== Death ==
Martinez had a stroke at age 89. She died in 1987, at the age of 93.

== Honours ==
In 1978, Martinez was awarded the Social Worker of the Year Award by the governments Professional Regulations Commissions. The public Josefa Jara Martinez High School was named after her.

In 1994, she was featured on a Philippine stamp, and a plaque was erected in her honour at the Philippine Women's University.

In 2006, the biography Mommy: The Life and Times of Josefa Jara Martinez: the Pillar of Social Work in the Philippines by Melandrew Velasco was published, with the book launched at an event at the Orchidarium in Burnham Park, Baguio, Benguet.
