= Luwalhati Antonino =

Filipino politician (1943–2023)

Luwalhati R. Antonino
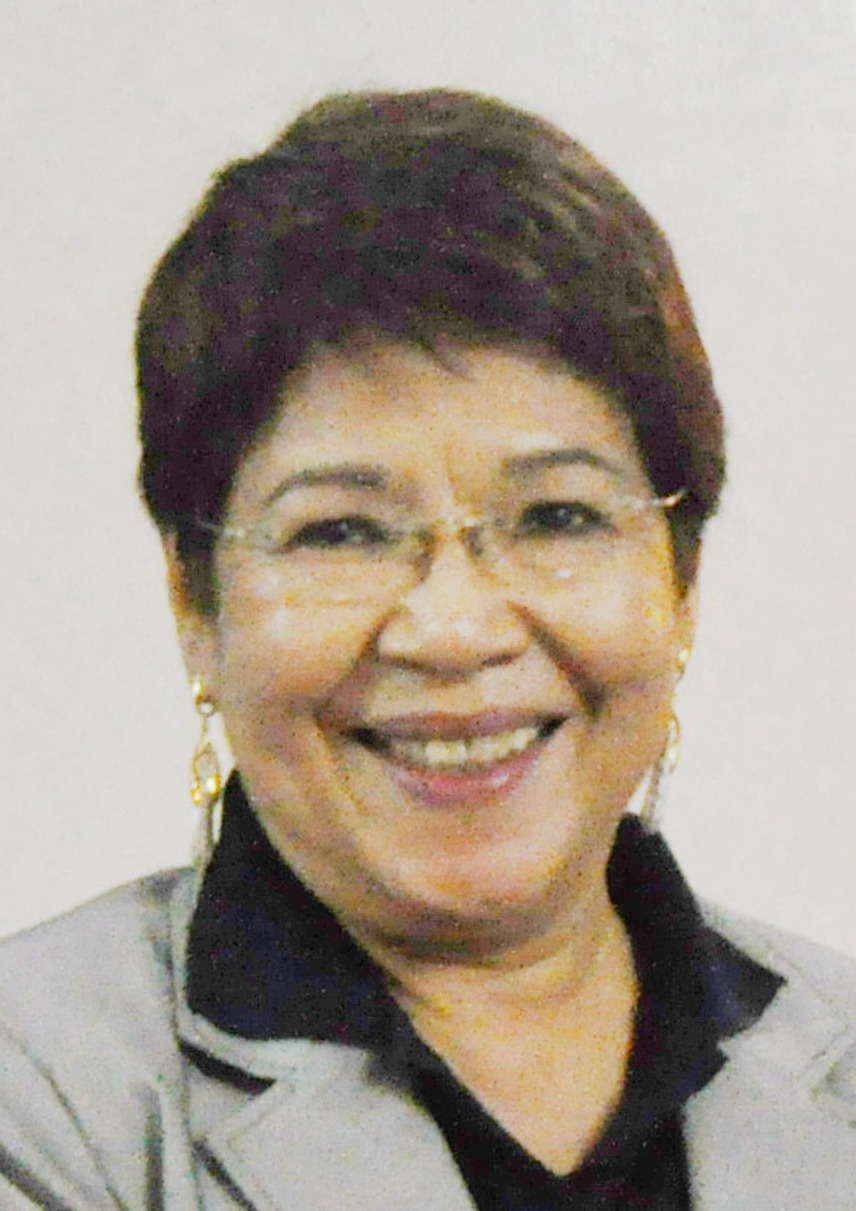
- Antonino, circa 2020

Chairperson of the Mindanao Development Authority
- In office September 12, 2010 – September 9, 2016
- President: Benigno Aquino III; Rodrigo Duterte
- Preceded by: Jesus Dureza
- Succeeded by: Datu Abul Khayr Alonto

Member of the Philippine House of Representatives from South Cotabato's 1st district
- In office June 30, 1992 – June 30, 2001
- Preceded by: Adelbert Antonino
- Succeeded by: Darlene Antonino Custodio

Personal details
- Born: Luwalhati Lopez Ricasa; 22 October 1943 Upi, Cotabato, Philippines (under Japanese occupation)
- Died: 30 October 2023 (aged 80)
- Party: Independent (2001–2023)
- Other political affiliations: LAMMP (1998–2001); Lakas (1992–1998)
- Spouse: Adelbert W. Antonino
- Relations: Magnolia Antonino (mother-in-law)
- Children: Darlene Antonino Custodio; Eliza Bettina R. Antonino
- Education: University of Santo Tomas; New York University

Luwalhati Lopez Ricasa-Antonino (October 22, 1943 – October 30, 2023) was a Filipina politician who served as chairperson of the Mindanao Development Authority (MinDA) from 2010 to 2016 in President Benigno Aquino III's administration. She previously served as a member of the House of Representatives for South Cotabato's 1st district from 1992 to 2001. In the latter office, she was preceded by her husband Adelbert Antonino, and succeeded by her daughter Darlene Antonino Custodio. Her husband and daughter have each also served as mayors of General Santos.

== Political career ==
Antonino served as the representative of the 1st district of South Cotabato for three consecutive terms (9th to 11th Congress) from 1992 to 2001. Within these years, she also served as the president of the Mindanao Lawmakers Association (MLA), a 50-member bloc of representatives from Mindanao.

While in Congress, Antonino held the chairmanship for the Foreign Affairs Committee, and the vice-chairmanship of the Appropriations Committee.

In September 2010, Antonino was appointed by President Benigno Aquino III as chairperson of the Mindanao Development Authority (MinDA), making her the first woman to hold that post.

== Personal life ==
Antonino was born in Upi (now in Maguindanao del Norte) and raised in Kiamba (now in Sarangani)—back then, both towns were in the undivided Cotabato province. Antonino was married to former representative and former mayor of General Santos Adelbert Antonino. Her daughters are former representative and former mayor of General Santos Darlene Antonino Custodio and restaurateur Eliza Bettina R. Antonino.

Antonino earned her bachelor's degree in Chemical Engineering at the University of Santo Tomas and her Masters in Business Administration (MBA) in Economics at New York University. After obtaining her master's, she was hired as an economic and statistical analyst at the United Nations Conference on Trade and Development in New York City.

Antonino died on 30 October 2023, at the age of 80.
