= 1967 Philippine Senate election =

20th Philippine senatorial election

- November 14, 1967

8 (of the 24) seats in the Senate 13 seats needed for a majority
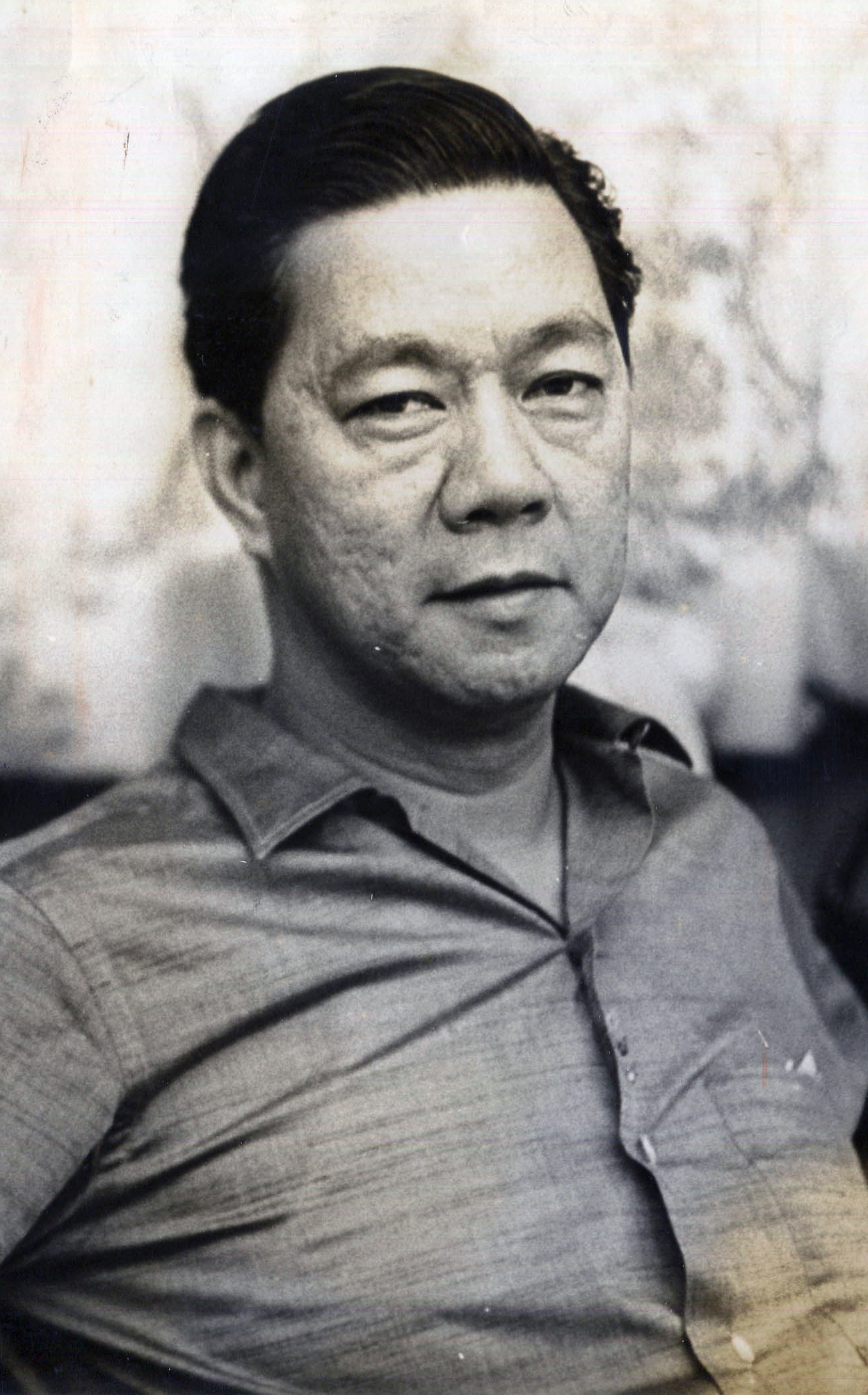

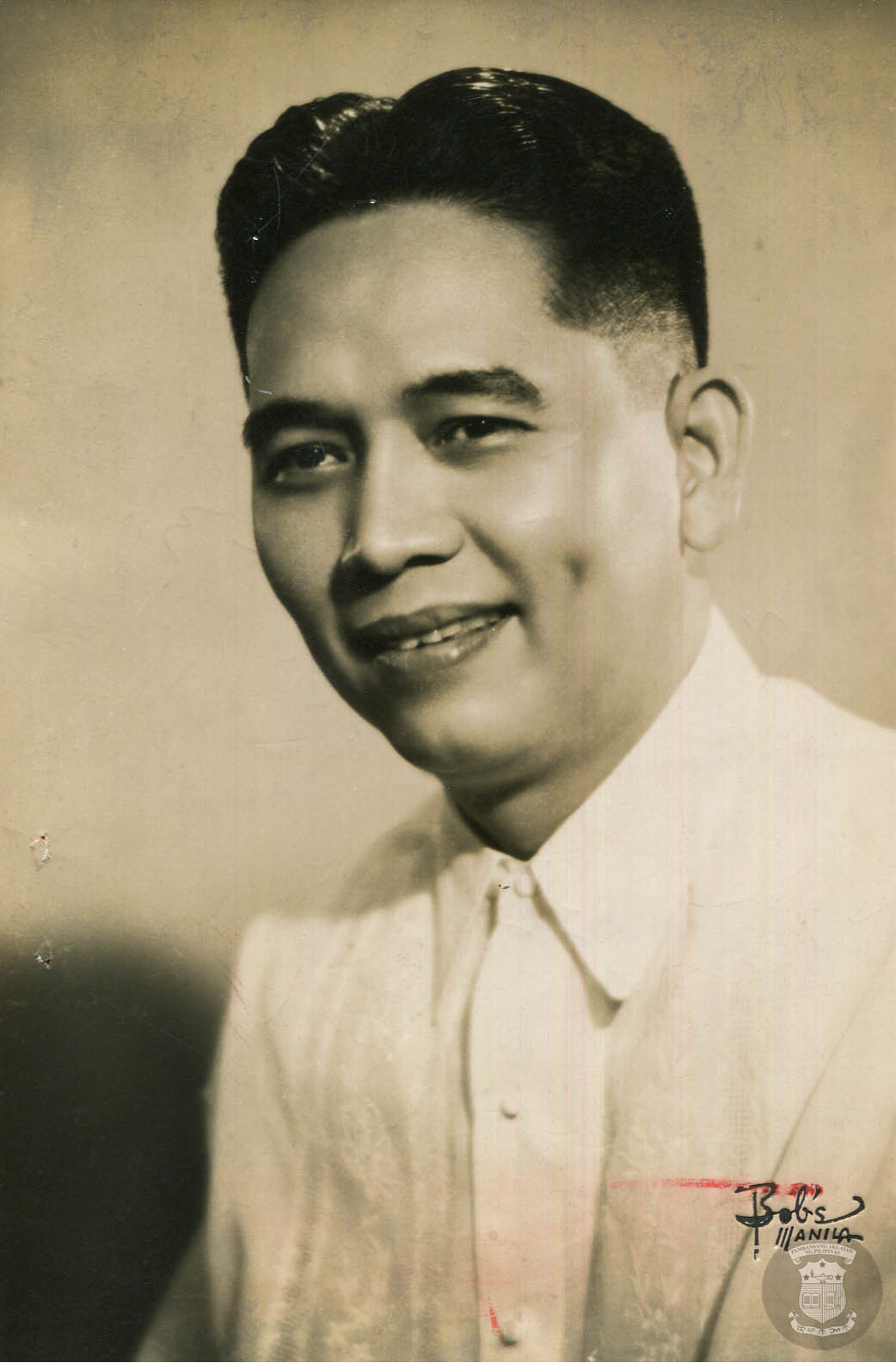

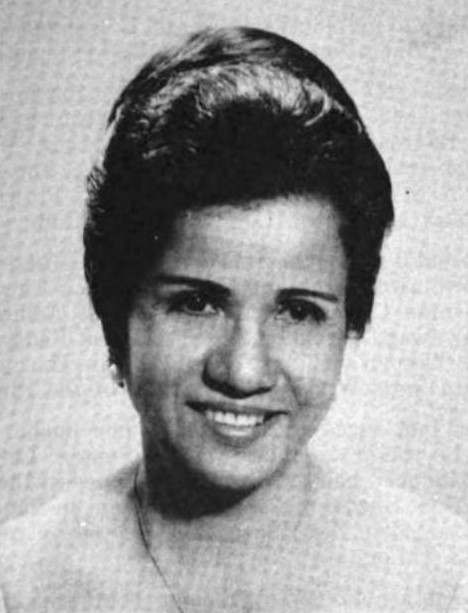
	Majority party	Minority party	Third party
Leader	Gil Puyat	Ambrosio Padilla	Magnolia Antonino
Party	Nacionalista	Liberal	Nacionalista (ind.)
Seats before	11 (2 up)	11 (5 up)	0
Seats won	6	1	1
Seats after	15	7	1
Seat change	▲4	▼4	▲1
Popular vote	27,237,424	18,094,284	3,466,676
Percentage	55.75	37.04	7.10
Swing	▲11.95	▼9.89	▲7.10
Senate President before election
Gil Puyat
Nacionalista
Elected Senate President
Gil Puyat
Nacionalista

The 20th election of members to the Senate of the Philippines was held on November 14, 1967. It was also known as the 1967 midterm election, as the date where the elected candidates take office falls halfway through President Ferdinand Marcos' four-year term. The administration Nacionalista Party won seven seats in the Philippine Senate while the Liberal Party won one seat; the Nacionalistas got the majority in the Senate after having twelve of the 24 seats in the Senate prior to the election.

== Electoral system ==
Philippine Senate elections are held via plurality block voting with staggered elections, with the country as an at-large district. The Senate has 24 seats, of which 8 seats are up every 2 years. The eight seats up were last contested in 1961; each voter has eight votes and can vote up to eight names, of which the eight candidates with the most votes winning the election.

== Retiring incumbents ==
1. Manuel Manahan (Liberal), retired from politics
2. Raul Manglapus (Liberal), ran for senator in 1987 and won
3. Lorenzo Sumulong (Nacionalista), ran for senator in 1969 and won

=== Mid-term vacancies ===
1. Gaudencio Antonino (Nacionalista), died on November 13, 1967

== Results ==
The Nacionalista Party won seven seats, while the Liberal Party won one.

Jose Roy of the Nacionalistas garnered the highest number of votes and was the sole incumbent to defend his seat.

Six winners are neophyte senators. These are the Nacionalistas' Helena Benitez, Salvador Laurel and Leonardo Perez, the Liberals' sole winner Benigno Aquino Jr., and independent candidate Magnolia Antonino, who was the wife of Senator Gaudencio Antonino of the Nacionalistas (originally elected as a Liberal) who died on election eve. She substituted for him and won the election.

Emmanuel Pelaez returns to the Senate, this time under the banner of the Nacionalistas, after last serving in 1959 as a Progressive.

Three Liberal senators lost their seats: Maria Kalaw Katigbak, Camilo Osias, and Soc Rodrigo.

	1	2	3	4	5	6	7	8	9	10	11	12	13	14	15	16	17	18	19	20	21	22	23	24
Before election							‡	‡	‡	‡	‡	‡^	‡	‡										
Election result	Not up						LP	NP (I)	NP						Not up									
After election							*	+	+	+	+	+	*	√										

Key:

- ‡ Seats up
- + Gained by a party from another party
- √ Held by the incumbent
- * Held by the same party with a new senator
- ^ Vacancy

=== Per candidate ===
Candidate	Party	Votes	%
Jose Roy	Nacionalista Party	4,116,549	51.73
Benigno Aquino Jr.	Liberal Party	3,940,529	49.52
Magnolia Antonino (Note: Substituted for her husband Gaudencio Antonino who died a day before the election.)	Nacionalista Party (independent) (Note: Guest candidate of the Nacionalista Party)	3,466,676	43.57
Salvador Laurel	Nacionalista Party	3,459,870	43.48
Leonardo Perez	Nacionalista Party	3,440,011	43.23
Emmanuel Pelaez	Nacionalista Party	3,437,135	43.20
Lorenzo Teves	Nacionalista Party	3,393,952	42.65
Helena Benitez	Nacionalista Party	3,305,585	41.54
Emilio Espinosa Jr.	Nacionalista Party	3,148,904	39.57
Fernando R. Veloso	Nacionalista Party	2,935,418	36.89
Maria Kalaw Katigbak	Liberal Party	2,434,856	30.60
Soc Rodrigo	Liberal Party	2,153,849	27.07
Felixberto Serrano	Liberal Party	2,133,150	26.81
Camilo Osías	Liberal Party	1,991,663	25.03
Larry Henares	Liberal Party	1,959,639	24.63
Roseller T. Lim	Liberal Party	1,790,741	22.51
Jose Briones	Liberal Party	1,678,178	21.09
Asaad Usman	Liberal Party (independent) (Note: Guest candidate of the Liberal Party)	33,642	0.42
Antonio Mendoza	Liberal Party	11,679	0.15
Victorina Cruz	Partido ng Bansa	7,584	0.10
Marcelina Angeles	Partido ng Bansa	3,104	0.04
Paquito Alipio	Partido ng Bansa	2,776	0.03
Segundo Baldon	Partido ng Bansa	2,516	0.03
Victoriano Villaflor	Partido ng Bansa	2,306	0.03
Amado Ordinario	Partido ng Bansa	2,011	0.03
Jose Villavisa	Partido ng Bansa	1,722	0.02
Sergio Olidan	Partido ng Bansa	1,538	0.02
Francisco Quines	Republican Party	269	0.00
Cayetano Bartolini	Independent	160	0.00
Total		48,856,012	100.00
Total votes		7,957,019	–
Registered voters/turnout		9,744,604	81.66

=== Per party ===
Party	Votes	%	+/–	Seats				
Party	Votes	%	+/–	Up	Before	Won	After	+/−
Nacionalista Party	27,237,424	55.75	+11.95	2	11	6	15	+4
Liberal Party	18,094,284	37.04	−9.89	5	11	1	7	−4
Nacionalista Party (independent)	3,466,676	7.10	New	0	0	1	1	+1
Liberal Party (independent)	33,642	0.07	New	0	0	0	0	0
Partido ng Bansa	23,557	0.05	+0.02	0	0	0	0	0
Republican Party	269	0.00	New	0	0	0	0	0
Independent	160	0.00	−0.84	0	0	0	0	0
Nationalist Citizens' Party				0	1	0	1	0
Vacancy				1	1	0	0	−1
Total	48,856,012	100.00	–	8	24	8	24	0
Total votes	7,957,019	–						
Registered voters/turnout	9,744,604	81.66						

Vote share
Nacionalista	55.75%
Liberal	37.04%
Others	7.21%

Senate seats
Nacionalista	75.00%
Liberal	12.50%
Others	12.50%

== Defeated incumbents ==
1. Maria Kalaw Katigbak (Liberal), retired from politics
2. Camilo Osias (Liberal), retired from politics
3. Soc Rodrigo (Liberal), retired from politics

== See also ==
- Also held on this day:
  - 1967 Philippine constitutional plebiscite
  - 1967 Philippine House of Representatives special elections (Davao del Sur's at-large district, Davao Oriental's at-large district, Ilocos Norte's 1st district, Northern Samar's at-large district and South Cotabato's at-large district)
  - 1967 Philippine local elections
  - 1967 Agusan division plebiscite
- 6th Congress of the Philippines
