= Darlene Antonino Custodio =

Filipina politician (born 1973)

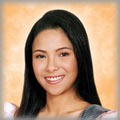

10th Mayor of General Santos
- In office June 30, 2010 – June 30, 2013
- Vice Mayor: Shirlyn Bañas-Nograles
- Preceded by: Pedro Jun Acharon Jr.
- Succeeded by: Ronnel Rivera

Member of the Philippine House of Representatives from South Cotabato's 1st district
- In office June 30, 2001 – June 30, 2010
- Preceded by: Luwalhati Antonino
- Succeeded by: Pedro Acharon, Jr.

Personal details
- Born: Darlene Magnolia Ricasa Antonino; December 26, 1973 (age 52) California, United States
- Party: NPC; AIM
- Parent(s): Luwalhati Antonino; Adelbert Antonino
- Relatives: Gaudencio Antonino (grandfather); Magnolia Antonino (grandmother)
- Occupation: Politician
- Website: Official Website

Darlene Magnolia Ricasa Antonino-Custodio (born December 26, 1973) is a Filipina former politician who served as mayor of General Santos from 2010 to 2013 and as the Representative of South Cotabato's 1st district from 2001 to 2010.

She gained national attention in the 2007 elections when she defeated world boxing champion Manny Pacquiao in his first foray into politics.

== Early life and education ==
Antonino was born on December 26, 1973, in California, United States. She graduated high school at O.B Montessori, Manila in 1992. She finished her college degree in B.S. Business Management in De La Salle University in 1996. She holds a master's degree in Culinary Arts in the prestigious school Le Cordon Bleu in London, England.

== Career ==
She belongs to the NPC-AIM party and served as the House Deputy Minority Leader in the 13th Congress of the Philippines.

In the May 14, 2007, elections, she defeated her challenger and future representative Manny Pacquiao by more than thirty thousand votes.

On May 10, 2010, she ran for the mayoralty of General Santos and won.

On May 14, 2013, she was defeated by councilor Ronnel Rivera in her bid for a second term as Mayor of General Santos in the 2013 elections.

She has not participated in local politics since her 2013 defeat. In November 2021, addressing speculations of a political comeback in the 2022 elections, Antonino Custodio announced that she was not running for mayor of General Santos. She was also unhappy with the political situation in the country, citing "party politics has been erased and shifted to personality politics."

== Personal life ==
Antonino comes from New Manila, Quezon City. Her father and mother, Adelbert and Luwalhati R. Antonino both served as mayor and house representative of General Santos and South Cotabato. She is also the granddaughter of Senators Gaudencio and Magnolia Antonino. Her great-grandfather, Magnolia's father, was an American.

She is married to Benjamin Custodio, a businessman.

== Credits ==
TV appearances:

- Proudly Filipina (2007)
- Up Close and Personal (2007)
- Totoo TV (2008)
