= Ronnel Rivera =

Filipino politician (born 1971)

11th Mayor of General Santos
- In office June 30, 2013 – June 30, 2022
- Vice Mayor: Shirlyn Bañas-Nograles (2013–2019); Loreto Acharon (2019–2022)
- Preceded by: Darlene Antonino-Custodio
- Succeeded by: Lorelie G. Pacquiao

Member of the General Santos City Council
- In office June 30, 2010 – June 30, 2013

Personal details
- Born: Ronnel Chua Rivera; September 1, 1971 (age 55) General Santos, South Cotabato
- Party: Nacionalista (2021–present); Regional Communities Reforms Initiatives (2022–present)
- Other political affiliations: Independent (2010-2012); PCM (2012–2021); UNA (2012–2018); PDP–Laban (2016–2021)
- Spouse: Jane G. Rivera
- Relations: Rodrigo E. Rivera, Sr. (father); Dolores Chua-Rivera (mother)
- Education: University of San Carlos; University of the Philippines Diliman
- Profession: Businessman

Ronnel "Nel" Rivera (born September 1, 1971) is a Filipino politician, entrepreneur, businessman, and former city councilor (2010–2013) and mayor of General Santos (2013–2022). In the 2022 elections, he ran for the position as the first-ever lone representative of General Santos, but lost to his vice mayor Loreto Acharon. He is the son of Rodrigo E. Rivera Sr. the owner of RD Pawnshop Inc., one of the largest pawnshop companies in the Philippines.
