= Young Women's Christian Association of the Philippines =

Organization

- Headquarters: 880 United Nations Avenue, Manila
- Coordinates: 14.584560, 120.990358
- Members: (1926)
- President: Mrs. Lila A. Fariñas
- National Executive Director: Mrs. Neriza B. Llena

The Young Women's Christian Association of the Philippines (YWCA of the Philippines) is an autonomous member of World YWCA. The association was established in the Philippines in 1926.

== History ==
In 1921, Felicisima Balgos Barza, with assistance from the Honolulu YWCA, formed the Time Investment Club. The YWCA of Manila was formally organized in October 1926. The first honorary president was Aurora A. Quezon.

The organization of the Baguio and San Pablo YWCAs took place in 1946-47 and the first YWCA National Convention was held in 1948. This led to the recognized need for forming an umbrella organization, which consequently became the YWCA of the Philippines, conceived to serve as a coordinating body for organized local clubs that had begun to proliferate. In the 1950s, the executive secretary was social worker Josefa Jara Martinez.

The YWCA of the Philippines was admitted as a corresponding member of the World YWCA during the World Council Meeting in Hanchow, China in 1948. It became an active member at the World Council meeting in Beirut, Lebanon in 1951.

The YWCA of the Philippines policy making is vested on a 17 member National Council headed by the President while the national staff headed by the National Executive Director does the implementation work.

The YWCA sponsors groups such as the Y-Buds which consists of elementary school girls, the Y-teens organized in secondary schools and the Student Y organized in colleges and universities. Furthermore there are the Young Professionals and the Adult Y'ers.

There is also the Community Youth Club whose members could either be in school or out-of-school.

== National Council Officers 2022-2024 ==
National President: Atty. Bienvenida A. Gruta
Vice President for Administration & Management: Dr. Emee Espina Saplada
Vice President for Program & Membership: Francine Beatriz DG Pradez (young woman)
Vice President for Finance: Marcia Suzanne O. Bicomong
Secretary: Jessica M. Deboton (young woman)
Assistant Secretary: Cynthia H. Alegria (young woman)
Treasurer: Jennelyn R. Cadavos (young woman)
Assistant Treasurer: Alliana Marie B. Archivido (young woman)
P.R.O: Rizalyn T. Ambida
National Executive Director: Neriza Bernardo-Llena, RSW

== National Council Members ==
Marla May A. Baes - Young Woman
Grace S. Frias-
Dr. Edesa S. Grama
Jayle B. Manalo - Young Woman
Lovely May Y. Nemenzo -young woman
Dr. Leonida Bayani-Ortiz, Chairperson-Council of Past National Presidents
Judy S. Suegay
Maribeth G. Tayag
