= General Santos's at-large congressional district =

House of Representatives of the Philippines congressional district

- Constituency for the House of Representatives of the Philippines
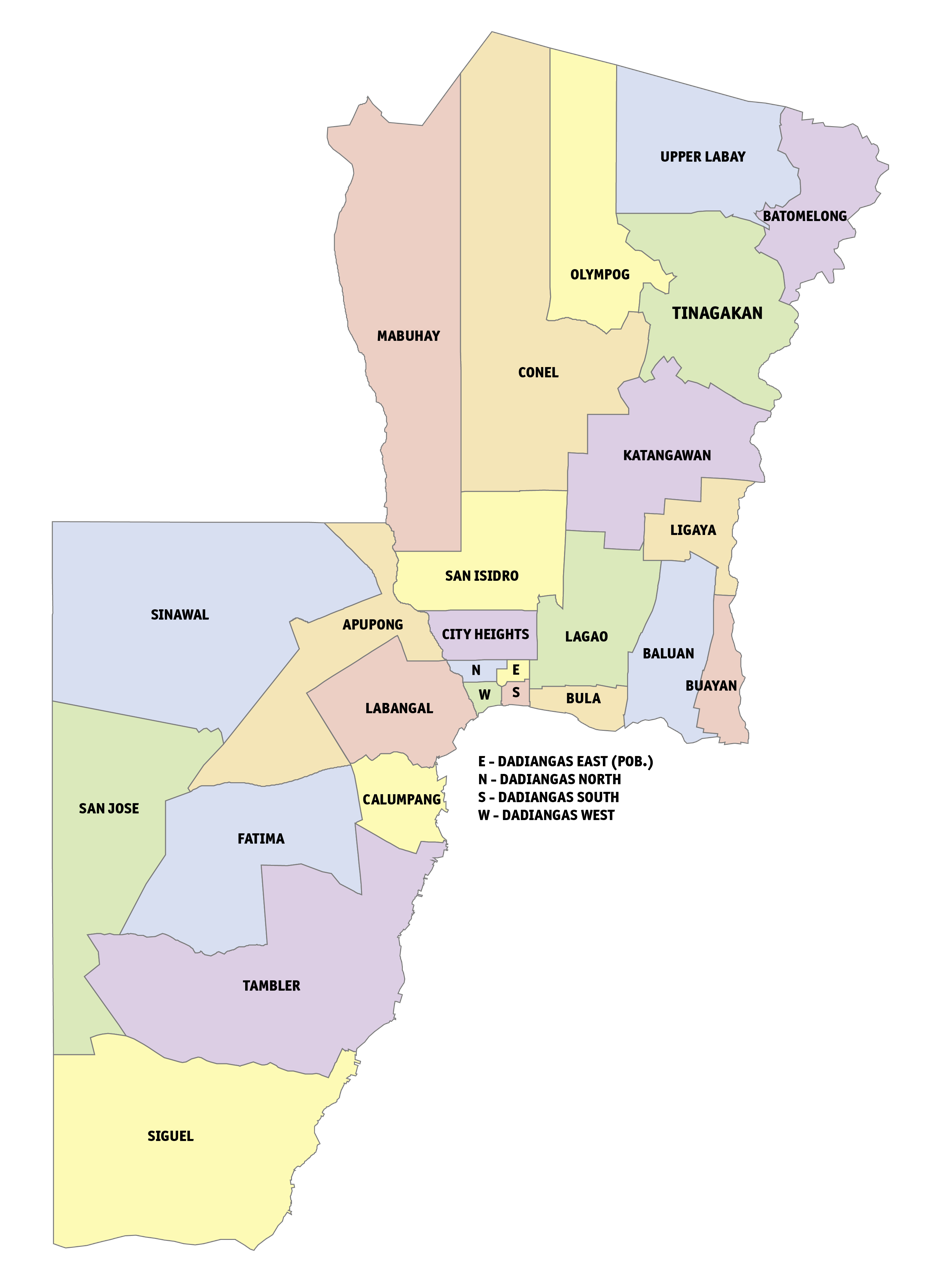
- Boundary of General Santos's lone congressional district

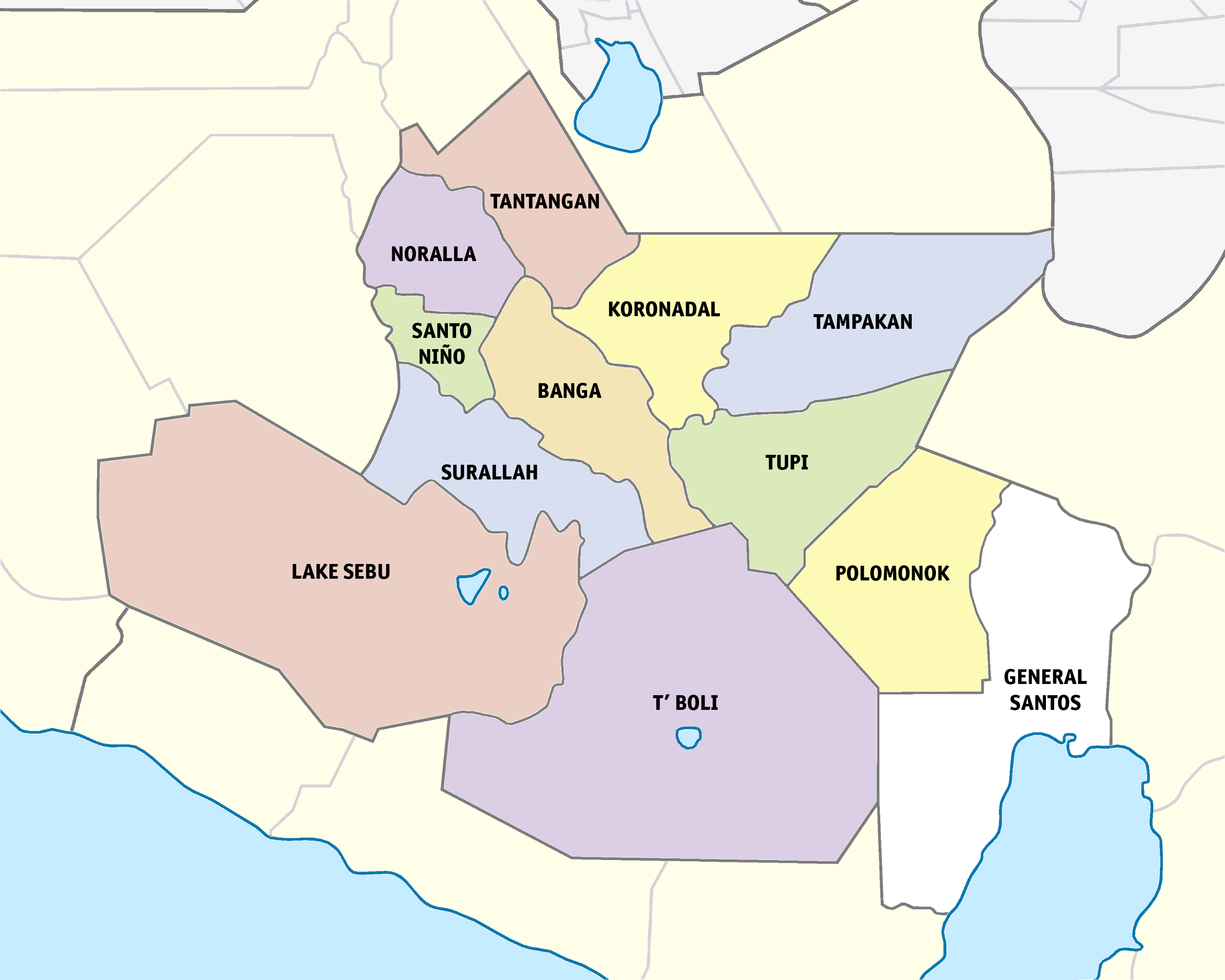
- Location of General Santos within South Cotabato.
- City: General Santos
- Region: Soccsksargen
- Population: 722,059 (2024)
- Electorate: 368,454 (2025)
- Major settlements: General Santos
- Area: 492.86 km^{2} (190.29 sq mi)

Current constituency
- Created: 2022
- Representative: Shirlyn Bañas-Nograles
- Political party: PDP
- Congressional bloc: Majority

The General Santos's at-large congressional district is the single representation of the highly urbanized city of General Santos. It has been represented in the House of Representatives of the Philippines since 2022. It is currently represented in the 20th Congress by Shirlyn Bañas-Nograles of the Partido Demokratiko Pilipino (PDP).

== History ==
Prior to gaining separate representation, areas now under the jurisdiction of General Santos were represented under the Department of Mindanao and Sulu (1917–1935), the historical Cotabato Province (1935–1967), Region XI (1978–1984) and South Cotabato (lone district, 1967–1972; at-large district, 1984–1986; first district, 1987–2019).

Even after becoming a highly urbanized city independent from South Cotabato in 1988, General Santos remained part of the province's congressional representation. The city only gained a separate representative with the passage of Republic Act No. 11243 on March 11, 2019, which segregated General Santos from the first congressional district of South Cotabato to form its own congressional district.

Given that it was already too late for the Commission on Elections to change the old congressional district configuration data in the automated election system in time for the May 2019 polls, COMELEC Resolution No. 10524 was promulgated on April 11, 2019, to delay the elections for both the new lone congressional district of General Santos and the newly reconfigured first congressional district of South Cotabato to a date no less than six months from May 13, 2019. By virtue of COMELEC Resolution No. 10552 promulgated on July 25, 2019, the date of elections for the lone district of General Santos was set for October 26, 2019.

However, on September 10, 2019, the Supreme Court of the Philippines declared COMELEC Resolution No. 10524 null and void for violating the law, when COMELEC set separate special elections for the reconfigured 1st Congressional District of South Cotabato and the newly created Lone Congressional District of General Santos instead of using the new district boundaries in the next regular (i.e., 2022) election, as RA 11243 intended. In the same ruling, the Supreme Court ordered COMELEC to convene a Special Provincial Board of Canvassers to proclaim the winning candidate, Shirlyn L. Bañas-Nograles who garnered 68.55% of the votes cast in the May 2019 election, as the duly elected representative of the 1st Congressional District of South Cotabato, including General Santos.

The Supreme Court ruling effectively sets the election of the first separate representative for General Santos to the 2022 elections.

Subsection C in the Section 1 of the Republic Act No. 11243 that designated General Santos as South Cotabato's third district caused confusion of the bill's title, Consequently, Representative Ferdinand Hernandez filed the House Bill No. 10021 that officially mandate and legally clarify the City of General Santos as a lone district, separate from South Cotabato. It passed in the third and final reading in the House on September 15, 2021 and in the Senate on January 31, 2022 with an amendment where the first election for the reapportioned seats will be on May 12, 2025. The bill lapsed into a law without then-President Rodrigo Duterte's signature on June 2, 2022, and was indexed under the Republic Act No. 11804.

== Representation history ==
| # | Image | Member | Term of office | | Congress | Party | Electoral history |
| # | Image | Member | Start | End | Congress | Party | Electoral history |
|---|---|---|---|---|---|---|---|
=== General Santos's at-large district for the House of Representatives of the Philippines ===
District created June 2, 2022.
| 1 | | Loreto Acharon | June 30, 2022 | June 30, 2025 | 19th | NPC | Elected in 2022. |
| 2 | | Shirlyn Bañas-Nograles | June 30, 2025 | Incumbent | 20th | PDP | Elected in 2025. |

== See also ==
- Legislative district of Mindanao and Sulu
- Legislative district of Cotabato
- Legislative districts of Sarangani
- Legislative districts of South Cotabato
- Legislative districts of Sultan Kudarat
