= Legislative districts of Sarangani =

Districts in Philippine province

The legislative districts of Sarangani are the representations of the province of Sarangani in the Congress of the Philippines. The province is currently represented in the lower house of the Congress through its lone congressional district.

== History ==
Prior to gaining separate representation, areas now under the jurisdiction of Sarangani were represented under the Department of Mindanao and Sulu (1917–1935), the undivided province of Cotabato (1935–1967), Region XI (1978–1984) and South Cotabato (1967–1972; 1984–1995).

The passage of Republic Act No. 7228 on March 16, 1992 and its subsequent ratification by plebiscite on May 19, 1992 separated the entire third district of South Cotabato to form the new province of Sarangani. South Cotabato's former third district automatically became the representation of Sarangani upon its establishment in 1992, but the new province only elected a representative under its own name beginning in 1995.

== Lone District ==
- Population (2020): 558,946

Period	Representative
10th Congress; 1995–1998	James L. Chiongbian
11th Congress; 1998–2001	vacant (Note: Seat vacant for the entirety of the 11th Congress. Juan Domino garnered the most votes in the 1998 election but was not allowed to take his seat; he was later disqualified for lack of residency. No special elections were conducted to fill the seat.)
12th Congress; 2001–2004	Erwin L. Chiongbian
13th Congress; 2004–2007	Erwin L. Chiongbian
14th Congress; 2007–2010	Erwin L. Chiongbian
15th Congress; 2010–2013	Emmanuel "Manny" D. Pacquiao
16th Congress; 2013–2016	Emmanuel "Manny" D. Pacquiao
17th Congress; 2016–2019	Rogelio D. Pacquiao
18th Congress; 2019–2022	Rogelio D. Pacquiao
19th Congress; 2022–2025	Steve C. Solon

== See also ==
- Legislative district of Mindanao and Sulu
- Legislative district of Cotabato
- Legislative districts of South Cotabato
