= Tupi, South Cotabato =

Municipality in South Cotabato, Philippines

Tupi
- Municipality
- Municipality of Tupi

Other transcription(s)
  - Jawi: توڤي
- Municipal Hall

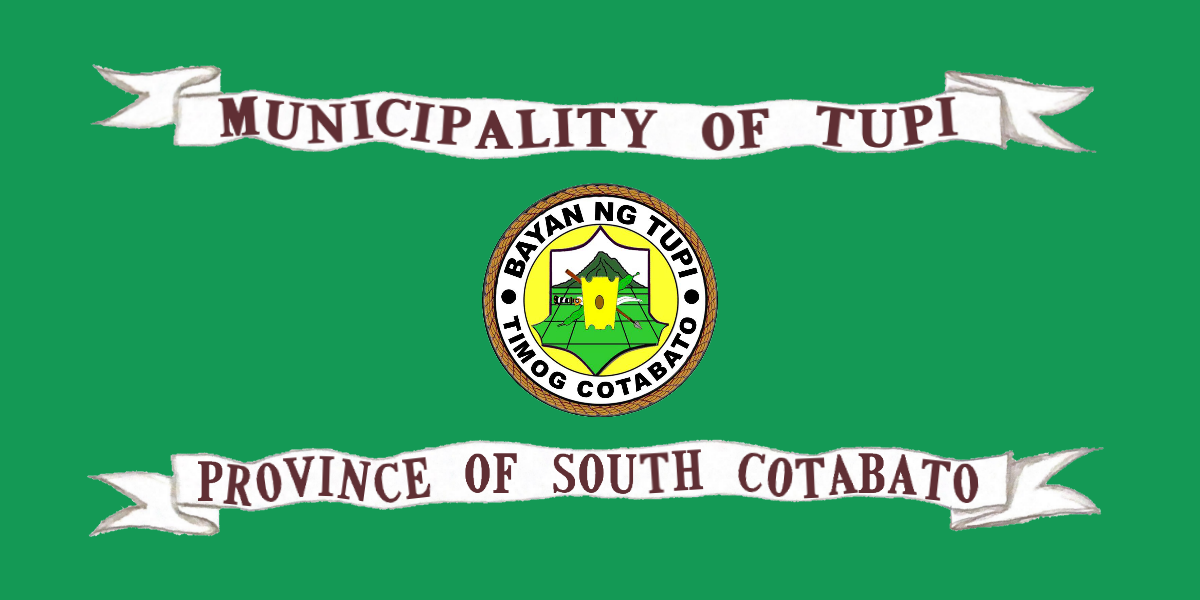
- Flag Seal
- Nickname(s): Fruit, Flower and Vegetable Basket of South Cotabato
- Motto: WOW TUPI!
- Anthem: Tupi Hymn
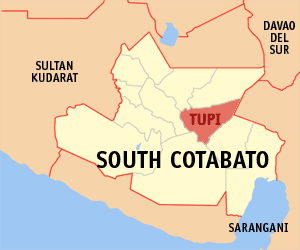
- Map of South Cotabato with Tupi highlighted
- Interactive map of Tupi
- Location within the Philippines
- Coordinates: 6°20′N 124°57′E
- Country: Philippines
- Region: Soccsksargen
- Province: South Cotabato
- District: 1st district
- Founded: September 11, 1953
- Barangays: 16 (see Barangays)

Government
  - Type: Sangguniang Bayan
  - Mayor: Romeo S. Tamayo
  - Vice Mayor: Glenn C. Hatulan
  - Representative: Isidro D. Lumayag
  - Municipal Council: Members: Rubi D. Hatulan-Navarro; Jasper C. Solilapsi; Wendy A. Duarte; Glezel D. Mariano-Trabado; Marvin M. Zabala; Weynard John B. Cornejo; Ruel D. Marcelino; Joselito G. Yabut
  - Electorate: 50,301 voters (2025)

Area
  - Total: 228.00 km^{2} (88.03 sq mi)
- Elevation: 365 m (1,198 ft)
- Highest elevation: 735 m (2,411 ft)
- Lowest elevation: 162 m (531 ft)

Population (2024 census)
  - Total: 78,599
  - Density: 344.73/km^{2} (892.85/sq mi)
  - Households: 18,355

Economy
  - Income class: 1st municipal income class
  - Poverty incidence: 18.3% (2023)
  - Revenue: ₱ 359.5 million (2024)
  - Assets: ₱ 897.7 million (2024)
  - Expenditure: ₱ 314.5 million (2024)
  - Liabilities: ₱ 386.1 million (2024)

Service provider
  - Electricity: South Cotabato 2 Electric Cooperative (SOCOTECO 2)
- Time zone: UTC+8 (PST)
- ZIP code: 9505
- PSGC: 1206317000
- IDD : area code: +63 (0)83
- Native languages: Hiligaynon; Cebuano; Maguindanao; Blaan; Tagalog
- Website: www.tupi.gov.ph

Tupi, officially the Municipality of Tupi (Hiligaynon: Banwa sang Tupi; Cebuano: Lungsod sa Tupi; Tagalog: Bayan ng Tupi; Kapampangan: Balen ning Tupi; Maguindanaon: Inged nu Tupi, Jawi: ايڠد نو توڤي), is a municipality in the province of South Cotabato, Philippines. According to the 2024 census, it has a population of 78,599 people.

Nestled at the foot of a dormant volcano, Mount Matutum, Tupi is considered as the fruit, vegetable and flower basket of South Cotabato.

== History ==
The name "Tupi" is derived from the word "Tufi" which was a vine chewed by native Blaan tribes who first inhabited the land.

In 1936 during the commonwealth government, President Manuel L. Quezon appointed Major General Paulino Santos as General Manager for the development of Koronadal and the Allah Valley. Settlers from Luzon and the Visayas transformed the previously forested area into an agricultural zone.

The Barrio of Tupi was created into a municipality by virtue of executive order 612 of President Elpidio Quirino on September 11, 1953. The first set of appointed officials were inducted on October 2 of that year.

== Geography ==
=== Barangays ===
Tupi is politically subdivided into 16 barangays. Each barangay consists of puroks while some have sitios.

On July 13, 2024, despite having a low voter turnout of only 25.45%, majority of voters ratified the creation of Barangay Juan-Loreto Tamayo, which was carved out of the barangays of Cebuano, Linan, and Miasong. The Commission on Elections announced that of the 2,485 participating voters, 2,393 or 96.30% voted "Yes", while only 89 or 3.58% voted "No". The new barangay is named after the grandparents of former mayor and incumbent South Cotabato governor Reynaldo Tamayo Jr..

- Acmonan
- Bololmala
- Bunao
- Cebuano
- Crossing Rubber
- Juan-Loreto Tamayo
- Kablon
- Kalkam
- Linan
- Lunen
- Miasong
- Palian
- Poblacion
- Polonuling
- Simbo
- Tubeng

=== Climate ===
Climate data for Tupi, South Cotabato
Month	Jan	Feb	Mar	Apr	May	Jun	Jul	Aug	Sep	Oct	Nov	Dec	Year
Mean daily maximum °C (°F)	29 (84)	29 (84)	29 (84)	30 (86)	29 (84)	28 (82)	28 (82)	28 (82)	28 (82)	28 (82)	28 (82)	29 (84)	29 (83)
Mean daily minimum °C (°F)	21 (70)	21 (70)	21 (70)	22 (72)	23 (73)	22 (72)	22 (72)	22 (72)	22 (72)	22 (72)	22 (72)	22 (72)	22 (72)
Average precipitation mm (inches)	54 (2.1)	41 (1.6)	56 (2.2)	81 (3.2)	154 (6.1)	212 (8.3)	223 (8.8)	218 (8.6)	192 (7.6)	184 (7.2)	135 (5.3)	73 (2.9)	1,623 (63.9)
Average rainy days	10.4	9.1	11.2	14.4	24.6	27.0	26.7	26.1	25.6	26.9	22.6	15.1	239.7
Source: Meteoblue

== Demographics ==
Population census of Tupi
Year	Pop.	±% p.a.
1960	19,945	—
1970	22,874	+1.38%
1975	28,423	+4.45%
1980	31,591	+2.14%
1990	43,232	+3.19%
1995	46,656	+1.44%
2000	53,440	+2.95%
2007	57,779	+1.08%
2010	61,843	+2.50%
2015	69,976	+2.38%
2020	73,459	+1.03%
2024	78,599	+1.64%
Source: Philippine Statistics Authority

== Economy ==
Poverty incidence of Tupi (%)

Source: Philippine Statistics Authority

Tupi's climate and soil type makes it suitable to all types of crop and livestock production. Tupi aside from pineapple, tropical fruits and vegetables is identified as suited for high-value commercial crops (HVCC) like asparagus and papaya. Cut-flower production is one crop that is putting Tupi on the regional map. Tupi is likewise identified as one of the areas in the province well suited for poultry production. To date, there are around 34 major poultry raisers scattered in the municipality with minimum of 10,000 heads capacity. Tupi had been identified in the Soccsksargen Growth Plan as one of the areas where a satellite Food Terminal shall be located. To date, a private organization, the DARBCI initiated the establishment of an initial 70 hectare Economic Zone within the Municipality of Tupi. One of the future investment eyed as an economic booster is the establishment of an Integrated Food Terminal. On this aspect, private investors are welcome to finance major economic endeavors within the economic zone.

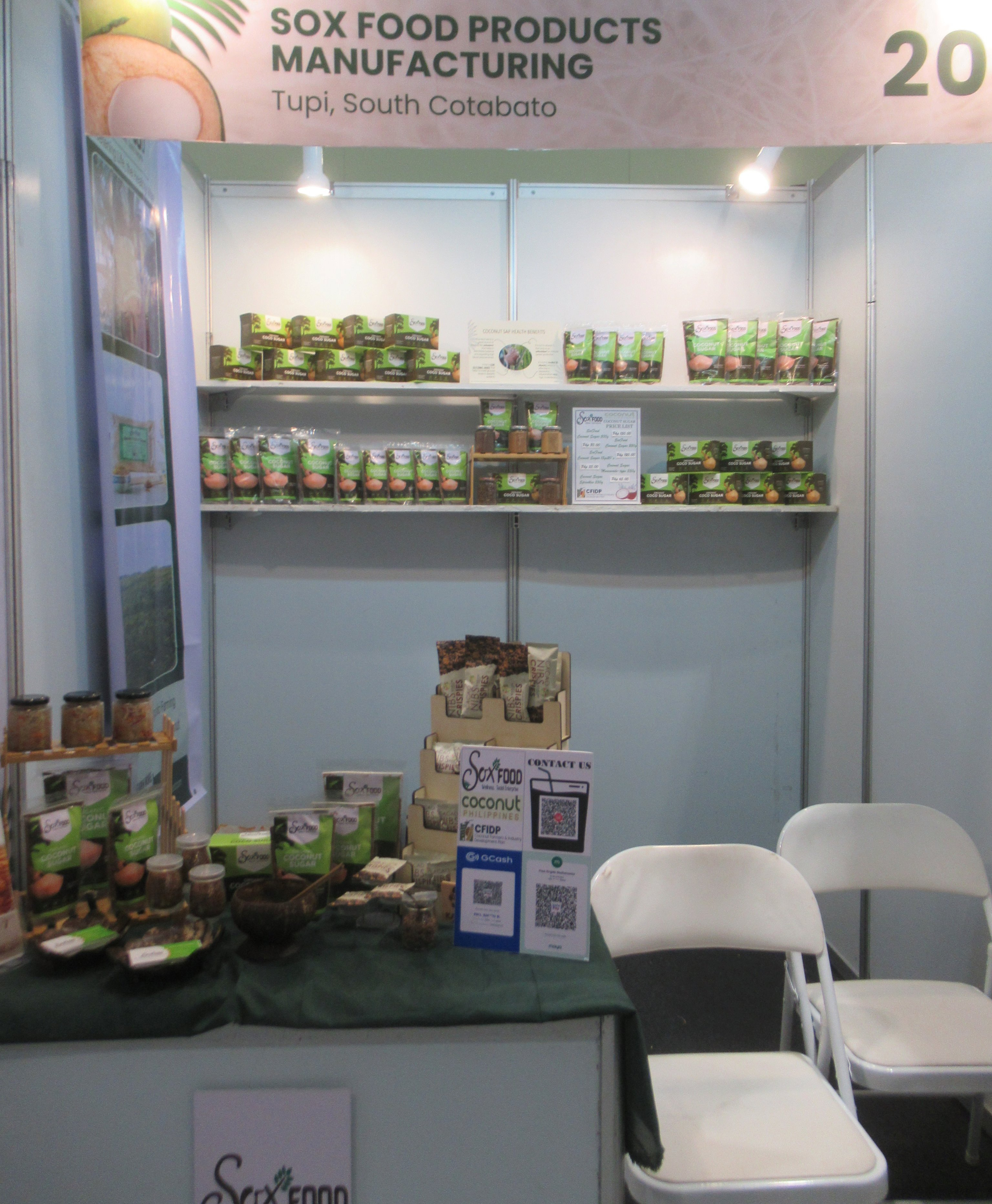
SOX Food Products in Palian

Tupi, which is basically an agricultural municipality, devotes 19% of its total land area to agricultural production. Major agricultural crops are pineapple, papaya, asparagus, fruits, vegetables, corn, coffee, bananas, cut-flowers. Other high value commercial products include wood products and processed food.

The exports products are pineapple, asparagus, bottled fruit preserves, and Bongolan Banana.

The existing major business establishments are Progressive Farms, Kablon Farms, Stanfilco of Dole Philippines, Blooming Petals, Inc., Eden's Flowers, Central Universal Corporation and other large scale livestock and poultry raisers distributed all over the municipality.

== Arts and culture ==
- Kasadyahan Festival, "Sagana Sayaw sa Kadalanan-Kasadyahan": Celebration featuring street dancing competition coined from Visayan word "Kasadya". It is a convergence of various ethnic and cultural dances featuring Tupi as the province's flower, fruit and vegetable basket and a town where various cultures abode. Held every September 11 in celebration of the town's foundation anniversary.
- Linggo ng Matutum: A weeklong festivity every March 13–20 of each year in celebration of the declaration of Mt. Matutum as protected Landscape: highlighting "Amyak Maleh", a climb and plant mountaineering activities and the Mindanao wide "Amyak Maleh Mt Matutum Bike Challenge".
- Kariton Festival: Annual parade of animal-drawn carts (kariton) bedecked with vegetables, fruits and flowers. Held every October and is being sponsored by the barangay Poblacion.
- Ati-Atihan: A yearly festival of Barangay Crossing Rubber same with that of Kalibo, Aklan.

== Infrastructure ==
=== Transportation ===
The Tupi Transport Terminal has its daily trip to General Santos and Koronadal City 24 hours daily. The estimated time allotment from Tupi to General Santos and vice versa is only 45~60 minutes without traffic. From General Santos, there are trips to Tupi, the PUVs are available at the mall terminals and public terminal.

General Santos International Airport is 1 hour away from Tupi's town proper by using the newly constructed General Santos Diversion Road to avoid heavy traffic in General Santos City (Dadiangas), South Cotabato.
