= South Cotabato's 1st congressional district =

Legislative district of the Philippines

- Constituency for the House of Representatives of the Philippines
- Map
- Location of South Cotabato within the Philippines
- Province: South Cotabato
- Region: Soccsksargen
- Population: 297,574 (2024)
- Electorate: 195,438 (2025)
- Major settlements: 3 LGUs: Municipalities; Polomolok; Tampakan; Tupi
- Area: 957.97 km^{2} (369.87 sq mi)

Current constituency
- Created: 1987
- Representative: Isidro D. Lumayag
- Political party: PFP
- Congressional bloc: Majority

South Cotabato's 1st congressional district is one of the two congressional districts of the Philippines in the province of South Cotabato. It has been represented in the House of Representatives since 1987. The district covers its southern municipalities of Polomolok, Tampakan and Tupi, and, until 2022, the independent city of General Santos. It is currently represented in the 20th Congress by Isidro Lumayag of the Partido Federal ng Pilipinas.

== Representation history ==
#	Image	Member	Term of office		Congress	Party	Electoral history	Constituent LGUs
#	Image	Member	Start	End	Congress	Party	Electoral history	Constituent LGUs
=== South Cotabato's 1st district for the House of Representatives of the Philippines ===
District created February 2, 1987 from South Cotabato's at-large district.
1		Adelbert W. Antonino	June 30, 1987	June 30, 1992	8th	LDP	Elected in 1987.	1987–2022; General Santos, Polomolok, Tampakan, Tupi
2		Luwalhati Antonino	June 30, 1992	June 30, 2001	9th	Lakas	Elected in 1992.	1987–2022; General Santos, Polomolok, Tampakan, Tupi
2		Luwalhati Antonino	June 30, 1992	June 30, 2001	10th	Lakas	Re-elected in 1995.	1987–2022; General Santos, Polomolok, Tampakan, Tupi
2		Luwalhati Antonino	June 30, 1992	June 30, 2001	11th	LAMMP	Re-elected in 1998.	1987–2022; General Santos, Polomolok, Tampakan, Tupi
3		Darlene Antonino Custodio	June 30, 2001	June 30, 2010	12th	NPC	Elected in 2001.	1987–2022; General Santos, Polomolok, Tampakan, Tupi
3		Darlene Antonino Custodio	June 30, 2001	June 30, 2010	13th	NPC	Re-elected in 2004.	1987–2022; General Santos, Polomolok, Tampakan, Tupi
3		Darlene Antonino Custodio	June 30, 2001	June 30, 2010	14th	NPC	Re-elected in 2007.	1987–2022; General Santos, Polomolok, Tampakan, Tupi
4		Pedro B. Acharon Jr.	June 30, 2010	June 30, 2019	15th	NPC	Elected in 2010.	1987–2022; General Santos, Polomolok, Tampakan, Tupi
4		Pedro B. Acharon Jr.	June 30, 2010	June 30, 2019	16th	Liberal (AIM)	Re-elected in 2013.	1987–2022; General Santos, Polomolok, Tampakan, Tupi
4		Pedro B. Acharon Jr.	June 30, 2010	June 30, 2019	17th	NPC	Re-elected in 2016.	1987–2022; General Santos, Polomolok, Tampakan, Tupi
Vacant			June 30, 2019	November 4, 2019	18th		Election postponed to late 2019.	1987–2022; General Santos, Polomolok, Tampakan, Tupi
5		Shirlyn Bañas Nograles	November 4, 2019	June 30, 2022	18th	PDP–Laban	Election postponement declared as unconstitutional. Elected in 2019.	1987–2022; General Santos, Polomolok, Tampakan, Tupi
6		Isidro D. Lumayag	June 30, 2022	Incumbent	19th	PFP	Elected in 2022.	2022–present Polomolok, Tampakan, Tupi
6		Isidro D. Lumayag	June 30, 2022	Incumbent	20th	PFP	Re-elected in 2025.	2022–present Polomolok, Tampakan, Tupi

== Election results ==
=== 2022 ===
2022 Philippine House of Representatives election in South Cotabato's 1st congressional district
Party	Candidate	Votes	%
PFP	Isidro Lumayag	80,501	58.95
PDP–Laban	Danny Nograles	56,053	41.05
Total votes		136,554	100.00

=== 2019 ===
Candidate	Party	Votes	%
Shirlyn Bañas-Nograles	PDP–Laban	194,929	68.55
Clemencia Dinopol-Cataluña	Independent	44,802	15.76
Arturo Cloma	Nationalist People's Coalition	42,005	14.77
Abelardo Plaza	Independent	2,615	0.92
Total		284,351	100.00

=== 2013 ===
2013 Philippine House of Representatives election at South Cotabato's 1st district
Party	Candidate	Votes	%
NPC	Pedro Acharon	138,079	51.43
UNA	Rogelio Pacquiao	130,377	48.57
Total votes		268,456	100.00
NPC hold			

=== 2010 ===
2010 Philippine House of Representatives election at South Cotabato's 1st district
Party	Candidate	Votes	%
NPC	Pedro Acharon Jr.	163,590	63.24
Independent	Ramon Melliza	51,306	19.83
Liberal	Rogelio Garcia	14,053	5.43
Independent	Franklin Gacal, Jr.	6,327	2.45
Independent	Aldwin Angangan	985	0.38
Independent	Abelardo Plaza	731	0.28
Valid ballots		236,992	91.61
Invalid or blank votes		21,694	8.39
Total votes		258,686	100.00
NPC hold			

=== 2007 ===
2007 Philippine House of Representatives election at South Cotabato's 1st district
Party	Candidate	Votes	%
NPC	Darlene Antonino-Custodio	139,061	64.49
Liberal	Manny Pacquiao	75,908	35.51
Valid ballots		214,969	100.00
NPC hold			

== See also ==
- Legislative districts of South Cotabato
- South Cotabato's 2nd congressional district
- South Cotabato's 3rd congressional district
- General Santos's lone congressional district
- Legislative districts of Cotabato
- Legislative districts of Sarangani
- Legislative districts of Sultan Kudarat
