= Shirlyn Bañas-Nograles =

Filipino politician

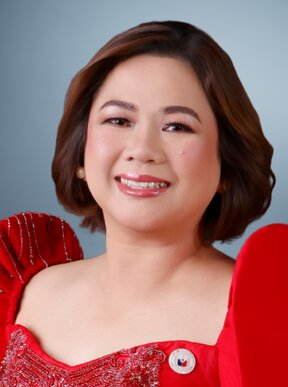
- Official portrait, 2025

Member of the House of Representatives of the Philippines from the General Santos's at-large district
- Incumbent
- Assumed office June 30, 2025
- Preceded by: Loreto Acharon

Member of the House of Representatives of the Philippines from South Cotabato's 1st district
- In office November 4, 2019 – June 30, 2022
- Preceded by: Pedro Acharon Jr.
- Succeeded by: Isidro D. Lumayag (as representative for the reapportioned 1st District of South Cotabato)

Vice Mayor of General Santos
- In office June 30, 2010 – June 30, 2019
- Mayor: Darlene Antonino-Custodio (2010–2013); Ronnel Rivera (2013–2019)
- Preceded by: Florante Congson
- Succeeded by: Loreto Acharon

Member of the General Santos City Council
- In office June 30, 2004 – June 30, 2007

Personal details
- Born: Shirlyn Legario Bañas; June 28, 1974 (age 52)
- Party: PDP (2018–present); RCRi-AIM Alliance (local party; 2024–present)
- Other political affiliations: PCM (2009–2021); UNA (2012–2018)
- Spouse: Danny Buenafe Nograles
- Children: 1
- Education: University of the Philippines Visayas (BS Biology); Mindanao State University (JD); Ateneo de Davao University (JD); Philippine Public Safety College (MPSA)
- Website: Official website

Shirlyn Legario Bañas-Nograles (born June 28, 1974) is a Filipino politician serving as Representative for the Lone District of General Santos since June 30, 2025. She previously served as the Representative for the First District of South Cotabato and General Santos from 2019 to 2022.

Her entry into the House of Representatives in 2019 was the subject of a major electoral dispute after the Commission on Elections (COMELEC) suspended the 2019 election for her district. Despite the suspension, she won a majority of the votes cast. In the landmark case Bañas-Nograles v. COMELEC (G.R. No. 246328), the Supreme Court ultimately nullified the COMELEC's decision and ordered her proclamation as the duly elected representative.

Before her election to Congress, she served as the Vice Mayor of General Santos from 2010 to 2019 and as a City Councilor from 2004 to 2007.

== Early life and education ==
Shirlyn Legario Bañas was born on June 28, 1974 to Cesar "Dodoy" Blabagno Bañas, Sr. from Barotac Viejo, Iloilo and Melba Legario Bañas of Dumangas, Iloilo. She is a scion of the Bañas political family, a significant name in the political landscape of General Santos City.

Her father was a former General Santos City Councilor. Her uncles were also prominent public servants: Atty. Rufino "Pino" Bañas served as Assemblyman of South Cotabato in the Regular Batasang Pambansa from 1984–1986. Rodolfo "Jun" Bañas was a former City Councilor, while Dr. Irineo Bañas was the longest-tenured Medical Director of the General Santos City Emergency Hospital, now known as the Dr. Jorge P. Royeca City Hospital. Her younger brother, Cesar L. Bañas Jr., is an incumbent City Councilor since July 2025. The Bañas' are related to the Tupas political clan of Barotac Viejo, Iloilo.

She completed her primary and secondary education at Notre Dame of Dadiangas for Girls. She then earned a Bachelor of Science in Biology from the University of the Philippines Visayas in 1996. She later pursued a legal education, obtaining her Juris Doctor degree from Mindanao State University and Ateneo de Davao University in April 2003.

In 2011, she was awarded a Doctor of International Relations (honoris causa) by Zoe Life Theological College. She later earned a Master in Public Safety Administration (MPSA) from the Philippine Public Safety College in November 2022, where her policy paper, "Reclassification of Available Land Resources in General Santos City to Address the Challenge of Urbanization," was also recognized with the Best in Policy Paper award.

== Political career ==
=== City Councilor of General Santos (2004–2007) ===
Bañas-Nograles began her political career in 2004 when she was elected to the Sangguniang Panlungsod of General Santos. She garnered the highest number of votes, earning her the distinction of "No. 1 City Councilor". During her term, she chaired the committees on Fisheries and Aquatic Resources, Tourism and Cultural Affairs, and Livelihood and Business Enterprises. A notable accomplishment from this period was her leadership in recognizing K'laja as a Historical and Cultural Site and Eco-Tourism Site, signaling an early commitment to cultural heritage conservation.

=== Vice Mayor of General Santos (2010–2019) ===
After a brief hiatus, Bañas-Nograles was elected Vice Mayor of General Santos in 2010, a position she held for three consecutive terms until 2019. As Vice Mayor, she served as the presiding officer of the city council. She also served as the Regional Chairperson for the Vice Mayors' League of the Philippines for Region XII from 2010 to 2016.

During her nine-year tenure, she initiated a number of modernization and transparency reforms, for which she received a service award upon the completion of her final term. Her key achievements included:

- The implementation of the SP Legislative Information Tracking System (LITS).
- The establishment of the city council's official website, newsletter, and the livestreaming of council sessions on YouTube.
- The promotion of indigenous culture, including the mandatory representation of Indigenous Peoples in the city council and the establishment of "GSC Blaan Day".
- Key proponent of an ordinance mandating the representation of Indigenous Peoples (IPs) in the City Council
- Leading the city's cultural mapping project and the establishment of a public museum.
- Modernizing the General Santos City Public Library by providing free internet and implementing an open-source integrated library system.
- Compilation of the General Code of Ordinances of General Santos City, a project she completed in just three years with zero budget.
- In 2018, she represented General Santos in the United States to formalize a Sister Cities Agreement with Jersey City, New Jersey, aimed at fostering mutual growth and development.

=== House of Representatives (2019–present) ===
==== 2019 Election and Supreme Court Case ====
In 2019, Bañas-Nograles ran for representative of the 1st district of South Cotabato under the People's Champ Movement (PCM), a local party founded by former Senator Manny Pacquiao. The election was thrown into turmoil by the passage of Republic Act 11243 on March 11, 2019, which created a separate legislative district for General Santos City. The law was set to "commence in the next national and local elections".

Citing logistical constraints due to the law taking effect just weeks before the May 13 election, the Commission on Elections (COMELEC) issued Resolution 10524, suspending the election for the district and declaring that any votes cast for the position would be considered "stray".

Despite the suspension, voting proceeded, and Bañas-Nograles received 194,929 votes, or 68.55% of the total votes cast. However, due to the COMELEC resolution, she was not proclaimed the winner.

Bañas-Nograles and her party challenged the validity of the COMELEC resolution before the Supreme Court. On September 10, 2019, the Supreme Court, in a unanimous 14-0 en banc decision, ruled in her favor. The Court declared COMELEC Resolution 10524 null and void, upheld the validity of the May 13 election, and ordered COMELEC to convene a Special Provincial Board of Canvassers to proclaim Bañas-Nograles as the duly elected representative. The Court reasoned that R.A. 11243 did not grant COMELEC the authority to change the constitutionally mandated election schedule. She formally took her oath of office on November 4, 2019.

==== Tenure ====
During the 18th Congress, she held several key leadership positions, serving as Vice Chairperson for four distinct committees: the Special Committee on East ASEAN Growth Area, the Committee on Peoples' Participation, the Special Committee on Persons with Disabilities, and the Committee on Population and Family Relations. Her memberships were equally strategic, placing her on committees directly relevant to her legislative goals, including Agriculture and Food, Mindanao Affairs, Health, Higher and Technical Education, and the Special Committee on Flagship Programs and Projects.

Her legislative work has focused on regional development, healthcare, and education. Key bills she has authored include proposals to:

- Create the General Paulino Santos International Airport Authority.
- Convert the Dr. Jorge P. Royeca City Hospital into the General Santos City Medical Center, increasing its bed capacity and upgrading its services.
- Establish a College of Medicine and a College of Law at Mindanao State University – General Santos Campus.
- Promote domestic mineral processing by restricting the export of raw metallic ores.
- Filed House Resolution No. 2476 in the House of Representatives urging all government bodies to use the correct name "Blaan" when referring to the Blaan indigenous peoples of South Central Mindanao.

=== 2022 Mayoral Bid ===
In 2022, Bañas-Nograles made a strategic bid for the mayoralty of General Santos City. This was her second attempt at the city's top executive post, having previously run for mayor in 2007, where she lost to the incumbent, Pedro B. Acharon Jr. The 2022 race pitted her against Lorelie Pacquiao, sister-in-law of Manny Pacquiao and the candidate of the local PCM party, and Elmer Catulpos, founder of Brigada Media Group. She ultimately placed second, securing 85,869 votes (32.32%) against Pacquiao's 104,244 votes (39.24%).

=== Return to the House of Representatives (2025–present) ===
Bañas-Nograles was successfully elected as the Representative for the Lone District of General Santos in the 2025 Philippine general election. She is currently serving her second term in the 20th Congress for the 2025–2028 term. She won by an overwhelming 163,511 votes against then-incumbent Loreto Acharon who garnered 92,771 votes.

== Legislative Portfolio ==
Bañas-Nograles's legislative work has focused on economic development, healthcare, education, and local governance. Key bills she has authored or re-filed include:

Category	House Bill Number(s)	Description
Economic Development	HB 6863	Creation of the General Paulino Santos International Airport Authority.
Health & Education	HB 7473 / HB 272	Establishment of a College of Medicine at Mindanao State University-General Santos.
	HB 8819	Conversion of the Dr. Jorge P. Royeca City Hospital into the General Santos City Medical Center.
	HB 8921	Granting a broadcast franchise to DepEd Region XII for educational programming.
Governance	HB 5774	Creation of the Lone Legislative District of General Santos City.
	HB 9028 / HB 794	Amending the Local Government Code to ensure a just share of the National Tax Allotment for all barangays.

== Advocacies and Controversies ==
=== Upper Silway Bridge Investigation ===
In November 2020, Bañas-Nograles called on President Rodrigo Duterte and then-DPWH Secretary Mark Villar to investigate a PHP200 million bridge project in General Santos. She questioned why the Upper Silway Bridge required an additional PHP88 million for rehabilitation just two years after its completion, suggesting poor quality work by the contractor and a waste of public funds. She argued the project should have been covered by a 15-year warranty against structural defects.

=== Cyber Libel Complaint ===
In 2022, Bañas-Nograles filed a P100-million cyber libel complaint against radio commentators Abner Francisco and Carlo Dugaduga, along with their media company, Brigada News FM, alleging they had accused her and her husband of demanding bribes from government contractors. The city prosecutor's office dismissed the complaint, stating that she failed to establish all the required elements of libel. Her subsequent motion for reconsideration was also dismissed on the technicality that it was not notarized.

== Personal life ==
She is married to Danny Buenafe Nograles, a businessman and current barangay captain of Pagalungan, Polomolok. They have one daughter, Melevee Jade Bañas Nograles. While she carries the Nograles surname by marriage, there is no known relation to the prominent Nograles political dynasty of Davao based on available public records.
