= Achievers with Integrity Movement =

Regional political party

The Achievement with Integrity Movement (AIM) is a South Cotabato regional political party in the Philippines, closely affiliated with the Nationalist People's Coalition and the Genuine Opposition.

== History ==
The party was founded by former General Santos mayor and South Cotabato Representative Adelbert Antonino. The party-list had multiple candidates in the election for General Santos councilor in the 2016 Philippine local elections. Only one candidate gained a seat with 91,692 votes. In the 2025 Philippine local elections, the party list had a few candidates for the councilor seats of General Santos. None of them won.

== 2007 elections ==
In the 2007 Philippine general election, the party list gained the mayoral and vice mayoral seats in General Santos, winning 20 out of the 26 barangays in the city. During the elections, the party-list was aligned with Then-Senator Benigno Aquino III. Representative Lu Antonio opposed Manny Pacquiao in the congressional fight for South Cotabato. The party list won one seat in the House of Representatives for South Cotabato's 1st congressional district.

== 2019 elections ==
Multiple of their candidates filed their candidacy for local positions of General Santos on October 19, 2018, for the 2019 Philippine local elections. Two of their candidates won the elections for councilor in the last two seats. They also won the vice mayoral position with Ton Acharon, which gained 96,449 votes. They lost the mayoral election with Jay Omila, who gained 82,962 votes.

== 2022 elections ==
The party list had one mayoral candidate, one vice mayoral candidate, and multiple councilor candidates for General Santos in the 2022 Philippine local elections. The mayoral candidate, Brigada Catulpos, gained 3rd place with 72,626 votes, 27.34 percent of the votes. The vice mayoral candidate gained 2nd place with 78,573 votes, 32.18 percent of the votes. Only two councilor candidates won, with the highest gaining 84,162 votes, 30.39 percent of the votes.
