= Mayor of General Santos =

Local chief executive of General Santos, Philippines

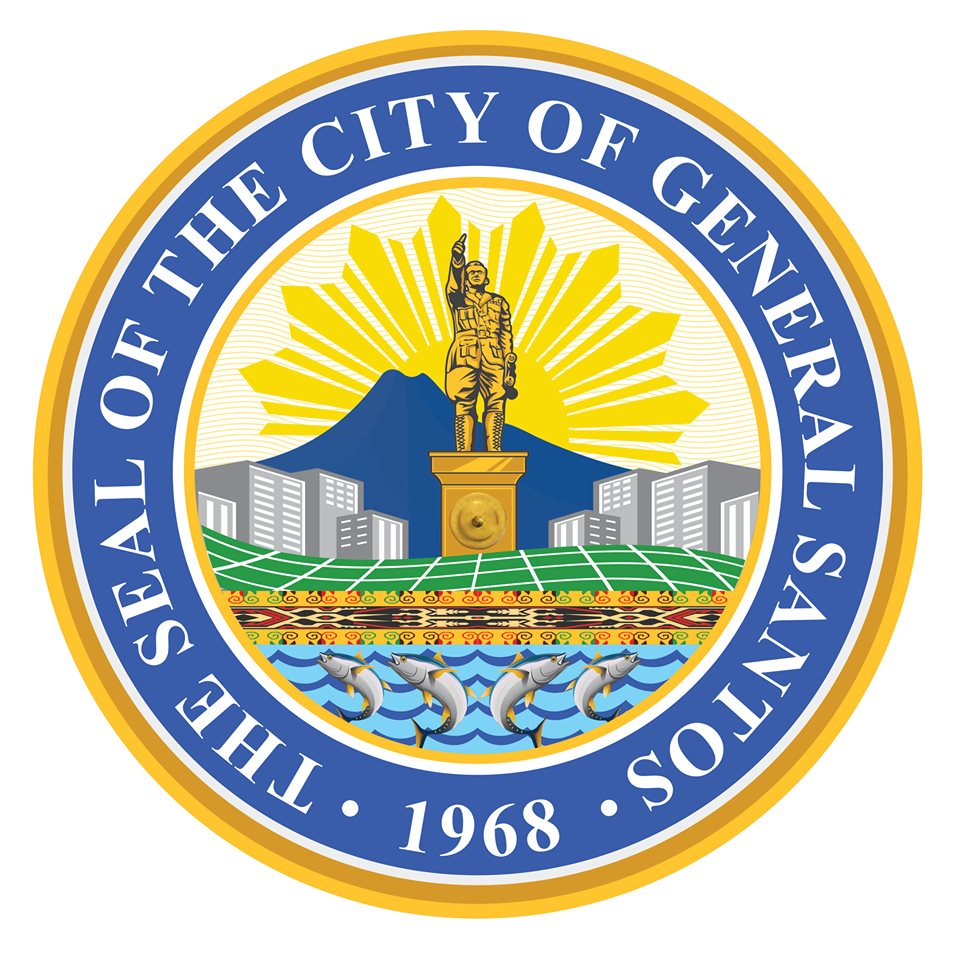
- Incumbent; Lorelie G. Pacquiao since June 30, 2022
- Appointer: Elected via popular vote
- Term length: 3 years, not eligible for re-election immediately after three consecutive terms
- Inaugural holder: Datu Sharif Zainal Abedin
- Formation: 1939
- Succession: Vice Mayor then highest ranking Sangguniang Panlungsod member
- Deputy: Vice Mayor

The mayor of General Santos (Filipino: Punong Lungsod ng Heneral Santos) is the head of the local government of General Santos in South Cotabato, Philippines. The mayor's term is three years. The Mayor is the executive head and leads the city's departments in executing city ordinances and operating public services.

== Functions and duties ==
The Local Government Code of 1991 outlines the functions and duties of the city mayor as follows:

- Exercise general supervision and control over all programs, projects, services, and activities of the city government;
- Enforce all laws and ordinances relative to the governance of the city and in the exercise of the appropriate corporate powers provided for under Section 22 of the Code, implement all approved policies, programs, projects, services and activities of the city;
- Initiate and maximize the generation of resources and revenues, and apply the same to the implementation of development plans, program objectives and priorities as provided for under Section 18 of the Code, particularly those resources and revenues programmed for agro-industrial development and countryside growth and progress;
- Ensure the delivery of basic services and the provision of adequate facilities as provided for under Section 17 of the Code;
- Exercise such other powers and perform such other duties and functions as may be prescribed by law or ordinance.

== List ==
| No. | Name | Image | Term Began | Term Ended | Notes | Ref. |
|---|---|---|---|---|---|---|
| * | | Datu Sharif Zainal Abedin | 1939 | 1943 | Appointed as Municipal District Mayor of Buayan Municipal District, the former name of General Santos. | |
| 1 | | Ireneo L. Santiago | 1943 | 1955 | Appointed as Mayor of Rajah Buayan District, another former name of General Santos. | |
| 2 | | Pedro A. Acharon, Sr. | January 1956 | December 1959 | Previously served as vice mayor of the 1st Municipal Council of the former Buayan from 1948 to 1951. | |
| 3 | | Jorge P. Royeca | January 1960 | December 1963 | | |
| 4 | | Lucio C. Velayo | January 1964 | December 1967 | | |
| 5 | | Antonio C. Acharon | January 3, 1968 | September 4, 1968 | Last elected Municipal Mayor prior to cityhood. | |
Mayor of the City of General Santos
| (5) | | Antonio C. Acharon | September 5, 1968 | March 14, 1986 | First City Mayor following cityhood. | |
| 6 | | Dominador A. Lagare | March 21, 1986 | March 30, 1987 | Appointed in an officer in charge (OIC) capacity following the EDSA People Power Revolution. | |
| 7 | | Rosalita Nuñez (Rosalita Tolibas Nuñez) | May 22, 1987 | December 3, 1987 | Served in an officer in charge (OIC) capacity, having previously served as OIC vice mayor of the 6th City Council from April 1986 to March 1987. | |
| 8 | | J.F. Antonio S. Munda | December 1987 | April 1988 | Served in an officer in charge (OIC) capacity. | |
| 9 | | Marcelo Argullana | 1988 | | Served in an officer in charge (OIC) capacity | |
| (7) | | Rosalita Nuñez (Rosalita Tolibas Nuñez) | c. 1988 | June 30, 1992 | Elected as City Mayor. | |
| 10 | | Adelbert W. Antonino (Adelbert Welborn Antonino) | July 1, 1992 | June 30, 1995 | Previously served as representative of South Cotabato's 1st congressional district from 1987 to 1992. | |
| (7) | | Rosalita Nuñez (Rosalita Tolibas Nuñez) | July 1, 1995 | June 30, 1998 | | |
| (10) | | Adelbert W. Antonino (Adelbert Welborn Antonino) | July 1, 1998 | June 30, 2001 | | |
| 11 | | Pedro B. Acharon, Jr. (Pedro Busgano Acharon Jr.) | July 1, 2001 | June 30, 2010 | Previously served as vice mayor of the 12th City Council from July 1, 1998 to June 30, 2001. | |
| 12 | | Darlene Antonino Custodio (Darlene Magnolia Ricasa Antonino-Custodio) | July 1, 2010 | June 30, 2013 | Previously served as representative of South Cotabato's 1st congressional district from 2001 to 2010. | |
| 13 | | Ronnel C. Rivera (Ronnel Chua Rivera) | July 1, 2013 | June 30, 2022 | Previously served as city councilor from July 1, 2010 to June 30, 2013. | |
| 14 | | Lorelie G. Pacquiao (Lorelie Ocmar Geronimo Pacquiao) | July 1, 2022 | Incumbent (Term expires 30 June 2025) | | |

== Post-mayoral life ==
After leaving office, a number of mayors held various public positions and made an effort to remain in the limelight.

- Rosalita Nuñez currently serves as the City Vice Mayor of General Santos City since 2022 (term expires in 2024).
- Pedro B. Acharon, Jr. served as representative of South Cotabato's 1st congressional district from 2010 to 2019.
