= 2025 Philippine House of Representatives elections in Soccsksargen =

- May 12, 2025
- All 10 Soccsksargen seats in the House of Representatives
Party	Seats	+/–
Lakas	3	+1
PFP	3	+1
PDP–Laban	1	0
Nacionalista	1	0
Aksyon	1	+1
PMP	1	New
This lists parties that won seats. See the complete results below.

The 2025 Philippine House of Representatives elections in Soccsksargen were held on May 12, 2025, as part of the 2025 Philippine general election.

== Summary ==
Congressional district	Incumbent	Incumbent's party	Winner	Winner's party	Winning margin
Cotabato–1st	Joel Sacdalan	NPC	Edwin Cruzado	PMP	1.84%
Cotabato–2nd	Rudy Caoagdan	Nacionalista	Rudy Caoagdan	Nacionalista	89.48%
Cotabato–3rd	Samantha Santos	Lakas	Samantha Santos	Lakas	Unopposed
General Santos	Loreto Acharon	NPC	Shirlyn Bañas-Nograles	PDP–Laban	27.14%
Sarangani	Steve Solon	Lakas	Steve Solon	Lakas	62.64%
South Cotabato–1st	Ed Lumayag	PFP	Ed Lumayag	PFP	12.71%
South Cotabato–2nd	Peter Miguel	Lakas	Ferdinand Hernandez	PFP	16.16%
South Cotabato–3rd	New district		Dibu Tuan	Aksyon	4.66%
Sultan Kudarat–1st	Rihan Sakaluran	Lakas	Ruth Sakaluran	Lakas	Unopposed
Sultan Kudarat–2nd	Horacio Suansing Jr.	NUP	Bella Suansing	PFP	Unopposed

== Cotabato ==
=== 1st district ===
Incumbent Joel Sacdalan of the Nationalist People's Coalition ran for a third term. He was previously affiliated with PDP–Laban.

Sacdalan was defeated by provincial board member Edwin Cruzado of Pwersa ng Masang Pilipino.

Candidate	Party	Votes	%
Edwin Cruzado	Pwersa ng Masang Pilipino	98,210	50.92
Joel Sacdalan (incumbent)	Nationalist People's Coalition	94,679	49.08
Total		192,889	100.00
Valid votes		192,889	93.43
Invalid/blank votes		13,574	6.57
Total votes		206,463	100.00
Registered voters/turnout		246,037	83.92
PMP gain from NPC			
Source: Commission on Elections

=== 2nd district ===
Incumbent Rudy Caoagdan of the Nacionalista Party ran for a third term.

Caoagdan won re-election against former representative Greg Andolana (Independent).

Candidate	Party	Votes	%
Rudy Caoagdan (incumbent)	Nacionalista Party	195,870	94.74
Greg Andolana	Independent	10,874	5.26
Total		206,744	100.00
Valid votes		206,744	88.05
Invalid/blank votes		28,053	11.95
Total votes		234,797	100.00
Registered voters/turnout		276,804	84.82
Nacionalista hold			
Source: Commission on Elections

=== 3rd district ===
Incumbent Samantha Santos of Lakas–CMD won re-election for a second term unopposed.

Candidate	Party	Votes	%
Samantha Santos (incumbent)	Lakas–CMD	169,867	100.00
Total		169,867	100.00
Valid votes		169,867	72.72
Invalid/blank votes		63,714	27.28
Total votes		233,581	100.00
Registered voters/turnout		274,768	85.01
Lakas hold			
Source: Commission on Elections

== General Santos ==
Incumbent Loreto Acharon of the Nationalist People's Coalition ran for a second term.

Acharon was defeated by former South Cotabato's 1st district representative Shirlyn Bañas-Nograles of the PDP–Laban. Sterling Sañado (Independent) also ran for representative.

Candidate	Party	Votes	%
Shirlyn Bañas-Nograles	PDP–Laban	163,511	62.74
Loreto Acharon (incumbent)	Nationalist People's Coalition	92,771	35.60
Sterling Sañado	Independent	4,337	1.66
Total		260,619	100.00
Valid votes		260,619	92.09
Invalid/blank votes		22,377	7.91
Total votes		282,996	100.00
Registered voters/turnout		368,454	76.81
PDP–Laban gain from NPC			
Source: Commission on Elections

== Sarangani ==
Incumbent Steve Solon of Lakas–CMD ran for a second term. He was previously affiliated with the People's Champ Movement.

Solon won re-election against two other candidates.

Candidate	Party	Votes	%
Steve Solon (incumbent)	Lakas–CMD	187,041	80.42
Kingchopazar Belimac	PDP–Laban	41,363	17.78
Butch Baliao	Independent	4,185	1.80
Total		232,589	100.00
Valid votes		232,589	81.71
Invalid/blank votes		52,064	18.29
Total votes		284,653	100.00
Registered voters/turnout		373,178	76.28
Lakas hold			
Source: Commission on Elections

== South Cotabato ==
=== 1st district ===
Incumbent Ed Lumayag of the Partido Federal ng Pilipinas ran for a second term.

Lumayag won re-election against Gerry Barrientos (Aksyon Demokratiko), Polomolok councilor Leo Cordova (PDP–Laban) and Emer Ampo (Independent).

Candidate	Party	Votes	%
Ed Lumayag (incumbent)	Partido Federal ng Pilipinas	69,965	47.93
Gerry Barrientos	Aksyon Demokratiko	51,409	35.22
Leo Cordova	PDP–Laban	23,644	16.20
Emer Ampo	Independent	964	0.66
Total		145,982	100.00
Valid votes		145,982	90.80
Invalid/blank votes		14,791	9.20
Total votes		160,773	100.00
Registered voters/turnout		195,438	82.26
PFP hold			
Source: Commission on Elections

=== 2nd district ===
As a result of South Cotabato being redistricted in 2022, the district was reduced to the city of Koronadal and the municipalities of Banga and Tantangan.

Incumbent Peter Miguel of Lakas–CMD ran for a second term. He was previously affiliated with the Partido Federal ng Pilipinas (PFP).

Miguel was defeated by former representative Ferdinand Hernandez of the PFP.

Candidate	Party	Votes	%
Ferdinand Hernandez	Partido Federal ng Pilipinas	103,984	58.08
Peter Miguel (incumbent)	Lakas–CMD	75,046	41.92
Total		179,030	100.00
Valid votes		179,030	97.77
Invalid/blank votes		4,083	2.23
Total votes		183,113	100.00
Registered voters/turnout		211,517	86.57
PFP gain from Lakas			
Source: Commission on Elections

=== 3rd district ===
As a result of South Cotabato being redistricted in 2022, the district was recreated with the municipalities of Lake Sebu, Norala, Santo Niño, Surallah and T'Boli, which used to be under South Cotabato's 2nd district.

Former T'Boli mayor Dibu Tuan (Aksyon Demokratiko) won the election against Surallah vice mayor Antonio Bendita (Partido Federal ng Pilipinas), provincial board member Mike Matinong (Independent) and Ahloy Mesias (Independent).

Candidate	Party	Votes	%
Dibu Tuan	Aksyon Demokratiko	81,365	46.80
Antonio Bendita	Partido Federal ng Pilipinas	73,262	42.14
Mike Matinong	Independent	17,131	9.85
Ahloy Mesias	Independent	2,112	1.21
Total		173,870	100.00
Valid votes		173,870	93.83
Invalid/blank votes		11,432	6.17
Total votes		185,302	100.00
Registered voters/turnout		222,412	83.31
Aksyon gain			
Source: Commission on Elections

== Sultan Kudarat ==
=== 1st district ===
Incumbent Bai Rihan Sakaluran of Lakas–CMD retired to run for mayor of Isulan.

Lakas–CMD nominated Sakaluran's mother, former Lutayan mayor Ruth Sakaluran, who won the election unopposed.

Candidate	Party	Votes	%
Ruth Sakaluran	Lakas–CMD	158,034	100.00
Total		158,034	100.00
Valid votes		158,034	67.23
Invalid/blank votes		77,021	32.77
Total votes		235,055	100.00
Registered voters/turnout		275,693	85.26
Lakas hold			
Source: Commission on Elections

=== 2nd district ===
Incumbent Horacio Suansing Jr. of the National Unity Party was term-limited.

Suansing endorsed his daughter, Bella Suansing (Partido Federal ng Pilipinas), who won the election unopposed.

Candidate	Party	Votes	%
Bella Suansing	Partido Federal ng Pilipinas	138,151	100.00
Total		138,151	100.00
Valid votes		138,151	71.15
Invalid/blank votes		56,006	28.85
Total votes		194,157	100.00
Registered voters/turnout		257,691	75.34
PFP gain from NUP			
Source: Commission on Elections
