= Allah River =

River in Mindanao, Philippines

- Allah River mouth Allah River (Philippines)

Location
- Country: Philippines
- Region: Soccsksargen
- Province: South Cotabato; Sultan Kudarat

Physical characteristics
- Source: Lake Holon
  - location: T'Boli, South Cotabato
- 2nd source: Lake Sebu
  - location: Lake Sebu, South Cotabato
- Mouth: Mindanao River
  - coordinates: 6°54′25″N 124°32′30″E

Basin features
- Tributaries
  - right: Kapingkong River; Ga-o River

The Ala River flows through the Allah Valley on the island of Mindanao in the Philippines. It is located in the provinces of South Cotabato, Sultan Kudarat and Maguindanao del Sur. The name of the river could have come from the word of Allah itself, which is the meaning of God in Arabic.

Its sources are Surallah, Lake Holon, and Lake Sebu. Its tributaries include the Kapingkong River and the Ga-o River. It empties into the Mindanao River.

It is partially controlled by the Allah River Irrigation Project, which includes several dams.
