= South Cotabato's 3rd congressional district =

Congressional district in the Philippines

- Constituency for the House of Representatives of the Philippines
- Province: South Cotabato
- Region: Soccsksargen
- Population: 370,485 (2024)
- Electorate: 222,412 (2025)
- Major settlements: 5 LGUs: Lake Sebu; Norala; Santo Niño; Surallah; T'boli
- Area: 2,347.33 km^{2} (906.31 sq mi)

Current constituency
- Created: 1987
- Representative: Dibu Tuan
- Political party: Lakas–CMD

South Cotabato's 3rd congressional district is a congressional district in South Cotabato that encompasses the western municipalities of Lake Sebu, Norala, Santo Niño, Surallah, and T'boli. It previously encompassed the Sarangani Bay region, a former territory of South Cotabato, from 1987 to 1995. It has been represented in the House of Representatives since 2025 and previously from 1987 to 1995. It is currently represented in the 20th Congress by Dibu Tuan of the Lakas–CMD.

== History ==
The district was initially created in 1987 under the ordinance annex of the 1987 Constitution of the Philippines that divided South Cotabato into three congressional districts. The district was dissolved in 1995 following the ratification of the law that created the province of Sarangani in March 1992, wherein both provinces would elect their respective provincial at-large representatives beginning in May 1995.

It was later recreated on March 11, 2019, from South Cotabato's 1st district, with General Santos being the sole component under Republic Act No. 11243. The title of the act mentions creating "the Lone Legislative District of General Santos City," but its Section 1, paragraph (C) shows that General Santos was South Cotabato's 3rd district. As it was too late in the preparation for the May 2019 elections, elections were postponed to October 2019. As the ballots, which showed the old configuration with General Santos as part of the first district, also had ballot questions for other positions, voting went through, and voters freely voted on the 1st district race. Days before the rescheduled election, the Supreme Court declared the postponement as unconstitutional, and declared the candidate with the most votes in May 2019 as the winner, with the 3rd district as General Santos scheduled to be first contested in 2022.

However, the South Cotabato's districts were redistricted in 2022 through a law that reapportioned South Cotabato's districts into three and made General Santos officially a single, distinct legislative district.

== Representation history ==
#	Image	Member	Term of office		Congress	Party	Electoral history	Constituent LGUs
#	Image	Member	Start	End	Congress	Party	Electoral history	Constituent LGUs
=== South Cotabato's 3rd district for the House of Representatives of the Philippines ===
District created February 2, 1987, from South Cotabato's at-large district.
1		James Chiongbian	June 30, 1987	June 30, 1995	8th	Lakas ng Bansa	Elected in 1987.	1987–1995; Alabel, Glan, Kiamba, Maasim, Maitum, Malapatan, Malungon
1		James Chiongbian	June 30, 1987	June 30, 1995	9th	LDP	Re-elected in 1992. Redistricted to Sarangani's at-large district.	1987–1995; Alabel, Glan, Kiamba, Maasim, Maitum, Malapatan, Malungon
1		James Chiongbian	June 30, 1987	June 30, 1995	9th	Lakas	Re-elected in 1992. Redistricted to Sarangani's at-large district.	1987–1995; Alabel, Glan, Kiamba, Maasim, Maitum, Malapatan, Malungon
District dissolved into Sarangani's at-large district.
District recreated on March 11, 2019 from South Cotabato's 1st district.
Redistricted on June 2, 2022, from South Cotabato's 2nd district.
2		Dibu Tuan	June 30, 2025	Incumbent	20th	Aksyon	Elected in 2025.	2025–present Lake Sebu, Norala, Santo Niño, Surallah, T'boli
2		Dibu Tuan	June 30, 2025	Incumbent	20th	Lakas	Elected in 2025.	2025–present Lake Sebu, Norala, Santo Niño, Surallah, T'boli

== See also ==
- Legislative districts of South Cotabato
- South Cotabato's 1st congressional district
- South Cotabato's 2nd congressional district
- General Santos's lone congressional district
- Legislative districts of Cotabato
- Legislative districts of Sarangani
- Legislative districts of Sultan Kudarat
