= Allah Valley =

Valley of the Allah River in southern Mindanao, Philippines

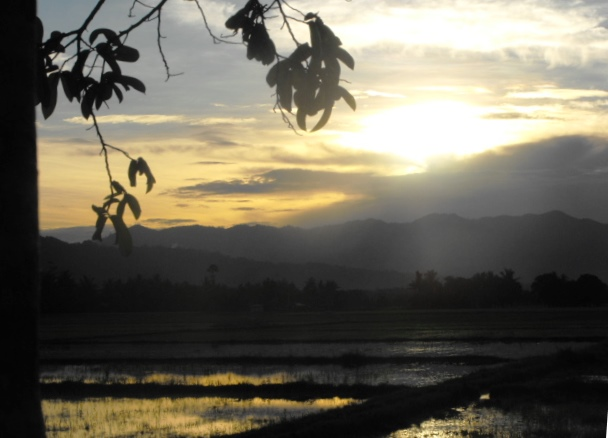
- Allah Valley at Surallah, South Cotabato

- Location within Philippines
- Area: 2,520 km^{2} (970 mi^{2})

Geography
- Location: Mindanao
- Country: Philippines
- State: South Cotabato; Sultan Kudarat
- Region: Soccsksargen
- Population centers: List: Banga; Lake Sebu; Norala; Santo Niño; Surallah; T′Boli
- Borders on: Roxas-Matulas Range (north); Daguma Mountain Range (south)
- Coordinates: 6°25′N 124°42′E
- Rivers: Allah River; Banga River
- Interactive map of Allah Valley

The Allah Valley (at times also spelled Alah) is a large valley of the Allah River in the provinces of South Cotabato and Sultan Kudarat on the island of Mindanao, Philippines. It is formed by the Roxas-Matulas Range in the north and the Daguma Mountain Range in the south.

It is accessible via the Allah Valley Airport in Surallah, South Cotabato.

The valley is known for its natural environment, such as Lake Sebu, Lake Holon, Baras Bird Sanctuary, and Esperanza Hot and Cold Springs. On the other hand, it is adversely affected by flooding, siltation, riverbank migration, unstable agriculture production, and upland degradation, as well as illegal logging.

The entire valley was declared a watershed forest reserve in 1985 through the signing of Proclamation No. 2455. The 102,350-hectare (252,900-acre) protected area also includes Lake Sebu, the Tasaday-Manobo Special Forest Reserve, the Datu Ma Falen Civil Reservation, and the National Cultural Minorities Settlement Reservation located within the valley.

The bestselling Lonely Planet described Lake Sebu as a place located in a “bowl of forests and mountains.” The 42,450-hectare landscape consisting the domains of the Allah Valley is recognized by United Nations Educational, Scientific and Cultural Organization (UNESCO) as a cultural landscape in Mindanao.

== Geography ==
It is a well populated valley with fertile soil, bisected by the Allah and Banga Rivers (tributaries of the Pulangi River). The placid lake of Lake Sebu can be found in the upper part of the Allah Valley. Its elevation ranges from 439 to 1,814 feet (134 to 553 m).

The 2,520 square kilometres (970 sq mi) valley covers over the half of South Cotabato spanning 6 of the 10 municipalities of South Cotabato.

=== Municipalities in the valley ===
- Surallah
- T'boli
- Banga
- Norala
- Santo Niño
- Lake Sebu

== People ==
As of 2007, Allah Valley is home to some 628,832 people, composed of Indigenous T'bolis, B'laan, Tirurays, Manobos and Maguindanaons and settlers from Luzon and Visayas.

== Economy ==
The economy is based on agriculture producing mostly rice, maize, banana, pineapple, oil palm, and asparagus. Another source of income is aquaculture of tilapia in Lake Sebu.

Companies are starting to invest to build factories in the area especially in the municipalities of Surallah and Tboli. Especially eco-tourism is being promoted as a means to boost the region's economy.

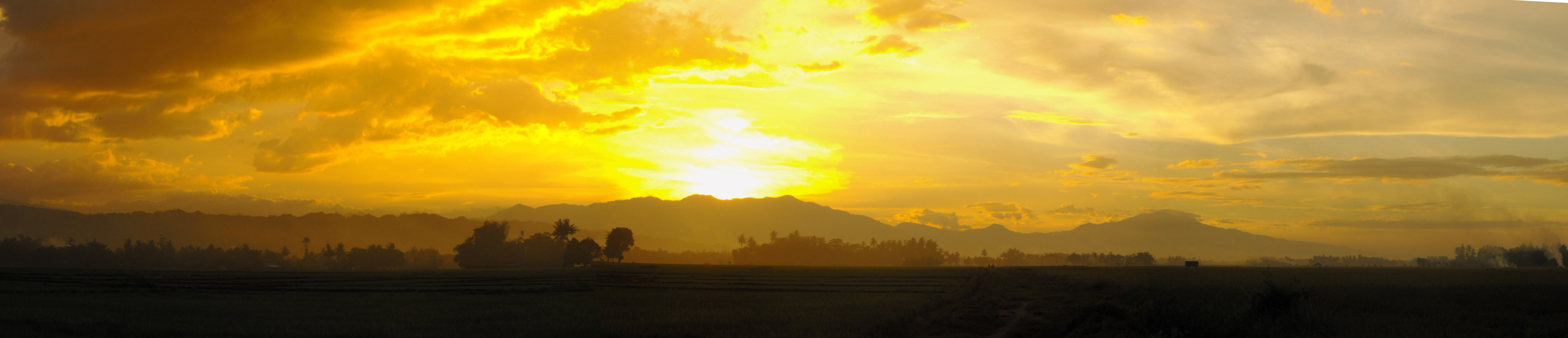
Panorama of the Allah Valley at Surallah
