= Tboli =

Tboli may refer to:

- Tboli people, an ethnic group indigenous to South Cotabato, Philippines
  - Tboli language, their Austronesian language
- Tboli, a municipality in South Cotabato, Philippines
