= Dibu Tuan =

Filipino politician (born 1971)

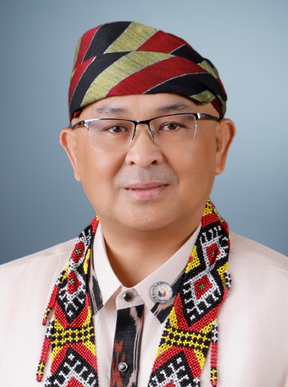
- Official portrait, 2026

Member of Philippine House of Representatives for South Cotabato's 3rd district
- Incumbent
- Assumed office June 30, 2025
- Preceded by: District re-created (seat last held by James Chiongbian in 1995)

Mayor of T'Boli, South Cotabato
- In office June 30, 2013 – June 30, 2022
- Vice Mayor: Grace Silva (2013–2019); Ronie dela Peña (2019–2022)
- Preceded by: Ernesto Manuel
- Succeeded by: Keo Dayle Tuan

Personal details
- Born: Dibu Sno Tuan; October 25, 1971 (age 55) T'Boli, South Cotabato, Philippines
- Party: Lakas (2025–present)
- Other political affiliations: Aksyon (2025); NPC (2016–2022); Liberal (2013–2016)
- Spouse: Bernadette Tuan

Dibu Sno Tuan (born October 25, 1971) is a Filipino politician who has served as the representative for the South Cotabato's 3rd congressional district in the Philippine House of Representatives since 2025. Currently a member of Lakas–CMD, he previously served as mayor of T'Boli, South Cotabato from 2013 to 2022.

== Electoral history ==
Electoral history of Dibu Tuan
Year	Office	Party	Votes received				Result
Year	Office	Party	Total	%	P.	Swing	Result
2013	Mayor of T'Boli, South Cotabato	Independent	—N/a	—N/a	1st	—N/a	Won
2016	Mayor of T'Boli, South Cotabato	Liberal	—N/a	—N/a	1st	—N/a	Unopposed
2019	Mayor of T'Boli, South Cotabato	NPC	26,126	100.00%	1st	—N/a	Unopposed
2025	Representative (South Cotabato–3rd)	Aksyon	81,365	46.80%	1st	—N/a	Won

House of Representatives of the Philippines
New district	Member of Philippine House of Representatives for South Cotabato's 3rd district 2025–present	Incumbent
