= Holy Child College of Information Technology =

Private university in South Cotabato, Philippines

Holy Child Central Colleges Incorporated
- Motto: “Grow With Us Today, Lead the field tomorrow”
- Type: Private
- President: Marivet S. Caballero
- Vice-president: Vanessa Marie L. Antiquin
- Principal: Mr. Lowel D. Pasinag (Basic Education)
- Director: Dr. Erwin M. Faller (Academic)
- Academic Program Heads: Ms. Marivic Baldon (Information Technology), Ms. Nerressa M. Montejo (Business Administration), Mr. Roy Victor F. Sumugat, CPA (Accountancy), Ms. Kimberly P. Surmion (Pharmacy) and Mr. Rey Patrick Jugos (Criminology)
- Location: South Cotabato, Philippines

Holy Child College of Information Technology Inc. (HCCIT) was owned by Marivet S. Caballero. As the school's chief governing body, the Board of Trustees protects the university's integrity, ensures that it fulfills the purposes for which it was established, and preserves and augments its physical and financial assets.

It is the only school in South Cotabato, Philippines with two campuses (Surallah and Marbel).

== Programs/Courses Offered (Updated: S.Y. 2019-2020) ==
Pre-School Department

- Nursery
- Kindergarten

Elementary Department

- Grade 1
- Grade 2
- Grade 3
- Grade 4
- Grade 5
- Grade 6

Junior High School Department

- Grade 7
- Grade 8
- Grade 9
- Grade 10

Senior High School Department
(Academic Track)

- ABM – Accountancy, Business and Management
- GAS – General Academic Strand
- STEM – Science, Technology, Engineering and Mathematics
- HUMSS – Humanities and Social Sciences

(Technical Vocational Livelihood Track)

- Computer System Servicing NC II
- Computer Programming
- Animation
- Cookery
- Housekeeping
- Wellness Massage
- Food and Beverage Services
- Consumer Electronics Servicing

College Department

- BSIT – Bachelor of Science in Information Technology
- BSCS – Bachelor of Science in Computer Science
- ACT – Associate in Computer Technology track to Bachelor of Science in Information Technology (BSIT)
- ACT – Associate in Computer Technology track to Bachelor of Science in Computer Science (BSCS)
- BSBA-MM – Bachelor of Science Business Administration major in Marketing Management
- BSOA – Bachelor of Science in Office Administration
- BSE – Bachelor of Science in Entrepreneurship
- BSA – Bachelor of Science in Accountancy
- BSP – Bachelor of Science in Pharmacy
- BSAIS – Bachelor of Science in Accounting Information System
- BTVTEd – Bachelor of Technical-Vocational Teacher Education
- BECEd – Bachelor of Early Childhood Education
- BSC – Bachelor of Science in Criminology

== Campus ==
- Main: Allah Valley Drive, Surallah, South Cotabato
- Koronadal Campus: Gensan Drive, Koronadal City
