= Lake Sebu =

Lake in South Cotabato, Philippines

- Lanaw Sbù (Tboli); Linaw sang Sëbu (Hiligaynon); Danaw sa Sëbu (Cebuano); Lawa ng Sëbu (Filipino)
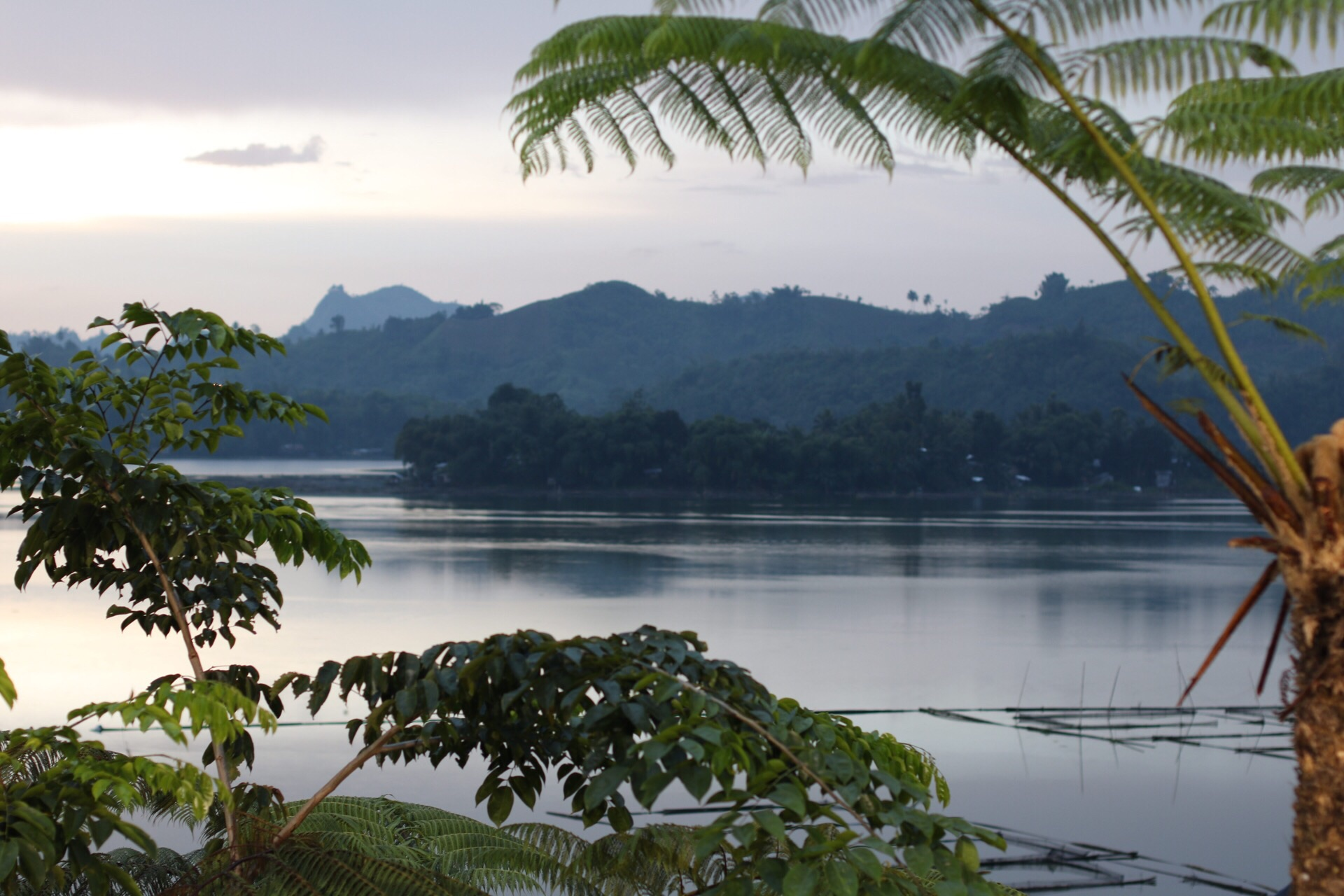
- The lake taken at the Punta Isla Lake Resort

- Location within the Philippines
- Location: South Cotabato, Mindanao
- Coordinates: 6°13′45″N 124°42′21″E
- Basin countries: Philippines
- Surface area: 354 ha (3.54 km^{2})
- Max. depth: 34 m (111.55 ft)
- Surface elevation: 1,000 m (3,280.84 ft)
- Islands: 11 islets/islands

Lake Sebu, is a natural lake located in the municipality of Lake Sebu, South Cotabato within the Alah Valley region. The Philippine government has recognized it as one of the country's most important watersheds. Lake Sebu is one of the many bodies of water supplying important irrigation to the provinces of Sultan Kudarat and South Cotabato.

The villages around the lake have been turned into an independent municipality called Lake Sebu after being a former village of Surallah.

== Ancestral domain ==
The Tboli and Ubo tribes have been the traditional dwellers of the lake. The Department of Environment and Natural Resources has recognized, through Department Administrative Order (DAO) No. 2, Series of 1993, the claim of these tribes that the lake and its surroundings are under their ancestral domain.

== Tourism ==
The Department of Tourism and the local government unit of Lake Sebu has promoted the lake as one of the prime eco-tourism destinations in the municipality. The Mindanao Development Authority is closely coordinating with the DOT in the development and enhancement of Lake Sebu, as it is also identified as one of the priority sites under the BIMP-EAGA Tourism cluster.

== Gallery ==
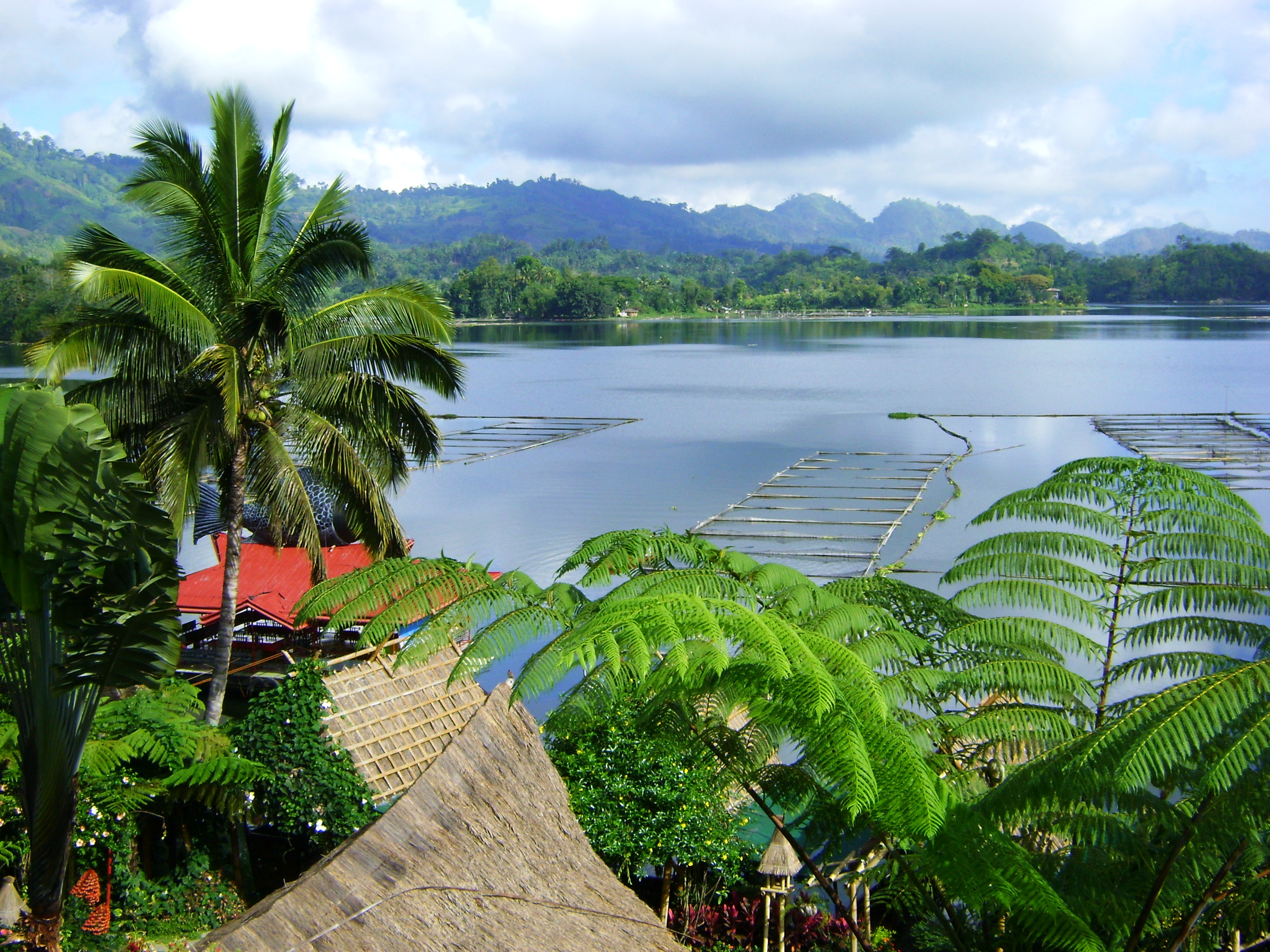
Lake Sebu, as seen from Punta Isla

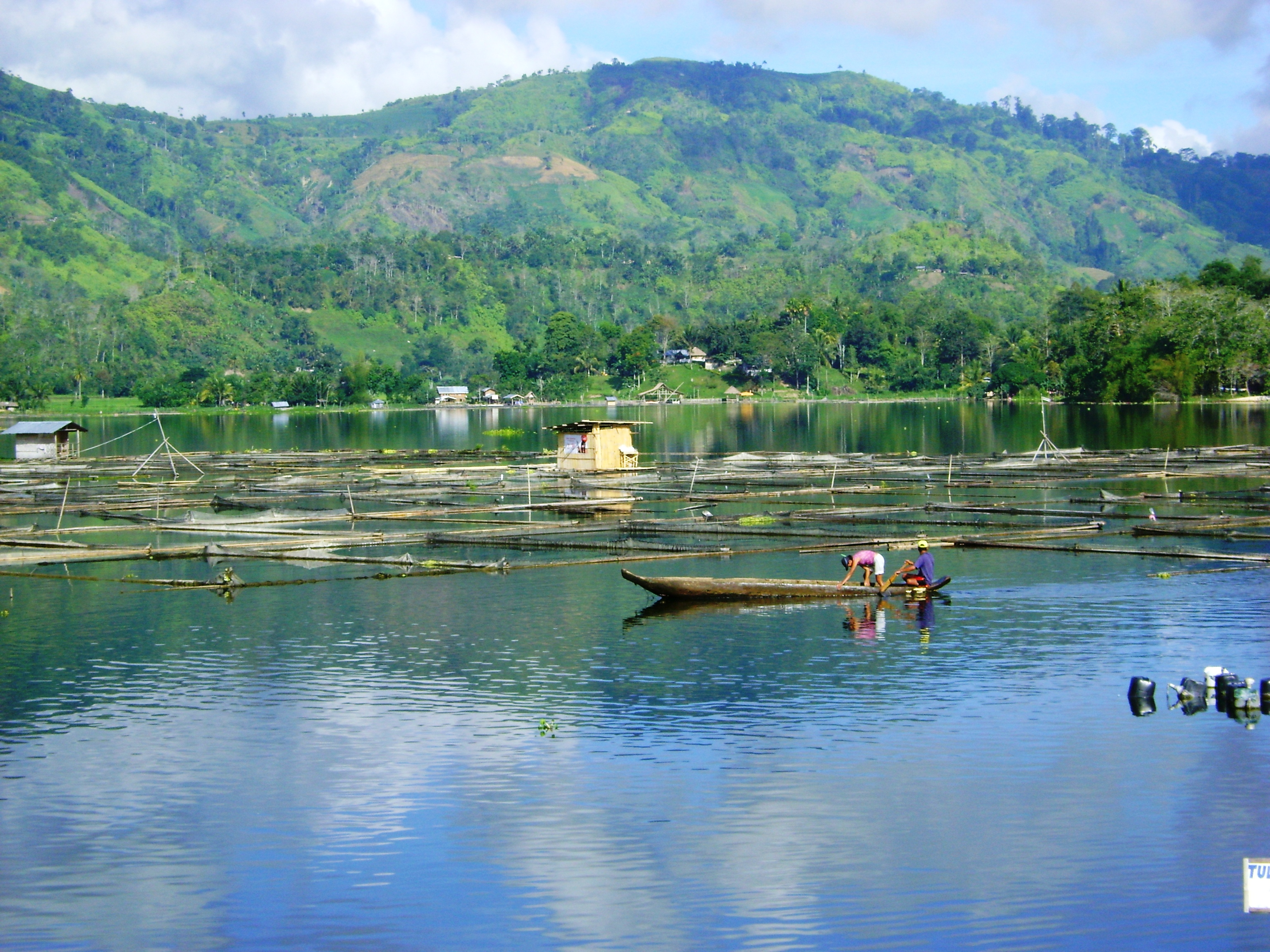
The lake is one of the most important watershed areas in the Philippines

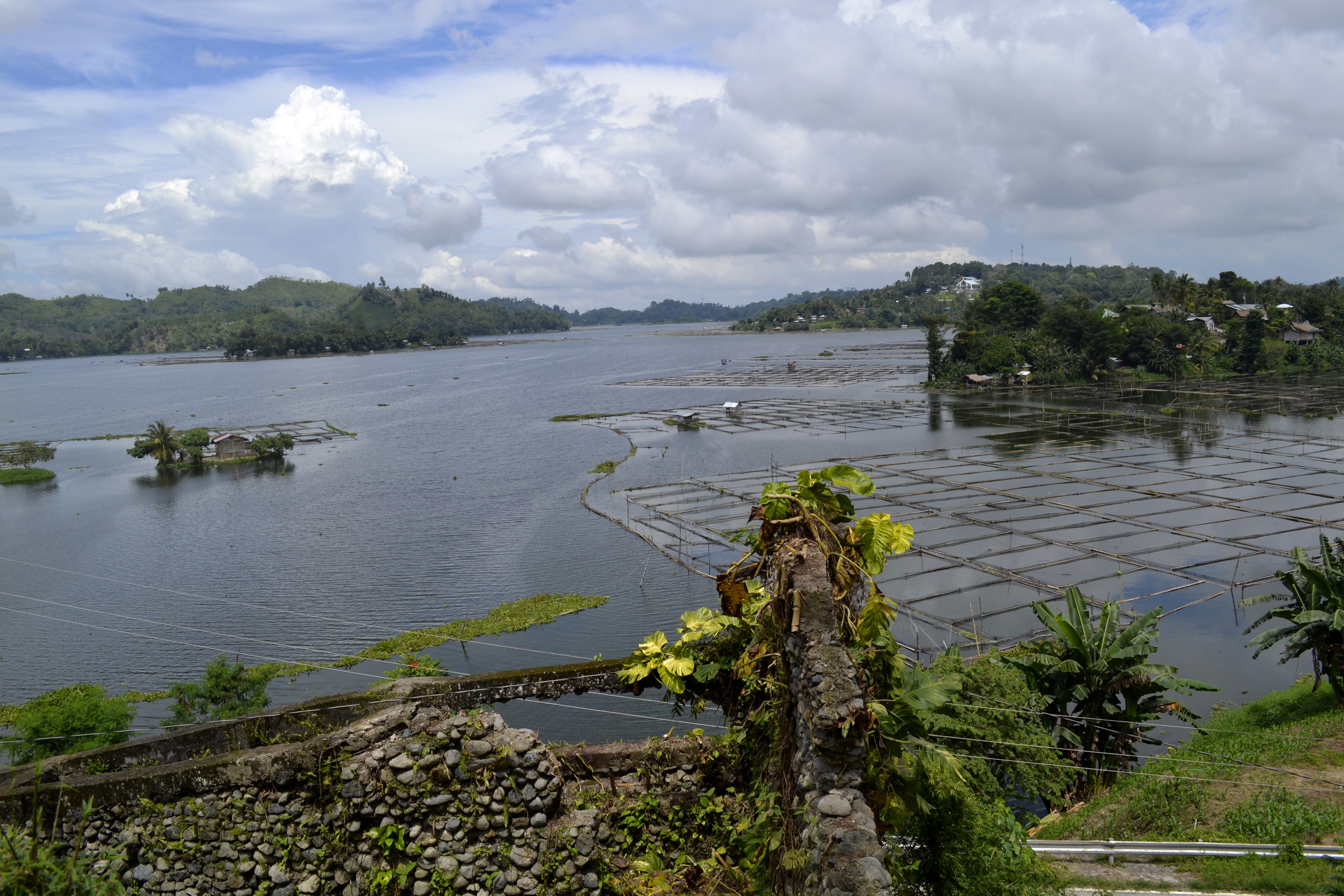
Another view of the lake in South Cotabato.

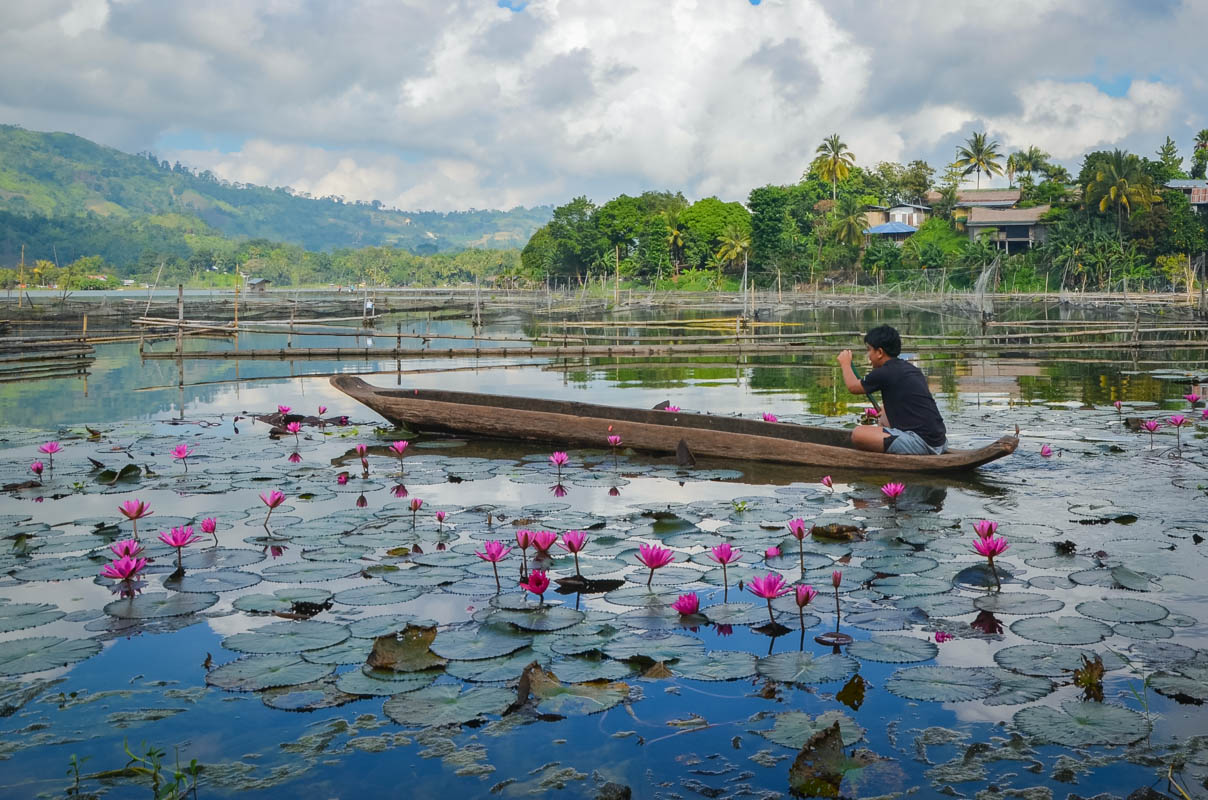
Traditional owong dugout canoes in Lake Sebu

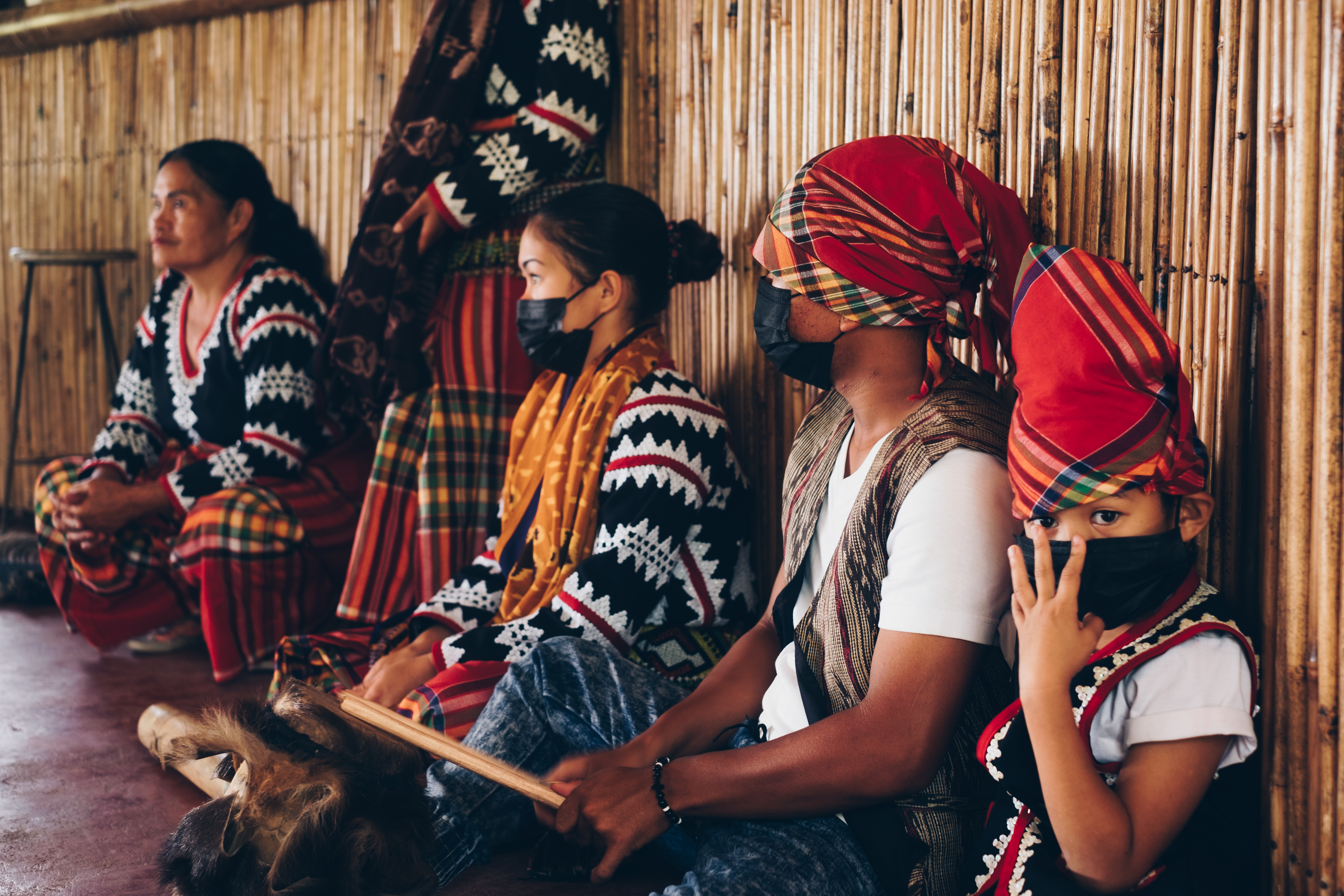
Indigenous people thriving near Lake Sebu
