= 2016 Philippine House of Representatives elections in Soccsksargen =

Elections were held in Soccsksargen for seats in the House of Representatives of the Philippines on May 9, 2016.

== Summary ==
Party	Popular vote	%	Swing	Seats won	Change
KBL					
Liberal					
NPC					
NUP					
PBM					
PCM					
PTM					
Independent					
Valid votes					
Invalid votes					
Turnout					
Registered voters					

== Cotabato ==
Each of Cotabato's three legislative districts will elect each representative to the House of Representatives. The candidate with the highest number of votes wins the seat.

=== 1st District ===
Jesus Sacdalan is the incumbent.

2016 Philippine House of Representatives election at Cotabato's 1st District
Party	Candidate	Votes	%
Liberal	Jesus Sacdalan (incumbent)	115,004	71.54
Independent	Fernando Sacdalan	40,290	25.06
Independent	Abdullatip Sabpel	4,558	2.84
Independent	Alexrazul Alang	908	0.56
Total votes		160,760	100.00
Liberal hold			

=== 2nd District ===
Nancy Catamco is the incumbent.

2016 Philippine House of Representatives election at Cotabato's 2nd District
Party	Candidate	Votes	%
Liberal	Nancy Catamco (incumbent)	94,845	57.85
Independent	Aying Pagal	66,220	40.39
Independent	Virgilio Aspilla	2,872	1.75
Total votes		163,937	100.00
Liberal hold			

=== 3rd District ===
Jose Tejada is the incumbent.

2016 Philippine House of Representatives election at Cotabato's 3rd District
Party	Candidate	Votes	%
Liberal	Jose Tejada (incumbent)	96,558	61.53
Independent	Maybell Valdevieso	54,408	34.67
Independent	Amin Sindao	3,025	1.93
KBL	Samuel Bale	2,304	1.47
Independent	Hyner Descalso	631	0.40
Total votes		156,926	100.00
Liberal hold			

== Sarangani ==
Superstar boxer Manny Pacquiao is the incumbent but not seeking for reelection. He is running for Senate instead.

2016 Philippine House of Representatives election at Sarangani's Lone District
Party	Candidate	Votes	%
PCM	Rogelio Pacquiao	142,307	86.10
Independent	Elson Formoso	13,938	8.43
NPC	Megie Ramos-Orig	6,306	3.82
KBL	Victor Mejia	2,731	1.65
Total votes		165,282	100.00
PCM hold			

== South Cotabato ==
Each of South Cotabato's two legislative districts will elect each representative to the House of Representatives. The candidate with the highest number of votes wins the seat.

=== 1st District ===
Pedro Acharon Jr. is the incumbent.

2016 Philippine House of Representatives election at South Cotabato's 1st District
Party	Candidate	Votes	%
NPC	Pedro Acharon Jr. (incumbent)	173,255	60.07
KBL	Ryan Rivera	115,149	39.93
Total votes		288,404	100.00
NPC hold			

=== 2nd District ===
Ferdinand Hernandez is the incumbent.

2016 Philippine House of Representatives election at South Cotabato's 2nd District
Party	Candidate	Votes	%
NPC	Ferdinand Hernandez (incumbent)	142,817	62.45
Independent	Arthur Pingoy Jr.	85,883	37.55
Total votes		228,700	100.00
NPC hold			

== Sultan Kudarat ==
Each of Sultan Kudarat's two legislative districts will elect each representative to the House of Representatives. The candidate with the highest number of votes wins the seat.

=== 1st District ===
Raden Sakaluran is the incumbent but not seeking for reelection. He is running for vice-governor instead.

2016 Philippine House of Representatives election at Sultan Kudarat's 1st District
Party	Candidate	Votes	%
PTM	Suharto Mangudadatu	92,385	74.52
Liberal	Carlos Valdez Jr.	31,583	25.48
Total votes		123,968	100.00
PTM hold			

=== 2nd District ===
Arnulfo Go is the incumbent but is ineligible for reelection due to term limits. His party nominated his wife Amelia Go.

2016 Philippine House of Representatives election at Sultan Kudarat's 2nd District
Party	Candidate	Votes	%
Liberal	Horacio Suansing Jr.	39,042	35.13
PTM	Kahirup Ang	38,090	34.28
NUP	Amelia Go	32,893	29.60
Independent	Freiding Alejaga	1,099	0.99
Total votes		111,124	100.00
Liberal gain from NUP			
