= Soccsksargen General Hospital =

Government hospital in South Cotabato, Philippines

Geography
- Location: Surallah, South Cotabato, Soccsksargen, Philippines
- Coordinates: 6°21′55″N 124°44′05″E

Organization
- Funding: Government hospital

Soccsksargen General Hospital is a government hospital in the Philippines. It is located in Barangay Dajay, Surallah, South Cotabato.
