= 2013 Philippine House of Representatives elections in Soccsksargen =

Elections were held in Soccsksargen for seats in the House of Representatives of the Philippines on May 13, 2013.

The candidate with the most votes won that district's seat for the 16th Congress of the Philippines.

== Summary ==
Party	Popular vote	%	Swing	Seats won	Change
Liberal				2	
NPC				2	
NUP				1	
UNA				1	
Independent				2	
Valid votes				8	
Invalid votes					
Turnout					
Registered voters					

== Cotabato ==
Cotabato was redistricted into three districts from two.

=== 1st District ===
Jesus Sacdalan is the incumbent.

2013 Philippine House of Representatives election at Cotabato's 1st district
Party	Candidate	Votes	%
Liberal	Jesus Sacdalan (incumbent)	109,987	70.63
Independent	Anthony Dequina	27,043	17.37
UNA	Fernando Sacdalan	18,692	12.00
Total votes		155,722	100.00
Liberal hold			

=== 2nd District ===
Incumbent 2nd district representative Nancy Catamco is running here. Former representative Bernardo Piñol Jr. is his main opponent.

2013 Philippine House of Representatives election at Cotabato's 2nd district
Party	Candidate	Votes	%
Liberal	Nancy Catamco (incumbent)	70,054	46.95
Independent	Bernardo Piñol Jr.	54,925	36.81
Independent	Gregorio Andolana	24,244	16.25
Total votes		149,223	100.00
Liberal hold			

=== 3rd District ===
The third district covers the central part of the province. Senior Board Member Jose Tejada is running here.

2013 Philippine House of Representatives election at Cotabato's 3rd district
Party	Candidate	Votes	%
Independent	Jose Tejada	71,978	58.53
NPC	Rodrigo Escudero	47,582	38.69
Independent	Amin Sindao	3,422	2.78
Total votes		122,982	100.00
Independent win (new seat)			

== Sarangani ==
Eight-division world boxing champion and incumbent Manny Pacquiao is running unopposed. He is co-nominated by his People's Champ Movement.

2013 Philippine House of Representatives election at Sarangani
Party	Candidate	Votes	%
UNA	Manny Pacquiao (incumbent)	149,135	100.00
Total votes		149,135	100.00
UNA hold			

== South Cotabato ==
=== 1st District ===
Pedro Acharon is the incumbent. His opponent is Rogelio Pacquiao, if elected, he will join his brother Manny in the House separately.

2013 Philippine House of Representatives election at South Cotabato's 1st district
Party	Candidate	Votes	%
NPC	Pedro Acharon	138,079	51.43
UNA	Rogelio Pacquiao	130,377	48.57
Total votes		268,456	100.00
NPC hold			

=== 2nd District ===
Incumbent Daisy Avance-Fuentes is running for governor. Ferdinand Hernandez is her party's nominee.

2013 Philippine House of Representatives election at South Cotabato's 2nd district
Party	Candidate	Votes	%
NPC	Ferdinand Hernandez	121,933	57.14
UNA	Elmo Tolosa	89,776	42.07
Independent	Efren Biclar	1,338	0.63
Independent	Netz Varona	338	0.16
Total votes		213,385	100.00
NPC hold			

== Sultan Kudarat ==
=== 1st District ===
Raden Sakaluran is the incumbent.

2013 Philippine House of Representatives election at Sultan Kudarat's 1st district
Party	Candidate	Votes	%
Independent	Raden Sakaluran (incumbent)	81,110	60.38
Liberal	Carlos Valdez Jr.	53,229	39.62
Total votes		134,339	100.00
Independent hold			

=== 2nd District ===
Arnulfo Go is the incumbent.

2013 Philippine House of Representatives election at Sultan Kudarat's 2nd district
Party	Candidate	Votes	%
NUP	Arnulfo Go (incumbent)	83,037	89.34
Independent	Roberto Examen	9,913	10.66
Total votes		92,950	100.00
NUP hold			
