= Dinand Hernandez =

Filipino politician

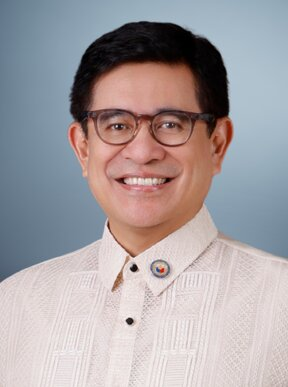
- Official portrait, 2025

Senior Deputy Speaker of the House of Representatives of the Philippines
- Incumbent
- Assumed office November 19, 2025
- Speaker: Bojie Dy
- Preceded by: David Suarez

Deputy Speaker of the House of Representatives of the Philippines
- In office October 10, 2025 – November 19, 2025
- Speaker: Bojie Dy
- In office July 22, 2019 – June 30, 2022
- Speaker: Alan Peter Cayetano (2019–2020); Lord Allan Velasco (2020–2022)
- In office August 16, 2016 – June 30, 2019
- Speaker: Pantaleon Alvarez (2016–2018); Gloria Macapagal Arroyo (2018–2019)

Member of the Philippine House of Representatives from South Cotabato's 2nd district
- Incumbent
- Assumed office June 30, 2025
- Preceded by: Peter B. Miguel
- In office June 30, 2013 – June 30, 2022
- Preceded by: Daisy Fuentes
- Succeeded by: Peter B. Miguel

Personal details
- Born: Ferdinand Ledesma Hernandez
- Party: PFP (2024–present)
- Other political affiliations: PDP (2016–2024); NPC (2012–2016)
- Education: University of Santo Tomas (BA); Ateneo de Manila University (JD); University of Wales (MA)

Ferdinand "Dinand" Ledesma Hernandez is a Filipino lawyer and politician who has served as the representative for South Cotabato's second district since 2025, a position he previously held from 2013 to 2022. A member of the Partido Federal ng Pilipinas, he is currently serving as the Senior Deputy Speaker of the House of Representatives since November 19, 2025. He was previously elected as House Deputy Speaker on October 10, 2025.

== Political career ==
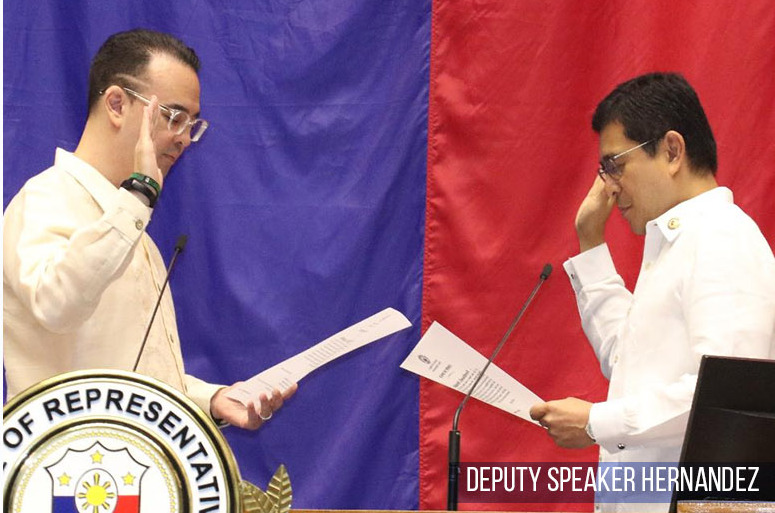
Hernandez taking his oath of office as Deputy House Speaker on July 27, 2019

Hernandez first served as a Member of the House of Representatives in 2013, holding the position until 2022. He returned to Congress for another term beginning in 2025.

In 2019, he was appointed as one of the Deputy Speakers of the House of Representatives, a position he held until 2022.

Hernandez ran for Governor of South Cotabato in 2022 but was unsuccessful.

== Government service ==
Before and between his terms in Congress, Hernandez held several positions in the executive branch, including:

- Undersecretary, Office of the President
- Assistant Secretary, Department of Tourism (DOT)
- Assistant Secretary, Department of Trade and Industry (DTI)
- Deputy Administrator and Senior Administrator for Operations, Subic Bay Metropolitan Authority (SBMA)

== Electoral history ==
Electoral history of Ferdinand Hernandez
Year	Office	Party	Votes received				Result
Year	Office	Party	Total	%	P.	Swing	Result
2013	Representative (South Cotabato–2nd)	NPC	121,933	57.14	1st	—N/a	Won
2016	Representative (South Cotabato–2nd)	PDP–Laban	142,817	62.45	1st	+5.31	Won
2019	Representative (South Cotabato–2nd)	PDP–Laban	222,524		1st		Won
2022	Governor of South Cotabato	PDP–Laban	229,628	47.31	2nd	—N/a	Lost
2025	Representative (South Cotabato–2nd)	PFP	103,984	58.08	1st		Won
