= South Cotabato's 2nd congressional district =

Congressional districts in the Philippines

- Constituency for the House of Representatives of the Philippines
- Location of South Cotabato within the Philippines
- Province: South Cotabato
- Region: Soccsksargen
- Population: 341,950 (2024)
- Electorate: 211,517 (2025)
- Major settlements: 3 LGUs: Cities; Koronadal; Municipalities; Banga; Tantangan
- Area: 630.45 km^{2} (243.42 sq mi)

Current constituency
- Created: 1987
- Representative: Ferdinand L. Hernandez
- Political party: PFP
- Congressional bloc: Majority

South Cotabato's 2nd congressional district is one of the two congressional districts of the Philippines in the province of South Cotabato. It has been represented in the House of Representatives since 1987. The district covers the provincial capital city, Koronadal, and two adjacent municipalities, namely Banga, and Tantangan. It is currently represented in the 20th Congress by Ferdinand L. Hernandez of the PFP.

Beginning in 2025, Lake Sebu, Norala, Santo Niño, Surallah, and T'boli will be represented under the recreated third district, pursuant to a 2022 law reapportioning South Cotabato.

== Representation history ==
#	Image	Member	Term of office		Congress	Party	Electoral history	Constituent LGUs
#	Image	Member	Start	End	Congress	Party	Electoral history	Constituent LGUs
=== South Cotabato's 2nd district for the House of Representatives of the Philippines ===
District created February 2, 1987 from South Cotabato's at-large district.
1		Hilario L. de Pedro III	June 30, 1987	June 30, 1992	8th	UNIDO	Elected in 1987.	1987–2025; Banga, Koronadal, Lake Sebu, Norala, Santo Niño, Surallah, Tantangan, T'boli
2		Daisy Avance Fuentes	June 30, 1992	June 30, 2001	9th	Lakas	Elected in 1992.	1987–2025; Banga, Koronadal, Lake Sebu, Norala, Santo Niño, Surallah, Tantangan, T'boli
2		Daisy Avance Fuentes	June 30, 1992	June 30, 2001	10th	Lakas	Re-elected in 1995.	1987–2025; Banga, Koronadal, Lake Sebu, Norala, Santo Niño, Surallah, Tantangan, T'boli
2		Daisy Avance Fuentes	June 30, 1992	June 30, 2001	11th	NPC (LAMMP)	Re-elected in 1998.	1987–2025; Banga, Koronadal, Lake Sebu, Norala, Santo Niño, Surallah, Tantangan, T'boli
3		Arthur Y. Pingoy Jr.	June 30, 2001	June 30, 2010	12th	NPC	Elected in 2001.	1987–2025; Banga, Koronadal, Lake Sebu, Norala, Santo Niño, Surallah, Tantangan, T'boli
3		Arthur Y. Pingoy Jr.	June 30, 2001	June 30, 2010	13th	NPC	Re-elected in 2004.	1987–2025; Banga, Koronadal, Lake Sebu, Norala, Santo Niño, Surallah, Tantangan, T'boli
3		Arthur Y. Pingoy Jr.	June 30, 2001	June 30, 2010	14th	Lakas	Re-elected in 2007.	1987–2025; Banga, Koronadal, Lake Sebu, Norala, Santo Niño, Surallah, Tantangan, T'boli
(2)		Daisy Avance Fuentes	June 30, 2010	June 30, 2013	15th	NPC	Elected in 2010.	1987–2025; Banga, Koronadal, Lake Sebu, Norala, Santo Niño, Surallah, Tantangan, T'boli
4		Ferdinand L. Hernandez	June 30, 2013	June 30, 2022	16th	NPC (AIM)	Elected in 2013.	1987–2025; Banga, Koronadal, Lake Sebu, Norala, Santo Niño, Surallah, Tantangan, T'boli
4		Ferdinand L. Hernandez	June 30, 2013	June 30, 2022	17th	PDP–Laban	Re-elected in 2016.	1987–2025; Banga, Koronadal, Lake Sebu, Norala, Santo Niño, Surallah, Tantangan, T'boli
4		Ferdinand L. Hernandez	June 30, 2013	June 30, 2022	18th	PDP–Laban	Re-elected in 2019.	1987–2025; Banga, Koronadal, Lake Sebu, Norala, Santo Niño, Surallah, Tantangan, T'boli
5		Peter B. Miguel	June 30, 2022	June 30, 2025	19th	PFP	Elected in 2022.	1987–2025; Banga, Koronadal, Lake Sebu, Norala, Santo Niño, Surallah, Tantangan, T'boli
5		Peter B. Miguel	June 30, 2022	June 30, 2025	19th	Lakas	Elected in 2022.	1987–2025; Banga, Koronadal, Lake Sebu, Norala, Santo Niño, Surallah, Tantangan, T'boli
(4)		Ferdinand L. Hernandez	June 30, 2025	Incumbent	20th	PFP	Elected in 2025.	2025–present Banga, Koronadal, Tantangan

== Election results ==
=== 2019 ===
Candidate	Party	Votes	%
Dinand Hernandez	PDP–Laban	222,524	81.89
Marieta Causing	Partido Federal ng Pilipinas	47,516	17.49
Darius Solis	Independent	1,705	0.63
Total		271,745	100.00

=== 2016 ===
Philippine House of Representatives election at South Cotabato's 2nd district
Party	Candidate	Votes	%
NPC	Ferdinand Hernandez	142,817	62.45
Independent	Arturo Pingoy Jr.	85,883	37.55
Total votes		228,700	100.00
NPC hold			

=== 2010 ===
Philippine House of Representatives election at South Cotabato's 2nd district
Party	Candidate	Votes	%
NPC	Daisy Avance Fuentes	130,602	58.66
Lakas–Kampi	Hilario de Pedro III	80,653	36.22
Valid ballots		211,255	94.88
Invalid or blank votes		11,395	5.12
Total votes		222,650	100.00
NPC gain from Lakas–Kampi			

== See also ==
- Legislative districts of South Cotabato
- South Cotabato's 1st congressional district
- South Cotabato's 3rd congressional district
- General Santos's at-large congressional district
- Legislative districts of Cotabato
- Legislative districts of Sarangani
- Legislative districts of Sultan Kudarat
