= Tantangan =

Municipality in South Cotabato, Philippines

- Municipality
- Municipality of Tantangan

Other transcription(s)
  - Jawi: تنتاڠن
- Municipal Hall

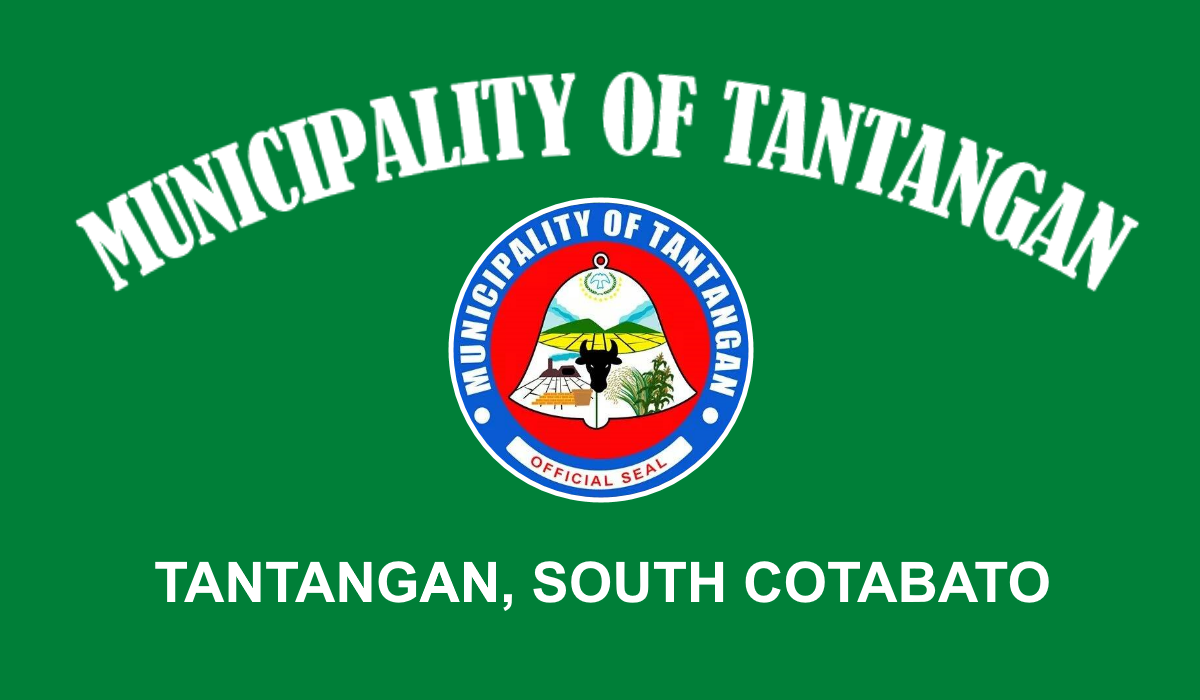
- Flag Seal

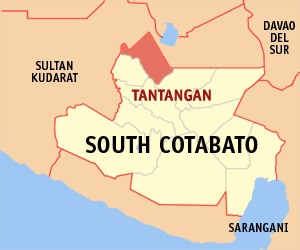
- Map of South Cotabato with Tantangan highlighted
- Interactive map of Tantangan
- Location within the Philippines
- Coordinates: 6°37′08″N 124°44′54″E
- Country: Philippines
- Region: Soccsksargen
- Province: South Cotabato
- District: 2nd district
- Founded 1901 to 1957.: January 27, 1961
- Barangays: 13 (see Barangays)

Government
  - Type: Sangguniang Bayan
  - Mayor: Timee Joy Torres Gonzales
  - Vice Mayor: Cesar Dasilao
  - Representative: Ferdinand L. Hernandez
  - Electorate: 28,827 voters (2025)

Area
  - Total: 113.10 km^{2} (43.67 sq mi)
- Elevation: 207 m (679 ft)
- Highest elevation: 1,121 m (3,678 ft)
- Lowest elevation: 7 m (23 ft)

Population (2024 census)
  - Total: 48,570
  - Density: 429.4/km^{2} (1,112/sq mi)
  - Households: 11,794

Economy
  - Income class: 2nd municipal income class
  - Poverty incidence: 16.09% (2023)
  - Revenue: ₱ 200.6 million (2024)
  - Assets: ₱ 448.1 million (2024)
  - Expenditure: ₱ 198.8 million (2024)
  - Liabilities: ₱ 210.5 million (2024)

Service provider
  - Electricity: South Cotabato 1 Electric Cooperative (SOCOTECO 1)
- Time zone: UTC+8 (PST)
- ZIP code: 9510
- PSGC: 1206315000
- IDD : area code: +63 (0)83
- Native languages: Hiligaynon; Cebuano; Maguindanao; Blaan; Tagalog
- Website: www.tantanganscot.gov.ph

Tantangan, officially the Municipality of Tantangan (Hiligaynon: Banwa sang Tantangan; Cebuano: Lungsod sa Tantangan; Ilocano: Ili ti Tantangan; Maguindanaon: Inged nu Tantangan, Jawi: ايڠد نو تنتاڠن; Tagalog: Bayan ng Tantangan), is a municipality in the province of South Cotabato, Philippines. According to the 2024 census, it has a population of 48,570 people.

== History ==
Tantangan was created from Tacurong through Executive Order No. 415 signed by President Carlos P. Garcia on January 27, 1961.

== Geography ==
=== Barangays ===
Tantangan is politically subdivided into 13 barangays. Each barangay consists of puroks while some have sitios.

- Bukay Pait
- Cabuling
- Dumadalig
- Libas
- Magon Baguiland
- Maibo
- Mangilala
- New Cuyapo
- New Iloilo
- New Lambunao
- Poblacion
- San Felipe
- Tinongcop

=== Climate ===
Climate data for Tantangan, South Cotabato
Month	Jan	Feb	Mar	Apr	May	Jun	Jul	Aug	Sep	Oct	Nov	Dec	Year
Mean daily maximum °C (°F)	31 (88)	31 (88)	32 (90)	32 (90)	31 (88)	30 (86)	29 (84)	30 (86)	30 (86)	30 (86)	30 (86)	31 (88)	31 (87)
Mean daily minimum °C (°F)	23 (73)	23 (73)	23 (73)	24 (75)	24 (75)	24 (75)	24 (75)	24 (75)	24 (75)	24 (75)	24 (75)	23 (73)	24 (74)
Average precipitation mm (inches)	64 (2.5)	45 (1.8)	59 (2.3)	71 (2.8)	140 (5.5)	179 (7.0)	192 (7.6)	198 (7.8)	163 (6.4)	147 (5.8)	113 (4.4)	66 (2.6)	1,437 (56.5)
Average rainy days	12.2	10.3	12.7	15.7	26.0	27.4	28.1	28.2	26.0	26.7	22.9	16.6	252.8
Source: Meteoblue

== Demographics ==
Population census of Tantangan
Year	Pop.	±% p.a.
1960	12,644	—
1970	15,943	+2.34%
1975	17,147	+1.47%
1980	22,207	+5.31%
1990	26,346	+1.72%
1995	30,044	+2.49%
2000	32,636	+1.79%
2007	35,825	+1.29%
2010	40,461	+4.53%
2015	43,245	+1.28%
2020	45,744	+1.19%
2024	48,570	+1.45%
Source: Philippine Statistics Authority

== Economy ==
Poverty incidence of Tantangan (%)

Source: Philippine Statistics Authority
