= Lake Sebu (municipality) =

Municipality in South Cotabato, Philippines

Lake Sebu Sbù
- Municipality
- Municipality of Lake Sebu
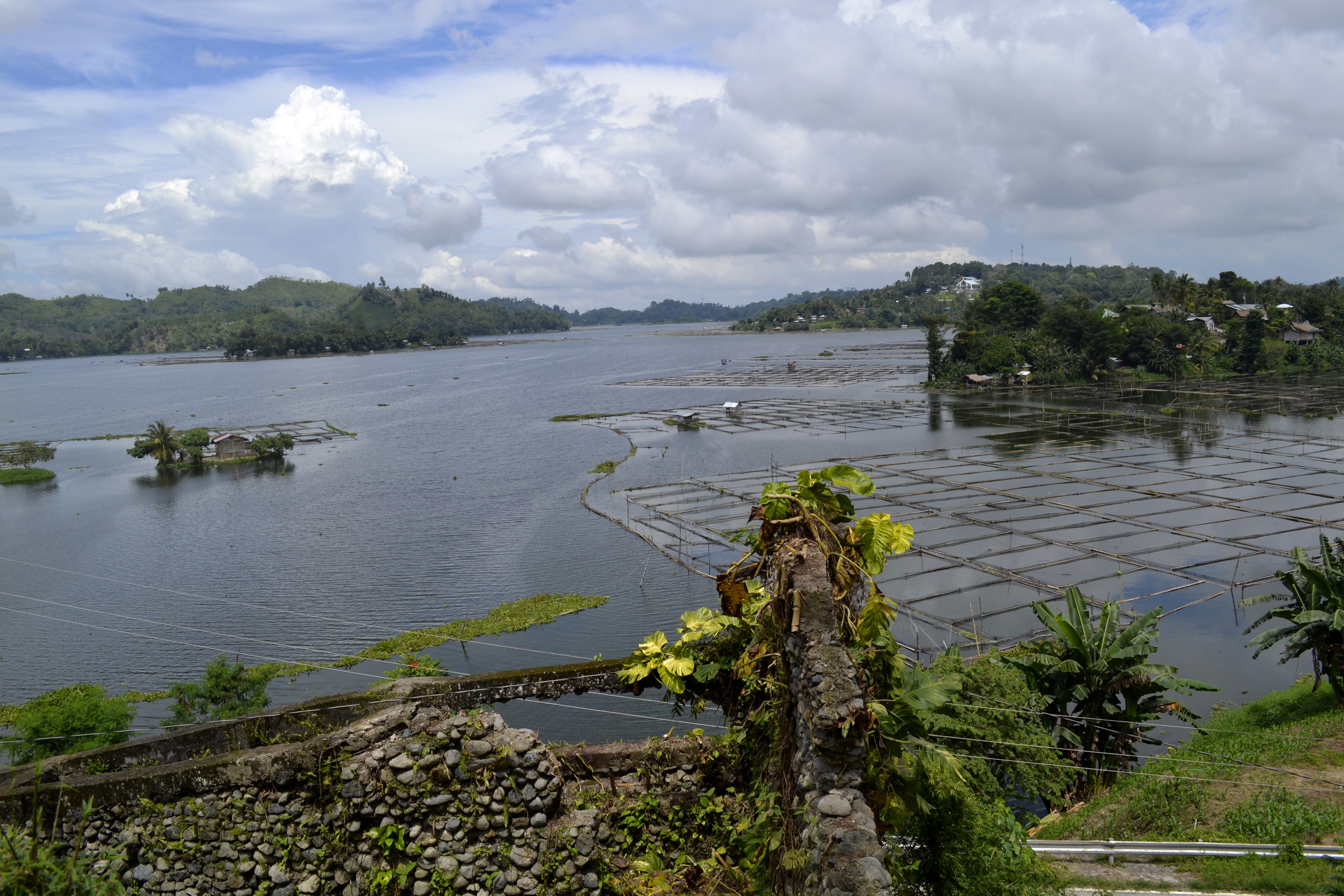
- The eponymous Lake Sebu

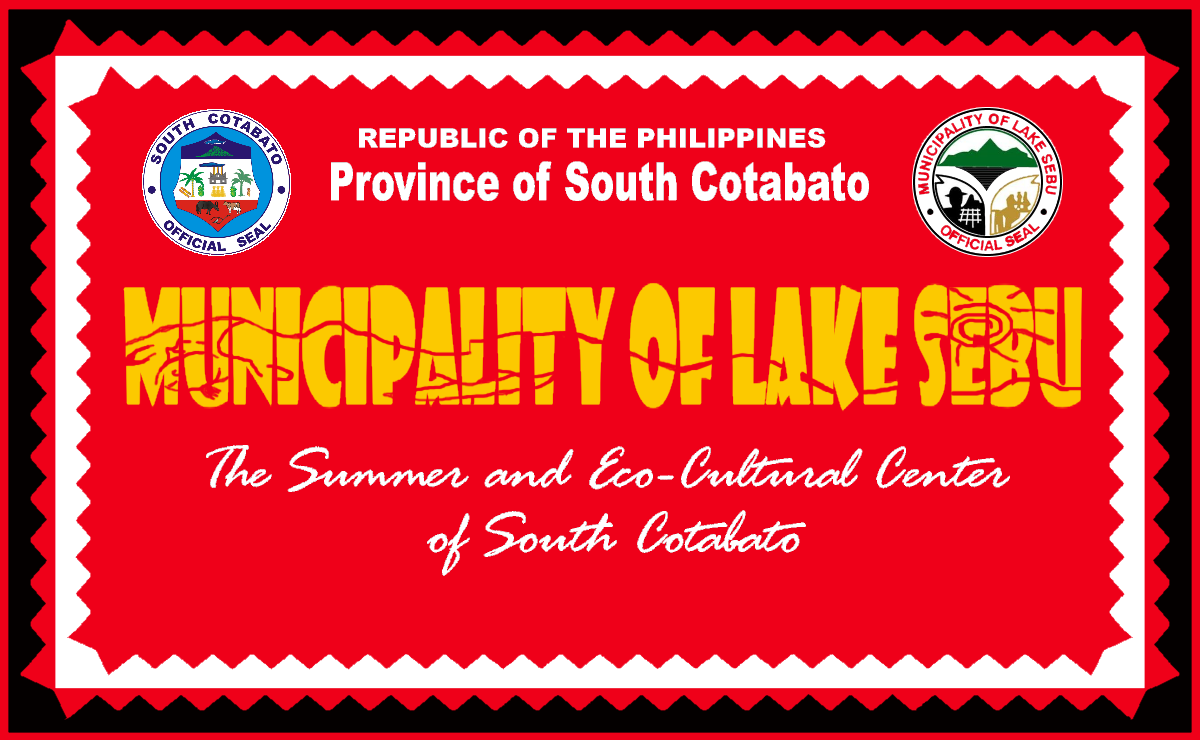
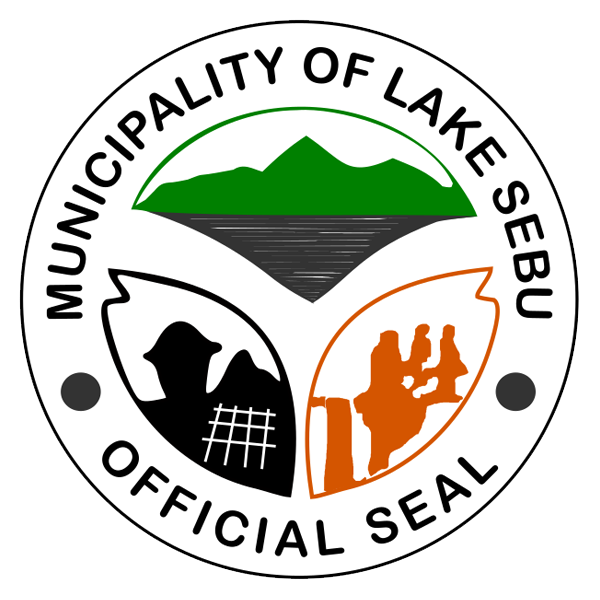
- Flag Seal
- Nicknames: Home of the T'nalak Weavers(ing); Philippines' Natural Wonder; Summer Capital of Southern Mindanao; Bowl of Forest and Mountains
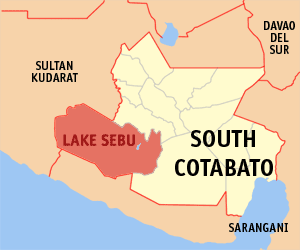
- Map of South Cotabato with Lake Sebu (municipality) highlighted
- Interactive map of Lake Sebu
- Location within the Philippines
- Coordinates: 6°13′34″N 124°42′44″E
- Country: Philippines
- Region: Soccsksargen
- Province: South Cotabato
- District: 2nd district
- Barangays: 19 (see Barangays)

Government
  - Type: Sangguniang Bayan
  - Mayor: Remie M. Unggol
  - Vice Mayor: Liezel T. Isuga
  - Representative: Peter B. Miguel
  - Municipal Council: Members: Charles Jerry E. Larido; Ornalfo S. Estares; Vicente F. Somido; Stephen T. Ofong; Jimmy G. Baay; Judy L. Artacho; Basilio L. Salif Jr.; Vacant
  - Electorate: 50,183 voters (2025)

Area
  - Total: 702.00 km^{2} (271.04 sq mi)
- Elevation: 781 m (2,562 ft)
- Highest elevation: 1,570 m (5,150 ft)
- Lowest elevation: 364 m (1,194 ft)

Population (2024 census)
  - Total: 84,252
  - Density: 120.02/km^{2} (310.84/sq mi)
  - Households: 18,969

Economy
  - Income class: 1st municipal income class
  - Poverty incidence: 32.96% (?)
  - Revenue: ₱ 442.7 million (2024)
  - Assets: ₱ 719.5 million (2024)
  - Expenditure: ₱ 441.8 million (2024)
  - Liabilities: ₱ 225 million (2024)

Service provider
  - Electricity: South Cotabato 1 Electric Cooperative (SOCOTECO 1)
- Time zone: UTC+8 (PST)
- ZIP code: 9506
- PSGC: 1206319000
- IDD : area code: +63 (0)83
- Native languages: Tboli; Hiligaynon; Cebuano; Blaan; Tagalog; Maguindanaon
- Website: lakesebuscot.gov.ph

Lake Sebu, officially the Municipality of Lake Sebu (Tboli: Benwu Sbù, /sbuʔ/; Hiligaynon: Banwa sang Sëbu /səˈbuʔ/; Tagalog: Bayan ng Sëbu), is a municipality in the province of South Cotabato, Philippines. According to the 2024 census, it has a population of 84,252 people.

Lonely Planet described Lake Sebu as a place located in a "bowl of forests and mountains". The 42,450-hectare landscape consisting the domains of the Allah Valley is recognized by United Nations Educational, Scientific and Cultural Organization (UNESCO) as a cultural landscape in Mindanao.

== History ==
Lake Sebu was officially created as an independent municipality in South Cotabato through Batas Pambansa Blg. 249, which was approved on November 11, 1982, and ratified via a plebiscite on October 15, 1983.

== Geography ==
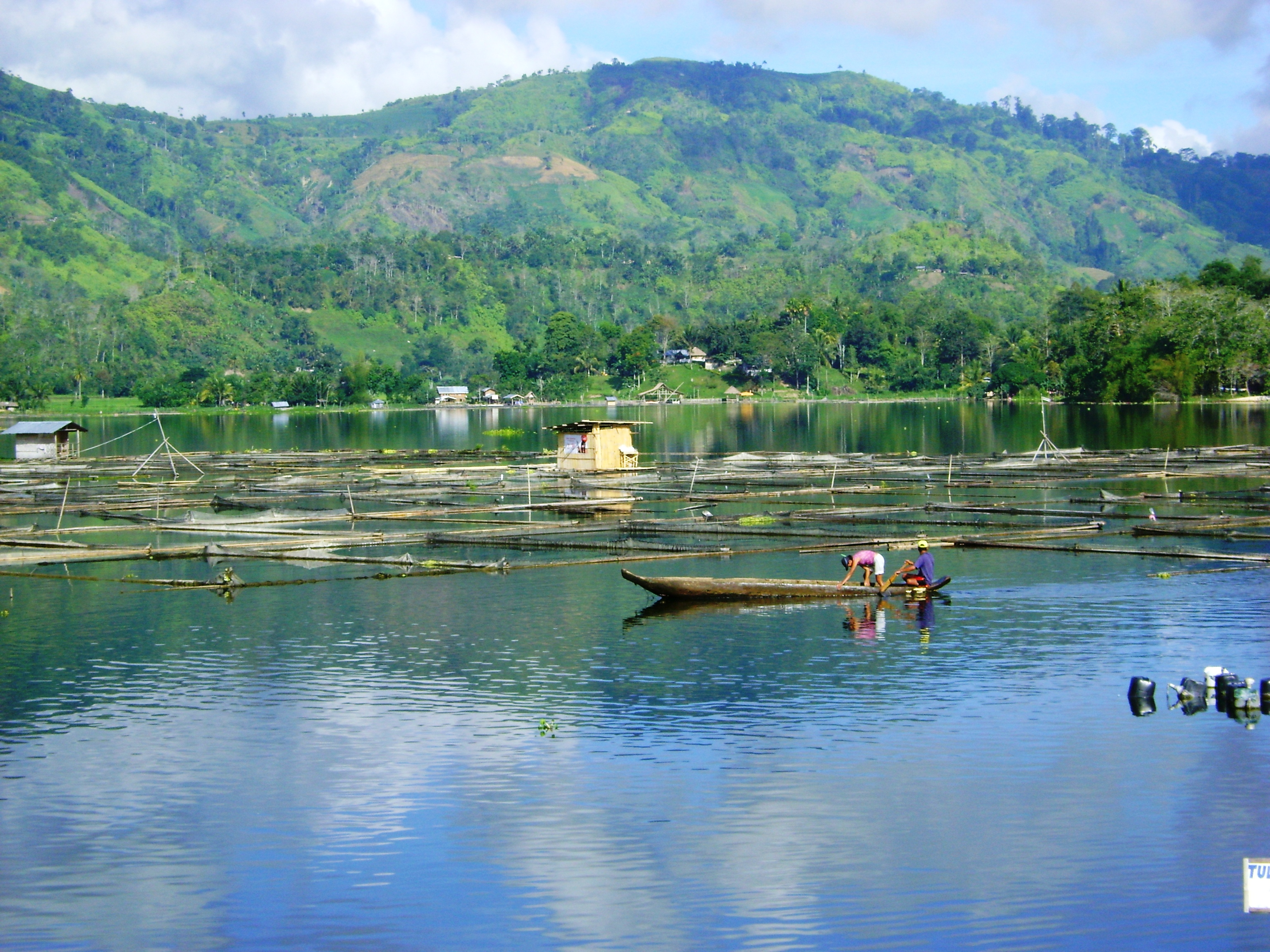
Lake Sebu

The placid lake of Lake Sebu can be found in Allah Valley near the municipality of Surallah, South Cotabato. Surrounded by rolling hills and mountains covered with thick rain forest, the lake has an area of 361.124 hectares (892.36 acres), with an elevation of approximately 1,000 metres (3,300 ft).

=== Barangays ===
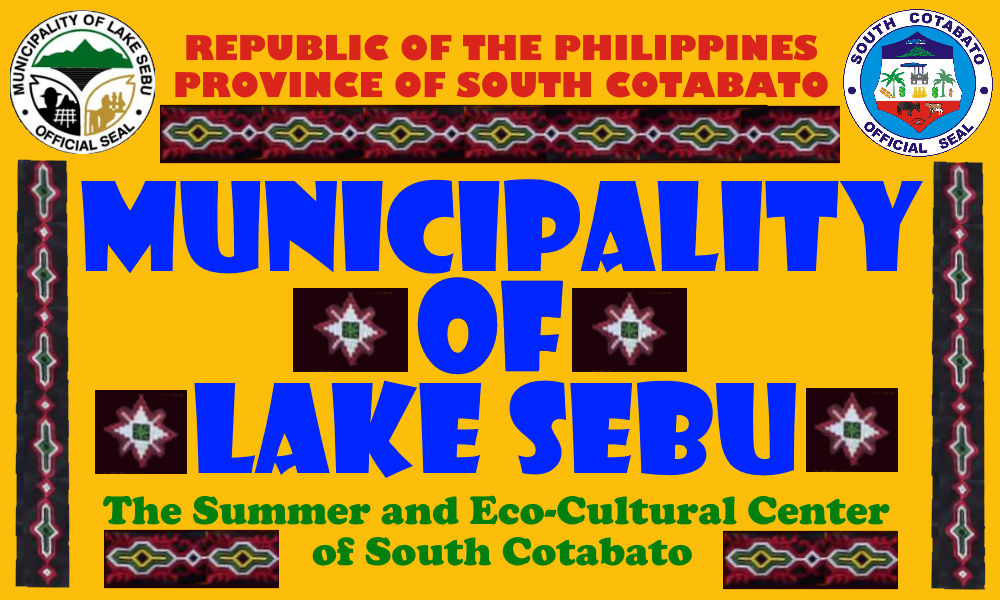
Former flag of Lake Sebu

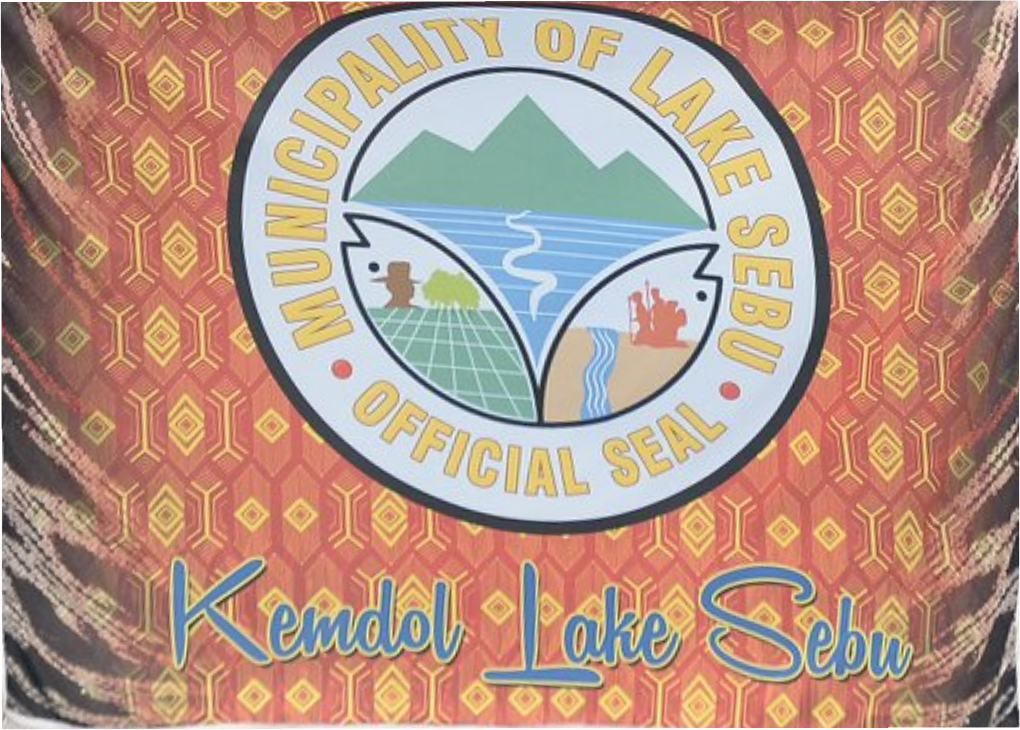
Alternate flag of Lake Sebu

Lake Sebu is politically subdivided into 19 barangays. Each barangay consists of puroks while some have sitios.

- Bacdulong
- Denlag
- Halilan
- Hanoon
- Klubi
- Lake Lahit
- Lake Seloton
- Lamcade
- Lamdalag
- Lamfugon
- Lamlahak
- Lower Maculan
- Luhib
- Ned
- Poblacion
- Takunel
- Talisay
- Tasiman
- Upper Maculan

=== Climate ===
Climate data for Lake Sebu, South Cotabato
Month	Jan	Feb	Mar	Apr	May	Jun	Jul	Aug	Sep	Oct	Nov	Dec	Year
Mean daily maximum °C (°F)	27 (81)	27 (81)	27 (81)	27 (81)	26 (79)	25 (77)	25 (77)	25 (77)	26 (79)	26 (79)	26 (79)	26 (79)	26 (79)
Mean daily minimum °C (°F)	19 (66)	19 (66)	20 (68)	20 (68)	21 (70)	21 (70)	20 (68)	20 (68)	20 (68)	21 (70)	20 (68)	20 (68)	20 (68)
Average precipitation mm (inches)	146 (5.7)	121 (4.8)	164 (6.5)	212 (8.3)	347 (13.7)	397 (15.6)	364 (14.3)	366 (14.4)	302 (11.9)	308 (12.1)	280 (11.0)	192 (7.6)	3,199 (125.9)
Average rainy days	16.7	15.5	19.4	22.7	29.0	28.9	27.9	27.5	26.5	28.1	27.2	22.6	292
Source: Meteoblue

== Demographics ==
Population census of Lake Sebu (municipality)
Year	Pop.	±% p.a.
1990	34,350	—
1995	47,617	+6.31%
2000	54,142	+2.79%
2007	60,401	+1.52%
2010	76,170	+8.81%
2015	87,442	+2.66%
2020	81,221	−1.54%
2024	84,252	+0.88%
Source: Philippine Statistics Authority

The lake's shores and the surrounding rainforest are home to the Indigenous Tbolis, Tirurays, Ubos, and Manobos. One of the major tribes, the Tbolis are known for their weaving skills and brassware production as well as fishing skills. The rest of the population are made of Maguindanaons, Ilonggos, Cebuanos, Bicolanos, and Ilocanos.

== Economy ==
Poverty incidence of Lake Sebu (%)

Source: Philippine Statistics Authority

The local economy is largely driven by aquaculture, particularly the cultivation of Tilapia in large floating fish cages on the lake. More than half of the surrounding land is used for agriculture. The Philippine government has also been promoting ecotourism in the area. The completion of a concrete road significantly reduced travel time from four hours to less than 30 minutes, thereby improving trade and commerce.

== Wildlife ==
Wild boars and Philippine Deer which are considered endangered live around the lake. The lake and the surrounding rainforest are natural habitat to egrets, kingfishers, swallows, herons, Philippine cockatoos and kites.

== Environmental conservation ==
The Philippine government proclaimed a 924.5 square kilometres (357.0 sq mi) area as a protected landscape. On the south-eastern watershed of the lake, a bamboo plantation was established.
