= Surallah =

Municipality in South Cotabato, Philippines

- Municipality
- Municipality of Surallah

Other transcription(s)
  - Jawi: سورالله
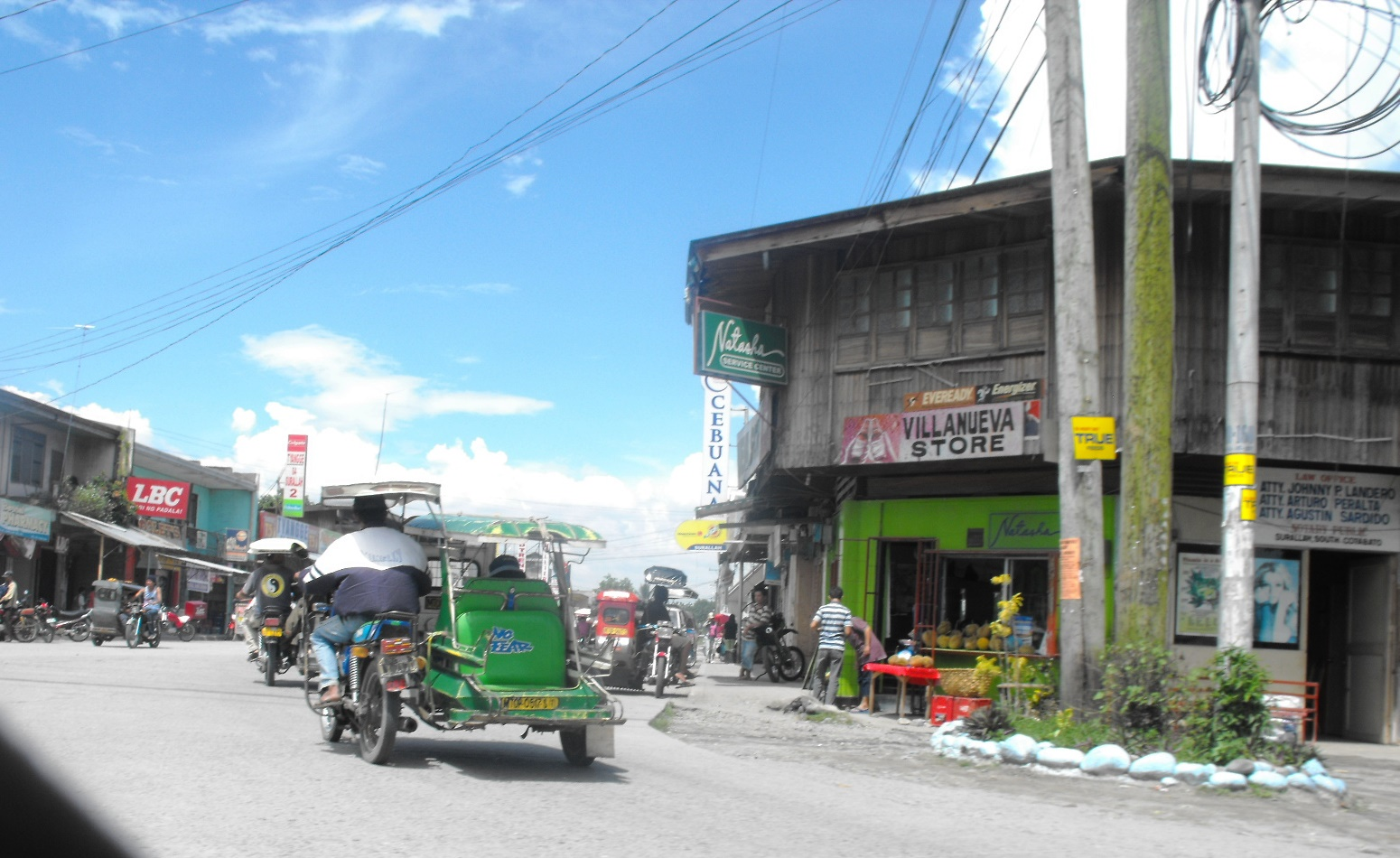

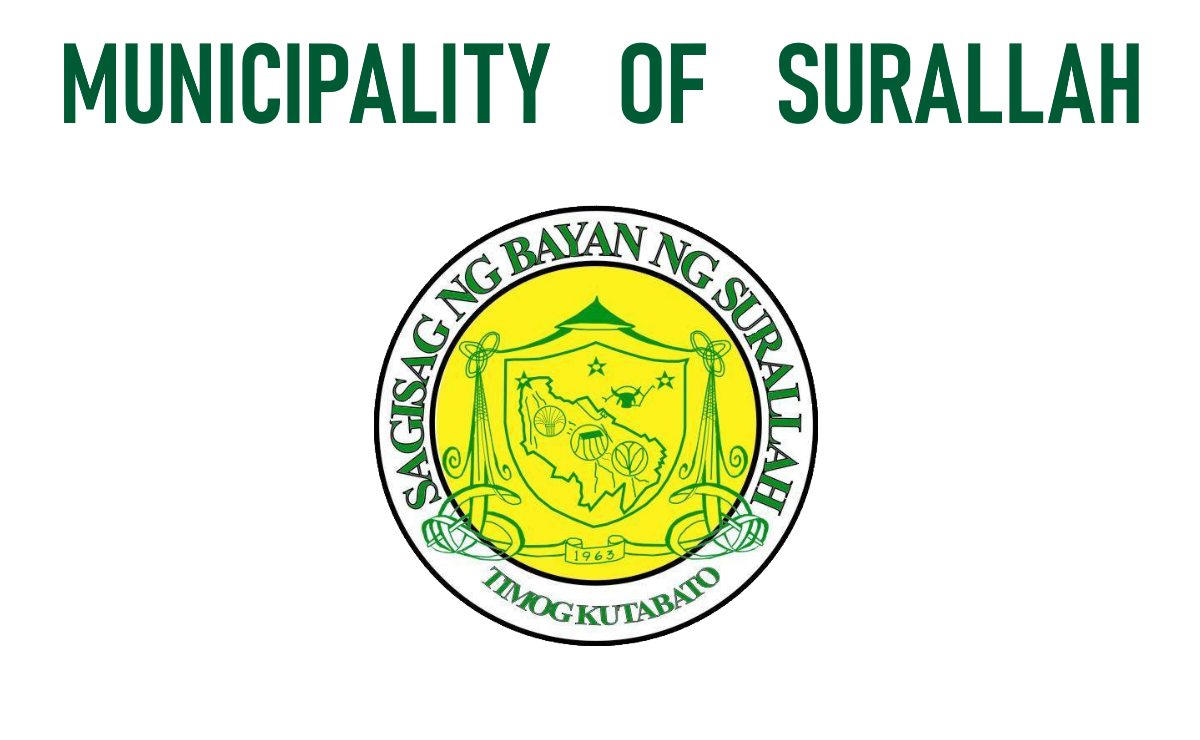
- Flag Seal

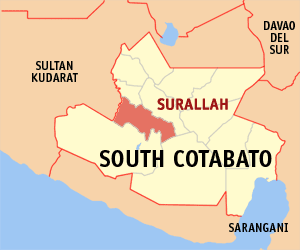
- Map of South Cotabato with Surallah highlighted
- Interactive map of Surallah
- Location within the Philippines
- Coordinates: 6°22′32″N 124°44′50″E
- Country: Philippines
- Region: Soccsksargen
- Province: South Cotabato
- District: 2nd district
- Founded: June 18, 1961
- Barangays: 17 (see Barangays)

Government
  - Type: Sangguniang Bayan
  - Mayor: Pedro M. Matinong, Jr.
  - Vice Mayor: Antonio O. Bendita
  - Representative: Peter B. Miguel
  - Electorate: 56,248 voters (2025)

Area
  - Total: 540.30 km^{2} (208.61 sq mi)
- Elevation: 192 m (630 ft)
- Highest elevation: 421 m (1,381 ft)
- Lowest elevation: 156 m (512 ft)

Population (2024 census)
  - Total: 91,412
  - Density: 169.19/km^{2} (438.19/sq mi)
  - Households: 22,856

Economy
  - Income class: 1st municipal income class
  - Poverty incidence: 14.11% (2023)
  - Revenue: ₱ 519 million (2024)
  - Assets: ₱ 1,487 million (2024)
  - Expenditure: ₱ 481.4 million (2024)
  - Liabilities: ₱ 498.4 million (2024)

Service provider
  - Electricity: South Cotabato 1 Electric Cooperative (SOCOTECO 1)
- Time zone: UTC+8 (PST)
- ZIP code: 9512
- PSGC: 1206313000
- IDD : area code: +63 (0)83
- Native languages: Hiligaynon; Cebuano; Maguindanao; Blaan; Tagalog
- Website: www.surallah.gov.ph

Surallah, officially the Municipality of Surallah (Hiligaynon: Banwa sang Surallah; Maguindanaon: Inged nu Surallah, Jawi: ايڠد نو سورالله), is a municipality in the province of South Cotabato, Philippines. According to the 2024 census, it has a population of 91,412 people.

== History ==
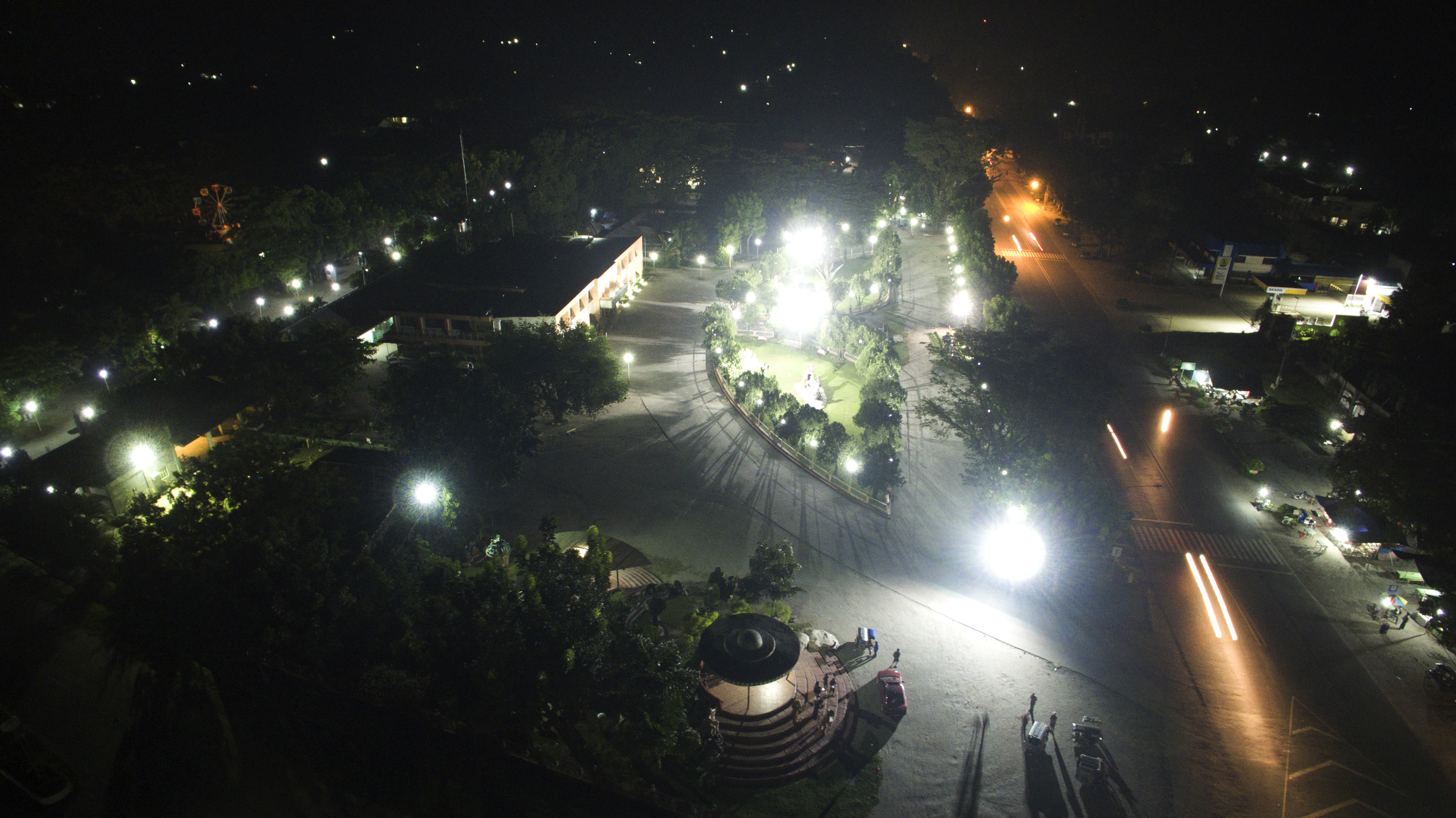
Aerial view of Surallah Municipal Hall at night.

The Municipality of Surallah was created by virtue of Republic Act 3420 on June 18, 1961, as later amended by RA 3664 on June 22, 1963. Its history is generally reckoned with the influx of settlers coming from their abilities under the settlements Programs of NLSA; RPC-NDC; NARRA and LASEDECO.

Surallah started as 6th Class Municipality with 26 barrios and a population of 26,162 settling in a vast land area of 97,000 hectares. The rapid growth of its cluster barrios made the support of the new town. The creation of the Municipality of T’boli in 1964 making six (6) barrios integrated in thus, reducing the total land area to 31,200 hectares. Subsequently, three (3) Barangays were created from their mother barangay; hence, the municipality has 23 officials barangay.

Lately, the booming tourism industry in the south made to be the primary factor of the birth of the new Municipality of Lake Sebu in 1982, causing the reduction of the total land area and population of Surallah from 31,200 to 31,110 hectares and from 52,703 to 42,467 respectively. The separation of Lake Sebu into Municipality made another reduction in the number of barangay from 23 to 17.

The influential leadership of the municipality triggered the tremendous growth development from a small span of years from its creation up to 1990. First, the administration of the Jose T. Sison who served the Municipality from 1963 to 1978 until the election for regional representatives caused Mayor Jose T. Sison to become the Assemblyman of Region XI. Former barrio treasurer of Libertad, Federico Magalona, Jr. was appointed to assume the office until the Local Election of January 31, 1980. The concluded poll gave the mayoralty seat to Conrado P. Haguisan to serve from seat Lorenzo Delmo until November 21, 1987, who vacated the post to run in the January 18, 1988 election. From December 1, 1987, to January 31, 1988, former OIC Councilor Fransisco Sodusta served as OIC Mayor. The election in January 1988 gave back the local leadership to former Assemblyman Jose T. Sison as Municipal Mayor of Surallah who served for three terms until May 1998. The race for Local leadership in May election proved to be competitive among aspirants who had eventually won by Romulo O. Solivio. The new leadership brought necessary changes in the administration more specific on a gradual shift from traditional type to a more conventional way of governance by re-inventing new techniques thru dynamic participative approaches.

There is no official source of information regarding the origin of the name of the place, but precolonial settlers had reportedly named the place Šukran Allâh, šukran being the Arabic equivalent of “Thanks be to God.” Colonial-era settlers from Luzón and the Visayas then later modified the name into Surallah which loosely means “South of Allah”. The town's name parallels that of Norala, which itself is a corruption of the Spanish norte del [valle del río] Ala. The origin inhabitants of the area are the tagabilis, a mountain tribe people who moved inward after the arrival of the Christian settlers from Luzon and Visayas. The latest census of May 2000 gave Surallah the Officials population count of 66,208.

In July 1991, Surallah was reclassified from fifth class to third class Municipality being considered as one of the most progressive municipality in the province of South Cotabato. Subsequently, in 1993, it became a second class municipality and later in July 1997 it was reclassified as first class municipality by the Department of Finance. It received recognition as the country's "cleanest and greenest" municipality in 1995 by the Presidential Awards for the Cleanest and Greenest Local Government Units of the Philippines.

Banking on the Potentials for Agro-industrial and commercials developments, the administration geared its program toward making Surallah as the Agro-industrial and commercial center for Allah Valley Area where vision is specifically addressed to. As economic activities flourished in the area, more people especially businessmen settled into the place which contributed much to faster pace of development.

The municipality envisions itself as the agro-industrial and commercial center of the Allah Valley area. To achieve this, it focuses on developing infrastructure, providing economic support services and facilities, and encouraging investment within the municipality.

Key development priorities also include improving social services, conserving natural resources, and protecting the environment. As a rapidly growing municipality, it currently serves as an economic hub for the Allah Valley area.

== Geography ==
Located in Soccsksargen or Region XII of Mindanao Island, the municipality is seated about 20 kilometres (12 mi) south-west of province capital city of Koronadal and about 1,002 kilometres (623 mi) south-south-east of Philippine capital Manila. Based on its urban area, it is 18th biggest municipality of the region and has placed 6th of the biggest municipalities in South Cotabato.

=== Barangays ===
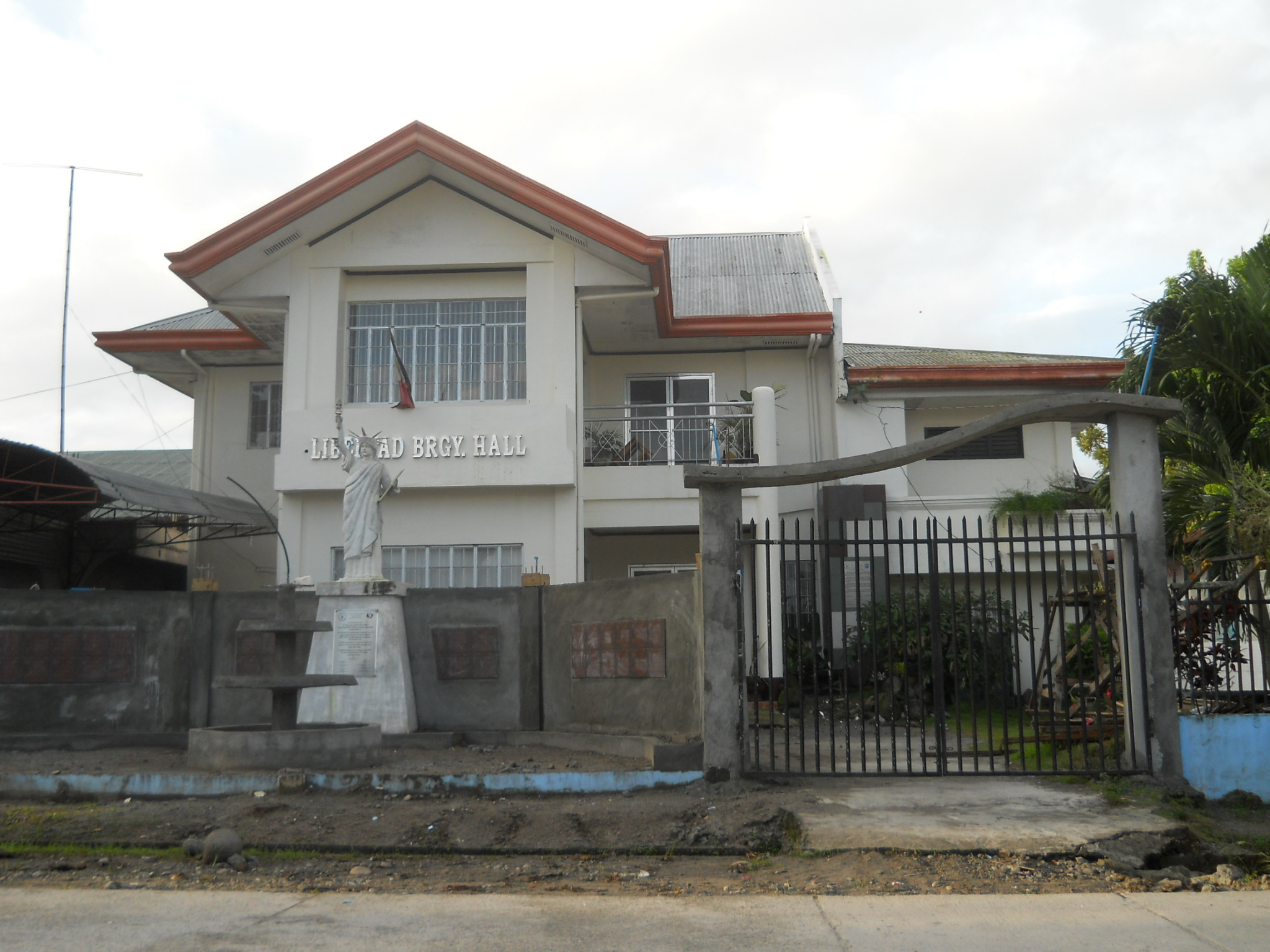
Libertad Barangay Hall

Surallah is politically subdivided into 17 barangays. Each barangay consists of puroks while some have sitios.

One forms the center of the municipality whereas the other 16 are in the outlying areas. Some of them are even several kilometers away from the town proper.

- Buenavista
- Centrala
- Colongulo
- Dajay
- Duengas
- Canahay (Godwino)
- Lambontong
- Lamian
- Lamsugod
- Libertad (Poblacion)
- Little Baguio
- Moloy
- Naci (Doce)
- Talahik
- Tubiala
- Upper Sepaka
- Veterans

=== Climate ===
Climate data for Surallah, South Cotabato
Month	Jan	Feb	Mar	Apr	May	Jun	Jul	Aug	Sep	Oct	Nov	Dec	Year
Mean daily maximum °C (°F)	30 (86)	30 (86)	31 (88)	31 (88)	30 (86)	29 (84)	28 (82)	29 (84)	29 (84)	29 (84)	29 (84)	30 (86)	30 (85)
Mean daily minimum °C (°F)	23 (73)	23 (73)	23 (73)	24 (75)	24 (75)	24 (75)	24 (75)	24 (75)	24 (75)	24 (75)	24 (75)	23 (73)	24 (74)
Average precipitation mm (inches)	146 (5.7)	121 (4.8)	164 (6.5)	212 (8.3)	347 (13.7)	397 (15.6)	364 (14.3)	366 (14.4)	302 (11.9)	308 (12.1)	280 (11.0)	192 (7.6)	3,199 (125.9)
Average rainy days	16.7	15.5	19.4	22.7	29.0	28.9	27.9	27.5	26.5	28.1	27.2	22.6	292
Source: Meteoblue (modeled/calculated data, not measured locally)

== Demographics ==
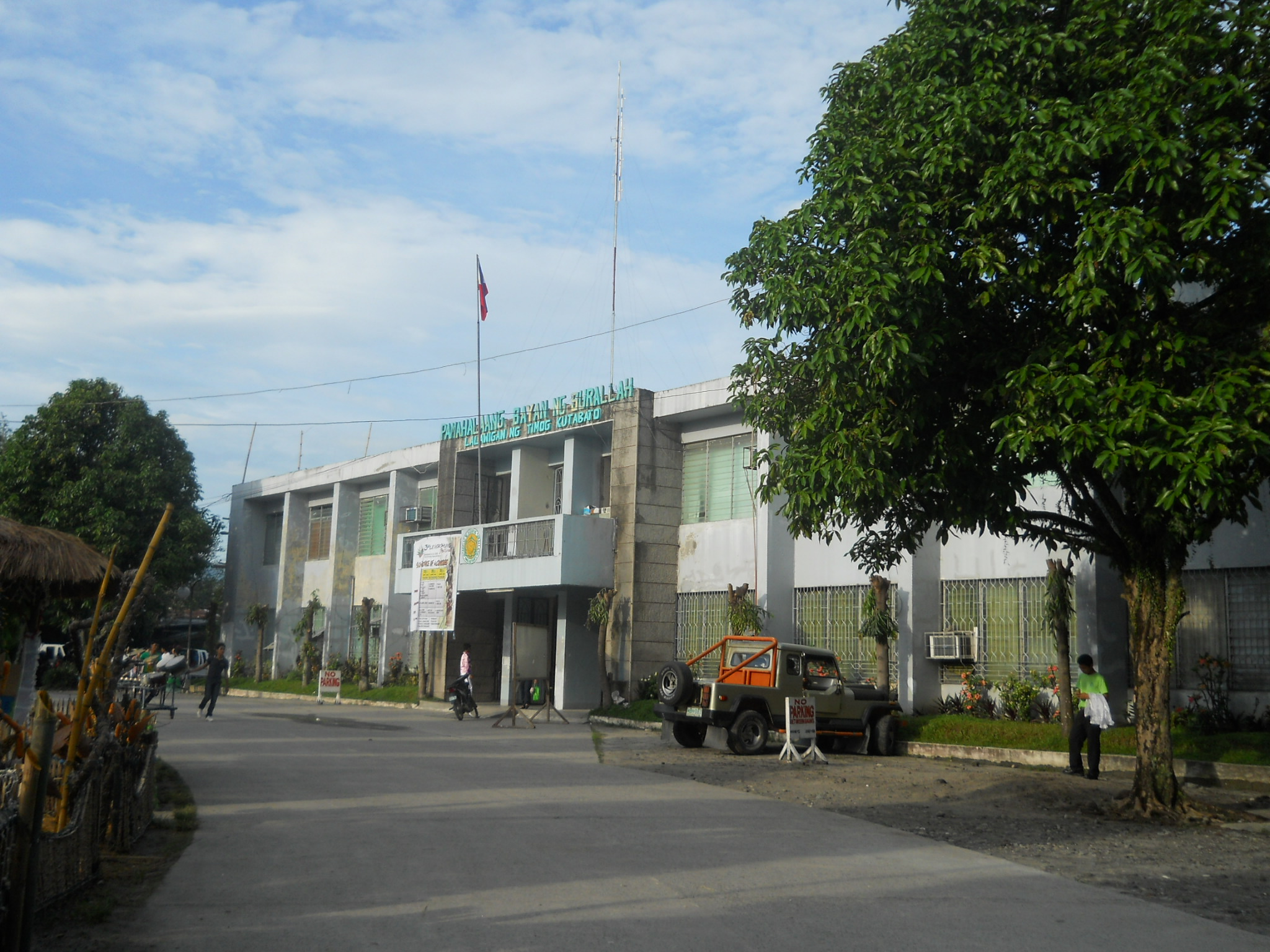
Municipal hall of Surallah

Population census of Surallah

Year	Pop.	±% p.a.
1970	45,631	—
1975	47,165	+0.67%
1980	52,703	+2.24%
1990	54,136	+0.27%
1995	61,509	+2.42%
2000	66,208	+1.59%

Year	Pop.	±% p.a.
2007	71,513	+1.07%
2010	76,035	+2.26%
2015	84,539	+2.04%
2020	89,340	+1.17%
2024	91,412	+0.55%

Source: Philippine Statistics Authority

According to the 2010 census, Surallah has a population of 76,035 residents and belongs to the 294 cities and municipalities in the Philippines which have more than 50,000 inhabitants but did not reach 100,000 yet. Based on the number of its inhabitants Surallah is number 255 of the most populous municipalities of the Philippines and at 59 in Mindanao Island and at 5 of the most populous municipalities of the province of South Cotabato.

== Economy ==
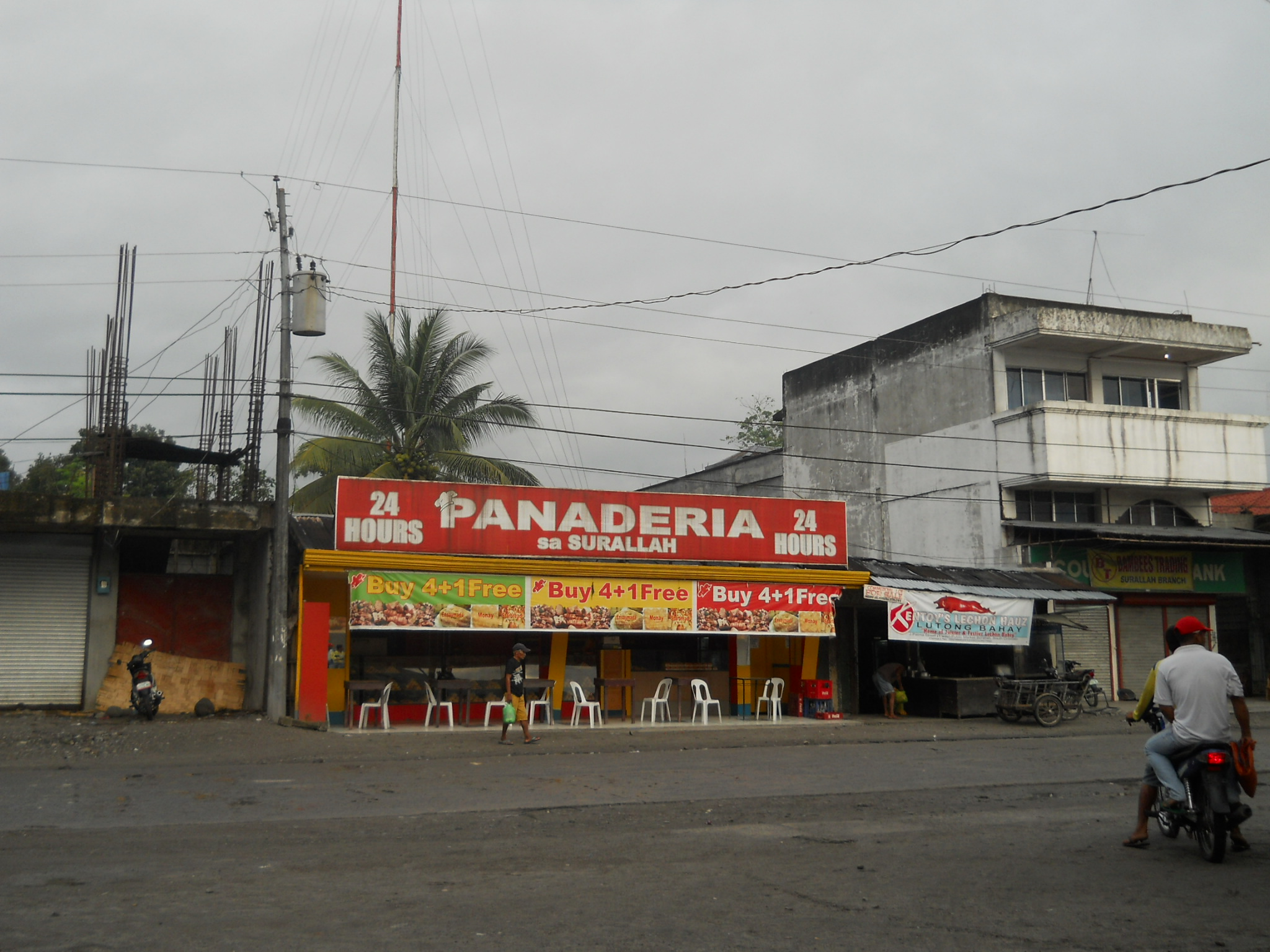
Businesses in Surallah

Poverty incidence of Surallah (%)

Source: Philippine Statistics Authority

As economic activities flourished in the area, more people especially businessmen settled into the place, which contributed to a faster pace of development. ts functional role is an Alternate Provincial Agro-industrial Center. While being a major producer of corn and rice, Surallah has explored its vast potential for progress.

Recognized as the champion-advocate of the Clean and Green Program, Surallah is the development of the municipality and its people. The USWAG Surallah Program, a multi-sectoral approach to addressing the main thrust of its people, has put Surallah forward as an agri-industrial zone in the province of South Cotabato.

Agriculture is the major economy of Surallah, but multinational companies like Dole Philippines has constructed a plant in the municipality. Also, major economic boom in the municipality was due to its location. Surallah is in the center of many National Road thus, many businessmen settled here because it is in the center of some municipalities. It is the Economical Center of the Upper Valley Area, which is composed of all the municipalities of Tboli, Lake Sebu, Banga, Norala, Santo Nino and Surallah. Together they function like a metropolitan area with Surallah as its Central Business District.

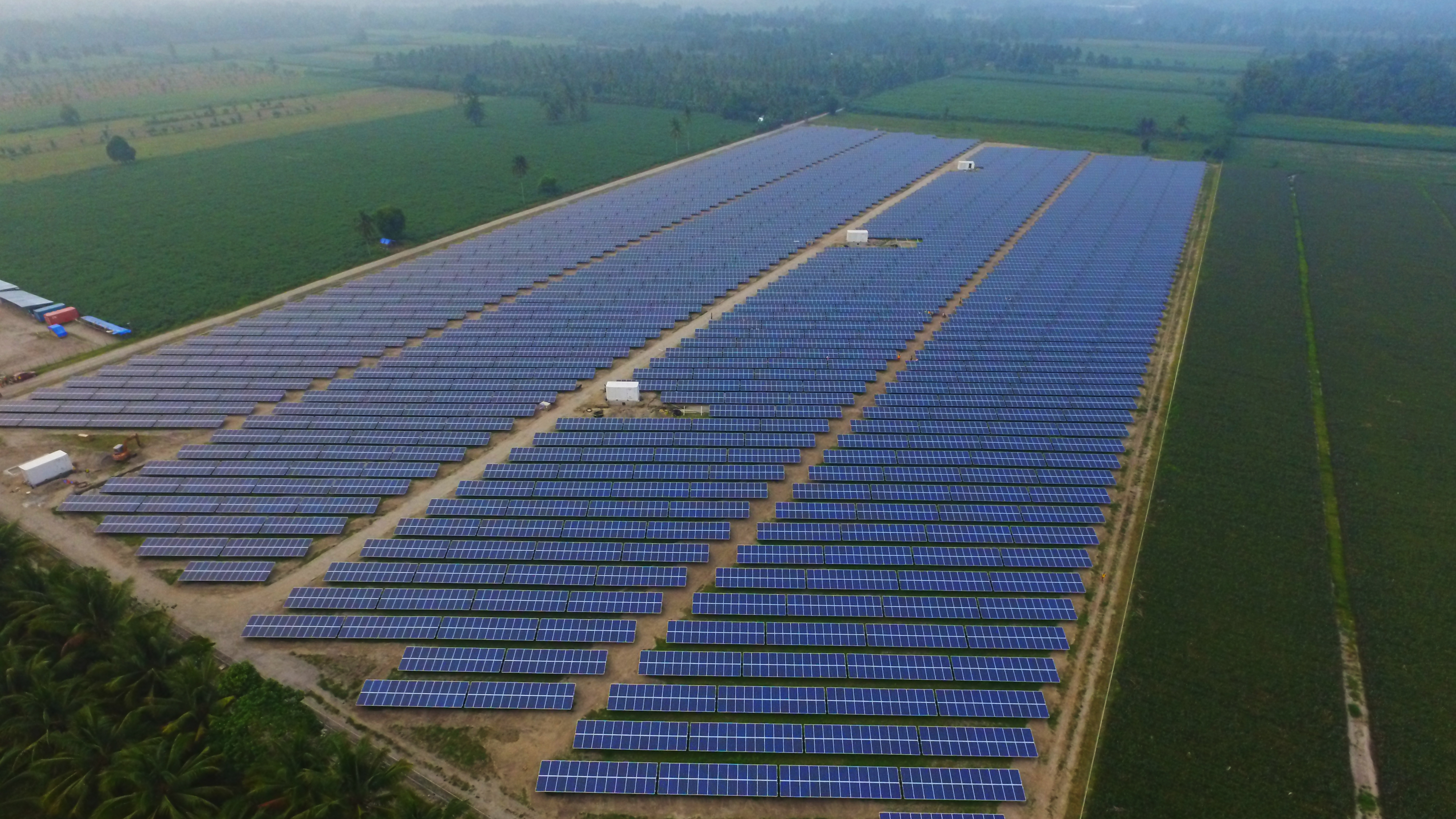
Photovoltaic Power Plant located in Barangay Centrala is the largest in the Philippines.

=== Income classification ===
Surallah has an average income of PhP 147,499,170.72 as of 2010, certified by the Commission on Audit. According to the Philippine income classification for provinces (cities and municipalities), Surallah is a 1st class municipality.

== Transportation ==
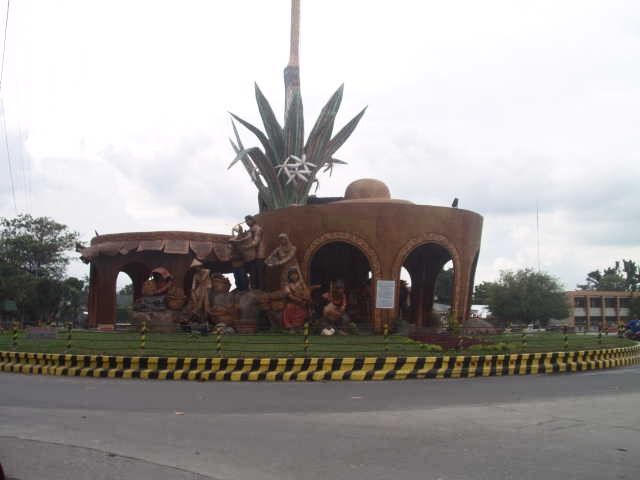
The Surallah RoundBall-Landmark in a middle of a roundabout

By land

The Surallah Integrated Public Terminal (SIPT) has trips every 30 minutes every day to Tboli, Lake Sebu and Koronadal (6:00am–7:00pm) 4x daily trip to General Santos and for bus, there is a trip to Koronadal City every 30 minutes (6:00am–7:00pm) daily and 6x a day trip to Tacurong City with a stop to Isulan.

By air

Allah Valley Airport serves the general area of Surallah. It is located in the Allah Valley. The airport is classified by the Air Transportation Office as a secondary airport, or a minor commercial domestic airport. Today, there are no commercial flights in this airport because of its obsolete facilities and Cotabato and General Santos are handling commercial flights

== Healthcare ==
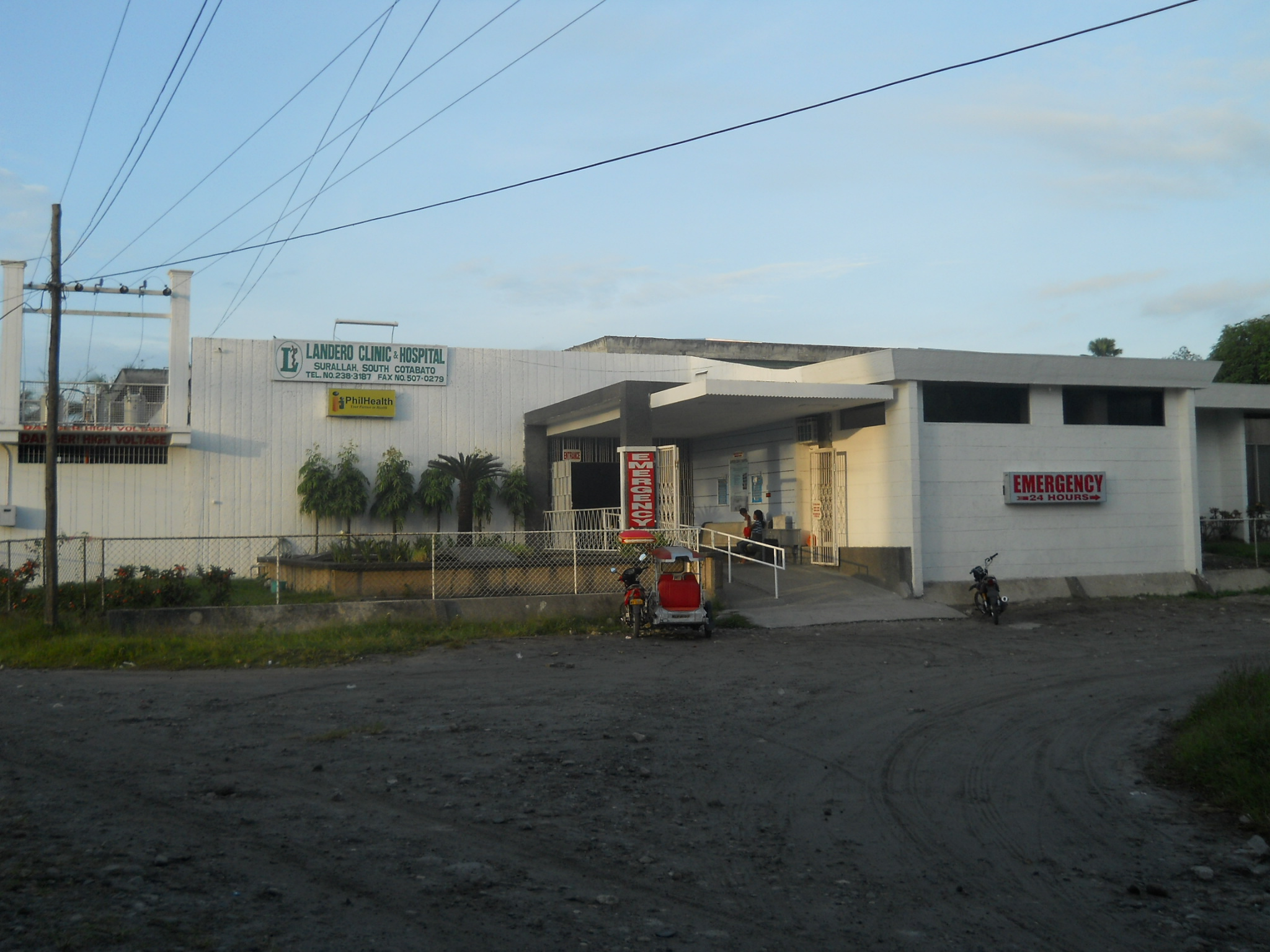
Landero Clinic and Hospital

- Landero Clinic and Hospital
- Lariosa Clinic and Hospital
- Surallah Community Hospital
- Upper Valley Community Hospital
- Maghari Medical Clinic

== Education ==
Tertiary Level:

- Holy Child College of Information Technology
- South Cotabato State College

Secondary Level:

Private Secondary Schools:

- Notre Dame of Surala, Inc.

- Allah Valley Academy

- Thelsan School, Inc.

- Holy Child College of Information Technology

Public Secondary Schools:

- Libertad National High School

- Surallah National High School

- Centrala National High School

- Lamsugod National High School

- Lamian National High School

- Lambontong National High School

- Colongulo National High School

- Naci Integrated School

- Laureano Escovidal Integrated School

Talahik Integrated School

Elementary Level:

Public Elementary Schools:

- Surallah Central Elementary School

- Surallah East Elementary School

- Centrala Central Elementary School

- Shri Visaya Elementary School

- Mabini Elementary School

- Lamian Central Elementary School

- Lamsogod Elementary School

- Lambontong Elementary School

- Valeriana L. Barber Elementary School

- Veterans Elementary School

- Romeo R. Monsale Elementary School

Private Elementary Schools:

- Notre Dame of Surala, Inc.

- Thelsan School, Inc.

- Allah Valley Academy

- Holy Child College of Information Technology
