= T'Boli, South Cotabato =

Municipality in South Cotabato, Philippines

T'Boli
- Municipality
- Municipality of T'Boli
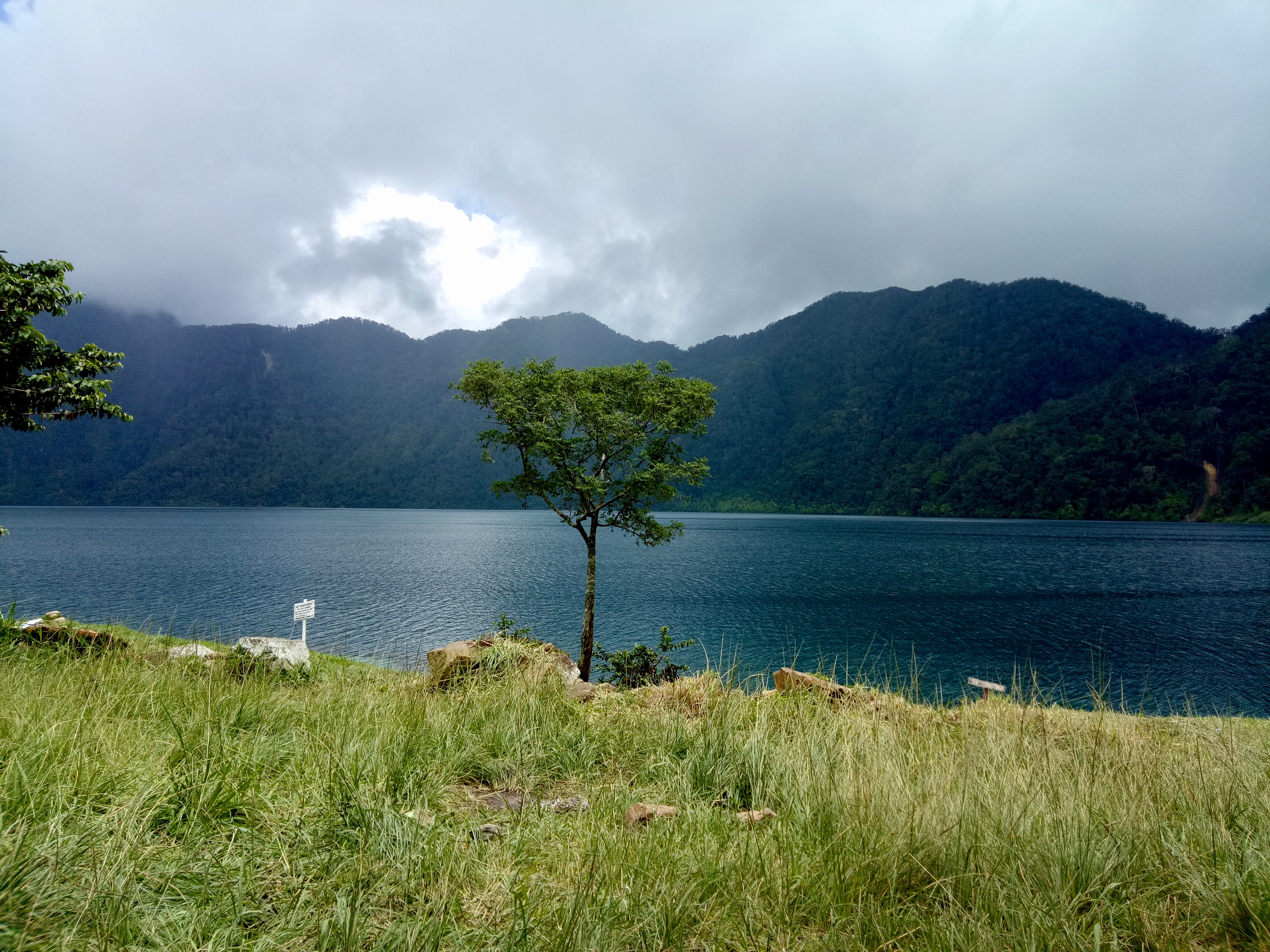
- Lake Holon in the Municipality of Tboli

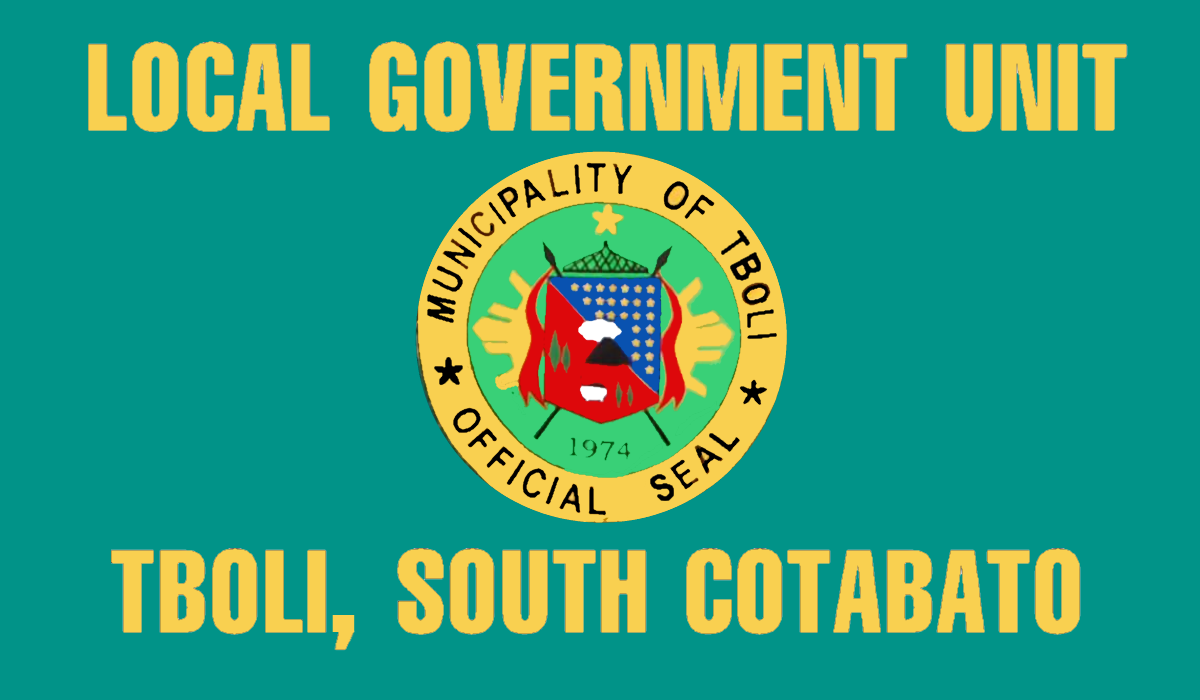
- Flag Seal

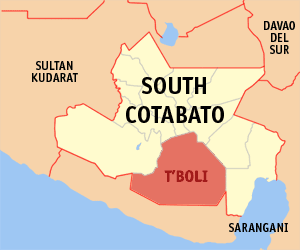
- Map of South Cotabato with T'Boli highlighted
- Interactive map of T'Boli
- Location within the Philippines
- Coordinates: 6°12′56″N 124°49′22″E
- Country: Philippines
- Region: Soccsksargen
- Province: South Cotabato
- District: 2nd district
- Barangays: 25 (see Barangays)

Government
  - Type: Sangguniang Bayan
  - Mayor: Keo Dayle T. Tuan
  - Vice Mayor: Ronie L. Dela Peña
  - Representative: Peter B. Miguel
  - Municipal Council: Members: Kirk T. Tuan; Pacifico C. Cordada Jr.; Falin Q. Kuta; Valerio J. Fado; Elsa M. Kayawan; Gading A. Kamblan; Swain C. Atam-de Groot; Mansueto L. dela Peña Jr.
  - Electorate: 59,837 voters (2025)

Area
  - Total: 895.83 km^{2} (345.88 sq mi)
- Elevation: 572 m (1,877 ft)
- Highest elevation: 1,151 m (3,776 ft)
- Lowest elevation: 337 m (1,106 ft)

Population (2024 census)
  - Total: 105,296
  - Density: 117.54/km^{2} (304.43/sq mi)
  - Households: 23,993
- Demonym: Tboli

Economy
  - Income class: 1st municipal income class
  - Poverty incidence: 32.2% (2023)
  - Revenue: ₱ 552.6 million (2024)
  - Assets: ₱ 869.6 million (2024)
  - Expenditure: ₱ 475.2 million (2024)
  - Liabilities: ₱ 291.3 million (2024)

Service provider
  - Electricity: South Cotabato 1 Electric Cooperative (SOCOTECO 1)
- Time zone: UTC+8 (PST)
- ZIP code: 9513
- PSGC: 1206316000
- IDD : area code: +63 (0)83
- Native languages: Tboli; Hiligaynon; Cotabato Manobo; Cebuano; Tagalog
- Website: central.tboliscot.gov.ph

Tboli, officially the Municipality of Tboli (Hiligaynon: Banwa sang Tboli; Cebuano: Lungsod sa Tboli; Tagalog: Bayan ng Tboli), is a municipality in the province of South Cotabato, Philippines. According to the 2024 census, it has a population of 105,296 people. The town is named after the indigenous natives themselves, the Tboli people.

Located in the town is Lake Holon within Mount Parker. The lake was declared as the cleanest inland body of water in the entire country in 2003 and 2004.

== History ==
T'Boli was officially created on March 5, 1974, through Presidential Decree No. 407, signed by President Ferdinand E. Marcos.

== Geography ==
=== Barangays ===
Tboli is politically subdivided into 25 barangays. Each barangay consists of puroks while some have sitios.

- Aflek
- Afus
- Basag
- Datal Bob
- Desawo
- Datal Dlanag
- Edwards (Poblacion)
- Kematu
- Laconon
- Lambangan
- Lambuling
- Lamhako
- Lamsalome
- Lemsnolon
- Maan
- Malugong
- Mongocayo
- New Dumangas
- Poblacion
- Salacafe
- Sinolon
- Talcon
- Talufo
- T'bolok
- Tudok

=== Climate ===
Climate data for Tboli, South Cotabato
Month	Jan	Feb	Mar	Apr	May	Jun	Jul	Aug	Sep	Oct	Nov	Dec	Year
Mean daily maximum °C (°F)	27 (81)	28 (82)	28 (82)	28 (82)	27 (81)	26 (79)	26 (79)	26 (79)	26 (79)	26 (79)	26 (79)	27 (81)	27 (80)
Mean daily minimum °C (°F)	20 (68)	20 (68)	20 (68)	21 (70)	22 (72)	21 (70)	21 (70)	21 (70)	21 (70)	21 (70)	21 (70)	21 (70)	21 (70)
Average precipitation mm (inches)	146 (5.7)	121 (4.8)	164 (6.5)	212 (8.3)	347 (13.7)	397 (15.6)	364 (14.3)	366 (14.4)	302 (11.9)	308 (12.1)	280 (11.0)	192 (7.6)	3,199 (125.9)
Average rainy days	16.7	15.5	19.4	22.7	29.0	28.9	27.9	27.5	26.5	28.1	27.2	22.6	292
Source: Meteoblue

== Demographics ==
Population census of T'Boli
Year	Pop.	±% p.a.
1975	32,602	—
1980	39,412	+3.87%
1990	32,373	−1.95%
1995	54,206	+10.14%
2000	60,693	+2.45%
2007	70,609	+2.11%
2010	79,175	+4.25%
2015	91,453	+2.78%
2020	101,049	+2.12%
2024	105,296	+0.99%
Source: Philippine Statistics Authority

== Economy ==
Poverty incidence of T'Boli (%)

Source: Philippine Statistics Authority
