= List of radio stations in Soccsksargen =

Radio stations in the Philippines

The following is a list of NTC-licensed radio stations in Soccsksargen, a region of the Philippines,

== Cotabato ==
=== AM stations ===
Frequency	Name	Company	Format	Call Sign	Power	Location Covered
747 AM	Radyo Bida Kidapawan	Notre Dame Broadcasting Corporation	News, Public Affairs, Talk	DXND	10 kW	Kidapawan
1089 AM	DXCM Radyo Ukay Kidapawan	UM Broadcasting Network	News, Public Affairs, Talk	DXCM	10 kW	Kidapawan

=== FM stations ===
Frequency	Name	Company	Format	Call Sign	Power	Location Covered
87.7 FM	Juander Radyo Kidapawan	Malindang Broadcasting Network Corporation (operated by RSV Broadcasting Network)	Contemporary MOR, News, Talk	DXSD	5 kW	Kidapawan
87.9 FM	Shine Radio	—N/a	Contemporary MOR, News, Talk	DXEE	5 kW	Midsayap
88.7 FM	Happy FM Kidapawan	Notre Dame Broadcasting Corporation	Contemporary MOR, OPM	DXDM	5 kW	Kidapawan
88.9 FM	T Radio Makilala	ELT ADZ Communication Services	Soft AC, News, Talk	DXAS	5 kW	Makilala
89.7 FM	Dear FM Kabacan	—N/a	Contemporary MOR, Talk	DXGQ	5 kW	Kabacan
90.3 FM	Charm Radio Kidapawan	Polytechnic Foundation of Cotabato and Asia	Contemporary MOR, News, Talk	DXCH	5 kW	Kidapawan
90.7 FM	Max FM Tulunan	Rizal Memorial Colleges Broadcasting Corporation (operated by Christian Media Management)	Contemporary MOR, News, Talk	DXYO	5 kW	Tulunan
91.1 FM	XFM Kidapawan	Yes2Health Broadcasting Network	Contemporary MOR, News, Talk	—N/a	5 kW	Kidapawan
91.5 FM	Power Radio M'lang	—N/a	Contemporary MOR, Talk	DXBQ	5 kW	M'lang
91.9 FM	Nice FM	PEC Broadcasting Corporation	Contemporary MOR, Talk	DXPE	5 kW	Kidapawan
92.9 FM	DXCM Radyo Ukay Kidapawan	UM Broadcasting Network	News, Public Affairs, Talk	DXAZ	5 kW	Kidapawan
93.3 FM	Charm Radio Arakan	Polytechnic Foundation of Cotabato and Asia	Contemporary MOR, News, Talk	DXAG	5 kW	Arakan
94.1 FM	GNN FM	Kalayaan Broadcasting System	Community radio	DXKW	5 kW	Tulunan
94.3 FM	Power Radio	Hypersonic Broadcasting Center	Contemporary MOR, Talk	DXJA	5 kW	Midsayap
94.5 FM	Radyo Sincero Kidapawan	Herbz Med Pharma Corporation	Contemporary MOR, News, Talk	DXHO	5 kW	Kidapawan
94.7 FM	Power Radio Makilala	Rizal Memorial Colleges Broadcasting Corporation	Contemporary MOR, Talk	DXHQ	5 kW	Makilala
94.9 FM	Kool FM Kabacan	University of Southern Mindanao	Contemporary MOR, Talk	DXVL	1 kW	Kabacan
96.7 FM	Radyo Bandera News FM Kidapawan	Palawan Broadcasting Corporation (5K Broadcasting Network)	Contemporary MOR, News, Talk	DXFR	5 kW	Kidapawan
97.5 FM	Brigada News FM Kidapawan	Brigada Mass Media Corporation (Baycomms Broadcasting Corporation)	Contemporary MOR, News, Talk	DXZC	5 kW	Kidapawan
97.9 FM	Sugar Radio	—N/a	Contemporary MOR, OPM	DXAK	5 kW	Kidapawan
98.1 FM	Radyo Kaibigan Banisilan	—N/a	Contemporary MOR, OPM, News	DXRK	5 kW	Banisilan
98.1 FM	Radyo Amigo Pigcawayan	—N/a	Contemporary MOR, OPM	DXPC	5 kW	Pigcawayan
98.5 FM	Sky Radio M'lang	Kalayaan Broadcasting System	Contemporary MOR, News, Talk	DXCQ	5 kW	M'lang
98.9 FM	Kings Radio Midsayap	KAMM Media Network	Contemporary MOR, News, Talk	DXGQ	5 kW	Midsayap
99.1 FM	Energy FM Kidapawan	Ultrasonic Broadcasting System	Contemporary MOR, OPM	DXUB	5 kW	Kidapawan
99.9 FM	AWR Hope Radio Kidapawan	Digital Broadcasting Corporation (Adventist Media)	Religious radio (Seventh-day Adventist)	DXVR	5 kW	Kidapawan
99.9 FM	Radyo Kasadya	National Nutrition Council (Nutriskwela Community Radio (operated by the Municipal Government of President Roxas)	Community radio	DXNF	5 kW	President Roxas
100.5 FM	Radyo Bandera Midsayap	Palawan Broadcasting Corporation (Bandera News Philippines) (operated by Far East Broadcasting Network Corporation)	Contemporary MOR, News, Talk	DXFU	5 kW	Midsayap
100.7 FM	Infinite Radio Kidapawan	St. Jude Thaddeus Institute of Technology (operated by Far East Broadcasting Network Corporation)	Contemporary MOR, News, Talk	DXSY	5 kW	Kidapawan
100.9 FM	Infinite Radio Alamada	St. Jude Thaddeus Institute of Technology	Contemporary MOR, News, Talk	DXNB	5 kW	Alamada
101.1 FM	T Radio Midsayap	ELT ADZ Communication Services	Soft AC, News, Talk	DXAY	5 kW	Midsayap
101.5 FM	Edge Radio Kidapawan	Christian Music Power Inc.	Gospel, Talk	DXCD	5 kW	Kidapawan
102.3 FM	Joy FM Kidapawan	Kalayaan Broadcasting System (operated by YAKI Broadcasting Corporation)	Contemporary MOR, Talk	DXKF	5 kW	Kidapawan
103.1 FM	Dream FM Kidapawan	DepEd Kidapawan	Contemporary MOR, News, Talk	DXGO	5 kW	Kidapawan
103.3 FM	Max FM Midsayap	Rizal Memorial Colleges Broadcasting Corporation	Contemporary MOR, News, Talk	DXDN	5 kW	Midsayap
103.7 FM	Grace FM		Contemporary MOR, News, Talk	DXAQ	5 kW	Matalam
104.1 FM	Wow Radio	Polytechnic Foundation of Cotabato and Asia	Contemporary MOR, News, Talk	DXMA	5 kW	Midsayap
104.7 FM	Prime FM Kidapawan	Prime Broadcasting Network	Contemporary MOR, News, Talk	DXEI	5 kW	Kidapawan
106.1 FM	Ronda FM	—N/a	Contemporary MOR, News, Talk	DXTR	5 kW	Kidapawan
107.1 FM	Radyo Natin Kidapawan	MBC Media Group	Community radio	DXYY	5 kW	Kidapawan
107.9 FM	Nonglading Radio	Rizal Memorial Colleges Broadcasting Corporation (operated by Nonglading Broadcasting Services)	Contemporary MOR, News, Talk	DXKM	5 kW	Kidapawan

== South Cotabato ==
=== AM stations ===
Frequency	Name	Company	Format	Call Sign	Power	Location Covered
531 AM	DZRH General Santos (relay from Manila)	MBC Media Group	Drama, News, Public Affairs, Talk	DXGH	10 kW	General Santos
585 AM	Radyo Totoo General Santos	South Cotabato Communications Corporation (a member of the Catholic Media Network)	News, Public Affairs, Catholic radio, Talk	DXCP	10 kW	General Santos
639 AM	RMN Koronadal	Radio Mindanao Network	Drama, News, Public Affairs, Talk	DXKR	3 kW	Koronadal
693 AM	Radyo Ronda General Santos	Radio Philippines Network	News, Public Affairs, Talk	DXDX	10 kW	General Santos
765 AM	Radyo Pilipino General Santos	Radio Audience Developers Integrated Organization, Inc. (Radyo Pilipino Media Group)	News, Public Affairs, Talk	DXGS	10 kW	General Santos
801 AM	Bombo Radyo General Santos	People's Broadcasting Service (Bombo Radyo Philippines)	Drama, News, Public Affairs, Talk	DXES	10 kW	General Santos
927 AM	RMN General Santos	Radio Mindanao Network	Drama, News, Public Affairs, Talk	DXMD	10 kW	General Santos
963 AM	Radyo Bida Koronadal	Notre Dame Broadcasting Corporation	News, Public Affairs, Talk	DXOM	5 kW	Koronadal
1026 AM	Bombo Radyo Koronadal	People's Broadcasting Service (Bombo Radyo Philippines)	Drama, News, Public Affairs, Talk	DXMC	5 kW	Koronadal
1062 AM	DXKI	Far East Broadcasting Company	News, Public Affairs, Religion, Talk	DXKI	10 kW	Koronadal

=== FM stations ===
Frequency	Name	Company	Format	Call Sign	Power	Location Covered
87.9 FM	Juander Radyo General Santos	Malindang Broadcasting Network Corporation (operated by RSV Broadcasting Network)	Contemporary MOR, News, Radio	DXLQ	10 kW	General Santos
88.1 FM	T Radio Surallah	ELT ADZ Communication Services	Soft AC, News, Talk	DXUW	5 kW	Surallah
89.5 FM	Brigada News FM General Santos	Baycomms Broadcasting Corporation (Brigada Mass Media Corporation)	Contemporary MOR, News, Talk	DXYM	10 kW	General Santos
89.7 FM	Prime FM Surallah	Prime Broadcasting Network	Contemporary MOR, News, Talk	DXPD	5 kW	Surallah
89.7 FM	AWR Mavia Radio	Digital Broadcasting Corporation (Adventist Media)	Religious Radio (Seventh-day Adventist)	DXAW	5 kW	Tupi
90.1 FM	Max FM Koronadal	Rizal Memorial Colleges Broadcasting Corporation (operated by Christian Media Management)	Contemporary MOR, News, Talk	DXKL	5 kW	Koronadal
90.3 FM	The Heartbeat of GenSan	Sarraga Integrated and Management Corporation, operated by Holy Trinity College	Campus radio	DXAH	10 kW	General Santos
90.5 FM	Good Vibes Radio	Iddes Broadcast Group	Contemporary MOR, News, Talk	DXRS	5 kW	Koronadal
90.9 FM	The Voice of Lake Sebu	—N/a	Contemporary MOR, Talk	DXLS	5 kW	Lake Sebu
91.1 FM	Pacman Radio	JMP Mass Media Production	Contemporary MOR, News, Talk	DXEP	10 kW	General Santos
91.7 FM	Happy FM Koronadal	Notre Dame Broadcasting Corporation	Contemporary MOR, Original Pilipino Music	DXOM	5 kW	Koronadal
91.9 FM	iFM News General Santos	Radio Mindanao Network	Contemporary MOR, News, Talk	DXCK	10 kW	General Santos
92.5 FM	Radyo Sincero GenSan	Audiovisual Communicators Inc. (operated by Herbz Med Pharma Corporation)	Contemporary MOR, News, Talk	DXEZ	5 kW	General Santos
92.5 FM	Radyo Rapido Koronadal	Sarraga Integrated and Management Corporation	Contemporary MOR, News, Talk	DXKG	5 kW	Koronadal
93.1 FM	Tambayan News FM	SKIA Broadcasting Center	Contemporary MOR, News, Talk	DXAE	5 kW	Tupi
93.1 FM	Tri-Media News FM	Tri-Media Association of General Santos City-South Cotabato, Inc.	Contemporary MOR, News, Talk	DXTM	10 kW	General Santos
93.5 FM	Parekoy Radio	—N/a	Contemporary MOR, News, Talk	DXER	5 kW	Polomolok
93.7 FM	Max FM Surallah	Christian Media Management	Contemporary MOR, News, Talk	DXYG	5 kW	Surallah
93.9 FM	Marvelous FM	Marvelous College	Contemporary MOR, News, Talk	DXMU	5 kW	Koronadal
94.3 FM	DZRH News FM	Cebu Broadcasting Company (MBC Media Group)	Soft AC, News, Talk	DXTS	10 kW	General Santos
94.7 FM	Banat Radyo	—N/a	Contemporary MOR, News, Talk	DXSH	5 kW	Surallah
95.3 FM	AWR Southern Mindanao	Digital Broadcasting Corporation (Adventist Media)	Religious Radio (Seventh-day Adventist)	DXIC	10 kW	General Santos
95.3 FM	AWR Tampakan	Digital Broadcasting Corporation (Adventist Media)	Religious Radio (Seventh-day Adventist)	DXTA	5 kW	Tampakan
95.7 FM	Brigada News FM Koronadal	Baycomms Broadcasting Corporation (Brigada Mass Media Corporation)	Contemporary MOR, News, Talk	DXCE	10 kW	Koronadal
95.9 FM	XFM General Santos	Rizal Memorial Colleges Broadcasting Corporation (operated by Y2H Broadcasting Network Inc.)	Contemporary MOR, News, Talk	DXPF	5 kW	General Santos
96.7 FM	Infinite Radio General Santos	St. Jude Thaddeus Institute of Technology (operated by ALAMCCO Radio Broadcasting Station)	Contemporary MOR, News, Talk	DXRG	5 kW	General Santos
96.9 FM	Energy FM Radyo Astig	Ultrasonic Broadcasting System Inc.	Contemporary MOR, News, Talk	DXUK	5 kW	Koronadal
97.5 FM	FMR General Santos	Philippine Collective Media Corporation	Contemporary MOR, OPM	DXOO	5 kW	General Santos
97.9 FM	Spring Radio Tampakan	—N/a	Contemporary MOR, Talk	DXCF	5 kW	Tampakan
98.1 FM	Radyo Bandera News FM Surallah	Kaissar Broadcasting Network, operated by Bandera News Philippines	Contemporary MOR, News, Talk	DXSX	5 kW	Surallah
98.3 FM	Home Radio General Santos	Aliw Broadcasting Corporation	Soft AC	DXQS	10 kW	General Santos
98.7 FM	Ani at Kita Teleradyo	Department of Agriculture	Community radio, Talk, Music	DXKT	5 kW	Koronadal
98.9 FM	AWR Lake Sebu	Digital Broadcasting Corporation (Adventist Media)	Religious Radio (Seventh-day Adventist)	DXNA	5 kW	Lake Sebu
99.1 FM	Wild FM General Santos	UM Broadcasting Network	Contemporary MOR, Original Pilipino Music	DXRT	10 kW	General Santos
99.3 FM	Radyo Kahiusa	National Nutrition Council (Nutriskwela Community Radio), operated by the Municipal Government of Tupi	Community Radio	DXNM	0.5 kW	Tupi
99.5 FM	Bondingan FM	—N/a	Contemporary MOR, Talk	DXJE	5 kW	Polomolok
99.7 FM	Esmael Radio Banga	Amapola Broadcasting System	Soft AC, News, Talk	DXBW	5 kW	Banga
100.1 FM	Love Radio Koronadal	MBC Media Group	Contemporary MOR, Original Pilipino Music	DXME	5 kW	Koronadal
100.9 FM	Favorite Radio Koronadal	Kalayaan Broadcasting System (operated by OPB Mass Media Broadcasting Company)	Contemporary MOR, News, Talk	DXOB	5 kW	Koronadal
100.9 FM	Radyo Natin Tupi	MBC Media Group	Contemporary MOR, News, Talk	DXCF	5 kW	Tupi
101.5 FM	Love Radio General Santos	MBC Media Group	Contemporary MOR, Original Pilipino Music	DXWK	10 kW	General Santos
102.3 FM	Barangay FM Super Radyo General Santos	GMA Network, Inc.	Contemporary MOR, News, Talk	DXCJ	10 kW	General Santos
102.9 FM	Radyo Sincero Koronadal	St. Jude Thaddeus Institute of Technology	Contemporary MOR, News, Talk	DXGW	5 kW	Koronadal
103.1 FM	Radyo Bandera News FM General Santos	Palawan Broadcasting Corporation (Bandera News Philippines)	Contemporary MOR, News, Talk	DXFQ	10 kW	General Santos
103.3 FM	Radyo Katribu	National Nutrition Council (Nutriskwela Community Radio), operated by the Municipal Government of T'Boli	Community Radio	DXNR	0.5 kW	T'Boli
103.9 FM	GFM One Life Radio	Kalayaan Broadcasting System	Religious Radio	DXLK	10 kW	General Santos
104.7 FM	Solid FM General Santos	Y2H Broadcasting Network Inc.	Soft AC	DXKP	10 kW	General Santos
104.9 FM	Radyo Kaibigan Surallah	—N/a	Contemporary MOR, News, Talk	DXRK	5 kW	Surallah
105.1 FM	Mega News FM	—N/a	Contemporary MOR, News, Talk	DXMY	5 kW	Polomolok
105.5 FM	The Anchor Radio General Santos	—N/a	Gospel, Talk	DXHB	5 kW	General Santos
105.9 FM	The Anchor Radio Tupi	—N/a	Gospel, Talk	DXTA	5 kW	Tupi
106.5 FM	TopGun Radio	Rizal Memorial Colleges Broadcasting Corporation	Contemporary MOR, News, Talk	DXQK	5 kW	Koronadal
106.7 FM	Rich Good News FM	United Pentecostal Church	Gospel, Talk	DWRC	5 kW	General Santos
107.1 FM	Max FM General Santos	Rizal Memorial Colleges Broadcasting Corporation (operated by Christian Media Management)	Contemporary MOR, News, Talk	DXCI	10 kW	General Santos
107.3 FM	Radyo Latigo	Subic Broadcasting Corporation	Contemporary MOR, News, Talk	DXSU	5 kW	Koronadal

== Sultan Kudarat ==
=== FM stations ===
Frequency	Name	Company	Format	Call Sign	Power	Location Covered
87.5 FM	Charm Radio Tacurong	Polytechnic Foundation of Cotabato and Asia	Contemporary MOR, News, Talk	DXPF	5 kW	Tacurong
88.1 FM	Radyo Kidlat SUKELCO	Presidential Broadcast Service	Contemporary MOR, News, Talk	DXQD	5 kW	Tacurong
88.3 FM	Arangkada Pilipino	—N/a	Contemporary MOR, News, Talk	DXGD	5 kW	Tacurong
88.9 FM	Double A FM	—N/a	Contemporary MOR, News, Talk	DXAA	5 kW	Columbio
88.9 FM	Juander Radyo Tacurong	Rizal Memorial Colleges Broadcasting Corporation (operated by RSV Broadcasting Network)	Contemporary MOR, News, Talk	DXCX	5 kW	Tacurong
89.7 FM	Prime FM Lebak	Prime Broadcasting Network	Contemporary MOR, News, Talk	DXHM	5 kW	Lebak
90.7 FM	Max FM Lebak	Rizal Memorial Colleges Broadcasting Corporation (operated by Christian Media Management)	Contemporary MOR, News, Talk	DXLB	5 kW	Lebak
91.3 FM	Brigada News FM Lebak	Baycomms Broadcasting Corporation (Brigada Mass Media Corporation)	Contemporary MOR, News, Talk	DXBI	5 kW	Lebak
92.1 FM	Radyo Kadulangan	National Nutrition Council (Nutriskwela Community Radio), operated by the Municipal Government of Kalamansig	Community radio	DXAO	5 kW	Kalamansig
93.3 FM	Infinite Radio Isulan	St. Jude Thaddeus Institute of Technology (operated by Far East Broadcasting Network Corporation)	Contemporary MOR, News, Talk	DXSJ	5 kW	Isulan
94.5 FM	Radyo Natin Tacurong	MBC Media Group	Community radio	DXRB	5 kW	Tacurong
96.5 FM	Prime FM Tacurong	Prime Broadcasting Network	Contemporary MOR, News, Talk	DXRX	5 kW	Tacurong
97.3 FM	Radyo Bandera Tacurong	Palawan Broadcasting Corporation (Bandera News Philippines) (operated by Far East Broadcasting Network Corporation)	Contemporary MOR, News, Talk	DXYC	5 kW	Tacurong
98.9 FM	Radyo Katilingban	National Nutrition Council (Nutriskwela Community Radio), operated by the City Government of Tacurong	Community radio	DXNP	5 kW	Tacurong
99.3 FM	T Radio Tacurong	ELT ADZ Communication Services	Soft AC, News, Talk	DXPP	5 kW	Tacurong
101.3 FM	Radyo Natin Isulan	MBC Media Group	Community radio	DXSD	5 kW	Isulan
105.1 FM	Radyo Natin Lebak	MBC Media Group	Community radio, Music	DXLR	3 kW	Lebak

== Sarangani Province ==
=== FM stations ===
Frequency	Name	Company	Format	Call Sign	Power	Location Covered
88.1 FM	K5 News FM Sarangani	Palawan Broadcasting Corporation (Bandera News Philippines)	Contemporary MOR, News, Talk	DXTY	5 kW	Glan, Sarangani
95.5 FM	Radyo Probinsyano	—N/a	Contemporary MOR, News, Talk	DXDC	5 kW	Kiamba, Sarangani
99.7 FM	Radyo Kasaganaan	National Nutrition Council (Nutriskwela Community Radio), operated by the Municipal Government of Maitum	Community Radio	DXNI	0.5 kW	Maitum, Sarangani
100.1 FM	Radyo Probinsyano	—N/a	Contemporary MOR, News, Talk	DXPY	5 kW	Maitum, Sarangani
100.5 FM	Muews Radio Kiamba	Sagay Broadcasting Corporation	Contemporary MOR, News, Talk	DXXG	5 kW	Kiamba, Sarangani
101.3 FM	Radyo Natin Kiamba	MBC Media Group	Contemporary MOR, News, Talk	DXSG	5 kW	Kiamba
101.7 FM	Radyo Natin Maasim	MBC Media Group	Contemporary MOR, News, Talk	DXSH	5 kW	Maasim
