= Max FM (disambiguation) =

Max FM may also refer to:

- Max FM; two music radio stations, in Lagos, Nigeria and Abuja, Nigeria
- MAX FM, KMAX-FM, Wellington, Colorado, United States
- 2MAX, Max FM, Narrabri, New South Wales, Australia
- CFQM-FM, 103.9 Max FM, Moncton, New Brunswick, Canada
- CHER-FM, Max 98.3 FM, Sydney, Nova Scotia, Canada
- CHGB-FM, 97.7 Max FM, Wasaga Beach, Ontario, Canada
- CISO-FM, 89.1 Max FM, Orilla, Ontario, Canada
- CKOD-FM, 103.1 Max FM, Salaberry-de-Valleyfield, Quebec, Canada
- DXCI, 107.1 Max FM, General Santos, South Cotabato, Philippines
- DXDN-FM, 103.3 Max FM, Midsayap, Cotabato, Philippines
- DXJC, 99.1 Max FM, Digos, Davao del Sur, Philippines
- DXLL-FM, 94.7 Max FM, Davao City, Davao del Sur, Philippines
- KERX, 95.3 Max FM, Paris, Arkansas, United States
- Max 107.3, Mid North Coast, New South Wales, Australia
- WMAX-FM, Holland, Michigan, United States
- WRPQ, 99.7 Max FM, Baraboo, Wisconsin, United States
- WYMR (FM), MAX 98.3 FM, Culver, Indiana, United States

== Former stations ==
- CJSP-FM, 92.7 Max-FM (2011–2012), Leamington, Ontario, Canada
- DWKX, 103.5 Max FM (2005–2010), Mandaluyong, Philippines
- KGMZ-FM, Max FM (2005–2007), San Francisco, California, United States
- KLKC-FM, Max FM, Parsons, Kansas, United States
- KLRX, MAX-FM (2005–2007), Lee's Summit, Missouri, United States
- KMAX-FM, MAX-FM (2002–2012), Wellington, Colorado, United States
- KMXN, KKYD, 92.9 Max FM (2005–2006), Osage City, Kansas, United States
- KPSL-FM, KVMX, 96-5 Max-FM (2008–2011), Bakersfield, California, United States
- KQKZ, KVMX, The 92-1 Max FM (2011–2013), Bakersfield, California, United States
- WAOL, Max FM (1993–2013), Ripley, Ohio, United States
- WKCA, Max FM (2005–2007), Morehead, Kentucky, United States
- WKZF, WDQX, Max FM (2005–2013), Morton, Illinois, United States
- WOXY 97.7 FM, Max FM (2004–2010), Oxford / Mason, Ohio, United States
- WVBW-FM, WXMM, 100.5 MAX-FM (2003–2005), Norfolk, Virginia, United States
- XHPRS-FM, Max FM (2014–2019), Tecate, Baja California, Mexico
- XHMRL-FM, Max FM, Morelia, Michoacán, Mexico
