= Winnie Yu =

Hong Kong radio personality

Winnie Yu Tsang (Chinese: 俞琤; pinyin: Yú Chēng, born 1954) is a Hong Kong radio personality and was the deputy chairman of Commercial Radio Hong Kong from 2004 through 2015.

Yu is known for her puns in creating radio programme titles and slang phrases (e.g., si-dan-up/"是但噏", literally "freestyle talk", as a phonetic translation of "stand-up").

Over the years, Yu has mentored many musicians and DJs, including Tat Ming Pair and Jan Lamb.

== Early life and career ==
Yu grew up at Mid-Levels on Hong Kong Island, with her parents, sister and brother. She attended St. Stephen's Girls' College, a Christian all-girls school (kindergarten through high school). She wrote and produced many controversial plays in the strict environment of the religious school.

Yu left secondary school in 1971, when she was only in Fifth Form. She joined Hong Kong Commercial Radio (CR) as a DJ and first hosted a breakfast radio programme titled Morning Friends (早晨老友記). She was subsequently given the role of creative director and then programme director of the newly formed youth radio channel CR2.

In 1982, Yu left CR to form her own production company, Mes Amis Productions, and was involved in a range of media projects, including movie production.

She was invited to return to CR in 1988 as general manager, a position she held until the 2000s, when she started to gradually step out of the station's administration. Yu resigned as CEO in 2003 and became the CEO of PCC Skyhorse, a joint venture company between Commercial Radio and Pacific Century Cyberworks.

== Recent history ==
Yu returned to CR in 2004 as deputy chairman during one of the company's most controversial periods and instituted a number of programming changes. Most notable was the cancellation of Teacup in a Storm (風波裡的茶杯), hosted by Albert Cheng, after much controversy. The host, along with Wong Yuk-man (another radio personality), were fired from the station and new programmes were initiated, including "On A Clear Day".

Yu was involved in a new project created jointly by Commercial Radio and the charity St. James' Settlement and funded by the Hong Kong Jockey Club, Skyhigh, which is described as a media training and creative production house exclusively for disadvantaged youth living in the Tin Shui Wai district of Hong Kong, offering training and job placement within the media industry.

In 2015, Yu resigned from CR after more than four decades, effective January 1, 2016.
