= Midsayap =

Municipality in Cotabato, Philippines

- Municipality
- Municipality of Midsayap
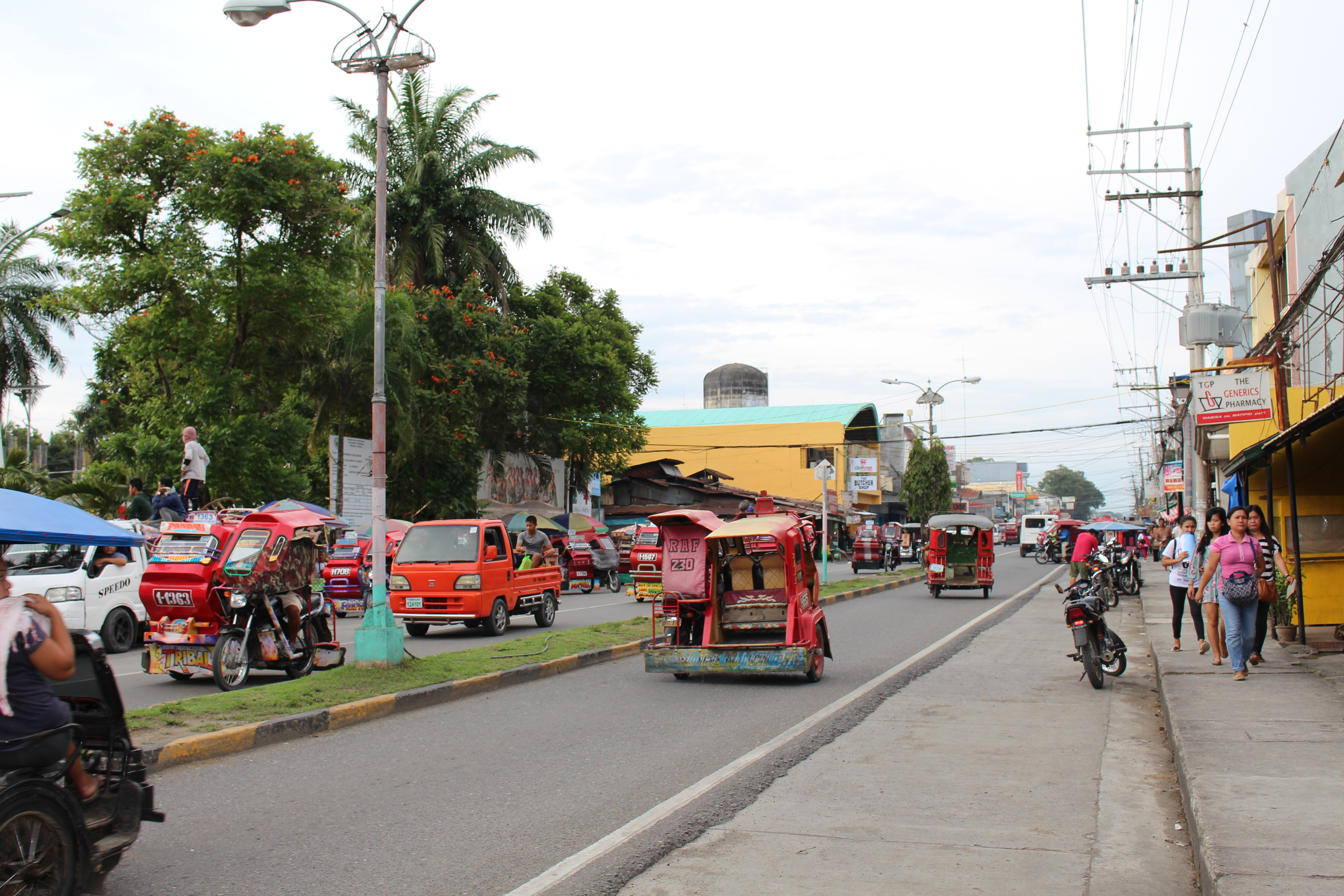
- Downtown of Midsayap

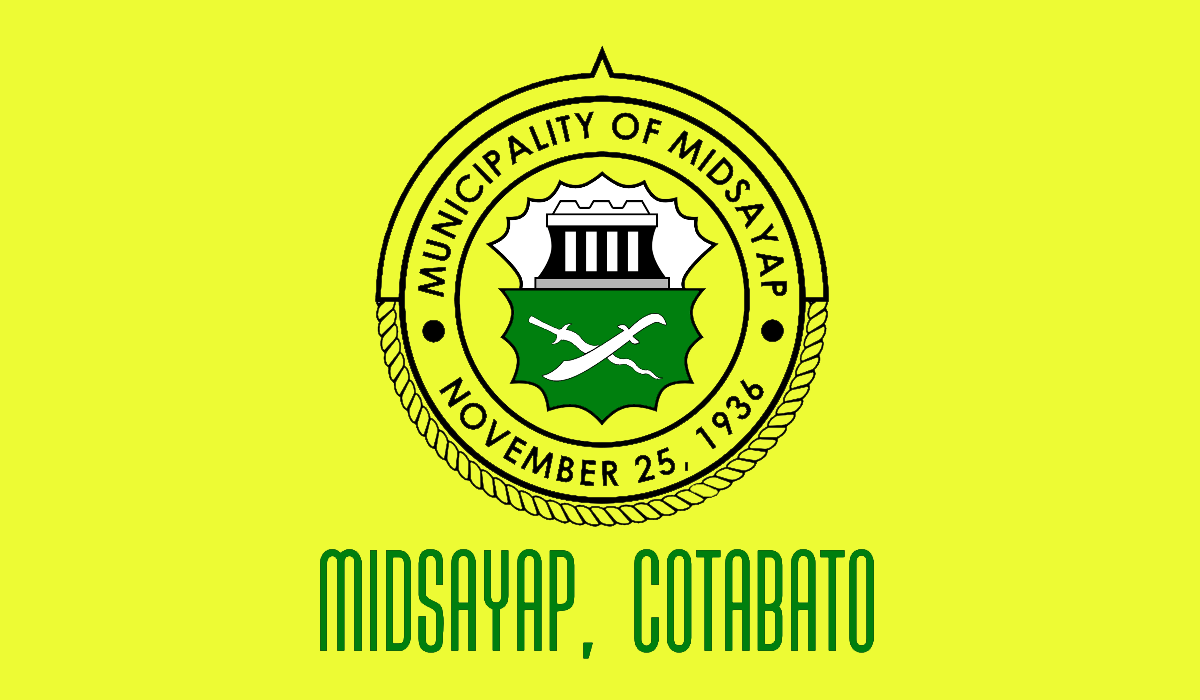
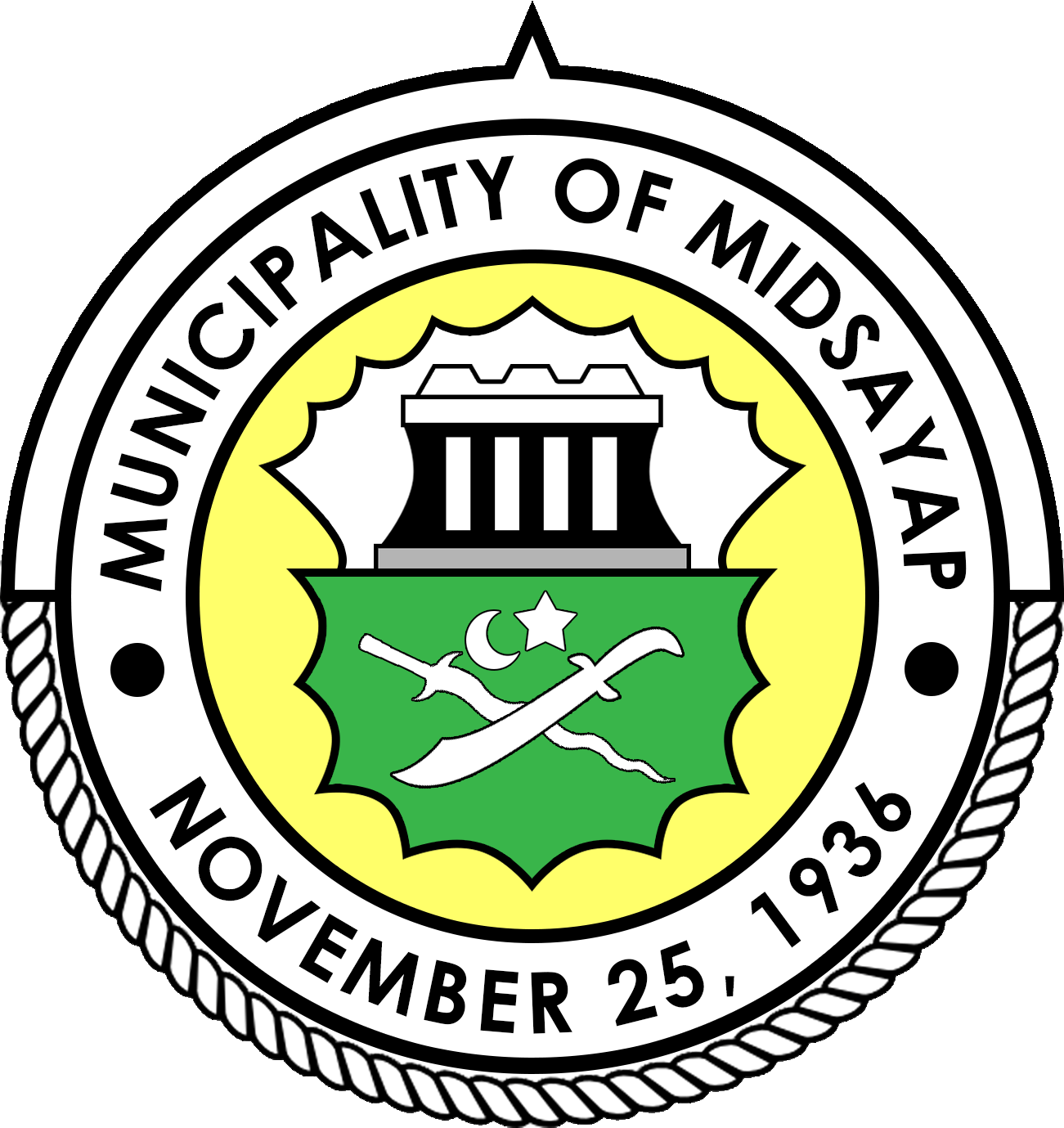
- Flag Seal
- Motto: Masayang Midsayap: Ang Saya-saya
- Map of Cotabato with Midsayap highlighted
- Interactive map of Midsayap
- Location within the Philippines
- Coordinates: 7°11′22″N 124°32′00″E
- Country: Philippines
- Region: Soccsksargen
- Province: Cotabato
- District: 1st district
- Founded: November 25, 1936
- Barangays: 44 (see Barangays)

Government
  - Type: Sangguniang Bayan
  - Mayor: Rolando C. Sacdalan
  - Vice Mayor: Manuel M. Rabara, DDM
  - Representative: Edwin Cruzado
  - Municipal Council: Members: Ellavi Grace B. Doletin; Chelin Monica J. Araña; Justine Clio M. Ostique; Ian B. Ostique; Morata Q. Mantil; Antonio F. Bayya, Jr.; Christopher D. Jatico; Albert Luis L. Garduque
  - Electorate: 60,644 voters (2025)

Area
  - Total: 186.47 km^{2} (72.00 sq mi)
- Elevation: 29 m (95 ft)
- Highest elevation: 112 m (367 ft)
- Lowest elevation: 5 m (16 ft)

Population (2024 census)
  - Total: 117,365
  - Density: 629.40/km^{2} (1,630.1/sq mi)
  - Households: 28,486

Economy
  - Income class: 1st municipal income class
  - Poverty incidence: 17.85% (2023)
  - Revenue: ₱ 502.4 million (2024)
  - Assets: ₱ 2,608 million (2024)
  - Expenditure: ₱ 316.2 million (2024)
  - Liabilities: ₱ 1,489 million (2024)

Service provider
  - Electricity: Cotabato Electric Cooperative (COTELCO)
- Time zone: UTC+8 (PST)
- ZIP code: 9410
- PSGC: 1204709000
- IDD : area code: +63 (0)64
- Native languages: Maguindanao; Hiligaynon; Cebuano; Ilianen; Tagalog
- Website: www.midsayap-cotabatoprov.gov.ph

Midsayap, officially the Municipality of Midsayap (Maguindanaon: Inged nu Midsayap, Jawi: ايڠد نو ميدسايڤ; Iranun: Inged a Midsayap, ايڠد نو ميدسايۏ; Hiligaynon: Banwa sang Midsayap; Cebuano: Lungsod sa Midsayap; Tagalog: Bayan ng Midsayap), is a municipality in the Province of Cotabato, Philippines. According to the 2024 census, it has a population of 115,735 people.

== History ==
Midsayap was derived from a Maguindanaon term which means (Mid) Center and (Sayap) Straw Hat. Midsayap means a straw hat at the center – just like a hill centrally located at the Municipality which slopes through the plains in a shape of a hat. Other version relates that Midsayap came from a Maguindanaon term which means "person wore a straw hat". From 1912 to 1926, Midsayap was then a district of Dulawan and Pikit. Originally, Midsayap was inhabited by Muslims from the descendants of Sultan Ali Bayao from the lineage of Sultan Dipatuan Kudarat I. The seat of their sultanate was established at Libungan Torreta (now part of Pigcawayan).

In 1927, a Philippine Constabulary (PC) Commander assigned in the area, Ist Lt. Catalino Javier, initiated the development of some portions of the municipality. Seeing the natural bounty of the area, he invited settlers from Luzon and Visayas to migrate in the area. The first wave of settlers who dared develop the wilderness was the late Antonio Labasan from Zambales. Among his companions were 23 interrelated families, the Rosete, Almazan, Dumlaos, Flautas, Fernandezes, Quiñoneses, Fermils, Fantones and Documos who settled at Sitio Salunayan and Bual. Visayan settlers from Pikit also came to settle at Bual - the place of Datu Guiambangan Dilangalen. The Visayan migrants were headed by Gregorio Bingil, Julio Anito and Tomas Cantoy. The idea of making Midsayap as a separate political district from the mother municipalities of Dulawan and Pikit was envisioned in 1930 by a group of Christian PC enlisted men who were assigned at Camp Ward. Their efforts, through the support of the deputy governor and military governor was realized in 1936.

Pursuant to Executive Order No. 66 dated November 25, 1936, Midsayap was created as a separate municipality. On January 1, 1937, it was inaugurated with Lorenzo Gonzales as its first appointed municipal mayor. In 1939, Juan Jaranilla became the first elected mayor of the municipality and served in that position until 1941.

Midsayap started with 71 barangays. Later, it was trimmed down to 42 when Libungan was separated from Midsayap in 1936. At present, Midsayap has 44 barangays. Population settlements were concentrated on the barangays of Sinawingan, Salunayan, Bual, Kapayawi, Barongis, Kimagango, Kiwanan, Katingawan, Ulamian, Baguer, Kapinpilan, Olandang, San Mateo, and Baliki. The following years showed the growth of the newly formed town. Gradually, new towns has been created. These are Pigcawayan (Pigkawayan), Libungan, Alamada, and lastly in 1982, Aleosan.

Before the creation of the Bangsamoro Special Geographic Area in 2019, Midsayap was the most populous settlement in the province of North Cotabato. With the creation of the aforementioned area, several of its barangays were carved out from the municipality and were thus duly turned over to the Bangsamoro government, creating special governance clusters in their place, thus its area of jurisdiction as well as its population and number of barangays was reduced to its current status. While still a large town despite the reduction, it is one of the oldest settlements of migrants from Luzon and the Visayas, thereby giving its reputation as the highly heterogeneous society in this once Muslim-dominated place of Mindanaon.

=== Partial inclusion to the Bangsamoro ===
In 2019, thirteen barangays were among the 63 in the province which became part of the Special Geographic Area of the newly created Bangsamoro, after having the affirmative vote won to join the autonomous region in a plebiscite held on February 6. Twelve of them were among the 39 in the province that unsuccessfully voted for the inclusion in the Autonomous Region in Muslim Mindanao in 2001, while Tumbras was proposed to be part of the Bangsamoro, which replaced ARMM by virtue of Republic Act No. 11054.

In 2023, the Bangsamoro Parliament approved the creation of eight new municipalities in the area. Seven of those barangays were organized into Kadayangan (Bangsamoro Autonomy Act No. 42); the rest, along with Dunguan in Aleosan, became part of Nabalawag (BAA No. 43); following ratification in a plebiscite on April 13, 2024.

== Geography ==
Midsayap is geographically located at the Southwestern portion of Cotabato. It is bounded on the north by the Municipality of Libungan; on the south by the Rio Grande de Mindanao; on the east by the municipalities of Aleosan and Pikit; and on the west by the Municipality of Kabuntalan.

Midsayap is approximately 47 kilometres (29 mi) away from Cotabato City and some 174 kilometres (108 mi) from Davao City, two of the major urban centers in Mindanao. It is about 64 kilometres (40 mi) away from Kidapawan City, the seat of the Provincial Government.

Midsayap has a total land area of 29,042 hectares comprising 57 barangays which is 5.03% of the total land area of Cotabato. Some of the barangays (Southern and Western part) are along the big bodies of water, thus making it accessible by water transportation. However, due to the construction of a concrete bridge at Dulawan towards the province of Sultan Kudarat and some municipalities of Maguindanao del Sur, land transportation is now feasible. The town is traversed by the Davao-Cotabato and the Midsayap-Makar national highways (General Santos).

=== Barangays ===
It is politically subdivided into 44 barangays. Each barangay consists of puroks while some have sitios.

- Agriculture
- Anonang
- Arizona
- Bagumba
- Baliki
- Bitoka
- Bual Norte
- Bual Sur
- Central Bulanan
- Central Glad
- Ilbocean
- Central Katingawan
- Kimagango
- Kiwanan
- Lagumbingan
- Lomopog (exclave)
- Lower Glad
- Lower Katingawan
- Macasendeg
- Malamote
- Milaya
- Nalin
- Nes
- Patindeguen
- Palongoguen
- Barangay Poblacion 1
- Barangay Poblacion 2
- Barangay Poblacion 3
- Barangay Poblacion 4
- Barangay Poblacion 5
- Barangay Poblacion 6
- Barangay Poblacion 7
- Barangay Poblacion 8
- Rangeba
- Sadaan
- Salunayan
- San Isidro
- San Pedro
- Santa Cruz
- Upper Bulanan
- Upper Glad I
- Upper Glad II
- Upper Labas
- Villarica

=== Climate ===
Climate data for Midsayap, Cotabato
| Month | Jan | Feb | Mar | Apr | May | Jun | Jul | Aug | Sep | Oct | Nov | Dec | Year |
|---|---|---|---|---|---|---|---|---|---|---|---|---|---|
| Mean daily maximum °C (°F) | 32 (90) | 32 (90) | 33 (91) | 33 (91) | 31 (88) | 30 (86) | 30 (86) | 30 (86) | 31 (88) | 30 (86) | 31 (88) | 31 (88) | 31 (88) |
| Mean daily minimum °C (°F) | 22 (72) | 22 (72) | 22 (72) | 23 (73) | 24 (75) | 24 (75) | 23 (73) | 23 (73) | 23 (73) | 23 (73) | 23 (73) | 22 (72) | 23 (73) |
| Average rainfall mm (inches) | 167 (6.6) | 127 (5.0) | 136 (5.4) | 134 (5.3) | 208 (8.2) | 203 (8.0) | 203 (8.0) | 187 (7.4) | 160 (6.3) | 224 (8.8) | 172 (6.8) | 153 (6.0) | 2,074 (81.8) |
| Average rainy days | 10.1 | 7.5 | 10.0 | 11.5 | 19.7 | 20.8 | 19.4 | 18.5 | 16.3 | 18.5 | 18.4 | 12.8 | 183.5 |
Source: Meteoblue

The province is situated between 5 and 8 degrees latitude thus Midsayap and all areas within its jurisdiction are less affected by typhoons. The municipality falls under the fourth type of climate which is characterized by more or less even distribution of rainfall throughout the year.

=== Land capability ===
The highest portion of municipal land area – 12,397.5 hectares (30,635 acres) – is classified as good land. These are the land centrally located in the municipality. These lands are nearly level lands and can be cultivate safely. However, protection from occasional overflow is required. The 10,651.2869 hectares which are Hydrosol type are wetlands and are suitable for fishpond or recreation purposes. Most of these lands are along the Rio Grande de Mindanao. The Center type of land are moderately good land, moderately sloping so that cultivation requires carefully planned erosion control measures. These lands are on the Northeastern barangays and a portion of Nabalawag and Kadingilan with an area of 8,010.0 hectares.

=== Soil type ===
There are four (4) types of soil in this municipality. These are: Kabacan Clay, Kudarangan Clay, San Manuel Silty Clay Loam and Hydrosol. Kabacan Clay Loam is about 12,397.500 hectares or 37.52% of the municipal land area.

These are the soils at the central portion or at the heart of the municipality. Kudarangan Clay Loam is found in slightly rolling to hilly terrain or at the north-eastern barangays. This soil type occupies the 24.24 percent of the municipal area or 8,010.00 hectares. San Manuel Silty Clay Loam is located at barangays Upper Labas, Nalin and portions of barangay Villarica. This occupies an area of 1,980 hectares. Hydrosol type has an area of 10,651.2869 hectares or 33.24 percent of the municipal area.

=== Slope ===
Of the total land area of the municipality, 73.79 percent or 24,376.2869 hectares has a slope of 0–3 percent. These areas are located at the western and southern part of the municipality. These are mostly the irrigable rice lands.

The Northeastern barangays, a portion of Central Bulanan are hilly with slopes with 3-8% with a total area of 6,525.0 hectares. Highest slopes of 8–18% percent are situated at the boundary of barangays Nabalawag and Kadingilan and a portion of Central Bulanan. This has a total land area of 2,137.5 hectares.

=== Topography ===
Midsayap is characterized as plain to hilly terrain. Gently rolling to hilly areas are located on the Northeastern portion specifically at barangays - Kiwanan, Kimagango, Anonang, Malamote, Upper Bulanan and Milaya. A portion of Kadingilan and Nabalawag has a hilly portion at their boundaries. All barangays on the western portion which is cut by the National Highway from Poblacion to Dulawan is plain and is presently planted with irrigated rice and other crops. The southernmost barangays are marshy being located along the Rio Grande de Mindanao.

== Demographics ==
Population census of Midsayap
| Year | Pop. | ±% p.a. |
|---|---|---|
| 1939 | 23,033 | — |
| 1948 | 42,473 | +7.04% |
| 1960 | 46,169 | +0.70% |
| 1970 | 47,093 | +0.20% |
| 1975 | 52,142 | +2.06% |
| 1980 | 66,952 | +5.13% |
| 1990 | 84,041 | +2.30% |
| 1995 | 96,771 | +2.68% |
| 2000 | 105,760 | +1.92% |
| 2007 | 123,324 | +2.14% |
| 2010 | 134,170 | +3.12% |
| 2015 | 151,684 | +2.36% |
| 2020 | 117,365 | −5.26% |
| 2024 | 115,735 | −0.34% |
Source: Philippine Statistics Authority; 2020 Census count was revised as per PSA Board Resolution; No. 13 Series of 2021 adopted on November 9, 2021.

In the 2024 census, the population of Midsayap was 115,735 people, with a density of 400 inhabitants per square kilometre or 1,000 inhabitants per square mile.

The 2010 Census of Population and Housing of the Philippine Statistics Authority recorded the population of Midsayap at 134,170. It is the most populous among the municipalities of the province.

Growing at the pace of 1.92 percent for the past five years, the town is expected to double its population within 36 years.

Midsayap is populated mainly by Maguindanaons and as well as multi-cultural mix of peoples from the influx of migrants from Luzon and the Visayas, drawn to Mindanao's reputation as a promising haven for settlers.

=== Languages ===
Cebuano and Tagalog are the widely spoken language. They are also common for people speaking different languages such as Maguindanaon, Iranun, Hiligaynon, Ilocano, Manobo, Waray, among others.

== Economy ==
Poverty incidence of Midsayap (%)

Source: Philippine Statistics Authority

Characterized to have a clay type of soil that is best suited for agricultural use, most (42.03 percent) of the town's land area are devoted to agricultural production. The lowland areas were planted with rice and other seasonal crops while the upland areas were planted with permanent crops. Agricultural products of the town include rice, corn, mango, coffee, coconut, banana, vegetables and root crops.

Aside from the thriving agriculture industry, Midsayap also boasts of its other industries such as cut flowers and ornamental plants, livestock and poultry, furnitures and decorative crafts and telecommunications. It is also a potential area for putting up other industries such as fruit and meat processing as well as oil palm plantation and processing.

Midsayap is a commercial and trading center for the province; farmers from neighboring municipalities bring their agricultural products to be sold or traded there. Industry in the first district of North Cotabato is concentrated in the PPALMA area (Pigcawayan, Pikit, Alamada, Libungan, Midsayap, Aleosan). In 2016, Midsayap was ranked the fifth most competitive municipality in the Philippines and first in Mindanao.

=== Cotabato City-Kidapawan City (CK) with Midsayap Agri-industrial and Eco Tourism Corridor ===
Is an Agri-industrial and Eco Tourism Corridor projected by the NEDA region 12, the primary growth node in this corridor is Cotabato City with Kidapawan City and Midsayap as intermediate urban centers.

Cotabato City, as the primary urban center in this corridor, serves as the institutional, financial and service center, also the center of public health with the existence of the Cotabato Regional and Medical Center, and the de facto capital of BARMM. The city is a special economic zone is expected to diversify its economic base and will facilitate the creation of more investment and job opportunities.

Cotabato Province ranks first in the region in rice and rubber production, second in corn and produces organic coco sugar and delicious tropical fruits. It hosts processing plants for palm oil, sugar cane and rubber. The Mount Apo Geothermal Power plant in Kidapawan City generates 52 megawatts.

The Gross Domestic Product of the Municipality (2022) is 19,303,298,841(PHP).

== Tourism ==
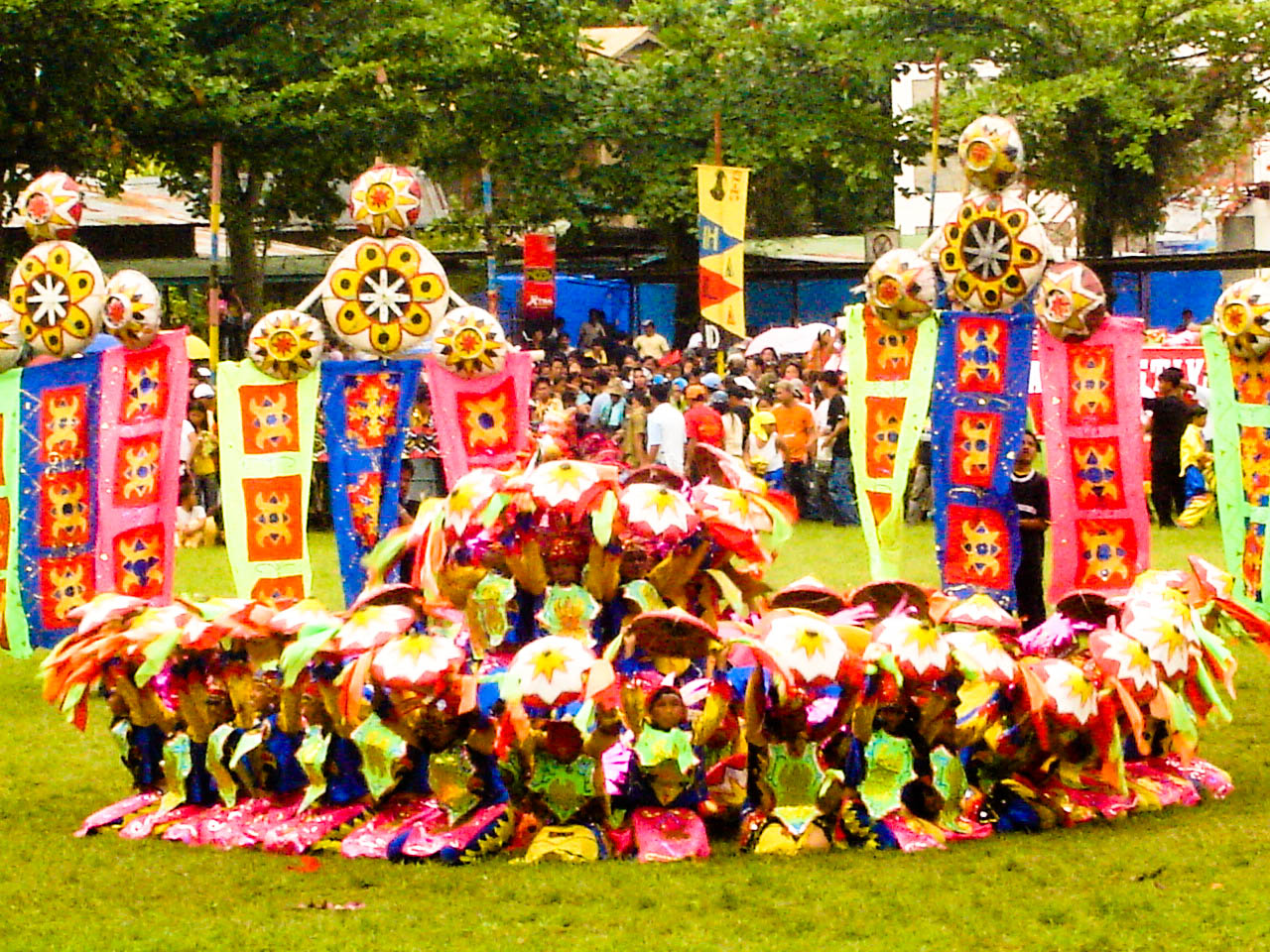
Halad sa Santo Niño Festival

Annually, the townsfolk of Midsayap prepares for its colorful street dancing and parade competition popularly known as the "Halad sa Santo Niño Festival" as part of its grand fiesta celebration, which is held every third Sunday of January. The Halad Festival is celebrated in honor of the town's patron saint Señor Santo Niño.

Groups from various towns in Cotabato Province as well as neighboring towns of Maguindanao del Norte and Maguindanao del Sur troop annually to Midsayap to participate in the contest, which is recognized by the Department of Tourism as a major festival.

This event started in 1988 through the efforts of REACT Philippines Midsayap Chapter in coordination with the Santo Niño Parish Pastoral Council and became a yearly event.

The festival first gained national recognition when the 1997 Halad champions, Eramis Clan, flew to Manila to compete in the National Finals and bested champions of other major festivals such as the Sinulog Festival of Cebu and the Dinagyang Festival of Iloilo.

The Halad festival re-established its status as a major festival when the 2003 Halad champions, the Dado Alamada National High School, represented Region XII in the national street dancing competition and won the ₱1 million grand prize in the Aliwan Fiesta held in May 2003 in Manila. Inspired by their back-to-back wins, the group participated again in the Pamaskong Aliwan Festival in December of that same year and also won the grand prize. Both festivals were part of the Visit Philippines 2003 program of the Department of Tourism.

== Infrastructure ==
=== Transportation ===
Midsayap is served by almost 2,000 tricycles, either traversing through the main highways or within barangays, which are known locally as "tri-sikad".

Transportation to its barangays and adjacent municipalities are also served by Multicabs, Jeepneys, Dagit-Dagit (single motor) and L300 Vans.

The public bus transport system, maintained by the Mindanao Star Bus Company (formerly Weena Express Bus Company), serves the Davao City—Cotabato City Route which passes through the cities of Kidapawan and Digos. In 2021, Rural Transit Mindanao Inc. (RTMI) another bus operator from Vallacar Transit opened its route between Dipolog City - General Santos City that stops at Midsayap as one of its stopovers. Overall, Vallacar Transit or The Yanson Group is the main bus operator in Midsayap serveing routes between Cotabato City, Davao City, Dipolog City, and General Santos City

Public Utility Vans also serve routes to and from the cities of Davao City, Cotabato City, Cagayan de Oro, Tacurong-Isulan, Koronadal and General Santos.

=== Agencies based in Midsayap ===
The following are the list of the National Agencies Regional Branch Office in this municipality:

- Philippine Rice Research Institute
- Bureau of Plant Industry - National Seed Quality Control Services
- Malaria Control Services
- National Irrigation Administration Region XII

=== Health and medical institutions ===
Midsayap is also very accessible to health facilities thereby a reliable place to go. Medical and diagnostic facilities in the town are:

- A&F Medical Diagnostic Laboratory (Poblacion 5, Midsayap, Cotabato)
- ALAMed Clinical Laboratory (Poblacion 2, Midsayap, Cotabato)
- Anecito T. Pesante Sr. Memorial Hospital Co. (Cor. Pioneer & Tiza St., Poblacion 1, Midsayap, Cotabato)
- Community Health Service Cooperative Hospital (formerly Midsayap Community Doctors Hospital) (Poblacion 8, Midsayap, Cotabato)
- Dr. Amado B. Diaz Provincial Foundation Hospital, Inc. (Roosevelt St., Poblacion 4, Midsayap, Cotabato)
- Dr. Roland P. Dela Cruz Memorial Hospital, Inc. (managed by Midsayap Medical Specialists, Inc.) (Poblacion 8, Midsayap, Cotabato)
- E-Lab Polyclinic and Laboratory (Lapu-Lapu St., Poblacion 3, Midsayap, Cotabato)
- Guinmapang Medical Clinic and Laboratory (Quezon Ave., Poblacion 6, Midsayap, Cotabato)
- Holy Child Medical City, Inc. (managed by Midsayap United Medical Doctors Hospital, Inc.) (Poblacion 8, Midsayap, Cotabato)
- i-Care Medical Imaging and Diagnostic Center (i-Link CST Bldg., National Highway, Poblacion 8, Midsayap, Cotabato)
- Midsayap Diagnostic Center and Hospital, Inc. (National Highway, Poblacion 8, Midsayap, Cotabato)
- Midsayap Doctors Specialist Hospital, Inc. (Quezon Ave., Poblacion 6, Midsayap, Cotabato)
- Midsayap Neuro Imaging Center, Inc. (Poblacion 8, Midsayap, Cotabato)
- Partners Ultrasound and X-ray Clinic (Madonna Plaza Bldg., Quezon Ave., Poblacion 5, Midsayap, Cotabato)
- PPALMA Cardiovascular Center Inc. (Sol Haus Bldg., Poblacion 6, Midsayap, Cotabato)
- Specialists Clinic & Diagnostic Laboratory (Martin Bldg., Santo Niño St., Poblacion 8, Midsayap, Cotabato)
- Tarongoy Medical Clinic (Quezon Avenue, Midsayap, Cotabato)
- Rural Health Unit (RHU − Midsayap) (Poblacion 5, Midsayap, Cotabato)
- Barangay Health Stations and Birthing Homes across the municipality

== Education ==
It is home to two major college campuses, namely Notre Dame of Midsayap College, the first school in Asia of the Notre Dame educational system, and Southern Christian College of the United Church of Christ in the Philippines as well as a host of privately owned tertiary schools offering business, technical, and allied health courses.

It also has an extensive public and private school system (both elementary and secondary) where basic education is delivered in almost all of its barangays.

Furthermore, Midsayap operates day-care centers in all of its 57 barangays for pre-schoolers to begin their early child education.

=== Tertiary ===
- Cotabato Medical Foundation College Inc.
- I-link College of Science and Technology
- Midsayap Community College
- Notre Dame of Midsayap College
- Our Lady of Wisdom Academy
- Polytechnic College of Greater Midsayap Cotabato
- Southern Christian College
- St. Jude College of Science and Technology

=== Secondary ===
Public

- Dilangalen National High School**
- Agriculture High School
- Baliki High School
- Arizona High School**
- Elpidio Singco (Kiwanan) High School
- Juan Dillo (Anonang) High School
- Kimagango National High School**
- Malamote National High School
- Malingao High School (Salunayan Annex)
- Nabalawag High School
- Olandang National High School**
- Patindeguen High School**
- Sadaan High School
- Salunayan High School**
- Salunayan High School (Kapinpilan Annex)
- Salunayan High School (Dabpil Sampulna Olandang Annex)
- Simeon Panganiban High School (formerly Dilangalen National High School Bual Extension)
- Tukuran T. Kendenga High School
- Villarica National High School**

** Schools with Senior High School Curriculum

Private

- I-link College of Science and Technology**
- Katingawan Adventist Academy
- Midsayap Community College**
- Notre Dame of Midsayap College High School**
- Our Lady of Wisdom Academy
- Saint Mary's Academy of Midsayap**
- Southern Christian College High School**
- St. Jude College of Science and Technology**

** Schools with Senior High School Curriculum

=== Elementary ===
Public

Midsayap Central:

- Central Katingawan Elementary School
- Midsayap Pilot Elementary School
- Miguel Intes (Katingawan) Elementary School
- Patindeguen Elementary School
- S. Panganiban (Bual) Elementary School
- San Isidro Elementary School

Midsayap North:

- Anonang Elementary School
- Arizona Elementary School
- Elesio (Nalin) Elementary School
- Ilbocean Elementary School
- Kimagango Central Elementary School
- Kimagango Elementary School - Annex
- Lt. Andres Calungsod Elementary School
- Madendog Primary School
- Malamote Elementary School
- Milaya Elementary School
- Upper Bulanan Elementary School
- Upper Labas Elementary School
- Villarica Elementary School

Midsayap South:

- Bitoka Elementary School
- Central Bulanan Elementary School
- Central Glad Elementary School
- Dilangalen Central Elementary School
- Dr. C.H. Deles (Upper Glad) Elementary School
- Elpidio Singco (Kiwanan) Elementary School
- Lower Kiwanan Elementary School
- Sadaan Elementary School
- San Pedro Elementary School
- Santa Cruz Elementary School

Midsayap South-West:

- Agriculture Central Elementary School
- Baliki Elementary School
- Don Miguel Latada (Tumbras) Elementary School
- Flauta (Lower Glad) Elementary School
- Joaquin P. Mostrales (Lagumbingan) Elementary School
- Lt. Jesus Yermo (Bagumba) Elementary School
- Malingao Elementary School
- Nes Elementary School
- Rangeban Elementary School
- Salunayan Elementary School
- Vicente Rapacon Memorial (Palongoguen) Elementary School

Midsayap West:

- D.D. Dilangalen (Tugal) Elementary School
- Dabpil Sampulna (Olandang) Primary School
- Damatulan Elementary School
- Datu Guilem Piang (Upper Olandang) Elementary School
- Guntong Primary School
- Hadji Ungkakay (Lower Olandang) Elementary School
- Kadigasan Elementary School
- Kadingilan (Pagao Memorial) Primary School
- Kapinpilan Endaila Silongan Central Elementary
- Kudarangan Elementary School
- Lomopog Elementary School
- Macasendeg Elementary School
- Mudseng Elementary School
- Nabalawag Elementary School
- Sambulawan Elementary School

Private

- Cedar School of Arts and Technology
- Great & Mighty Learning Center of Midsayap, Inc.
- Katingawan Seventh-day Adventist Elementary School
- Midsayap Baptist Elementary School
- Midsayap Good Shepherd Learning Center
- Midsayap Montessori Centre
- Notre Dame of Midsayap College - Elementary Training Department
- Our Lady of Wisdom Academy
- Rufino Redoble Sr. Memorial Learning Center, Inc.
- Southern Christian College - Elementary Training Department
- Sunbeam Midsayap Alliance Learning Centre, Inc.

== Media ==
=== FM Radio Stations ===
- 94.3 Power Radio (Hypersonic Broadcasting Center)
- 95.1 Muews Radio (Sagay Broadcasting Corporation)
- 96.5 DABIG C Radio (Prime Broadcasting Network)
- 97.3 T Radio Pigcawayan (ELT ADZ and Communication Services)
- 100.5 Radyo Bandera (Bandera News Philippines/Fairwaves Broadcasting Network)
- 103.3 Max FM (Rizal Memorial Colleges Broadcasting Corporation)
- 104.1 Wow FM (Polytechnic Foundation of Cotabato and Asia)
- 106.1 Brigada News FM (Brigada Mass Media Corporation)

=== Cable and Satellite TV ===
- JVL Star Cable
- Midsayap Cable and Telecommunication Services, Inc.
- Cignal TV
