= DXKM =

DXKM may refer to:

- DXKM (General Santos), a defunct FM radio station in General Santos
- DXKM (Kidapawan), an FM radio station broadcasting in Kidapawan, branded as Nonglading Radio
