= Teacup in a Storm =

Hong Kong radio show

Teacup in a Storm (Chinese: 風波裏的茶杯) is a popular radio show in D100, and previously broadcast in Commercial Radio Hong Kong and Digital Broadcasting Corporation Hong Kong. It was modeled after CNN's Crossfire (TV series). This show discussed and aired grievances by callers about the government. The name is a play on the English idiom "storm in a teacup".

It has been called one of the most influential radio talk shows in Hong Kong.

Past hosts included Allen Lee and Albert Cheng.
