= Kiamba National High School =

Public high school in Sarangani, Philippines

Location
- Poblacion, Kiamba, Sarangani; Philippines; 5°59′33″N 124°37′20″E

Information
- Type: Public Secondary School
- Established: 1987
- Principal: Jemima Miero-Panes
- Language: English, Filipino, Bisayan, Ilokano, Muslim, B'laan etc.
- Nickname: KNHS
- Publication: 'The Gleam' (English)
- Affiliations: Division of Sarangani
- Website: 202.91.162.20/kiambaHS

Kiamba National High School (KNHS) is one of the three public high schools in the municipality of Kiamba, Sarangani. It was founded in 1987 as an annex municipal high school of Colon Barangay High School in its nearby municipality of Maasim, Sarangani.

== Student Clubs ==
- Supreme Student Government
- School Publication
- English Club
- Science & TechnologyClub
- Mathematics Club
- Filipino Club
- MAPEH Club
- Araling Panlipunan Club
- TLE Club
- ESWM Advocates Club
