= DXDZ-FM =

Radio station in Iligan, Philippines

The Edge (DXDZ)
Iligan; Philippines
- Broadcast area: Lanao del Norte, parts of Lanao del Sur
- Frequency: 92.9 MHz
- Branding: The Edge 92.9

Programming
- Languages: Cebuano, Filipino
- Format: Contemporary MOR, News, Talk

Ownership
- Owner: Rizal Memorial Colleges Broadcasting Corporation
- Operator: Alemania Group of Companies

History
- First air date: 2009 (as The Edge); 2012 (as FM95); 2016 (as The Edge)
- Former frequencies: 95.9 MHz (2009–2017)

Technical information
- Licensing authority: NTC
- Class: C, D and E
- Power: 5,000 watts
- ERP: 10,000 watts

DXDZ (92.9 FM), on-air as The Edge 92.9, is a radio station owned by Rizal Memorial Colleges Broadcasting Corporation and operated by Alemania Group of Companies, a local group owned by Marianito Alemania. The station's studio is located in Plaza Alemania Hotel, Quezon Ave. Ext., Iligan.

It used to be the city's only Top 40 station until its reformat in mid-2012.
