= DXRA =

Davao City; Philippines
- Broadcast area: Davao Region and surrounding areas
- Frequency: 783 kHz

Programming
- Format: Silent

Ownership
- Owner: Rizal Memorial Colleges Broadcasting Corporation
- Sister stations: 94.7 Max FM

History
- First air date: 1975
- Last air date: December 31, 2020
- Former names: Radyo Arangkada; Radyo ni Juan
- Former frequencies: 780 kHz (1975–1978)
- Call sign meaning: Radyo Arangkada

Technical information
- Licensing authority: NTC

DXRA (783 AM) was a radio station owned and operated by Rizal Memorial Colleges Broadcasting Corporation.

== History ==
On August 27, 1987, DXRA was attacked by the New People's Army, in what became known as the DXRA Massacre, resulting in nine deaths.

In 2012, DXRA became part of the Radyo ni Juan network under the helm of the broadcaster Dodong Solis. It served as its flagship station throughout its existence.

On December 31, 2020, the station, along with most of Radyo ni Juan stations, went off the air due to financial problems.
