= Joel Delacy =

Australian broadcaster

Joel Delacy is a Hong Kong–based broadcaster. Born in Australia in November 1956, Delacy has been part of the Hong Kong broadcasting industry since 1979. Delacy currently works as the morning news anchor on Commercial Radio's English Channel. Prior to joining the newsroom, Delacy worked as a DJ. Before Hong Kong's handover to Beijing in 1997, he had produced and presented many programmes. These include sports programming like the annual live broadcasts from the Hong Kong Rugby sevens.

He has also worked as a presenter, voice over artist and writer at ATV, Hong Kong.

== Albert Cheng incident ==
Delacy was the third person on the scene after the gruesome attack on Commercial Radio colleague Albert Cheng on August 19, 1998, and was the only person to offer assistance. He applied tourniquets until police arrived with a first aid kit. Delacy then went back inside the building, and after washing the blood off his hands, wrote the story about the attack and fifteen minutes later, in a shaky voice, read the story in the 7am newscast.

== Interests ==
Outside the broadcast industry, he has an active interest in Hong Kong heritage and railways.
