= D100 Radio =

Internet radio station in Hong Kong

- Industry: Internet radio
- Founders: Albert Cheng
- Website: d100.net

D100 is an Internet radio station established by Albert Cheng. The radio station was established due to the closure of Digital Broadcasting Corporation.

== History ==
Albert Cheng was prompted to establish D100 due to a management dispute at the Digital Broadcasting Corporation (DBC). The other shareholders refused to invest in the station as originally planned, and leaked recordings suggested this was due to interference by the Hong Kong Liaison Office over Cheng's decision to hire a pro-democracy radio host. Cheng thus left the station to found D100.

== Telephone broadcasting ==
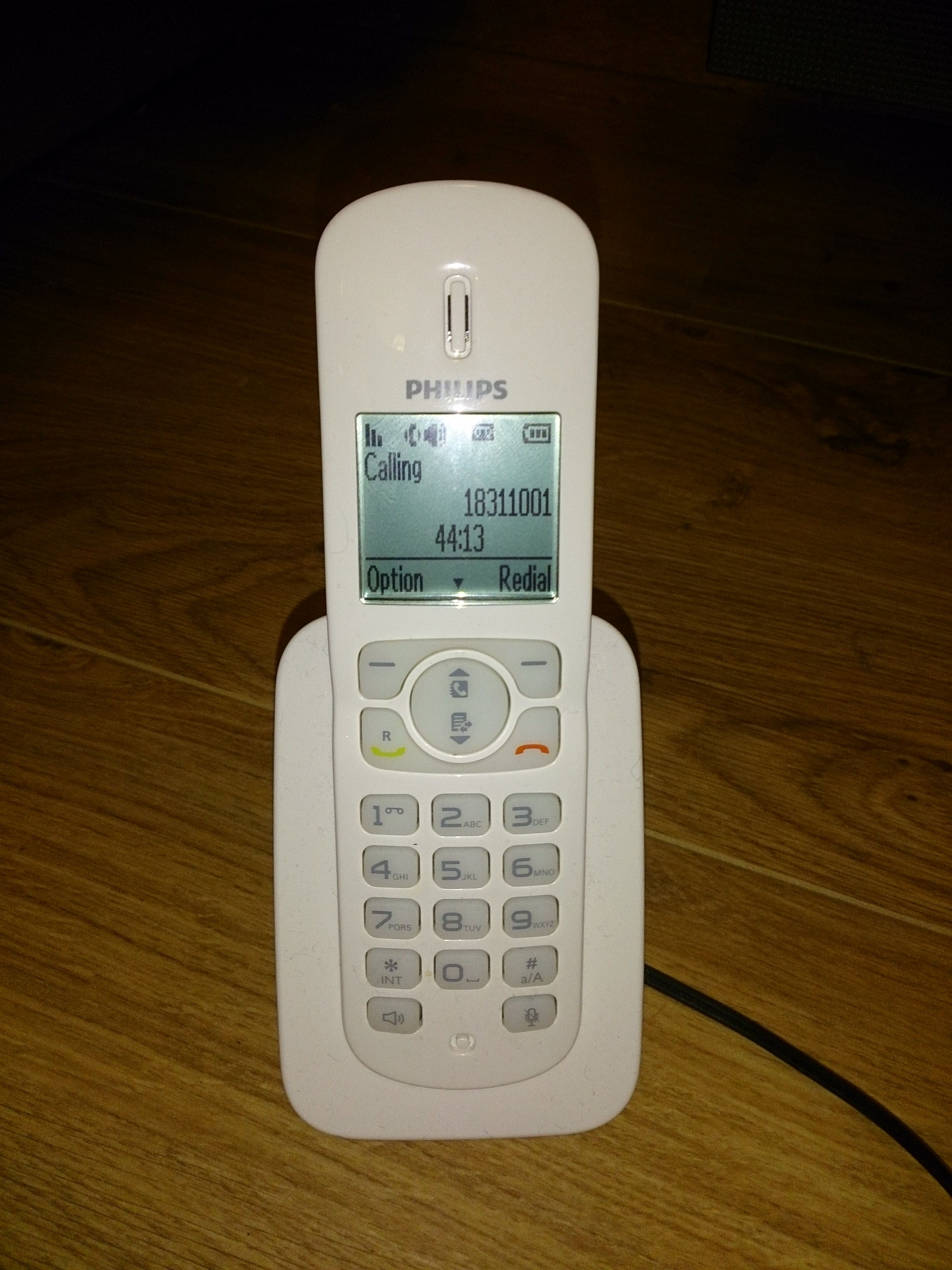
Speaker phone being used to listen to D100 via a telephone line

D100 also offers a unique service where listeners can tune in via a telephone line. This service has been particularly useful for audiences who may not have easy access to the internet. By dialing a specific number, listeners can enjoy live broadcasts and stay connected with their favorite programs. This telephone broadcasting service ensures that D100's content is accessible to a wider audience, including elderly individuals and those in areas with limited internet connectivity.

The telephone broadcasting feature has been praised for its simplicity and reliability. It allows listeners to participate in live shows, call in with questions or comments, and stay informed about current events and community issues
