= DYVL-FM =

Philippine radio station

DYVL
Relay of DYDW Cebu City
- Bogo; Philippines
- Broadcast area: Northern Cebu
- Frequency: 94.1 MHz

Programming
- Languages: Cebuano, Filipino
- Format: Contemporary MOR, News, Talk

Ownership
- Owner: Rizal Memorial Colleges Broadcasting Corporation
- Operator: RSV Broadcasting Network

History
- First air date: 2013
- Former names: Cool FM (2013-2020); DYVL (2020-2025)

Technical information
- Licensing authority: NTC
- Power: 1,000 watts
- ERP: 5,000 watts

DYVL (94.1 FM) is a radio station owned by Rizal Memorial Colleges Broadcasting Corporation and operated by RSV Broadcasting Network. It serves as a relay station of 89.1 Juander Radyo based in Cebu City. Its transmitter is located in Bogo, Cebu.

== History ==
It was established in 2013 under the management of Cebu Roosevelt Memorial Colleges. Initially known as Cool FM, it was known as simply its call letters by 2020. In October 2025, it went off the air after its studio was affected by the earthquake. During its existence, it was located along San Vicente St.

In early July 2026, it went back on air, this time as a relay station of Juander Radyo based in Cebu City. Prior to its transfer, the relay used to broadcast on 107.7 FM from its inception in early 2025.
