= DXSG =

Radyo Natin Kiamba (DXSG)
Kiamba; Philippines
- Broadcast area: Kiamba and surrounding areas
- Branding: Radyo Natin 101.3

Programming
- Languages: Cebuano, Filipino
- Format: Community radio
- Network: Radyo Natin Network

Ownership
- Owner: Manila Broadcasting Company

History
- First air date: 1997
- Call sign meaning: SaranGani

Technical information
- Licensing authority: NTC
- Power: 1,000 watts

Links
- Website: Website

DXSG (101.3 FM), broadcasting as Radyo Natin 101.3, is a radio station owned and operated by Manila Broadcasting Company. Its studios and transmitter are located along Dela Cruz St., Brgy. Poblacion, Kiamba, Sarangani.
