= Midsayap Diagnostic Center and Hospital =

Private hospital in Cotabato, Philippines

- Midsayap Diagnostic Center and Hospital, Inc.

Geography
- Location: National Highway, Poblacion 8, Midsayap, Cotabato, 9410, Philippines
- Coordinates: 7°12′34″N 124°32′17″E

Organization
- Care system: Private
- Type: General

Services
- Emergency department: Yes
- Beds: 58-bed capacity

History
- Founded: May 8, 2000; 26 years ago

Midsayap Diagnostic Center and Hospital, Inc. (abbreviated as MDCHI, locally known as MDC Hospital) is a 70-bed capacity level-1 private healthcare institution licensed and accredited by the Department of Health and PhilHealth on National Highway, Poblacion 8, Midsayap, Cotabato.

== History ==
The hospital was established on March 8, 2000, at a leased and refurbished hospital building located at Quezon Avenue, Poblacion 8, Midsayap, Cotabato, with an initially allowed bed-capacity of ten in-patient accommodations.

A group of five persons — a surgeon, a cardiologist, an OB-gynecologist, a general practitioner, and a registered Medtech — established MDCHI to cater to the growing health needs of the people of Midsayap and its surrounding communities.

The construction of the new hospital edifice began in 2015, according to an asset agreement between The Board and One Network Bank. On February 7, 2017, MDCHI officially transferred operations to the new hospital building at National Highway, Poblacion 8, Midsayap, Cotabato.

== Medical/clinical services ==
- Emergency Medicine
- Internal Medicine
- General Surgery
- Orthopedics
- Urology
- Pediatrics
- Obstetrics and Gynecology
- Anesthesiology
- Ophthalmology
- Dentistry
- ENT
- Radiology
- Pathology
- Family Medicine
- General Practice

== See also ==
- List of hospitals in Philippines
