= DXCI =

Max FM Soccsksargen (DXCI)
- General Santos; Philippines
- Broadcast area: South Cotabato, Sarangani and surrounding areas
- Frequency: 107.1 MHz
- Branding: 107.1 Max News FM

Programming
- Languages: Cebuano, Filipino
- Format: Contemporary MOR, News, Talk
- Network: Max FM

Ownership
- Owner: General Santos Institute
- Operator: Christian Media Management

History
- First air date: November 2020
- Former call signs: DXPF (March 2021–May 2024)
- Former frequencies: 94.7 MHz (November 2020–January 2021); 88.1 MHz (January–March 2021); 95.9 MHz (March 2021–May 2024)

Technical information
- Licensing authority: NTC
- Power: 5 kW

107.1 Max News FM (DXCI 107.1 MHz) is an FM station owned by General Santos Institute and operated by Christian Media Management. Its studios and transmitter are located at J. Catolico Sr. Ave., General Santos.
