= DXCX =

Radio station in Tacurong, Philippines

Juander Radyo Tacurong (DXCX)
- Tacurong; Philippines
- Broadcast area: Northern Sultan Kudarat, parts of Maguindanao and South Cotabato
- Frequency: 88.9 MHz
- Branding: 88.9 Juander Radyo

Programming
- Languages: Hiligaynon, Filipino
- Format: Contemporary MOR, News, Talk
- Network: Juander Radyo

Ownership
- Owner: Rizal Memorial Colleges Broadcasting Corporation
- Operator: RSV Broadcasting Network

History
- First air date: 2019
- Former names: Radyo ni Juan (2019-2025); XFM (2025-2026)
- Former frequencies: 88.3 MHz (2019-2025)

Technical information
- Licensing authority: NTC
- Power: 5,000 watts

Links
- Webcast: juandertacurong.ismyradio.com
- Website: juanderradyo.com

DXCX (88.9 FM), broadcasting as 88.9 Juander Radyo, is a radio station owned and operated by Rizal Memorial Colleges Broadcasting Corporation and operated by RSV Broadcasting Network. Its studios and transmitter are located at the 2nd Floor., GHPDI Commercial Arcade, Alunan Hi-way., Brgy. Poblacion, Tacurong.

== History ==
On June 1, 2025, the station was relaunched as XFM Tacurong under Y2H Broadcasting Network. In June 2026, RSV Broadcasting Network took over the station's operations.

== Incidents ==
On October 30, 2019, station manager Benjie Caballero was shot outside his home by two gunmen on a motorcycle. He died a month later due to pneumonia.
