= Southern Christian College =

Location
- Kingston, Tasmania; Australia; 42°59′23″S 147°18′33″E

Information
- Type: Independent co-educational primary and secondary day school
- Denomination: Non-denominational Christian
- Established: 1986
- Sister school: SMA Muhammadiyah 1 Denpasar
- Principal: Jenny Mahoney
- Colours: Blue, Yellow, Red, Green
- Slogan: Inspiring Inquisitive Minds
- Affiliations: Christian Schools Australia; Independent Schools Tasmania; Sports Association of Tasmanian Independent Schools
- Website: www.scc.tas.edu.au

Southern Christian College is an independent non-denominational Christian co-educational primary and secondary day school located in Kingston, Tasmania providing education from kinder to year 12, as well as providing pre-school services as Kingston Early Learning Centre. Southern Christian College was founded in 1986. Since 2014 it has been an International Baccalaureate world school, teaching the IB PYP curriculum.

It is a ministry of CityLight Church, which is located on the same property. The school is a member of Christian Schools Australia and Independent Schools Tasmania. Until 2015 it taught kinder-year 10, when it received authorisation to start year 11 and 12 in 2016.
