= DXLL-FM =

Radio station in Davao City, Philippines

Max FM Davao (DXLL)
- Davao City; Philippines
- Broadcast area: Metro Davao and surrounding areas
- Frequency: 94.7 MHz
- Branding: 94.7 Max FM

Programming
- Languages: Cebuano, Filipino
- Format: Contemporary MOR, News, Talk
- Network: Max FM

Ownership
- Owner: Rizal Memorial Colleges Broadcasting Corporation
- Operator: Christian Media Management

History
- First air date: 1995
- Former names: Mellow Touch (1995–2014); One Radio (2014–2020); Power Radio (2021–2024)
- Call sign meaning: Luis and Leonida Vera (original owners)

Technical information
- Licensing authority: NTC
- Power: 10,000 watts
- ERP: 72,620 watts

DXLL (94.7 FM), broadcasting as 94.7 Max FM, is a radio station owned by Rizal Memorial Colleges Broadcasting Corporation and operated by Christian Media Management, a subsidiary of Laforteza Group of Companies. It serves as the flagship station of Max FM. The station's studio is located at the ground floor, MKI Inn Building, Sampaguita St. cor. McArthur Highway, Matina, Davao City, and its transmitter is located along Broadcast Ave., Shrine Hills, Matina, Davao City. This schedule operates daily from 5:00 am to 8:00 pm.

== History ==
The station was established in 1995 as Mellow Touch 94.7, owned by FBS Radio Network. It ceased operations in late 2006 due to poor management that led to bankruptcy. In June 2007, J-TvR Tri-Media Services took over management and reopened the station, but only operated it for a year due to lease contract disputes. In June 2008, management shifted to JKZ Adz Services. During this period, Ateneo de Davao University began airing a weekday morning block called Blue Knights FM.

In late January 2010, FBS resumed management after another conflict with a blocktime partner and relocated the station to Midland Village in Ma-a. The station retained its easy listening format, adding talk programs to attract more listeners.

In May 2014, RMC Broadcasting acquired the station, rebranding it as 94.7 One Radio with a news and music format. Studios moved to Door 1C, Anda Corporate Center along F. Inigo St. However, on December 2, 2014, the station, along with DXRA and most Radyo ni Juan stations, went off the air due to financial difficulties.

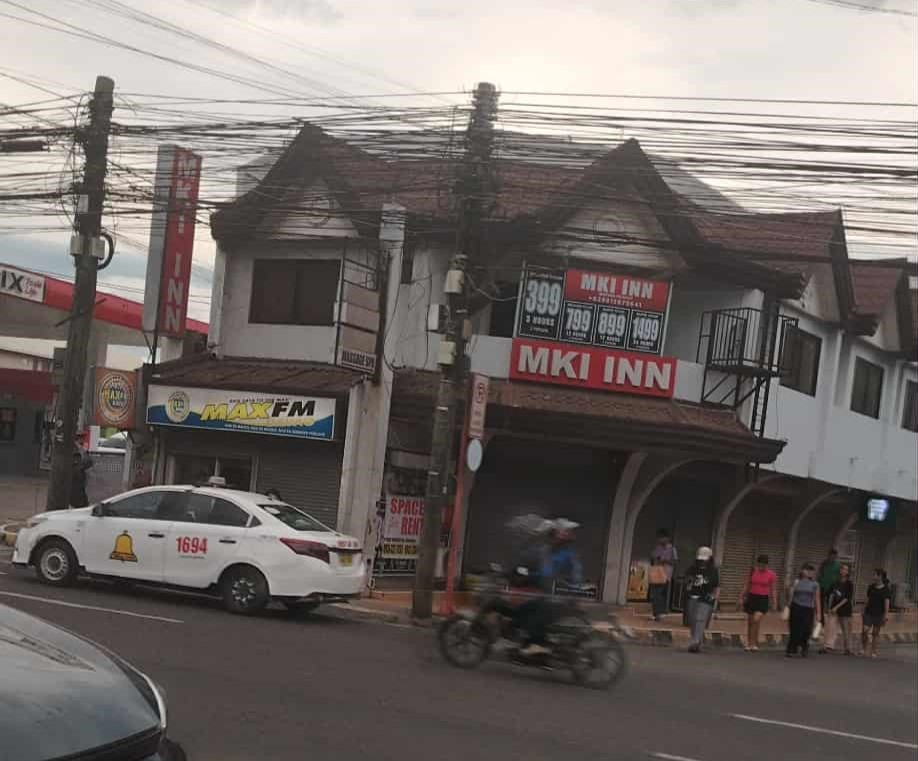
The station's studio at MKI INN Building at Mc. Arthur Highway.

By late January 2021, the station returned as 94.7 Power Radio under Christian Media Management, operating from its transmitter site in Shrine Hills.

On March 1, 2024, it rebranded once again as 94.7 Max FM and relocated to the MKI Inn Building in Matina.
