= DXQK =

Radio station in Koronadal, Philippines

Top Gun Radio (DXQK)
- Koronadal; Philippines
- Broadcast area: Northern South Cotabato, parts of Sultan Kudarat
- Frequency: 106.5 MHz
- Branding: 106.5 Top Gun Radio

Programming
- Languages: Hiligaynon, Filipino
- Format: Contemporary MOR, News, Talk

Ownership
- Owner: Rizal Memorial Colleges Broadcasting Corporation
- Operator: Zabala Mass Media Broadcasting Services

History
- First air date: October 28, 2018 (as Jack Radio); December 1, 2019 (as Top Gun Radio)
- Former frequencies: 90.5 MHz (2018–2019); 90.7 MHz (2019–2020)

Technical information
- Licensing authority: NTC
- Power: 5,000 watts
- ERP: 10,000 watts

106.5 Top Gun Radio (DXQK 106.5 MHz) is an FM station owned by Rizal Memorial Colleges Broadcasting Corporation and operated by Zabala Mass Media Broadcasting Services. Its studios and transmitters are located at Lower Aurora, corner Gensan Drive, Koronadal.

The station was formerly owned by Iddes Broadcast Group and operated by KAPA Media and Marketing Network. At that time, it was broadcasting as Jack Radio at 90.5 FM from October 28, 2018 to June 13, 2019, when it went off the air. It returned on air on August 19, 2019, this time without involvement of KAPA Media. In September 2019, the station went off the air again after Ryan Zabala, through Zabala Mass Media Broadcasting Services, acquired the station from Iddes.

On December 1, 2019, the station was launched as Top Gun Radio and relocated its frequency to 90.5 FM. Last August 1, 2020, the station went off the air after it was given a cease and desist order from the NTC Region 12 for broadcasting without a provisional authority. Prior to that, it was able to obtain a business permit from the local government.

On September 1, 2020, the station returned on air, this time on 106.5 FM.
