= DXSD =

Philippine radio station

Radyo Natin Isulan (DXSD)
- Isulan; Philippines
- Broadcast area: Northern Sultan Kudarat
- Frequency: 101.3 MHz
- Branding: 101.3 Radyo Natin

Programming
- Languages: Hiligaynon, Filipino
- Format: Community radio
- Network: Radyo Natin Network

Ownership
- Owner: MBC Media Group

History
- First air date: 1997

Technical information
- Licensing authority: NTC
- Power: 1,000 watts
- Repeater: Tacurong: DXRB 94.5 MHz

DXSD (101.3 FM), broadcasting as 101.3 Radyo Natin, is a radio station owned and operated by MBC Media Group. Its studios and transmitter are located along Zambrano St., Brgy. Kalawag 2, Isulan. It also has a relay transmitter in Biaca Subd., Brgy. Poblacion, Tacurong.
