= Albert Cheng (politician) =

Hong Kong radio host and politician (born 1946)

Albert J. Cheng GBS. RPE. P.Eng. FHKIE. JP
- 鄭經翰
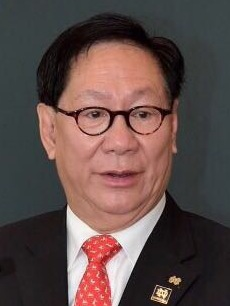

Member of the Legislative Council
- In office 30 September 2004 – 30 September 2008
- Preceded by: Szeto Wah
- Succeeded by: seat abolished
- Constituency: Kowloon East

Personal details
- Born: 3 July 1946 (age 80) Hong Kong
- Spouse(s): Paula Tsui (1974-1979) Irene Lo (m. 1987)
- Nickname(s): Taipan (大班), 十點前特首(CE before 10am)

Albert Cheng
- Traditional Chinese: 鄭經翰
- Simplified Chinese: 郑经翰
Transcriptions
Standard Mandarin
- Hanyu Pinyin: Zhèng Jīnghàn
Yue: Cantonese
- Jyutping: zeng6 ging1 hon6

Albert Cheng Jinghan (born 3 July 1946) is a professional engineer, Hong Kong current affair commentator, businessman, politician and a Fellow of The Hong Kong Institution of Engineers, past chairman and present Director of the Aircraft Division. He was appointed by HKSAR Government as Justice of the Peace (JP) in 2007 and he is awarded Gold Bauhinia Star (GBS) in 2010. He was named as one of the Time's 25 Most Influential Person in 1997 Hong Kong by Times Magazine and he also named as one of 50 Asia Star in 1998 by Newsweek Magazine. He is now residing in Canada.

== Early life and activities in Canada ==
Cheng has family roots from Chaozhou, Guangdong. He born in Hong Kong and received his education in Hong Kong. Starting as an aircraft maintenance apprentice, he subsequently qualified as an aircraft maintenance engineer in Canada in 1969. He became a Canadian citizen four years later.

He was a delegate to the First Chinese Canadian National Conference in 1975. The same year, he served as secretary to the Immigration Policy Action Committee and co-chairman of the National Committee to Save Chinese Barbeque Products. In 1976, he became a founding member of the Vancouver Chinese Cultural Centre. Cheng coordinated a series of cultural activities in the 1970s, including the Chinatown events for the United Nations' Habitat Vancouver Festival and the Shanghai Ballet national tour in Canada under the auspices of the Canada Council led by the Secretary of State of the federal government. From 1977 to 1979, he was a board member of the Vancouver Strathcona Community Center. He is the founding president of the Chinese Canadian Association of Hong Kong, which was established in 1988. Cheng was granted the Vancouver Community Award in 1978 in recognition of his cultural integrity and contribution especially to the Canadian Chinese community.

Cheng is the founder and founding president of the Chinese Canadian Association in Hong Kong.

== Entrepreneurship ==
In 1981, Cheng left the aviation industry and became an independent market consultant. In 1983, Cheng was lured by the chairwoman of Sing Tao Holdings, Sally Aw Sian, to return to Hong Kong to spearhead the Group's advertising, marketing and business development initiatives. He left the company in 1985.

After consulting for a Sino-Canadian joint venture on the tender for a Light Rail Transit system project, Cheng established Capital Communications Corporation in 1986 to publish the Chinese editions of international titles, such as the Capital, Playboy and Forbes magazines, Chinese edition. The company was merged with Paramount Publishing Group in 1991 (a public listed company) to become the largest publishing and printing house in the region. In 1991, Capital Communications Corporation was acquired by Paramount Publishing Group, with Cheng becoming CEO, a position he held until 1994. His entrepreneurship earned him the nickname "Taipan".

Cheng was appointed as consultant for a wide spectrum of key institutions in Hong Kong, including the Land Development Council, Mass Transit Railway Corporation, Hong Kong Jockey Club, Trade Development Council, PCCW, Futures and Security Commission and Hong Kong Stock Exchange.

Cheng was a board member of the Hong Kong Audit Bureau of Circulation (HKABC). He also served as board member, treasurer, chairman of the Society of Hong Kong Publishers from 1988 to 1990. He has been served as a trustee of the Foundation of Businesses in Support of the Arts since 1990.

He was a member of the Securities & Futures Commission's Public Shareholders Group. Cheng also led the Hong Kong Expo' 97 Initiative Committee in 1988.

In 1999, Cheng took advantage of the dot-com boom to set up 36.com Holdings Ltd. 36.com later ventured into publishing the weekly Cup magazine. Cheng remains publisher emeritus of the now monthly Cup magazine.

== Political activism ==
Cheng is a co-founder of The Hong Kong Alliance in Support of the Democratic Movements of China, which was established during the 1989 Tiananmen Square Protests.

Cheng formed the Right of Abode Delegation, with Hong Kong leading businessmen to press London for full British passports for Hong Kong people as a political insurance policy. The campaign resulted in right of abode in Britain for some 50,000 Hong Kong people.

As an activist, he was participated in mobilising mass opposition in 2002 to the Hong Kong Government's Central and Wan Chai Reclamation Project. He was behind a judicial review that resulted in stopping the reclamation in Central.

== Media personality ==
In 1994, Cheng co-hosted the ground-breaking political talk show "News Tease" on Asia Television which set the trend of current affairs commentary programmes in the local electronic media. He was under pressure to leave the business sector because of his candid political remarks. Apart from ATV, he also hosted current affairs talk shows on Cable TV and Now TV.

A year later, he left Paramount Publishing Group and Capital Communications to become a full-time host of Commercial Radio's breakfast talk-back show Teacup in a Storm. He spoke for the social underdogs and pressed the authorities into action on matters of public concern.

In addition despite his absence from Canada, Cheng has doubled up as a commentator for Overseas Chinese Voice (AM 1320 CHMB), a multicultural radio station in Vancouver. His commentaries were syndicated across overseas Chinese-speaking communities in North America and Australia. He ended his radio show on AM1320 on 30 August 2019.

In print, Cheng had been a columnist for the Ming Pao Weekly, Hong Kong Economic Journal and South China Morning Post since 1999.

=== 1998 assault ===
On 19 August 1998, Cheng was ambushed by two knife-wielding assailants and sustained serious injuries outside the radio station before he was scheduled to air. He was struck on his back, arms and right leg for a total of six times, leaving deep wounds up to 22 cm long. He was brought to intensive care where he underwent four and a half hours of surgery to reattach his broken bones, flesh and nerves. Despite the police offering a potential HK$500,000 reward, no arrests were made and the motive for the attack remains unknown. The attack shocked Hong Kong society and raised concerns about freedom of speech in the former British colony, one year after the handover to China at the time.

Premier Glen Clark of British Columbia visited him in the hospital during his official visit to Hong Kong. The same year, Premier Clark introduced him to the BC assembly, where he was recognised. Cheng returned to host Teacup in a Storm later in the year.

Despite his vast popularity, Cheng's contract with Commercial Radio was terminated abruptly and unilaterally in 2004 as the station buckled under political pressure in the run-up to the renewal of its broadcasting license.

== Legislative career ==
After Commercial Radio had dismissed him under political pressure, Cheng decided to run for a place in the legislature. He gave up his Canadian citizenship in 2004 to comply with local election requirements for direct elections to the Legislative Council of Hong Kong.

He won a seat in the Legislative Council and tackled vital issues such as the opening up of the public airwaves, imposing tighter tobacco control, introducing food labelling, and regulating against unscrupulous practices in the sales of residential flats.

Cheng was opposed to the privatisation of the government's shopping malls and car parks in its public housing estates. He was concerned that the ill-considered move would undermine the interests of the low-income public housing tenants, especially the elderly ones. He strived in vain to stop the related listing of the Link REIT on the Hong Kong Stock Exchange in 2005.

Cheng was appointed by the Chief Executive of the HKSAR for four years to serve on the Independent Police Complaints Commission, which is tasked with monitoring the review by the Complaints Against Police Office of complaints against members of the Police Force. And he also served as a member of the Film Development Council. During his appointment at the IPCC Cheng served as the Chairman of the Publicity Committee.During his legislative tenure Cheng chaired the Panel on Information Technology and Broadcasting of the law-making body and promoted an "open sky" policy for the electronic media. He also sit on two standing committee included the Public Account Committee and Member Interest Committee.

== Digital radio proprietorship ==
In 2008, Cheng announced that he would not seek re-election to Legco to avoid possible conflict of interests in his efforts to apply for a license to operate a radio station. His Wave Media was awarded a license in 2009 to prepare for Hong Kong's first Digital Audio Broadcast service, under the banner of Digital Broadcasting Corporation (DBC).

He ran into a major argument with other shareholders as he insisted on an independent editorial policy that is critical of government failings. He founded D100 Radio, an online multimedia operation, after leaving his role as DBC chairman.

== Charity and community service ==
Cheng is a voting member of the Hong Kong Jockey Club, the first Asian charity donor to be listed in the world's top 10.

He also sat on another major charity in Hong Kong, the Community Chest. He was a member of the Public Relations Committee and Corporate & Employee Contribution Programme Organizing Committee of the Community Chest, which is a statutory body functioning as an umbrella organisation to provide grants to a wide range of community projects.

In 1996, the Senior Citizen Home Safety Association (SCHSA) was founded by Albert Cheng, Dr. C.K. Law (GBS, JP), and a group of individuals, in response to a prolonged cold spell during which more than one hundred elderly living alone were found dead. The association is a self-financing social enterprise and charitable organization in Hong Kong that offers 24-hour personal caring and emergency assistance services to the elderly and others. The Association was recognised by United Nation as an outstanding innovative organisation.

From 2003 to 2004, Cheng served as a member of the Securities & Futures Commission Public Shareholders Group to advise on issues relating to safeguarding shareholders' rights and interests.

Cheng was chairman of the second Hong Kong Film Awards Organizing Committee in 1984. He was a member of the Hong Kong Film Development Council from 2011 to 2013 to advise the Secretary for Commerce and Economic Development on relevant policies and activities, including manpower training, Mainland and overseas promotion, and support for the film industry.

== Academic service ==
Cheng acts as Asia adviser to the Provost and responsible for establishing the Greater China Scholarship of the University of Notre Dame. He was on the board of Hong Kong Shue Yan University's academic advisory board and curriculum vetting committee.

He was a governor and honorary development director of the English Schools Foundation (ESF), the biggest international educational foundation in Asia which runs 22 educational institutions mostly international schools in Hong Kong.

Cheng was also a vetting committee member for the digital media courses of the Vocational Training Council, the largest vocational and professional education and training provider serving 250,000 students a year in Hong Kong.

He was honorary vice-president of the Economic & Finance Society of the University of Hong Kong, and honorary advisor of the Society of Business Administration of the Chinese University of Hong Kong.

== Personal life ==
Cheng married Cantopop singer Paula Tsui in Canada in 1974. They divorced five years later. In 1987, he married Irene Lo Kam-seung, Miss Hong Kong pageant winner of 1981, with whom he has three sons. He resettled in Vancouver in 2019.

== See also ==
- Joel Delacy, colleague and first aider for 1998 incident

Legislative Council of Hong Kong
Preceded by Szeto Wah	Member of Legislative Council; Representative for Kowloon East; 2004–2008	Lost seat to Kowloon West
