= T Radio Pigcawayan =

Pigcawayan; Philippines
- Broadcast area: Northern Maguindanao, Western Cotabato
- Frequency: 96.7 MHz
- Branding: 96.7 T Radio

Programming
- Format: Contemporary MOR, OPM

Ownership
- Owner: ELT ADZ and Communication Services

History
- First air date: 2016; 10 years ago

Technical information
- Licensing authority: NTC
- Power: 5,000 watts

96.7 T Radio is an FM station owned and operated by ELT ADZ and Communication Services. The station's studio is located at Brgy. Poblacion I, Pigcawayan.

== ELT ADZ and Communication Services ==
Branding	Frequency	Power	Location
T Radio Tagum	96.9 MHz	5 kW	Tagum
T Radio Mati	96.7 MHz	5 kW	Mati
T Radio Surallah	88.1 MHz	5 kW	Surallah
T Radio Valencia	93.7 MHz	5 kW	Valencia
T Radio Kidapawan	100.7 MHz	5 kW	Kidapawan
T Radio Pigcawayan	96.7 MHz	5 kW	Pigcawayan
