= Rizal Memorial Colleges Broadcasting Corporation =

Philippine radio network

- Type: Private
- Industry: Broadcast
- Founded: 1966
- Headquarters: Davao City, Philippines
- Key people: Mario Solis President & CEO
- Owner: Rizal Memorial Colleges
- Website: rmcdavao.com

Rizal Memorial Colleges Broadcasting Corporation (RMCBC) is a Philippine radio network. Its main headquarters is located at Door 1C, Anda Corporate Center, F. Inigo St., Davao City. RMCBC operates a number of stations across places in Mindanao and Visayas.

== Radyo ni Juan ==
Radyo ni Juan was the flagship network of RMCBC from 2012 to 2020, a couple of months after its founder Dodong Solis died.

== RMCBC stations ==
=== FM stations ===
Max FM

The following stations are operated by Christian Media Management.

Branding	Callsign	Frequency	Location
Max FM Davao	DXLL	94.7 MHz	Davao City
Max FM Malita	DXED	88.5 MHz	Malita
Max FM Midsayap	DXDN	103.3 MHz	Midsayap

XFM

The following stations are operated by Y2H Broadcasting Network.

Branding	Callsign	Frequency	Location
XFM Bukidnon	DXQE	101.7 MHz	Malaybalay
XFM Agusan del Sur	DXCV	91.3 MHz	San Francisco
XFM General Santos	DXPF	95.9 MHz	General Santos
XFM Pagadian	DXPX	89.5 MHz	Pagadian

Juander Radyo

The following stations are operated by RSV Broadcasting Network.

Branding	Callsign	Frequency	Location
Juander Radyo Surigao	DXRN	97.3 MHz	Surigao City
Juander Radyo Nabunturan	DXBZ	88.5 MHz	Nabunturan
Juander Radyo Tagum	DXDE	100.7 MHz	Tagum
Juander Radyo Tacurong	DXCX	88.9 MHz	Tacurong
Juander Radyo Gingoog	DXOG	99.3 MHz	Gingoog
Juander Radyo Cotabato	DXDO	102.1 MHz	Cotabato City
Juander Radyo Zamboanga	DXZV	105.1 MHz	Zamboanga City
Juander Radyo Cebu	DYVL	94.1 MHz	Bogo
Juander Radyo San Carlos	—N/a	100.5 MHz	San Carlos

Nonglading Radio

The following stations are operated by Nonglading Broadcasting Services.

Branding	Callsign	Frequency	Location
Nonglading Radio Kidapawan	DXKM	107.9 MHz	Kidapawan
Nonglading Radio Digos	DXJC	99.1 MHz	Digos
Nonglading Radio Trento	—N/a	102.3 MHz	Trento

Other brands

Branding	Callsign	Frequency	Location	Operator
K5 News FM Antique	DYBZ	95.7 MHz	San Jose	5K Broadcasting Network
K5 News FM Siaton	DYSW	94.5 MHz	Siaton	5K Broadcasting Network
Nice Radio	DYLN	101.7 MHz	Naval	—N/a
The Edge	DXDZ	92.9 MHz	Iligan	Alemania Group of Companies
Angle Radio	DXDC	103.7 MHz	Don Carlos	—N/a
Nature's FM Tandag	DXTV	103.9 MHz	Tandag	RSV Broadcasting Network
Nature's FM Mati	DXNZ	88.5 MHz	Mati	RSV Broadcasting Network
LCM FM Davao	DXMW	99.3 MHz	Mawab	Loud Cry Ministries
Top Gun Radio	DXQK	106.5 MHz	Koronadal	Zabala Mass Media Broadcasting Services

=== Former stations ===
Callsign	Frequency	Location	Status
DXRA	783 kHz	Davao City	Off the air in December 2020.
DXBV	99.7 MHz	Digos	Acquired by Malindang Broadcasting Network Corporation.
