= DXJC =

Radio station in Digos, Philippines

Nonglading Radio Digos (DXJC)
- Digos; Philippines
- Broadcast area: Davao del Sur, parts of Davao City
- Frequency: 99.1 MHz
- Branding: 99.1 Nonglading Radio

Programming
- Languages: Cebuano, Filipino
- Format: Contemporary MOR, News, Talk
- Network: Nonglading Radio

Ownership
- Owner: Rizal Memorial Colleges Broadcasting Corporation
- Operator: Nonglading Broadcasting Services

History
- First air date: 2013
- Former names: Radyo ni Juan (2013-2020); Max FM (2022-2025)

Technical information
- Licensing authority: NTC
- Power: 5 kW

99.1 Nonglading Radio (DXJC 99.1 MHz) is an FM station owned by Rizal Memorial Colleges Broadcasting Corporation and operated by Nonglading Broadcasting Services. Its studios and transmitter are located at 2nd Floor CPP Bldg., Rizal Ave., Brgy. Zone 1, Digos.
