= Kiamba, Sarangani =

Municipality in Sarangani, Philippines

Kiamba
- Municipality

Other transcription(s)
  - Jawi: كيامب
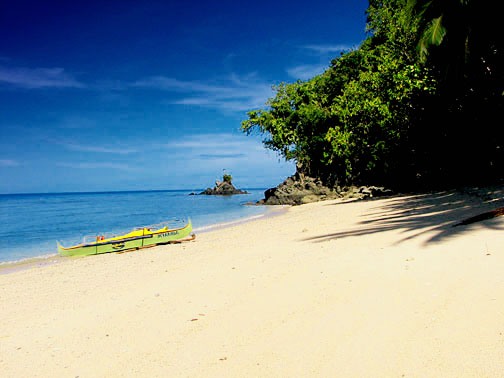
- Tuka Beach

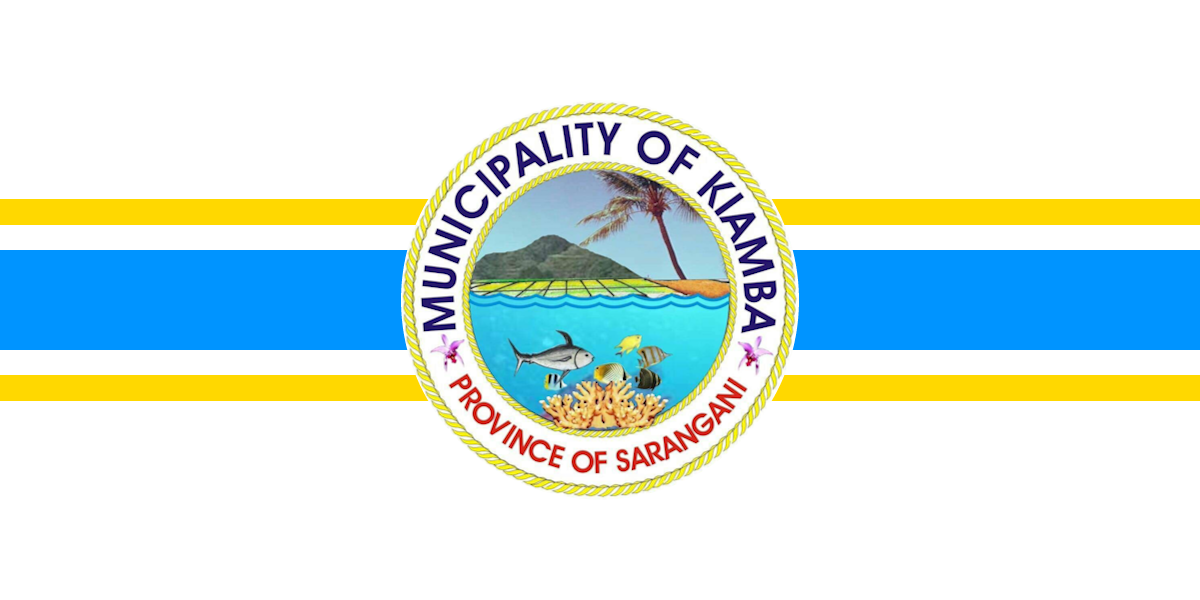
- Flag Seal

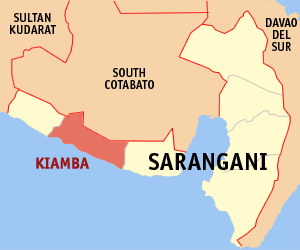
- Map of Sarangani with Kiamba highlighted
- Interactive map of Kiamba
- Location within the Philippines
- Coordinates: 5°59′28″N 124°37′32″E
- Country: Philippines
- Region: Soccsksargen
- Province: Sarangani
- District: Lone district
- Founded: August 18, 1947
- Barangays: 19 (see Barangays)

Government
  - Type: Sangguniang Bayan
  - Mayor: George F. Falgui
  - Vice Mayor: Marie Jess M. Ancheta
  - Representative: Steve Solon
  - Municipal Council: Members: James Solomon F. Pimentel; Josephine L. Dalman; Cornelio C. Martinez Jr.; Ruben T. Sevilleja; Jeric G. Santillana; Antonio A. Yasaña; Vincent Wyne J. Gagarin; Alfredo A. Maglin Jr.
  - Electorate: 40,377 voters (2025)

Area
  - Total: 328.68 km^{2} (126.90 sq mi)
- Elevation: 73 m (240 ft)
- Highest elevation: 661 m (2,169 ft)
- Lowest elevation: 0 m (0 ft)

Population (2024 census)
  - Total: 68,745
  - Density: 209.15/km^{2} (541.71/sq mi)
  - Households: 15,420

Economy
  - Income class: 1st municipal income class
  - Poverty incidence: 26.24% (2023)
  - Revenue: ₱ 339.5 million (2024)
  - Assets: ₱ 890.1 million (2024)
  - Expenditure: ₱ 275.8 million (2024)
  - Liabilities: ₱ 271.6 million (2024)

Service provider
  - Electricity: South Cotabato 2 Electric Cooperative (SOCOTECO 2)
- Time zone: UTC+8 (PST)
- ZIP code: 9514
- PSGC: 1208003000
- IDD : area code: +63 (0)83
- Native languages: Cebuano; Tboli; Maguindanao; Blaan; Tagalog
- Website: kiamba.url.ph

Kiamba, officially the Municipality of Kiamba (Note: Blaan: Banwé Kiambà Sinugboanon: Lungsod sa Kiamba Mëgindënëwn: Inged nu Kiamba Tboli: Benwu Kiambà Tagakolu: Lunsud na Ki͡amba Hiligaynon: Banwa sang Kiamba Ilokano: Ili ti Kiamba Filipino: Munisipalidad ng Kiamba), is a municipality in the province of Sarangani, Philippines. According to the 2024 census, it has a population of 68,745 people.

It is bordered on the west by Maitum, on the east by Maasim, on the north by South Cotabato, and on the south by the Celebes Sea.

Notable residents include Manny Pacquiao. It is the hometown of his wife Jinkee Pacquiao.

== History ==
The area of what is now known as MAKIMA was first inhabited by T'boli tribes people who mostly occupied the highlands. The lowlands and plains were mostly occupied by Maguindanaons especially Sultanate of Maguindanao then Sultanate of Buayan and the Sangil people who mostly are from Balut and Sangili islands, occupied the areas near the sea. The Ilocanos who are originally from Luzon only came to the area around 1920's onwards as they heed the government's homesteading and resettlement plan. Visayans later followed.

The municipality was formed on August 18, 1947, when Executive Order No. 82 was signed by the government by merging the municipal districts of Kraan and Kling.

Maitum on the west became an independent municipality in 1959. In 1971, Maasim on the east also became an independent municipality.

== Geography ==
=== Barangays ===
Kiamba is politically subdivided into 19 barangays. Each barangay consists of puroks while some have sitios.

- Badtasan
- Datu Dani
- Gasi
- Kapate
- Katubao
- Kayupo
- Kling (Lumit)
- Lagundi
- Lebe
- Lomuyon
- Luma
- Maligang
- Nalus
- Poblacion
- Salakit
- Suli
- Tablao
- Tamadang
- Tambilil

=== Climate ===
Climate data for Kiamba, Sarangani
| Month | Jan | Feb | Mar | Apr | May | Jun | Jul | Aug | Sep | Oct | Nov | Dec | Year |
|---|---|---|---|---|---|---|---|---|---|---|---|---|---|
| Mean daily maximum °C (°F) | 30 (86) | 30 (86) | 31 (88) | 31 (88) | 30 (86) | 29 (84) | 29 (84) | 29 (84) | 30 (86) | 30 (86) | 29 (84) | 30 (86) | 30 (86) |
| Mean daily minimum °C (°F) | 23 (73) | 23 (73) | 24 (75) | 24 (75) | 25 (77) | 24 (75) | 24 (75) | 24 (75) | 24 (75) | 24 (75) | 24 (75) | 24 (75) | 24 (75) |
| Average precipitation mm (inches) | 193 (7.6) | 177 (7.0) | 222 (8.7) | 222 (8.7) | 278 (10.9) | 292 (11.5) | 245 (9.6) | 222 (8.7) | 174 (6.9) | 193 (7.6) | 245 (9.6) | 233 (9.2) | 2,696 (106) |
| Average rainy days | 24.6 | 22.1 | 25.7 | 26.3 | 28.4 | 27.2 | 25.9 | 25.2 | 22.3 | 25.9 | 27.3 | 26.9 | 307.8 |
Source: Meteoblue

== Demographics ==
Population census of Kiamba
| Year | Pop. | ±% p.a. |
|---|---|---|
| 1918 | 12,734 | — |
| 1939 | 14,687 | +0.68% |
| 1948 | 15,824 | +0.83% |
| 1960 | 32,358 | +6.14% |
| 1970 | 21,424 | −4.03% |
| 1975 | 21,986 | +0.52% |
| 1980 | 28,467 | +5.30% |
| 1990 | 35,418 | +2.21% |
| 1995 | 39,717 | +2.17% |
| 2000 | 44,724 | +2.58% |
| 2007 | 53,040 | +2.38% |
| 2010 | 54,871 | +1.24% |
| 2015 | 61,058 | +2.06% |
| 2020 | 65,774 | +1.58% |
| 2024 | 68,745 | +1.07% |
Source: Philippine Statistics Authority

The majority of the population speak Cebuano, although early settlers were of Ilocano origin, as a result of assimilation into the majority Cebuano-speaking society due to the huge influx of migrants from Cebu, Bohol, Siquijor, and other Cebuano-speaking parts of Mindanao residing in the area over the years. There are a lot of Moro people (Sangil and Maguindanaon) who settles in the area long before the Christians from Luzon (and later Visayas) came. One of the indigenous peoples living in mountainous areas of Kiamba is known as T'boli.

== Economy ==
Poverty incidence of Kiamba (%)

Source: Philippine Statistics Authority

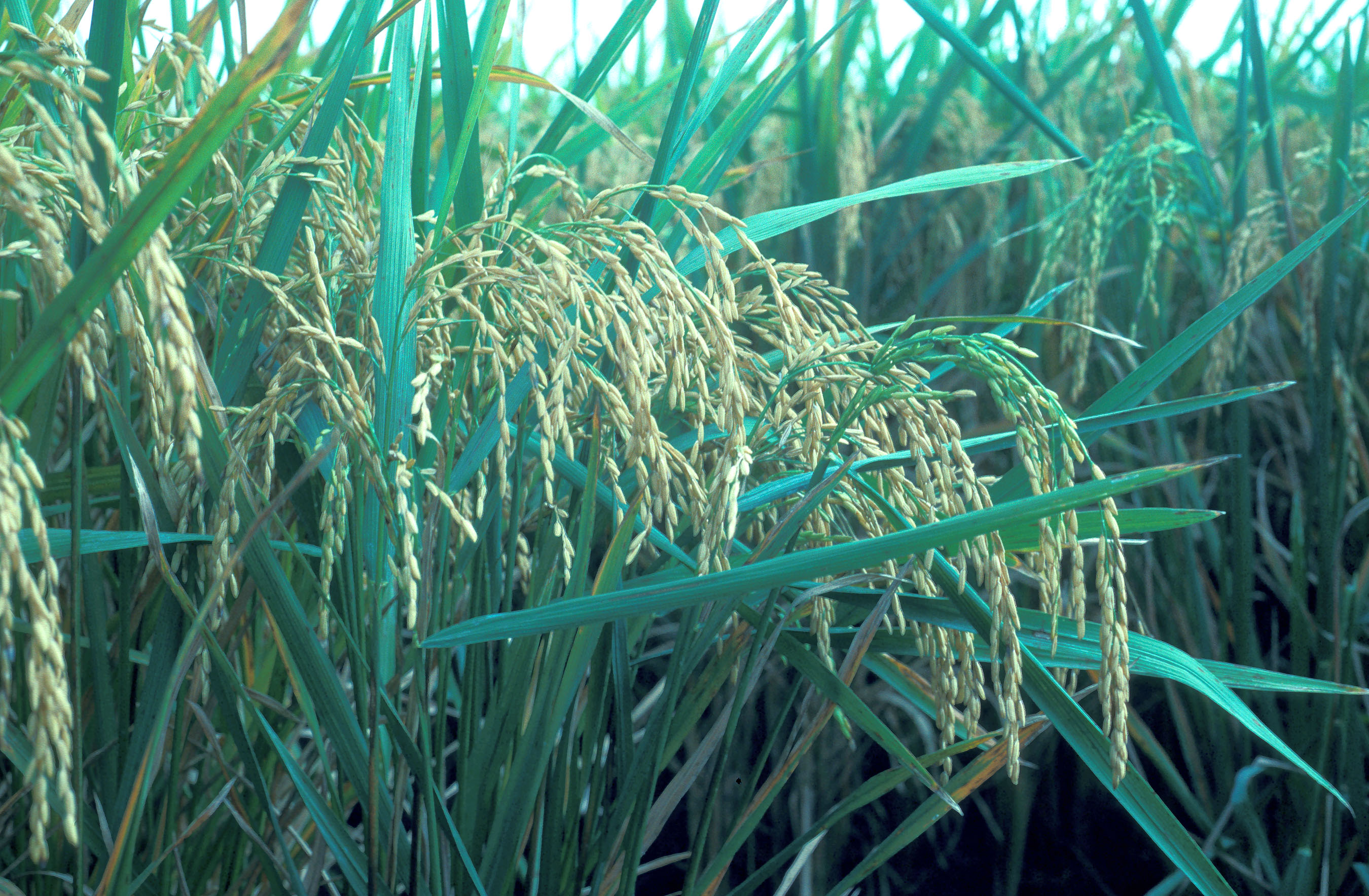
Rice, the foremost income producer.

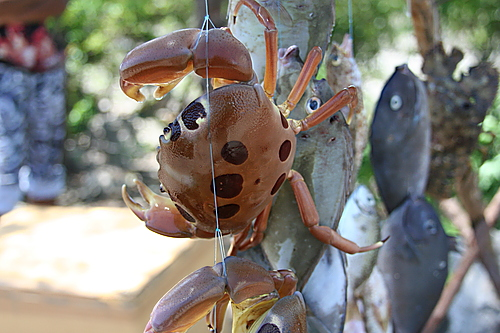
Seafoods, the second biggest income earner.

The economy of Kiamba is largely based on agriculture with vast ricefields surrounding the municipality. Aqua-culture is the second biggest income earner, notably the culture of milkfish and shrimps (locally called "sugpo" or "lukon") for export. Also, coastal communities depend on deep-sea fishing as a primary livelihood.

== Tourism ==
Various attractions include:

- The Timpuyog festival celebrates the town's foundation anniversary. Timpuyog is an Ilocano word for unity, and the festival includes tribal shows and a carnival. Kiamba celebrates the Timpuyog Festival and Foundation Anniversary every February 14.
- Tuka Marine Park, a protected area where fishing is banned. It has four protected coves and only one (Tuka 2) is open to the public. The site has coral formations.
- Short, narrow roads lined with Japanese era houses
- Waterfalls in lush rainforests (ex. Nalus Falls)
- Beaches of Kiamba (ex. Wakap Beach in Datu Dani)
- Cockfights

== References in Media ==
Kiamba was the setting of the final, climactic segment of the action-adventure film Uncharted, being the supposed hiding spot of Magellan's lost treasure.

== Education ==
- Kiamba National High School
- Notre Dame of Kiamba
- Southern Cotabato Academy
- J.B.T. Caing Sr. Memorial Integrated School
- James L. Chiongbian National Trade School (Formerly Kling National High school)
- Cabales-Enarbia Integrated School
- Salakit National High School
- Goldenstate College of Kiamba
- Euro Asia College of Technology Incorporated

== Media ==
=== FM Stations ===
- 88.9 DABIG C Radio (Prime Broadcasting Network)
- 100.5 Muews Radio (Sagay Broadcasting Corporation)
- 101.3 Radyo Natin (Manila Broadcasting Company/Radyo Natin Network)
- 104.9 Brigada News FM (Brigada Mass Media Corporation)

=== Cable and Satellite TV ===
- Kiamba Cable TV Service Cooperative
- Sarangani Cable Corporation
