= DXPF =

XFM General Santos (DXPF)
- General Santos; Philippines
- Broadcast area: South Cotabato, Sarangani and surrounding areas
- Frequency: 95.9 MHz
- Branding: 95.9 XFM

Programming
- Languages: Cebuano, Filipino
- Format: Contemporary MOR, News, Talk
- Network: XFM

Ownership
- Owner: Rizal Memorial Colleges Broadcasting Corporation
- Operator: Y2H Broadcasting Network
- Sister stations: 104.7 Solid FM

History
- First air date: 2023
- Former call signs: DXXR
- Former frequencies: 104.7 MHz (2023-June 2024)

Technical information
- Licensing authority: NTC
- Power: 10 Kw
- ERP: 15 Kw

95.9 XFM (DXPF 95.9 MHz) is an FM station owned by Rizal Memorial Colleges Broadcasting Corporation and operated by Y2H Broadcasting Network. Its studio and transmitter are located at 2nd Floor Authentic Bldg., Dacera Ave., corner Nuñez, Brgy. San Isidro, General Santos. The frequency is formerly owned by Interactive Broadcast Media and was licensed to Polomolok prior to RMCBC's acquisition of the frequency in 2020.
