= DXKM (Kidapawan) =

Nonglading Radio (DXKM)
- Kidapawan; Philippines
- Broadcast area: Eastern Cotabato and surrounding areas
- Frequency: 107.9 MHz
- Branding: 107.9 Nonglading Radio

Programming
- Languages: Cebuano, Filipino
- Format: Contemporary MOR, News, Talk

Ownership
- Owner: Rizal Memorial Colleges Broadcasting Corporation
- Operator: Nonglading Broadcasting Services

History
- First air date: April 2015
- Former names: Radyo ni Juan (April 2015-December 2020); Power Radio (February 2022-September 2023); Right Radio (October 2023-June 2025)

Technical information
- Licensing authority: NTC
- Power: 5 kW

107.9 Nonglading Radio (DXKM 107.9 MHz) is an FM station owned by Rizal Memorial Colleges Broadcasting Corporation and operated by Nonglading Broadcasting Services. Its studios and transmitter are located in Brgy. Sudapin, Kidapawan.
