= DXDN-FM =

Max FM Midsayap
Midsayap; Philippines
- Broadcast area: Cotabato
- Frequency: 103.3 MHz
- Branding: 103.3 Max FM

Programming
- Languages: Filipino, Cebuano
- Format: Contemporary MOR, News, Talk
- Network: Max FM

Ownership
- Owner: Rizal Memorial Colleges Broadcasting Corporation
- Operator: Christian Media Management

History
- First air date: February 18, 2012 (as Kiss FM); May 17, 2021 (as Max FM)

Technical information
- Licensing authority: NTC
- Power: 5 kW

103.3 Max FM (DXDN 103.3 MHz) is a Philippinan FM station owned by Rizal Memorial Colleges Broadcasting Corporation and operated by Christian Media Management. Its studios and transmitter are located at Brgy. Poblacion 1, Midsayap.
