= Maasim =

Municipality in Sarangani, Philippines

- Municipality

Other transcription(s)
  - Jawi: ماسم
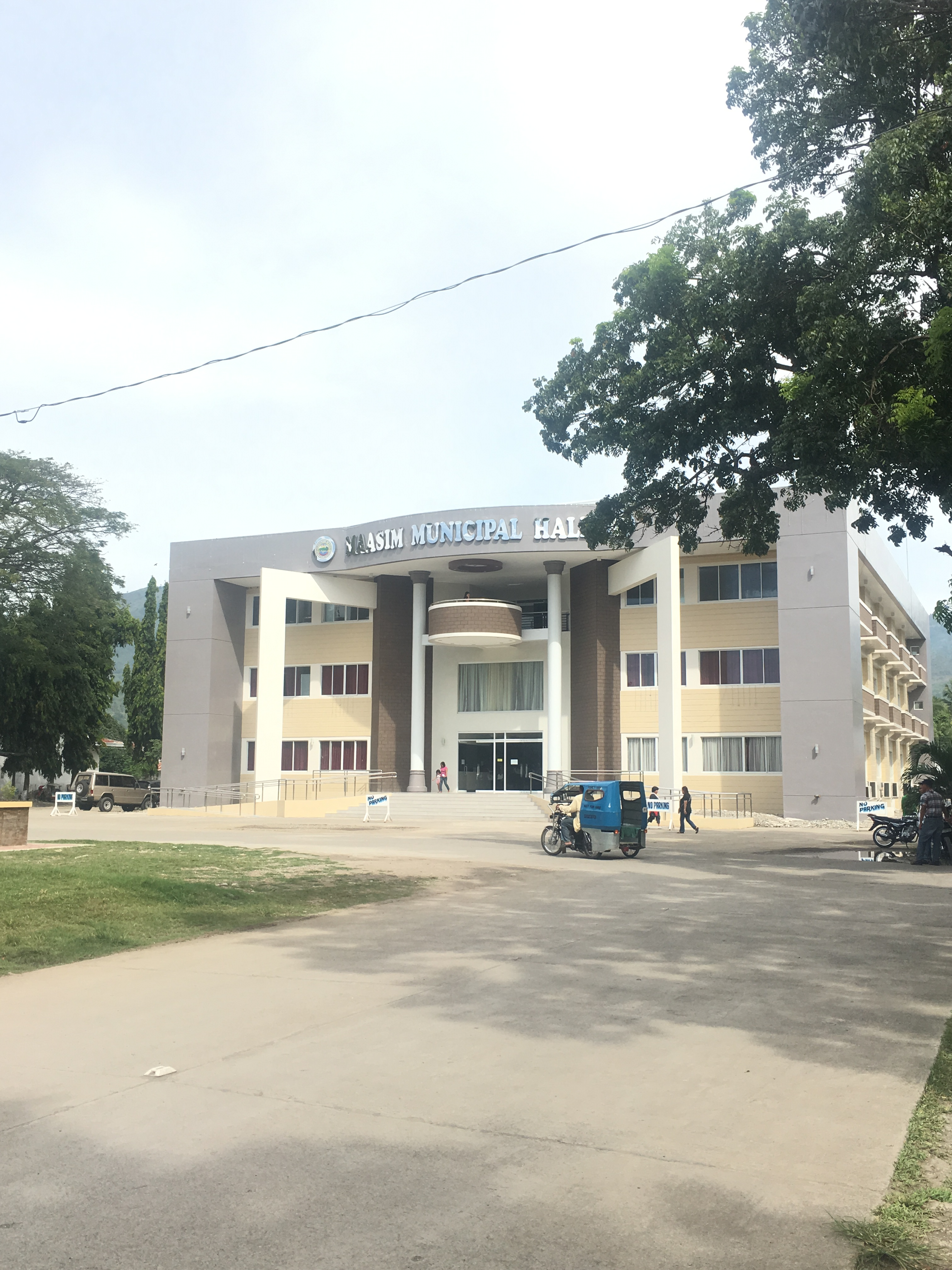
- Municipal Hall of Maasim

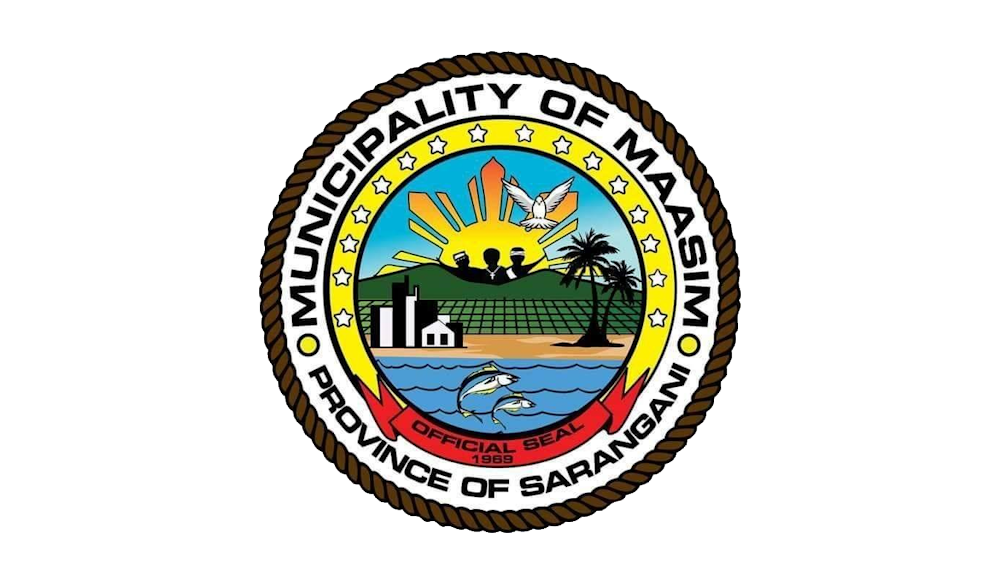
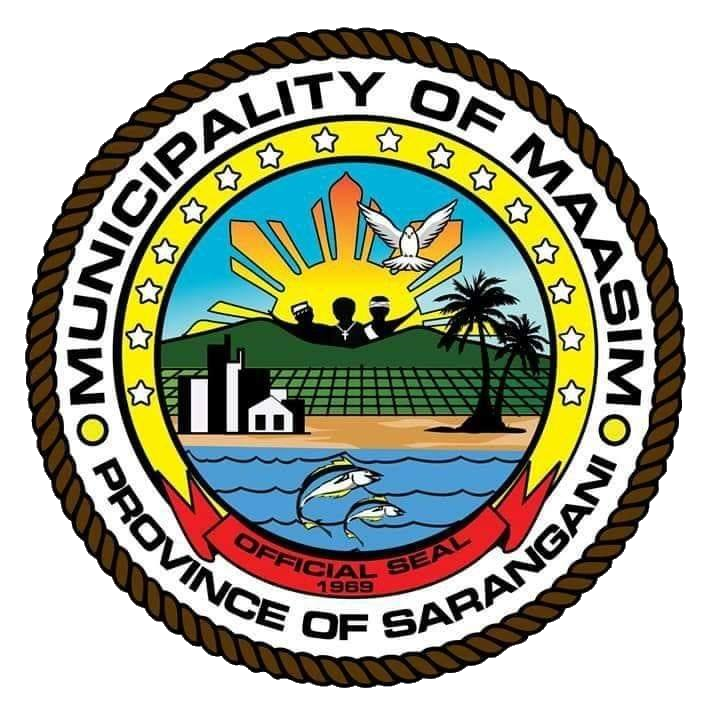
- Flag Seal

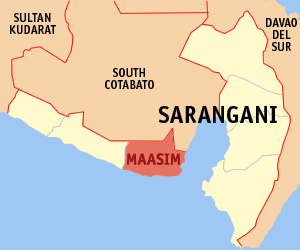
- Map of Sarangani with Maasim highlighted
- Interactive map of Maasim
- Location within the Philippines
- Coordinates: 5°56′N 124°58′E
- Country: Philippines
- Region: Soccsksargen
- Province: Sarangani
- District: Lone district
- Barangays: 16 (see Barangays)

Government
  - Type: Sangguniang Bayan
  - Mayor: Zyrex C. Pacquiao
  - Vice Mayor: Visitacion S. Nambatac
  - Representative: Steve Solon
  - Municipal Council: Members: Aldwin Z. Labongan; Fortunato F. Albores Jr.; Zenaida T. Gomez; Marlon G. Macabangon; Margarito L. Lanticse II; Francisco C. Carnalna; Emelita C. Pelipas; Aldrick O. Ambrad
  - Electorate: 43,839 voters (2025)

Area
  - Total: 500.43 km^{2} (193.22 sq mi)
- Elevation: 136 m (446 ft)
- Highest elevation: 740 m (2,430 ft)
- Lowest elevation: 0 m (0 ft)

Population (2024 census)
  - Total: 67,907
  - Density: 135.70/km^{2} (351.45/sq mi)
  - Households: 15,038

Economy
  - Income class: 1st municipal income class
  - Poverty incidence: 30.25% (2023)
  - Revenue: ₱ 459.6 million (2024)
  - Assets: ₱ 789.9 million (2024)
  - Expenditure: ₱ 382.6 million (2024)
  - Liabilities: ₱ 195.1 million (2024)

Service provider
  - Electricity: South Cotabato 2 Electric Cooperative (SOCOTECO 2)
- Time zone: UTC+8 (PST)
- ZIP code: 9502
- PSGC: 1208004000
- IDD : area code: +63 (0)83
- Native languages: Cebuano; Tboli; Maguindanao; Blaan; Tagalog
- Website: www.maasim.gov.ph

Maasim, officially the Municipality of Maasim (Note: Blaan: Banwé Maasim Sinugboanon: Lungsod sa Maasim Mëgindënëwn: Inged nu Maasim Tboli: Benwu Maasim Tagakolu: Lunsud na Ma-asim Hiligaynon: Banwa sang Maasim Ilokano: Ili ti Maasim Filipino: Munisipalidad ng Maasim), is a municipality in the province of Sarangani, Philippines. According to 2024 census, it had a population of 67,907 people.

== History ==
Maasim was first created as a municipality of the then-undivided Cotabato through Executive Order No. 113, signed by President Diosdado Macapagal on October 1, 1964, consisting of 20 barrios of Kiamba and 2 sitios of then-municipality of General Santos; with the seat of government being designated at Barrio Maasim. However, its creation, among others, was declared void ab initio by the Supreme Court in its decision dated December 24, 1965.

It was eventually recreated through Republic Act No. 5866, enacted without executive approval on June 21, 1969, which constituted the same entities. At that time, both Kiamba and General Santos (having been converted into a city) had been included in the separate province of South Cotabato. Maasim, Kiamba, and five other municipalities of South Cotabato ultimately became part of Sarangani upon its establishment in 1992.

On September 9, 2026, several parcels of land at Barangay Malbang, with a total area of 142,569 square meters, was designated as a Special Economic Zones, to be known as Malbang Industrial Ecozone, through Proclamation No. 1428.

== Geography ==
=== Barangays ===
Maasim is politically subdivided into 16 barangays. Each barangay consists of puroks while some have sitios.

- Amsipit
- Bales
- Colon
- Daliao
- Kabatiol
- Kablacan
- Kamanga
- Kanalo
- Lumasal
- Lumatil
- Malbang
- Nomoh
- Pananag
- Poblacion (Maasim)
- Seven Hills
- Tinoto

=== Climate ===
Climate data for Maasim, Sarangani
| Month | Jan | Feb | Mar | Apr | May | Jun | Jul | Aug | Sep | Oct | Nov | Dec | Year |
|---|---|---|---|---|---|---|---|---|---|---|---|---|---|
| Mean daily maximum °C (°F) | 31 (88) | 31 (88) | 31 (88) | 32 (90) | 30 (86) | 29 (84) | 29 (84) | 29 (84) | 30 (86) | 30 (86) | 30 (86) | 31 (88) | 30 (87) |
| Mean daily minimum °C (°F) | 23 (73) | 23 (73) | 23 (73) | 24 (75) | 25 (77) | 25 (77) | 24 (75) | 24 (75) | 24 (75) | 24 (75) | 24 (75) | 24 (75) | 24 (75) |
| Average precipitation mm (inches) | 129 (5.1) | 106 (4.2) | 148 (5.8) | 180 (7.1) | 261 (10.3) | 316 (12.4) | 295 (11.6) | 274 (10.8) | 220 (8.7) | 238 (9.4) | 243 (9.6) | 181 (7.1) | 2,591 (102.1) |
| Average rainy days | 17.4 | 16.2 | 19.5 | 22.8 | 27.6 | 27.9 | 26.5 | 25.7 | 24.0 | 26.6 | 27.2 | 23.5 | 284.9 |
Source: Meteoblue

== Demographics ==
Population census of Maasim
| Year | Pop. | ±% p.a. |
|---|---|---|
| 1970 | 17,201 | — |
| 1975 | 20,227 | +3.30% |
| 1980 | 22,915 | +2.53% |
| 1990 | 26,734 | +1.55% |
| 1995 | 31,641 | +3.21% |
| 2000 | 39,424 | +4.83% |
| 2007 | 49,274 | +3.12% |
| 2010 | 52,933 | +2.64% |
| 2015 | 59,468 | +2.24% |
| 2020 | 64,940 | +1.87% |
| 2024 | 67,907 | +1.08% |
Source: Philippine Statistics Authority

The majority of the population are Moro and Lumad origin. One of the indigenous peoples living in mountainous areas of Maasim is known as Bla'an.

== Economy ==
Poverty incidence of Maasim (%)

Source: Philippine Statistics Authority

The economy of Maasim is largely based on agriculture with a high level production of copra (dried coconut meat). Animal husbandry is the second biggest income earner, notably cattle farming. Other agricultural products are coconuts, maize, sugarcane, bananas, pineapples, mangoes, eggs, beef, and fish.

The economy has accelerated in the past decade, driven by advances in global communication technology and the finishing of a modern highway that greatly improved trade and transport.

=== Kamanga Power Plant ===
KPP announced on June 3, 2008, that Alcantara-controlled Conal Holdings Co. would build in mid-2009 the $450 million 200-megawatt clean coal Kamanga Power Plant, in Maasim, Saranggani. The plant was expected to supply part of Mindanao's baseload power requirements when it is operational in 2012.
