= Digital Broadcasting Corporation =

Defunct Hong Kong digital radio broadcaster

Digital Broadcasting Corporation Hong Kong Limited
- Type: Propriety Limited Company
- Industry: Media, digital audio broadcasting
- Predecessor: Wave Media Limited
- Founded: 7 January 2008; 18 years ago
- Founder: Albert Cheng
- Defunct: 7 September 2016
- Headquarters: Units 301, 302, 304, 306, Level 3 Core A-B, Cyberport 3, Hong Kong
- Area served: Hong Kong (DAB+), International (Online)
- Products: 7 channels
- Owners: Bill Wong Cho-bau (99.6%)
- Website: dbc.hk

Digital Broadcasting Corporation Hong Kong Limited (DBC) (Chinese: 香港數碼廣播有限公司), formerly known as Wave Media Limited (Chinese: 雄濤廣播有限公司), was a licensed independent digital audio broadcasting (DAB+) operator with most number of channels in Hong Kong. DBC was granted licence by the Hong Kong Broadcasting Authority in March 2011. There are currently four operators providing digital audio broadcasting services with a total of 18 channels. Being the largest digital broadcaster in the territory, DBC operates 7 channels. Major shareholder of DBC is Bill Wong. Board of directors are Arthur Li, Ambrose Lee Siu-kwong and Loh Chan.

In summer 2012, DBC underwent a period of corporate dispute, leading the station to closure. Albert Cheng said shareholder Bill Wong had refused to invest more funds after receiving instructions from an unnamed official at the Central Government's Liaison Office in Hong Kong. The radio station announced its closure on 10 October 2012. On 19 October 2012, activists and radio hosts began a three-day sit-in protest in front of the government headquarters in Admiralty.

On 20 December 2013, DBC held its grand re-launch. Calling an end to the previous corporate dispute was the restructuring of board of directors. Albert Cheng is no longer a shareholder of nor a host in DBC.

DBC decided to close and return its operating licence to the government with effect from 7 September 2016 affecting 113 staff, because the digital audio broadcasting was not popular, and it did not receive enough advertisement to support the revenue.

== Channels ==
=== DBC 1 Radio Prime ===
Weekday Program

- Morning Octopus (Chinese: 早晨八達通) Monday to Saturday 0730–1000
- All Time Happy (Chinese: 大家「真」風騷) Monday to Sunday 1000–1300
- Up High The Sky (Chinese: 撐起半邊天) Monday to Friday 1300–1500; Saturday 1300–1600
- Career Boom! (Chinese: 職場引爆) Monday to Friday, 1500–1700
- DBC Home (Chinese: DBC 主場) Monday to Friday 1700–2000
- Music Dessert (Chinese: 有姬音樂) Monday to Friday 2000–2100
- My Heart Will Go On (Chinese: 星空再遇鐵達尼) Monday to Friday 2100–2300
- Night Still Young (Chinese: 我哋唔政經) Monday to Friday 2300–0100

Saturday Program

- The World on Stage (Chinese: 小舞台大世界) Saturday 1300–1500
- Afternoon Delight (Chinese: 說得出的慢活)Saturday 1500–1800
- Hi End Music Show (Chinese: 發燒音樂會) Saturday and Sunday 1800–1900
- AV fanatics (Chinese: 發燒玩家) Saturday and Sunday 1900–2100
- AhVMusic (Chinese: 我的黃金時代)Saturday and Sunday 2100–2200
- Love Beyond Limits(Chinese: 越界傾情) Saturday 2200–2400

Sunday Program

- Entertainment Report (Chinese: 特務008) Sunday 1300–1500
- Beautiful Mission (Chinese: 美麗任務) Sunday 1500–1600
- Pets Sweet Pets (Chinese: 寵愛有家) Sunday 1600–1700
- The Eco War (Chinese: 保衞地球大作戰) Sunday 1700–1800
- Music Live Show (Chinese: 繾綣星光下) Saturday and Sunday 2100–0000

=== DBC 2 Radio News ===
- Morning News 0600–0730
- Morning News and Traffic Updates 0730–1000
- Morning News (Hong Kong, International, China, Taiwan) 1000–1200
- Afternoon News Monday to Friday 1200–1230
- Afternoon News and Traffic Updates Monday to Friday 1230–1400
- Afternoon News Saturday to Sunday 1230–1400
- Afternoon News 1400–1600
- News (Hong Kong, International, Finance) 1600–1800
- Evening News and Traffic Updates Monday to Sunday 1800–2000
- Evening News (Hong Kong, International Headline) 2000–2300
- News Roundup (Hong Kong, International, Peripheral Stock Exchange) 2300-0100
- Midnight News 0100–0600

=== DBC 3 Radio Finance ===
Weekdays

- Countdown to the Morning Bell (Chinese: 贏在起跑線) 0830-0930
- Markets Now (Morning)(Chinese: 贏盡全場) 0930-1200
- News 1200–1300
- Markets Now (Afternoon)(Chinese: 贏盡全場) 1300–1600
- After the Bell (Chinese: 今日大贏家) 1600–1800
- News 1800–2030
- Wall Street at Cyberport (Chinese: 數碼講華爾街) 2030–2100
- Moves with Fire (Chinese: 火速燈台) 2100–2200
- 10 Things You Need to Know (Chinese: 霎吓拾吓) 2200–2230

=== DBC 4 Radio Campus ===
Weekdays

- Happy Parents (Chinese: 親親寶貝) Monday to Sunday 08:30–0900
- Active Elite (Chinese: 活力群星盡精英) 0900–1000
- Campus Parade (Chinese: 校園巡禮) 1000–1200;1900–2100
- Liberal Tone (Chinese: 天下通‧識天下) 1200–1400
- 8910 Campus (Chinese: 8910 大本營) 1400–1600
- Super Classroom (Chinese: 非常班房) 1600–1800
- DBC Campus DJ (Chinese: 校園DJ) Monday to Sunday 1800–1900
- My Heart Will Go On (Chinese: 星空再遇鐵達尼) 2100-0000

Saturday

- Talk to Heroes (Chinese: 強人是你) 0900-1000
- Study Overseas (Chinese: 學貫中西) 1000–1200;1900–2100
- Ears Travellers (Chinese: 耳朵去旅行) 1200–1400
- Digital Sports News (Chinese: 數碼體壇) 1400–1600
- Family Doctor (Chinese: 家一點健康) 1600–1800
- To Sir With Love (Chinese: 給老師的信) 2100–2200
- Love Tutorial (Chinese: 明愛暗戀補習社) 2200-0000

Sunday

- Beating the unbeatable (Chinese: 我有我天地) 0900-1000
- U Station (Chinese: 大學站) 1000–1200;1900–2100
- Green Discovery (Chinese: 綠色大發現) 1200–1400
- Sing Out the Real Me (Chinese: 唱出真我) 1400–1600
- To Students With Love (Chinese: 化雨之聲) 2100–2200
- Voice of Books (Chinese: 打開心窗睇睇書) 2200-000

=== DBC 5 Radio Smiles ===
Filipino:

- Pinoy Fuse: Tuesday and Thursday 18:00–21:00 (Replay: Wednesday and Friday 1100–1400
- Tsikahan Sa Hong Kong: Monday and Saturday 2000–2300 (Replay: Tuesday and Sunday 1500–1800)
- Radyo Migrante: Thursday 2100–2300 (Replay: Friday 1500–1700)
- Pinoy Tambayan: Sunday 2000–2200 (Replay: Monday 1500–1700)

Indonesian

- Nongkrong Bareng: Wednesday 2000–2300 (Replay: Thursday and Saturday 1500–1800; Sunday 0900–1500)
- Selamat Malam Sobat Migran: Tuesday 2100–2300 (Replay: Wednesday 1500–1700)
- Kumpul Bareng: Sunday 2200–0000 (Replay: Monday 1700–1900)

Korean

- Super K-Pop Monday 1100–1500; Weekdays 2300–0100

(Broadcast Arirang radio program)

=== DBC 6 Radio Music ===
Weekdays

- In the Wee Small Hours: Monday 0600–0900
- Featured Picks: 0900-1300
- Popular Classics: 1300–1600
- 逸樂生活館: 1600–1800
- 師妹揀首新歌: 1800–1900
- 揀首男女: 1900–2000
- 音樂 DNA: 2000–2100
- 愛與樂飛行: 2100–2300
- 夜空傳情: 2300-0100
- 抒情夜曲: 0100-0600

=== DBC 7 Radio Opera ===
Canton Opera

- Monday to Friday 0400–0900;1100–2300
- Saturday and Sunday 0700–1200;1400–2300

Chaozhou

- Monday to Friday 0900–1100
- Saturday and Sunday 1200–1400

Angel Ching Time (Chinese: 戲語蓉蓉)

- Monday to Friday 1200–1400
- Monday to Friday (Replay) 2300-0100

Opera Mix

- Monday to Sunday 1900–2100
- Saturday and Sunday 0600–0900

Shanghai Shaoxing Opera

- Monday to Sunday 2100–2300
- Saturday and Sunday 2300–0000

Chinese Traditional Music

- Monday to Sunday 0100–0300
- Saturday and Sunday 0000–0100

Peking Opera

- Monday to Sunday 0300–0600
