= South Cotabato Rehabilitation and Detention Center =

Prison in South Cotabato, Philippines

- Location within Mindanao mainland Location within Philippines
- Location: Koronadal, Philippines; 6°30′42.88″N 124°50′47.11″E
- Status: Operational
- Security class: Minimum
- Population: 1,600
- Managed by: Government of the Philippines

The South Cotabato Rehabilitation and Detention Center is a prison in Koronadal City, South Cotabato province, Soccsksargen region, Mindanao, Philippines.

== Prison ==
A security check, called "Greyhound operation", is performed in the prison on a monthly basis.
