= Santo Niño, South Cotabato =

Municipality in South Cotabato, Philippines

Santo Niño
- Municipality
- Municipality of Santo Niño

Other transcription(s)
  - Jawi: سنتو نيڽو
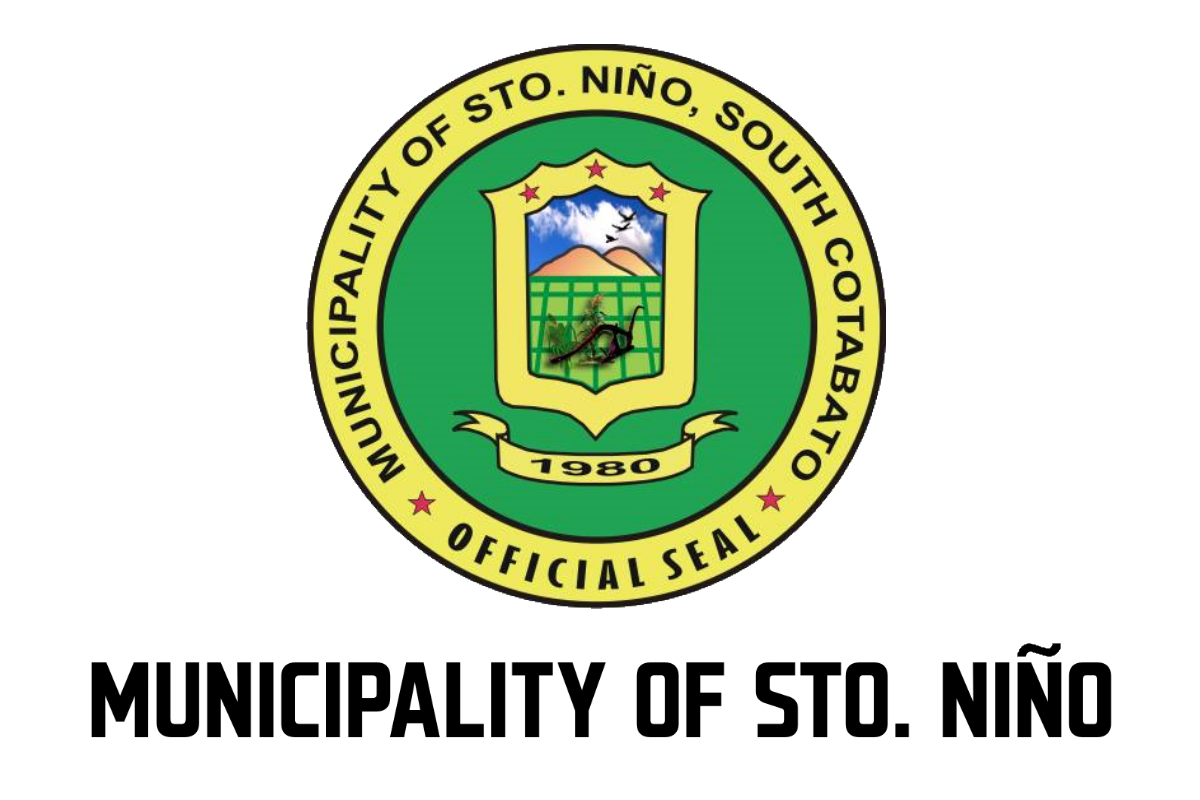
- Flag Seal

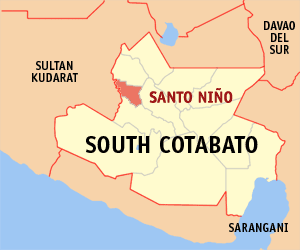
- Map of South Cotabato with Santo Niño highlighted
- Interactive map of Santo Niño
- Location within the Philippines
- Coordinates: 6°25′45″N 124°40′46″E
- Country: Philippines
- Region: Soccsksargen
- Province: South Cotabato
- District: 2nd district
- Founded: December 23, 1980
- Barangays: 10 (see Barangays)

Government
  - Type: Sangguniang Bayan
  - Mayor: Sulpicio F. Villalobos
  - Vice Mayor: Wilfredo B. Dimzon
  - Representative: Dibu S. Tuan
  - Municipal Council: Members: Paul Philipp V. Matinong; Diogenes P. Hare; Nelson Q. Segura; Rene O. Apostol; Joel L. Baradas; Helen F. Fale; Danilo F. Manua; Edilberto F. Aspila Jr.
  - Electorate: 25,676 voters (2025)

Area
  - Total: 86.20 km^{2} (33.28 sq mi)
- Elevation: 160 m (520 ft)
- Highest elevation: 440 m (1,440 ft)
- Lowest elevation: 115 m (377 ft)

Population (2024 census)
  - Total: 41,026
  - Density: 475.9/km^{2} (1,233/sq mi)
  - Households: 9,892

Economy
  - Income class: 2nd municipal income class
  - Poverty incidence: 13.56% (2023)
  - Revenue: ₱ 187.8 million (2024)
  - Assets: ₱ 469.2 million (2024)
  - Expenditure: ₱ 174.2 million (2024)
  - Liabilities: ₱ 115.9 million (2024)

Service provider
  - Electricity: South Cotabato 1 Electric Cooperative (SOCOTECO 1)
- Time zone: UTC+8 (PST)
- ZIP code: 9509
- PSGC: 1206318000
- IDD : area code: +63 (0)83
- Native languages: Hiligaynon; Cebuano; Maguindanao; Blaan; Tagalog
- Website: stoninoscot.gov.ph

Santo Niño, officially the Municipality of Santo Niño (Hiligaynon: Banwa sang Santo Niño; Cebuano: Lungsod sa Santo Niño; Tagalog: Bayan ng Santo Niño; Maguindanaon: Inged nu Santu Ninyu, Jawi: ايڠد نو سنتو نيڽو), is a municipality in the province of South Cotabato, Philippines. According to the 2024 census, it has a population of 41,026 people, making it the least populated municipality in the province.

== History ==
The municipality's name was derived from its patron saint, the “Santo Niño”, or the Holy Child. It was formerly called Barrio Trece (13) (although many still called the town proper this name) of the Norala Settlement District of then National Land Settlement Administration.

The Sangguniang Panlalawigan (Provincial Council) of South Cotabato passed a resolution in 1980 requesting then Assemblyman Jose T. Sison to file a bill at the Philippine Parliament to create Santo Niño a municipality. Parliament Bill No. 1220 was finally passed and approved on December 23, 1980, when Ferdinand Marcos signed it into law as Batas Pambansa Bilang 90. In a plebiscite held on April 7, 1981, the law was ratified.

Municipal mayors:

- Dr. Norberto Oliveros (1981–1986)
- Dr. Geronimo Dabalus, appointed by the Aquino Government after the 1986 EDSA Revolution (1986–1988)
- Antonio F. Damandaman Sr. (1988–1998)
- Dr. Ervin B. Luntao (1998–2007)
- Antonio F. Damandaman Sr. (2007–2016)
- Pablo M. Matinong Jr. (2016–2020)
- Sulpicio F. Villalobos (2020–present)

== Geography ==
Situated in the fertile Allah Valley, it is the smallest municipality by land area in the province.

It is bounded by the Municipality of Norala (its mother-town) in the north, the Municipality of Surallah in the east, Allah River and the Municipality of Bagumbayan, Sultan Kudarat in the south, and the Municipality of Isulan, Sultan Kudarat in the west.

=== Barangays ===
Santo Niño is politically subdivided into 10 barangays. Each barangay consists of puroks while some have sitios.

- Ambalgan
- Guinsang-an (Bo.4)
- Katipunan (Bo.11)
- Manuel Roxas (Bo.10)
- New Panay (Bo.9)
- Poblacion (Bo. 13)
- San Isidro (Bo. 12)
- San Vicente (Bo. 5)
- Teresita
- Sajaneba

=== Climate ===
Climate data for Santo Niño, South Cotabato
Month	Jan	Feb	Mar	Apr	May	Jun	Jul	Aug	Sep	Oct	Nov	Dec	Year
Mean daily maximum °C (°F)	30 (86)	30 (86)	31 (88)	31 (88)	30 (86)	29 (84)	28 (82)	29 (84)	29 (84)	29 (84)	29 (84)	30 (86)	30 (85)
Mean daily minimum °C (°F)	23 (73)	23 (73)	23 (73)	24 (75)	24 (75)	24 (75)	24 (75)	24 (75)	24 (75)	24 (75)	24 (75)	23 (73)	24 (74)
Average precipitation mm (inches)	146 (5.7)	121 (4.8)	164 (6.5)	212 (8.3)	347 (13.7)	397 (15.6)	364 (14.3)	366 (14.4)	302 (11.9)	308 (12.1)	280 (11.0)	192 (7.6)	3,199 (125.9)
Average rainy days	16.7	15.5	19.4	22.7	29.0	28.9	27.9	27.5	26.5	28.1	27.2	22.6	292
Source: Meteoblue

Average temperature in the municipality ranges from a low of 23 °C (73 °F) to a high of 32 °C (90 °F) throughout the year.

Precipitation can be low during the dry season (March to April) at about 40 millimetres (1.6 in) while it can be high especially during the wetter months (May to July) at 100 millimetres (3.9 in).

== Demographics ==
Population census of Santo Niño
Year	Pop.	±% p.a.
1990	30,076	—
1995	32,103	+1.23%
2000	36,228	+2.63%
2007	38,400	+0.81%
2010	39,738	+1.25%
2015	40,947	+0.57%
2020	39,796	−0.60%
2024	41,026	+0.73%
Source: Philippine Statistics Authority

The population is highly literate.

While the most spoken language is Hiligaynon, everyone can speak Tagalog, some Cebuano, and basic conversational English.

Barangay Ambalgan is predominantly Maguindanaon who speak the Maguindanaon language and are considered the ethnic inhabitants of the municipality. The rest of the barangays are predominantly Christian settlers who first arrived in the area in the 1940s but majority arrived in 1970s during the reign of Marcos Sr.

The municipality is generally peaceful with relatively low crime incident.

== Economy ==
Poverty incidence of Santo Niño (%)

Source: Philippine Statistics Authority

Rice production is the primary industry. The well-irrigated rice-lands of the municipality are possible due to the presence of a river irrigation system which is provided by a dam at Allah River at Barangay M. Roxas.

Corn (maize) is the secondary product. Copra is also produced.

Small businesses which provide basic necessities thrive.

== Tourism ==
- Bugtong Bukid, a hill along the national highway west to Isulan at Barangay M. Roxas. The municipal government had invested in a swimming pool project in this area sometime in the 1990s but was closed due to mismanagement and lack of maintenance. Nonetheless, this hill is a geological wonder in itself being the only hill of its kind in the area. Folklore also has it that the huge acacia tree near the hill is home to a kapre.
- The steel bridge that traversed Allah River and connects the municipality to nearby barangays of Bagumbayan, Sultan Kudarat. The bridge is an excellent location for an afternoon stroll. Carabaos take their baths in late afternoon at the river; time your visit during these hours.

== Transportation ==
The Santo Nino Public Terminal is a hub for public utility buses and vans that travel to Koronadal City via Surallah and Banga. Travel time from Santo Nino to Koronadal City is around 30 minutes.

General Santos, where the General Santos International Airport is located, is accessible by public buses and vans from Koronadal City. Travel time from Koronadal City to General Santos is about one hour.

Travel within the municipality is through public utility tricycles and motorcycles.

== Healthcare ==
The Municipal Health Office at the Municipal Hall Compound provides services for consultations.

Private clinics include:

- Dr. Ervin B. Luntao Family Clinic and Hospital
- Dr. Zenaida Maglaya Clinic
- St. Jude Clinic and Hospital

There are a number of small pharmacies at the municipality.

== Education ==
The municipality has a number of public and private schools. These are:

High Schools

- Santo Nino National School of Arts and Trades (public), at Barangay San Isidro
- Santo Nino National High School (public), at Poblacion
- Notre Dame of Santo Nino (private, a diocesan school), at Poblacion
- Public high schools in (New) Panay, Katipunan, and Guinsang-an

Elementary Schools

- Santo Nino Central Elementary School (public elementary school), at Poblacion
- Public elementary schools at other nine barangays (Katipunan, Guinsang-an, Ambalgan. San Isidro, Sajaneba, M. Roxas)
- Notre Dame of Santo Nino (private, a diocesan school), at Poblacion
- Montessori Casa Precious Jewels (private elementary school), at Poblacion
- Libertad Kiddie Care Center Incorporated, LKKCI (Private elementary school), at Poblacion
