= South Cotabato =

- Province

Other transcription(s)
  - Jawi: سلاتن كوتوات
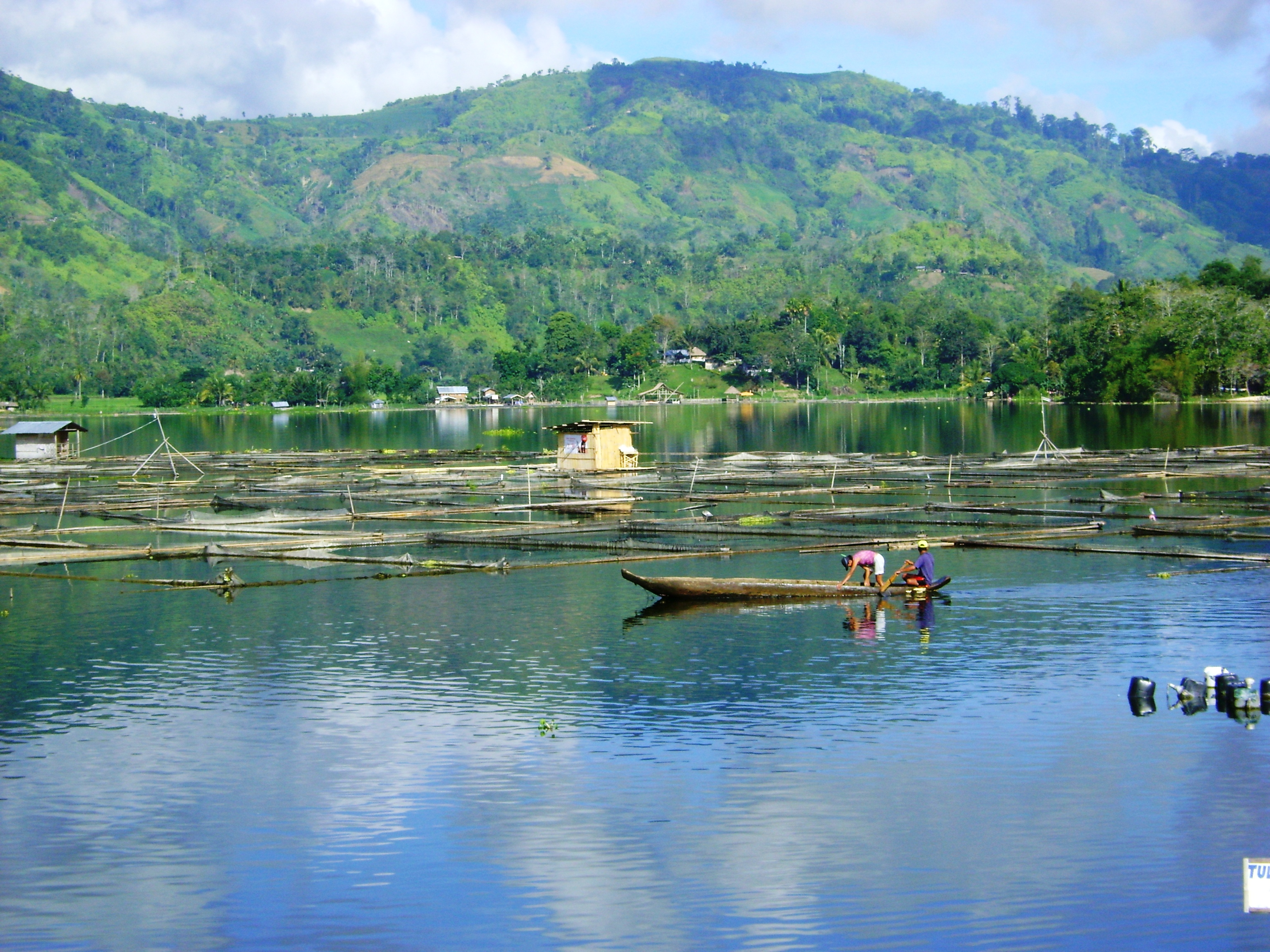
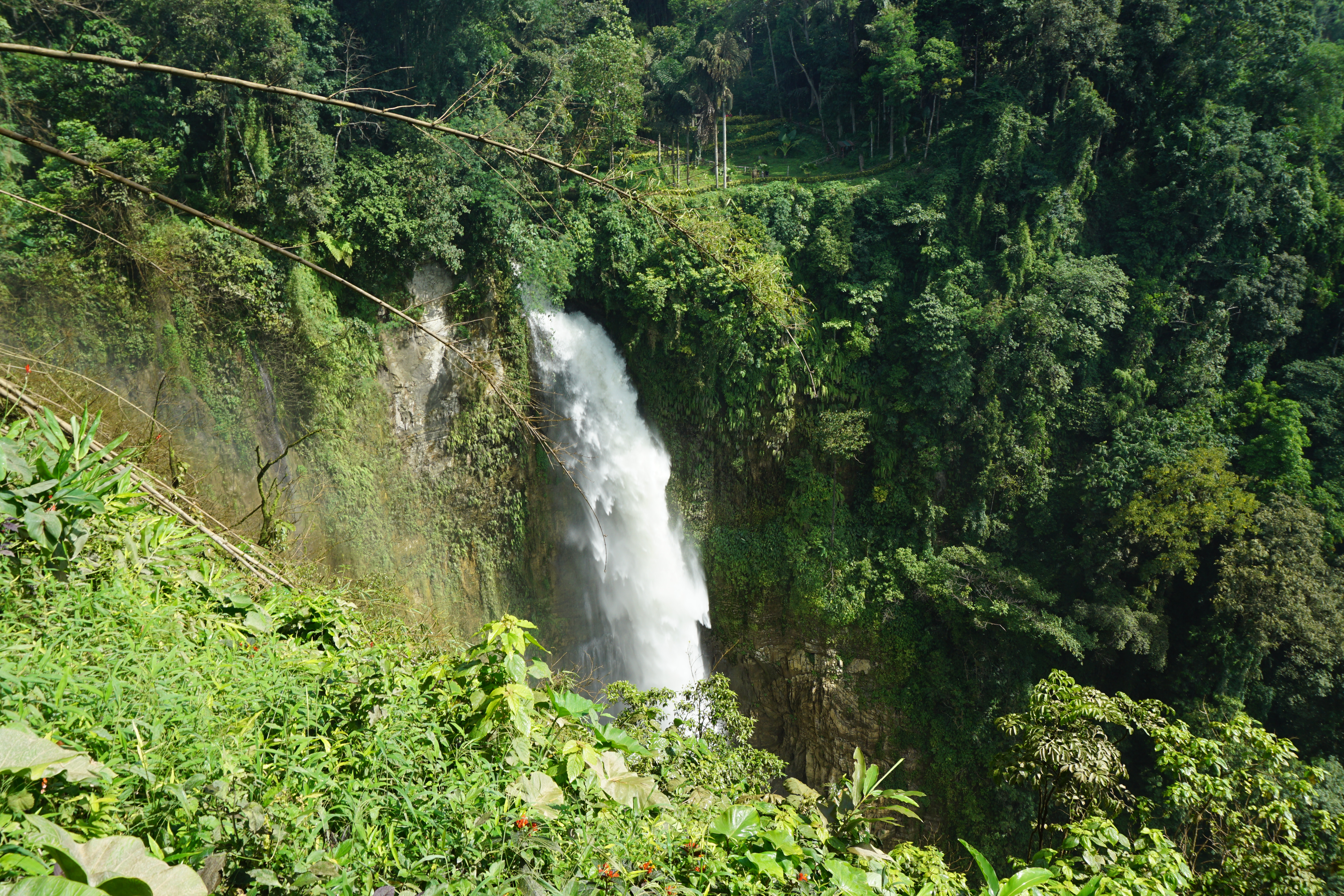
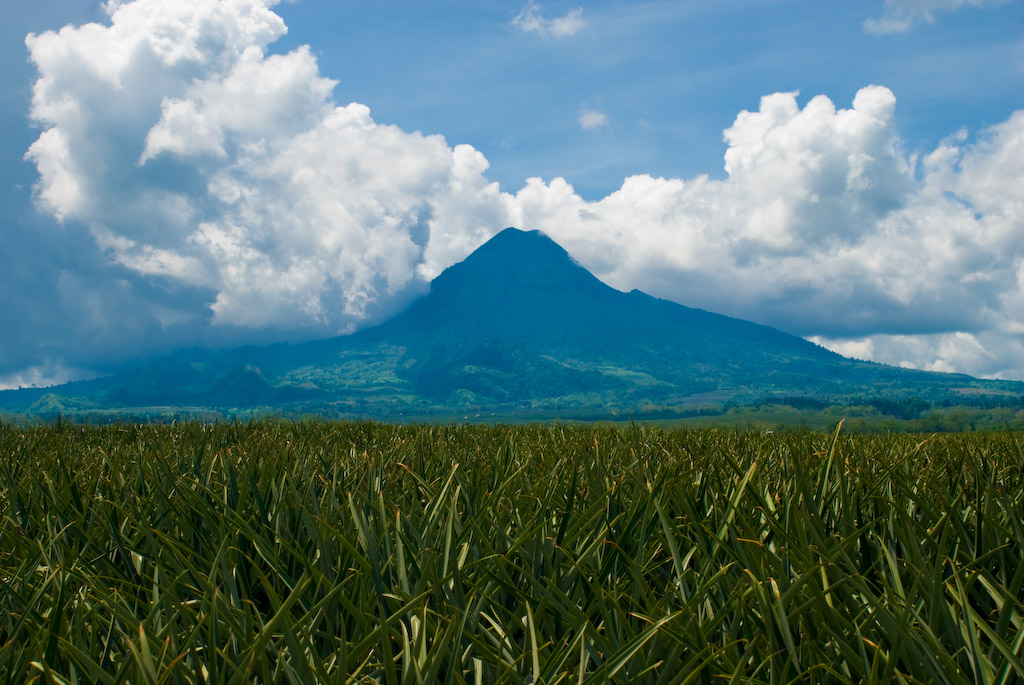
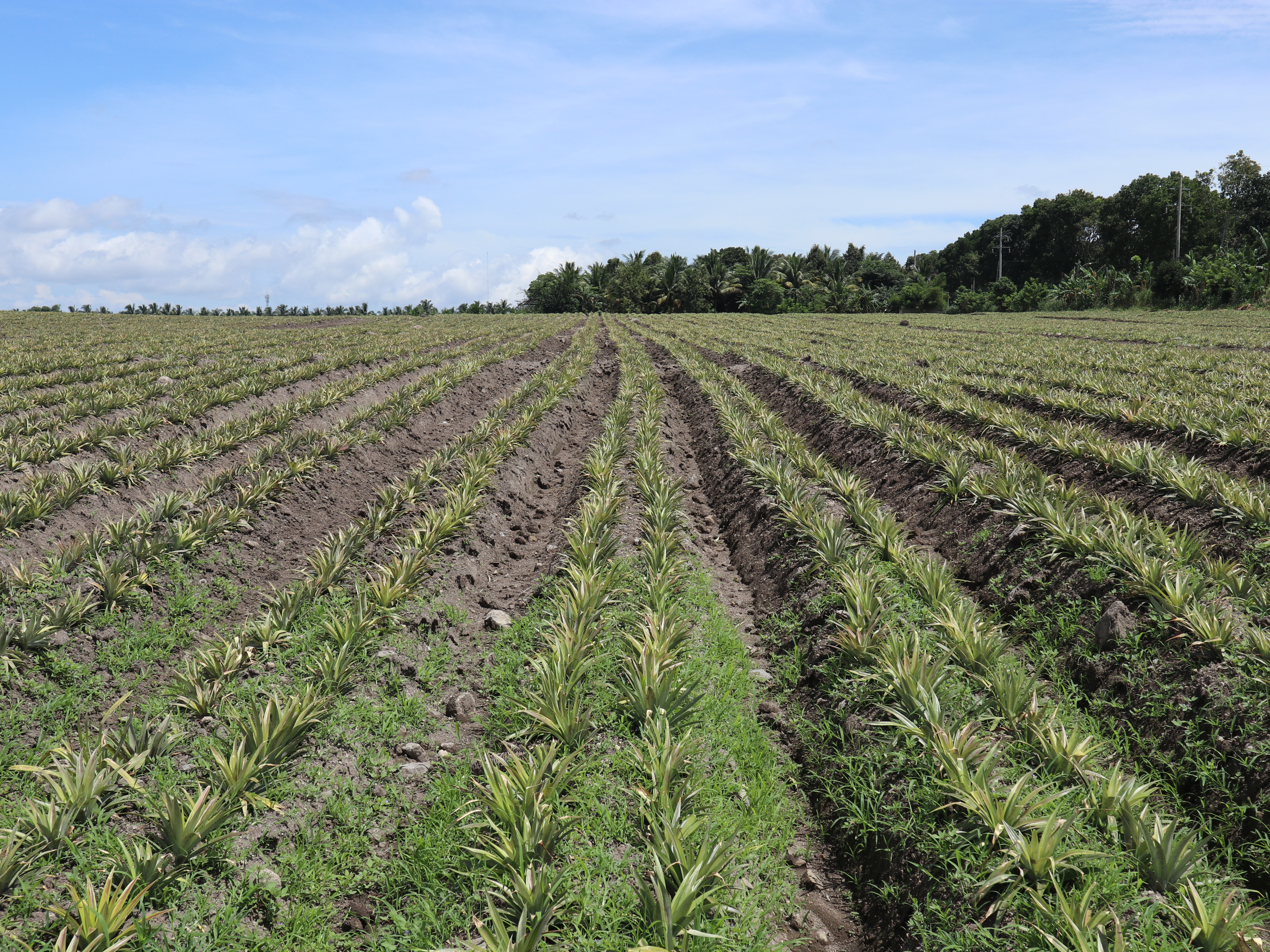
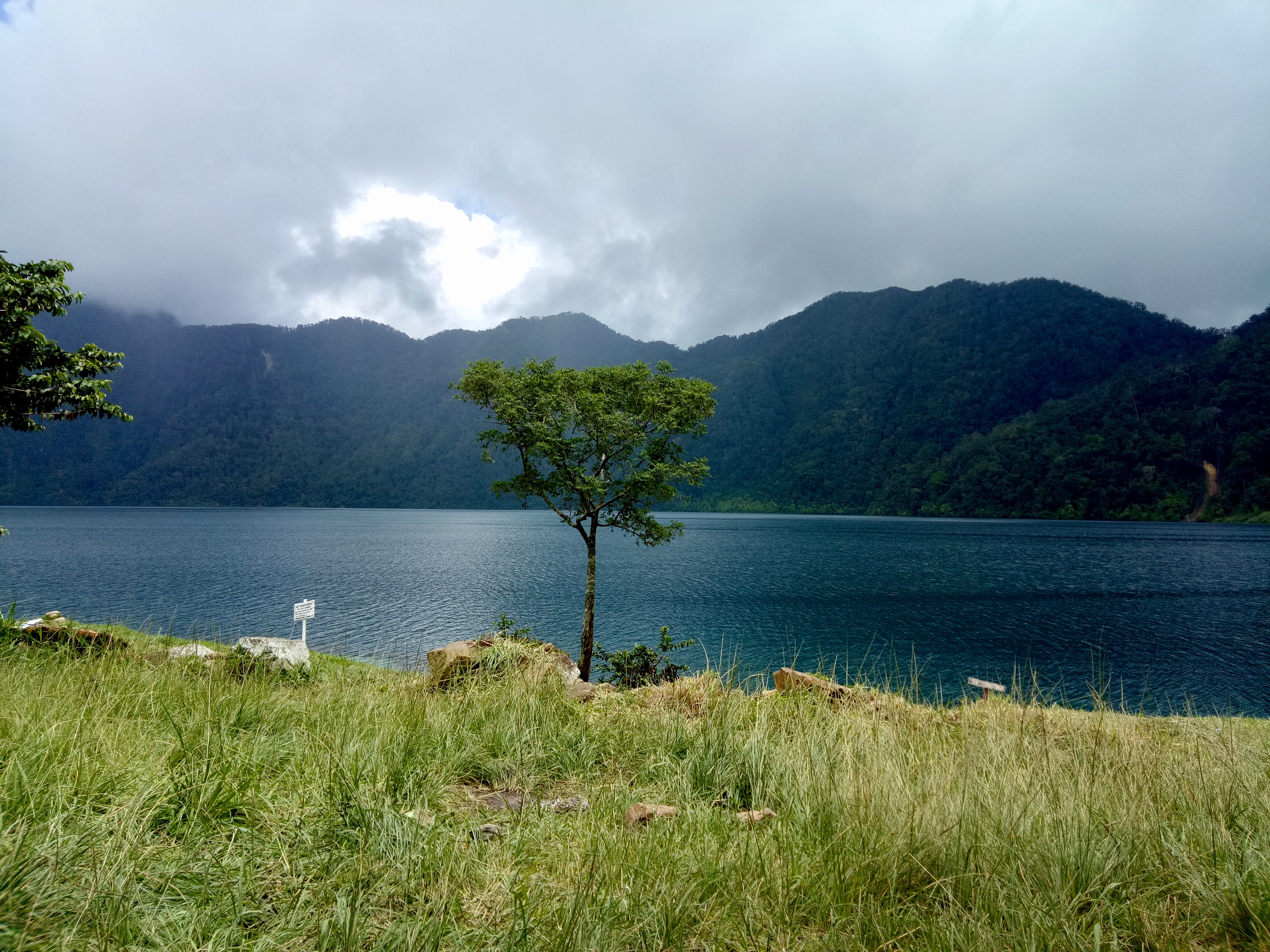
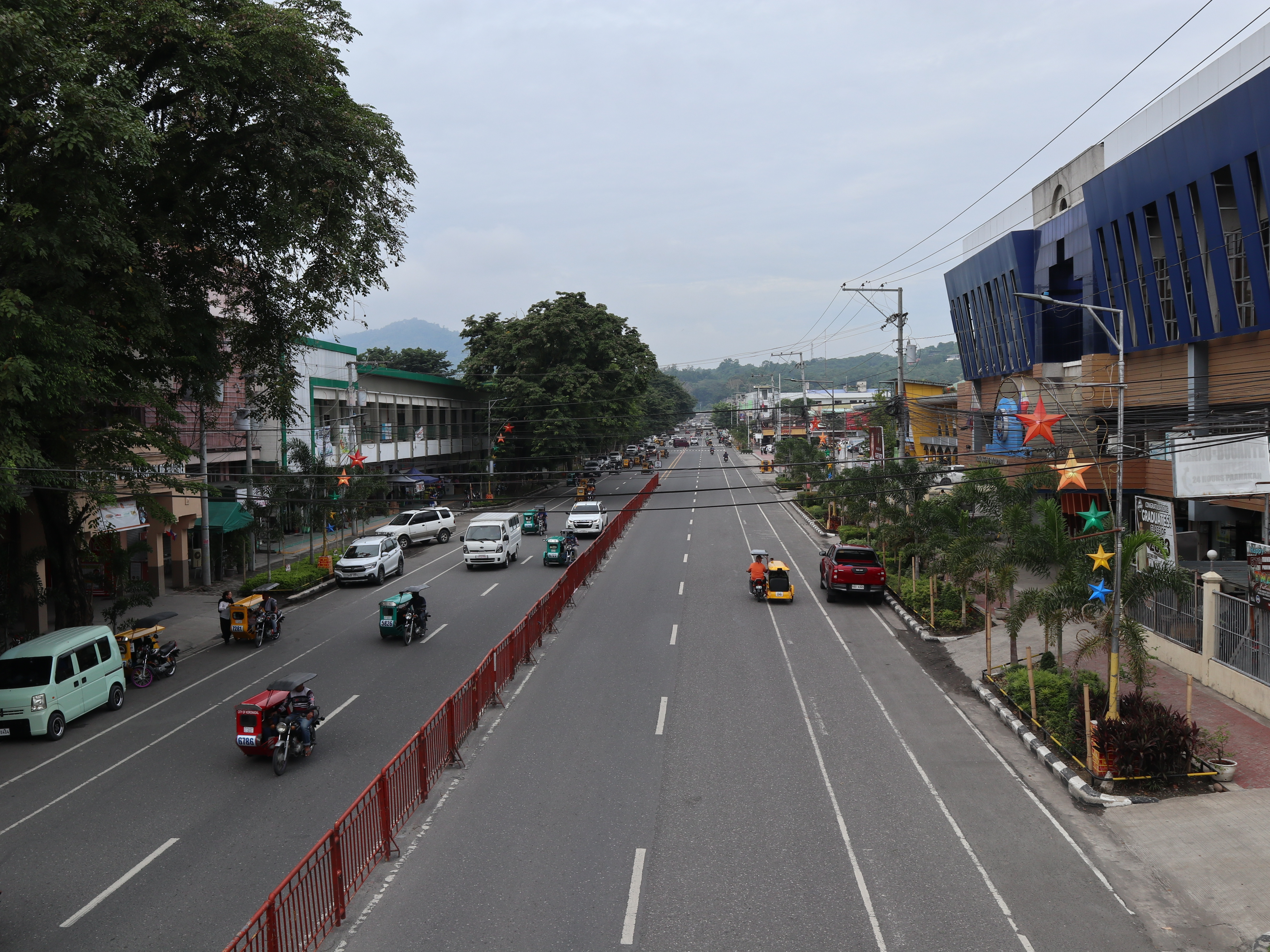
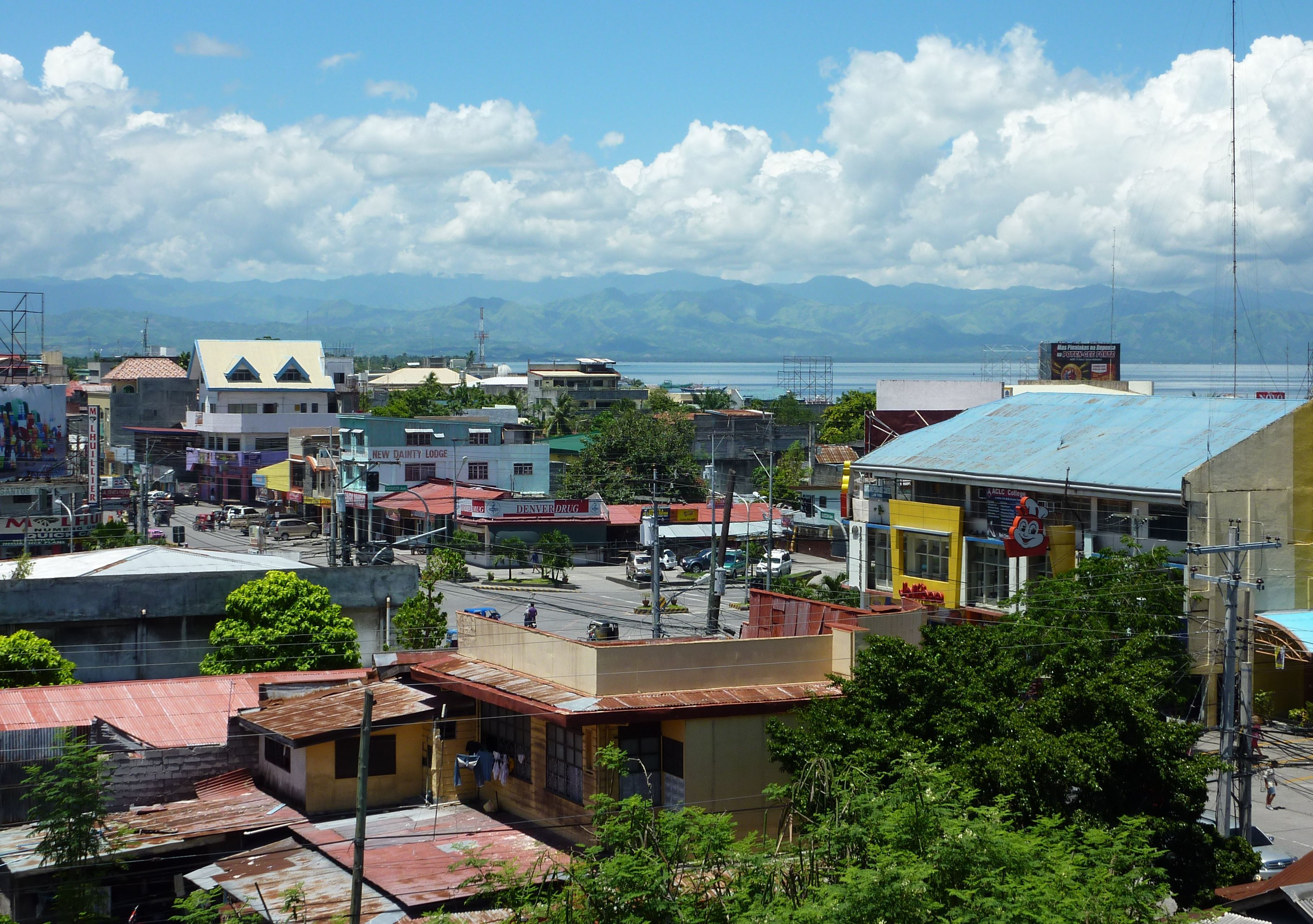
- (from top: left to right) Lake Sebu, Seven Falls in Lake Sebu, Mount Matutum, Tupi Polonuling Pineapple Plantation, Lake Holon in T'boli, Koronadal Downtown and General Santos

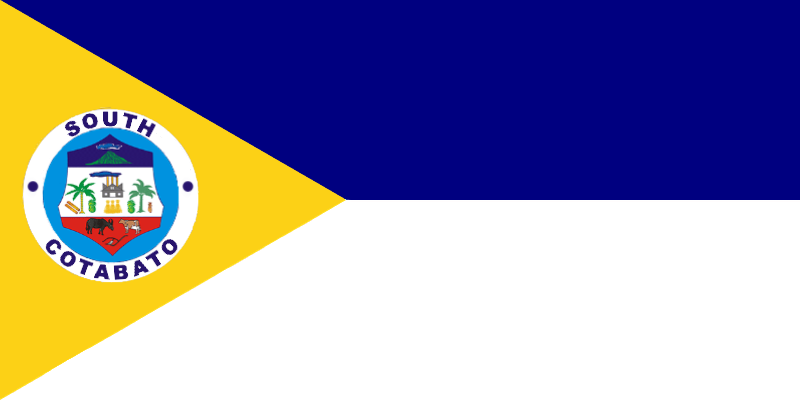
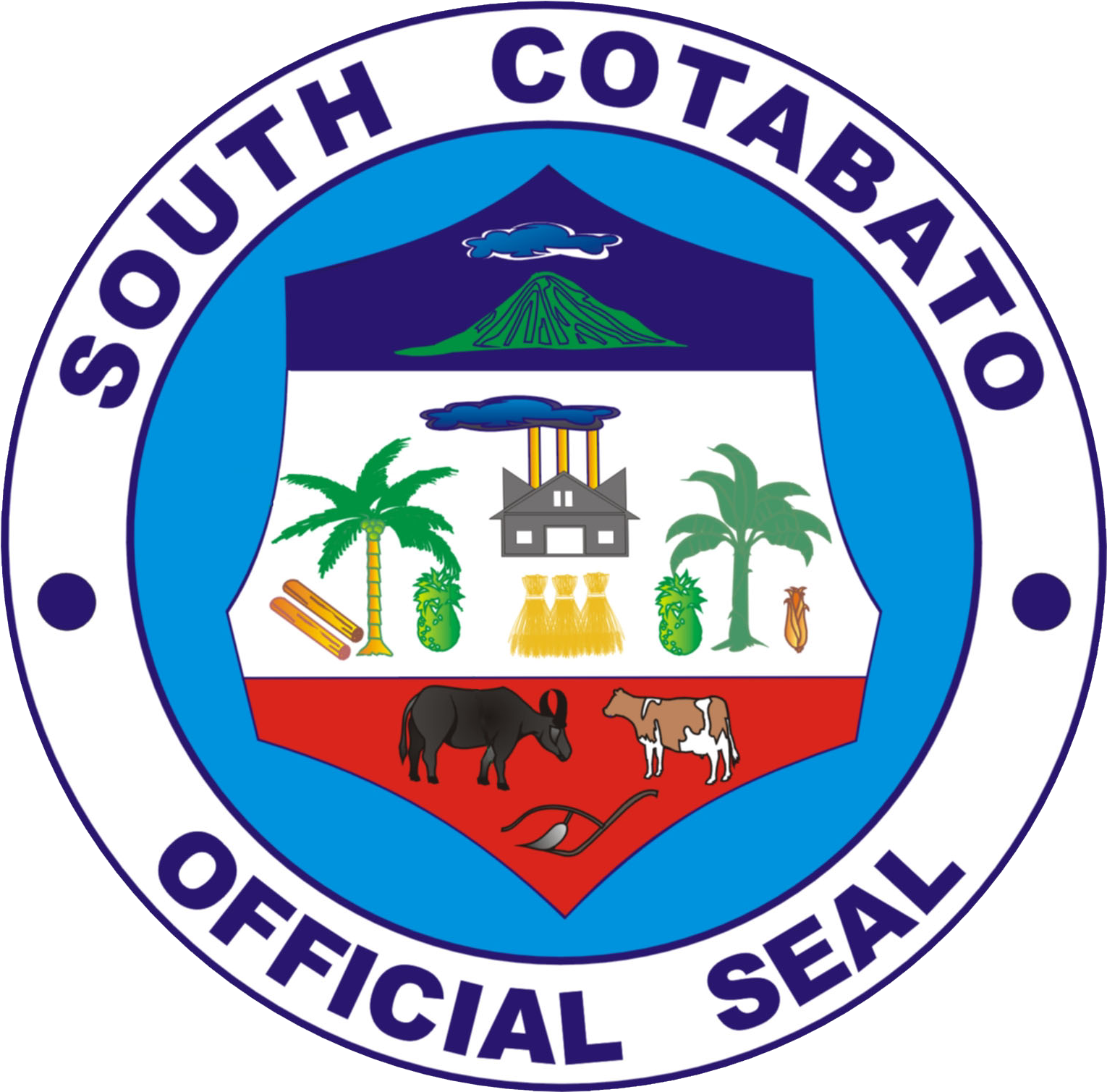
- Flag Seal
- Nickname: Land of the Dreamweavers
- Location in the Philippines
- Interactive map of South Cotabato
- Coordinates: 6°10′N 125°00′E
- Country: Philippines
- Region: Soccsksargen
- Founded: July 18, 1966
- Capital: Koronadal
- Largest city: General Santos*

Government
  - Type: Sangguniang Panlalawigan
  - Governor: Reynaldo S. Tamayo Jr. (PFP)
  - Vice Governor: Arthur Y. Pingoy Jr. (PFP)
  - Legislature: South Cotabato Provincial Board
  - Electorate: 997,821 voters (2025)

Area
  - Total: 3,935.95 km^{2} (1,519.68 sq mi)
  - Rank: 32nd out of 82
- (excluding General Santos)
- Highest elevation (Mount Matutum): 2,286 m (7,500 ft)

Population (2024 census)
  - Total: 1,010,009
  - Rank: 29th out of 82
  - Density: 256.611/km^{2} (664.620/sq mi)
  - Rank: 41st out of 82
  - Households: 244,987
- (excluding General Santos)
- Demonym(s): South Cotabatnon; South Cotabateño

Divisions
  - Independent cities: 1: General Santos*
  - Component cities: 1: Koronadal
  - Municipalities: 10: Banga; Lake Sebu; Norala; Polomolok; Santo Niño; Surallah; T'Boli; Tampakan; Tantangan; Tupi
  - Barangays: 200; 226 (including independent cities)
  - Districts: Legislative districts of South Cotabato; Legislative district of General Santos

Economy
  - Income class: 1st provincial income class
  - Poverty incidence: 10.1% (2023)
  - Revenue: ₱ 2,997 million (2024)
  - Assets: ₱ 8,671 million (2024)
  - Expenditure: ₱ 2,681 million (2024)
  - Liabilities: ₱ 188.2 million (2024)
- Time zone: UTC+8 (PST)
- PSGC: 126300000
- IDD : area code: +63 (0)83
- ISO 3166 code: PH-SCO
- Spoken languages: Hiligaynon; Cebuano; Maguindanaon; Tboli; Blaan; Ilocano; Tagalog
- Website: www.southcotabato.gov.ph
- * General Santos is a highly-urbanized city, politically independent from South Cotabato.

South Cotabato, (Note: Hiligaynon: Bagatnan Cotabato; Cebuano: Habagatang Cotabato; Ilocano: Abagatan a Cotabato; Maguindanaon: Salatan Kutawatu, Jawi: سلاتن كوتوات; Filipino: Timog Cotabato) officially the Province of South Cotabato, is a province in the Philippines located in the Soccsksargen region in Mindanao. Its capital is Koronadal (also the regional center of Soccsksargen), and it borders Sultan Kudarat to the north and west, Sarangani to the south and northeast, and Davao del Sur to the far northeast. To the southeast lies Sarangani Bay.

General Santos, the only coastal city/town located on the shores of Sarangani Bay, is the largest city in both the province and the region (by population), but is governed independently from the province. The province of Sarangani used to be part of South Cotabato until it was made an independent province in 1992.

== History ==
=== Early history ===
Centuries ago, the area that would be the South Cotabato was sparsely inhabited by Maguindanaon pioneers and Lumads which are under Sultanate of Maguindanao's influence. The Spaniards launched expeditions to subdue the area throughout the colonial era but they never gained control of the region until the middle of the 19th century after the Spaniards established a military post at what is now Barangay Tamontaka, one of the earliest Christian settlements founded south of the Philippines, in present-day Cotabato City. Spaniards already took with them Chavacano-speaking Christians and Muslims from Zamboanga and Basilan, as well as the Visayans, especially the Hiligaynons and Cebuanos.

=== American colonial era ===
The area of what is now South Cotabato and Sarangani provinces used to be part of Davao province until 1914, when the reorganization of the districts in Mindanao took place, thus it became part of the then-undivided Cotabato province. Settlers, who would lay the foundation of what would become a progressive province, started trooping down 1914.

During the term of President Manuel L. Quezon in the late 1930s, General Paulino Santos led the first of wave of settlers to the province.

=== Philippine independence ===
After World War II, the final exodus of settlers from Luzon and Visayas poured into the area's virgin land. In the early 1960s as population, trade and industries grew in southern part of Cotabato, a clamor of local self-governance arose. Thus, on July 18, 1966, South Cotabato was separated from Cotabato as an independent province. At that time, the province consisted of 11 municipalities, namely: Banga, South Cotabato, General Santos (now a city), Glan, Kiamba, Koronadal, Maitum, Norala, Polomolok, Surallah, Tantangan, and Tupi. These municipalities were established long before the creation of the province. Other component municipalities were formed after it fully functioned as a province.

With the creation of regions under Pres. Ferdinand Marcos, South Cotabato was grouped with Region XI, also known as Southern Mindanao, in 1975.

In 1992, the province of Sarangani was formed out of South Cotabato. Seven towns in southern and coastal section of the province (Malungon, Alabel, Malapatan, Glan, Maasim, Kiamba and Maitum) became part of the new province, leaving South Cotabato with 11 remaining municipalities.

Regional offices were relocated to South Cotabato in accordance with EO 429 dated October 12, 1990, issued by President Corazon C. Aquino during the expansion of the newly created Autonomous Region in Muslim Mindanao, and EO No. 36 dated September 19, 2001, issued by President Gloria Macapagal Arroyo which says South Cotabato is to be transferred from Southern Mindanao region to Region XII and having the city of Koronadal as the regional center of Region XII.

=== Contemporary ===
On August 16, 2000, Republic Act No. 8803 was approved, that converted the municipality of Koronadal into a component city of South Cotabato.

== Geography ==
South Cotabato covers a total land area of 3,935.95 square kilometres (1,519.68 sq mi). When General Santos is included for geographical purposes, the province's land area is 4,428.81 square kilometres (1,709.97 sq mi). The province is situated on the southern section of central Mindanao, bounded by the provinces of Sultan Kudarat to the north and west, Sarangani to the south and northeast, Davao del Sur to the far northeast, and the Sarangani Bay to the southeast.

The province is generally flat dotted with some hills and mountains. General Santos City occupies the province's only coastline, making the rest of the province landlocked.

=== Climate ===
South Cotabato belongs to the fourth type of climate, that is rainfall is more or less evenly distributed throughout the year. The average number of rainy days for the year 2004 is recorded between 122 and 180 days with the months of May, June, July, August and October having the most occurrence.

Air humidity generally follows closely the rainfall pattern. Humidity is highest during the period of June to October with 88% being recorded at the Tupi seed farm. The months of February and April have the lowest air humidity recorded at about 72%.

Maximum daytime temperature throughout the province is in the range of 36 to 38 °C (97 to 100 °F), falling to 23 to 32 °C (73 to 90 °F) during the night depending on the elevation. The hottest period is January to April while July to December being the coolest.

South Cotabato enjoys a mild, pleasant climate with no pronounced dry or wet season, and is practically typhoon-free.

=== Administrative divisions ===
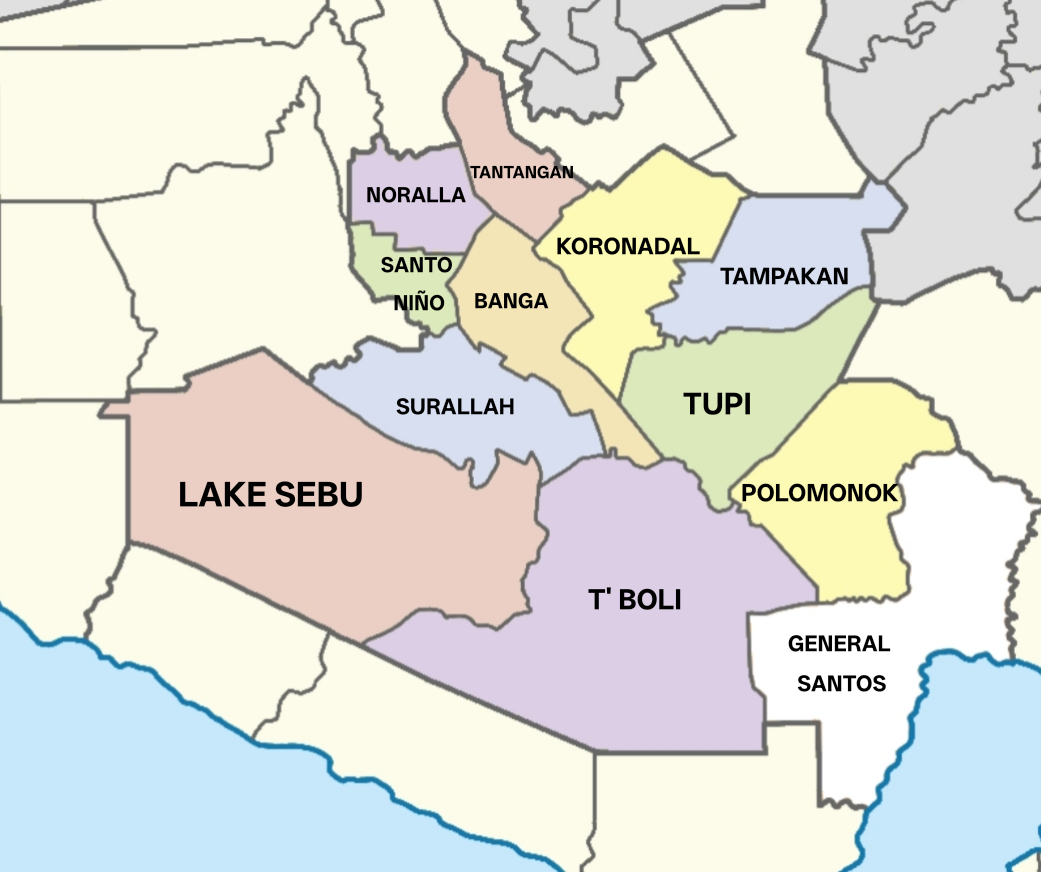
A map of South Cotabato with its municipalities

South Cotabato comprises 10 municipalities and 1 component city. The highly urbanized city of General Santos is traditionally grouped with, but administered independently from, the province. It has a total of 199 barangays (225 if the city of General Santos is included).

- † Provincial capital and component city
- Municipality
- ‡ Highly urbanized city (geographically within but independent from the province)
- ∞ Largest settlement

City or municipality		District	Population			±% p.a.	Area		Density		Barangay	Coordinates^{[B]}
			(2020)		(2015)		km^{2}	sq mi	/km^{2}	/sq mi		
Banga		2nd	9.1%	89,164	76,343	0.58%	240.35	92.80	370	960	22	6°25′25″N 124°46′24″E
General Santos City	‡ ∞	Lone	—	697,315	594,446	3.09%	492.86	190.29	1,400	3,600	26	6°06′50″N 125°10′18″E
Koronadal City	†	2nd	20.0%	195,398	174,942	2.13%	277.00	106.95	710	1,800	27	6°30′01″N 124°50′37″E
Lake Sebu		3rd	8.9%	81,221	87,442	−1.40%	702.00	271.04	120	310	19	6°13′29″N 124°42′42″E
Norala		3rd	4.8%	46,682	44,642	0.84%	123.20	47.57	380	980	14	6°31′08″N 124°39′24″E
Polomolok		1st	17.7%	172,605	152,589	2.37%	339.97	131.26	510	1,300	23	6°12′51″N 125°03′52″E
Santo Niño		3rd	4.1%	39,796	40,947	−0.54%	86.20	33.28	460	1,200	10	6°26′17″N 124°40′24″E
Surallah		3rd	9.2%	89,340	84,539	1.06%	540.30	208.61	170	440	17	6°22′32″N 124°44′50″E
Tampakan		1st	4.2%	41,018	39,525	0.71%	390.00	150.58	110	280	14	6°26′38″N 124°55′38″E
Tantangan		2nd	4.7%	45,744	43,245	1.08%	351.12	135.57	130	340	13	6°33′48″N 124°46′06″E
T'Boli		3rd	10.4%	101,049	91,453	1.92%	895.83	345.88	110	280	25	6°12′49″N 124°49′21″E
Tupi		1st	7.5%	73,459	69,976	0.93%	228.00	88.03	320	830	15	6°19′52″N 124°57′03″E
Total^{[C]}				975,476	915,289	1.95%	3,935.95	1,519.68	250	650	200	(see GeoGroup box)
1. Former names are italicized.; 2. Coordinates mark the town center, and are sortable by latitude.; 3. Total figures exclude the highly urbanized city of General Santos.

== Demographics ==
Population census of South Cotabato
Year	Pop.	±% p.a.
1903	30,774	—
1918	42,787	+2.22%
1939	58,224	+1.48%
1948	102,860	+6.53%
1960	136,609	+2.39%
1970	252,612	+6.33%
1975	329,534	+5.48%
1980	401,705	+4.04%
1990	539,458	+2.99%
1995	621,155	+2.68%
2000	690,728	+2.30%
2007	767,255	+1.46%
2010	827,200	+2.78%
2015	915,289	+1.95%
2020	975,476	+1.35%
2024	1,010,009	+0.84%
(excluding General Santos); Source: Philippine Statistics Authority

The population of South Cotabato (excluding General Santos) was 975,476 in the 2020 census, making it one of the country's most populous province. The population density is 250 inhabitants per square kilometre or 650 inhabitants per square mile.

When General Santos is included for geographical purposes, the province's population is 1,509,735 people, with a density of 341 inhabitants per square kilometre (880/sq mi).

=== Inhabitants ===
The people of South Cotabato have diverse heritages. The province's indigenous people are Blaan, Tboli and Maguindanaon. Ethnic Hiligaynons, descendants of migrants from Panay and Negros in the Visayas who settled in the municipalities/towns of Norala, Banga, Surallah, Santo Niño and the province's capital city, Koronadal, are the majority in the province. The province's major media of communication are Hiligaynon, Tagalog, On the other hand, Ilocano-speaking peoples of Luzon settled in Tampakan, Tantangan and Tupi, and the Ilocano language may still be heard in these towns. The Cebuanos are the main ethnic group of the municipality of Polomolok, and are one of the main ethnic groups of Tupi (along with the Hiligaynons, Ilocanos and Kapampangans). Both towns are near to General Santos, which speaks both Hiligaynon and Cebuano. Chavacano speakers are even found scattered in some areas of the province, as well as Maguindanaons because of the province's history of being part of Sultanate of Maguindanao. Tbolis mainly reside around the Lake Sebu area, while Blaans reside within General Santos and its outskirts.

=== Religion ===
Religion in South Cotabato
Religion	percentage
Roman Catholic	64.66%
Protestant	22.35%
Islam	4.31%
Iglesia ni Cristo	2.32%
Others	6.36%

Roman Catholics predominate the province with 65% adherence, while Islam is a minority religion which is 6% of the population. Other minorities are various Christian Churches such as Protestants which form about 22% and consist of mostly evangelicals of the province's population which can be mostly found in some urban parts of the province. Iglesia ni Cristo forms about 3-4% population. The remainder are divided among Buddhist and animism.

The Maguindanaon make up the majority of the Muslim population in the province. Other indigenous Filipino tribes are the T'boli and B'laan tribes in Lake Sebu and T'boli municipalities, famous for their brassworks, beadwork and t'nalak weave. The people of these tribes wear colorful embroidered native costumes and beadwork accessories. The women of these tribes, particularly, wear heavy brass belts with brass 'tassels' ending in tiny brass bells that herald their approach even when they are a long way off.

The people of South Cotabato retain many of the practices and traditions of their particular tribal heritages, although infused with a flavor that is distinctly Mindanaoan and the product of cultural interaction between the immigrants and the indigenous peoples of the area. One vivid example of this is the predominant use of the native malong, the colorful, tubelike garment used as a skirt by the indigenous tribes, in place of a blanket or sleeping bag.

=== Language ===
Hiligaynon is the most widely spoken language in the province. It is the main language in the capital city of Koronadal—earning its nickname "the Ilonggo Capital of Mindanao"—and the municipalities of the Upper Valley region, namely, Surallah, Banga, Norala, Sto. Niño and Tantangan, followed by Cebuano, which is the majority language of General Santos and the main language in the Municipalities of Polomolok, Tampakan and Tupi. Tagalog are widely understood and often used for administrative functions by the local government and in education, with the former serving as dominant language in local media and of everyday communication of speakers of different languages, making it a secondary lingua franca in the province. Other languages spoken in the province are Maguindanaon, Tboli, Blaan, Kapampangan and Ilocano.

== Economy ==
Poverty incidence of South Cotabato (%)

Source: Philippine Statistics Authority

== Government ==
Executive Branch:

- Governor: Reynaldo S. Tamayo Jr. (PFP)
- Vice Governor: Arthur Y. Pingoy (PFP)

Legislative Branch:

Sangguniang Panlalawigan (Provincial Board Members)

- First District:
1. SP Nilda Almencion (PFP)
2. SP Noel J. Escobillo (PFP)
3. SP Alan Ines (PDP-Laban)
- Second District:
1. SP Marie Antonina "Junette" Ines Hurtado (PFP)
2. SP Dardanilo N. Dar (PDP-Laban)
3. SP Ervin Luntao (PFP)
4. SP Mike Matinong (PFP)
5. SP Alicia Causing (PFP)
6. SP Henry L. Ladot (PFP)
7. SP Cecile Diel (PFP)
- Third District:

Ex-Officio Members:

1. SP Vincent Figueroa, SK President
2. SP Sharmaigne Arianne Sala, PCL President
3. SP Edgar G. Sambog, IPMR
4. SP Neil Ryan T. Escobillo, LnB President

=== Provincial capital ===
The Local Provincial Government holds its official functions in the City of Koronadal. The Provincial Capitol, Provincial Hospital, and all related offices are found in the city.

=== Legislative districts ===
District	City	Municipality	Population (2024)
1st	-	Polomolok; Tupi; Tampakan	297,574
2nd	Koronadal	Banga; Tantangan	341,950
3rd	-	Lake Sebu; Norala; Santo Niño; Surallah; T'Boli	370,485
Lone	General Santos	-	722,059

- 1st District Representative: Isidro D. Lumayag
- 2nd District Representative: Ferdinand L. Hernandez
- 3rd District Representative: Dibo S. Tuan
- Lone District of General Santos: Shirlyn Bañas-Nograles

House Bill No. 4678, filed on December 13, 2016, by 1st district Rep. Pedro B. Acharon, Jr., seeks to segregate the highly urbanized city of General Santos from the said district to form its congressional district, separate from the representation of South Cotabato. This bill was signed by the president last March 11, 2019.

=== List of governors of South Cotabato since 1966 ===
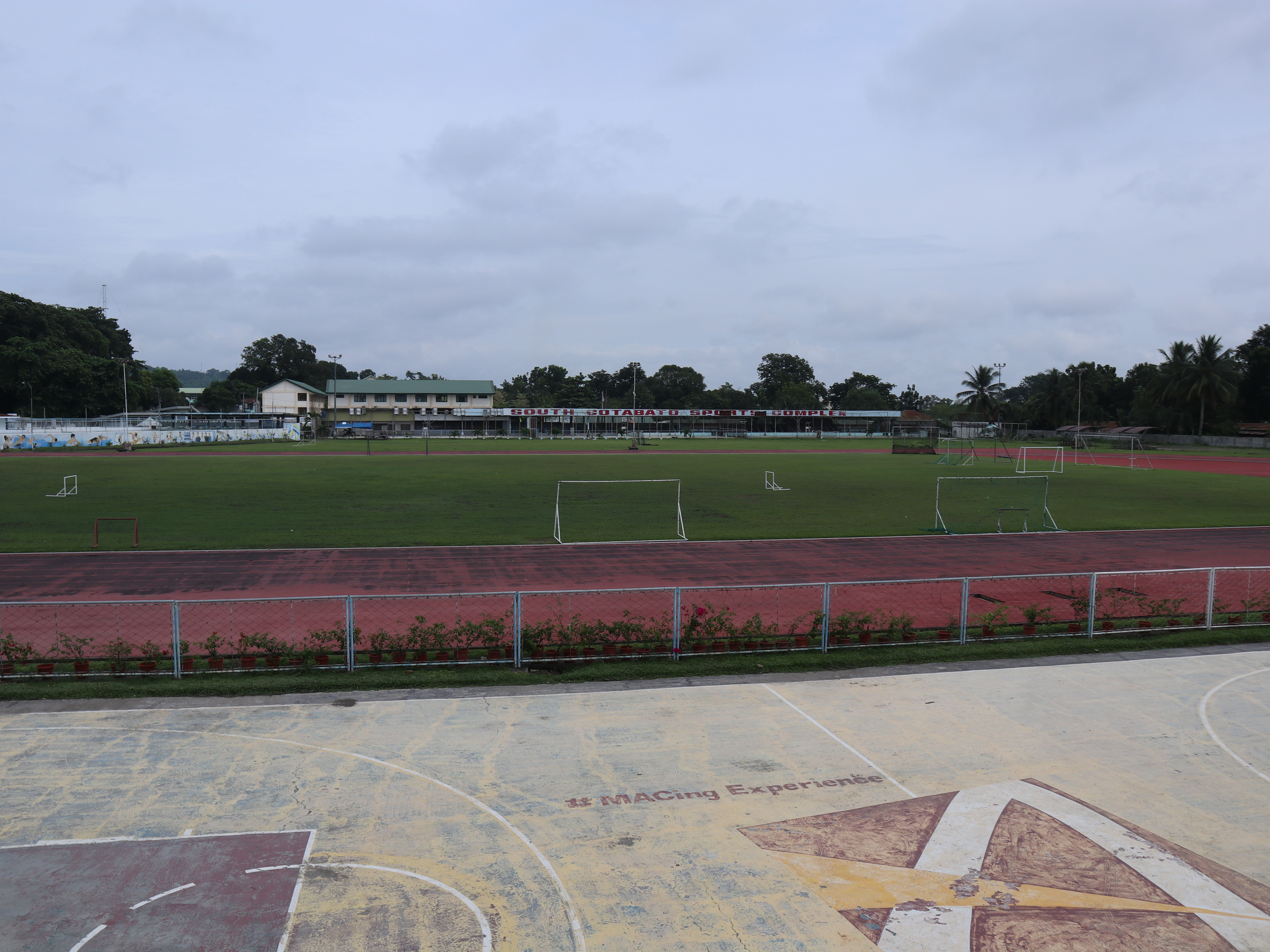
South Cotabato Sports Complex

- 1966–1986: Sergio B. Morales – The first governor of South Cotabato after its creation as a province in 1966. Gov. Morales laid down key infrastructure and governance systems, such as the provincial capitol, hospitals, roads, and water systems, helping shape the future of the province.
- 1986–1992: Ismael Sueno – Elected after the EDSA Revolution; focused on development projects and governance. Gov. Sueno helped stabilize the province during the political transition from the Marcos Sr. regime to democracy.
- 1992–2001: Hilario E. De Pedro III – Gov. De Pedro oversaw the separation of Sarangani province from South Cotabato and continued modernizing South Cotabato’s infrastructure such as the South Cotabato Gym and Sports Complex. Gov. De Pedro was also instrumental in the conversion of Koronadal into a city, a milestone in South Cotabato's urban development and modernization.
- 2001–2010: Daisy P. Avance-Fuentes – Gov. Avance-Fuentes was known for her focus on poverty alleviation, social welfare improvements, and agricultural development. Under her leadership, South Cotabato gained recognition for transparency and good governance.
- 2010–2013: Arthur Y. Pingoy, Jr. – Gov. Pingoy focused on enhancing healthcare services and medical assistance programs, including free hospitalization for indigent residents within the province.
- 2013–2019: Daisy P. Avance-Fuentes - Gov. Avance-Fuentes during this term intensified social welfare programs and transparency on governance. She is also credited for modernizing the province's T'nalak Festival during this term as Governor.
- 2019–Present: Reynaldo Tamayo Jr. – Gov. Tamayo's administration is marked by progressive programs such as free education, hospitalization, and the mechanization of rice production. His policies have focused on improving the livelihoods of marginalized sectors.Known for Free Hospitalization, Free Education, and agricultural initiatives. Gov. Tamayo is also known to be the National President of Partido Federal ng Pilipinas which is Bongbong Marcos's Political Party and the largest party in the Philippines as of 2024. Under his leadership, South Cotabato has consistently won the Seal of Good Local Governance (SGLG), and it was named the most competitive province in Region XII in 2022.

== Musical heritage ==
The native Maguindanaon of South Cotabato have a culture that revolves around kulintang music, a specific type of gong music, found among both Muslim and non-Muslim groups of the Southern Philippines.

== Festivals of South Cotabato ==
South Cotabato is renowned for its vibrant and culturally rich festivals. These celebrations reflect the diverse heritage, traditions, and communal spirit of the region’s inhabitants. Here are some of the most notable festivals in South Cotabato:

Festival	Date	Location	Notes
Hinugyaw Festival	January 10	Koronadal City	Foundation anniversary of the City of Koronadal
Kulitangtang Festival	January 27	Tantangan	
Pasundayag Festival	March 4	Banga	
Kamayadan Festival	March 10	Norala	
Seslong Festival	March 16	T'Boli	
Kalipayan Festival	March 23	Koronadal City	Foundation anniversary of Barangay Poblacion Zone IV
Molo Festival	April 24	Koronadal City	Foundation anniversary of Branagay Paraiso
SurbeTube Festival	June 24	Surallah	
Tamfaken Lum Alay Festival	June 25	Tampakan	
T'nalak Festival	July 18	South Cotabato	Foundation anniversary of the Province of South Cotabato
Agten Tufi Festival	September 11	Tupi	
Pinyahan Festival	September 1	Polomolok	Foundation anniversary of Barangay Cannery Site
FlomLok Festival	September 10	Polomolok	
Charter Anniversary	October 8	Koronadal City	Cityhood Anniversary of Koronadal
Kasadyahan Festival	October 20	Koronadal City	Foundation anniversary of Barangay General Paulino Santos
Lumbayag Festival	October 20	Koronadal City	Foundation anniversary of Barangay Santa Cruz
Helobung Festival	November 11	Lake Sebu	
Bayo-Bayo Festival	November 21	Koronadal City	Foundation anniversary of Barangay Cacub
Hinublag Festival	December 23	Santo Niño	

== Education ==
South Cotabato boasts a diverse array of educational institutions catering to the needs of its growing population. These institutions range from primary and secondary schools to colleges and universities, providing comprehensive education opportunities across various fields of study.

Institution	Type	Location
University of the Philippines Manila School of Health Sciences Koronadal Campus	Tertiary	Koronadal City
Notre Dame of Marbel University	Tertiary	Koronadal City
Notre Dame of Dadiangas University Glamang Campus	Tertiary	Polomolok
South Cotabato State University	Tertiary	Surallah
St. Alexius College	Tertiary	Koronadal City
South East Asian Institute of Technology	Tertiary	Tupi
Ramon Magsaysay Memorial Colleges - Marbel Inc.	Tertiary	Koronadal City
Green Valley College Foundation	Tertiary	Koronadal City
STI College	Tertiary	Koronadal City
King's College of Marbel, Inc.	Tertiary	Koronadal City
Notre Dame – Siena College of Polomolok	Tertiary	Polomolok
Regency Polytechnic College	Tertiary	Koronadal City
Goldenstate College Marbel	Tertiary	Koronadal City
Marvelous College of Technology, Inc.	Tertiary	Koronadal City
ACLC College of Marbel	Tertiary	Koronadal City
Philippine Science High School Soccsksargen Region Campus	Secondary	Koronadal City
Notre Dame – Siena School of Marbel	Secondary	Koronadal City
Notre Dame of Marbel University – Integrated Basic Education Department	Secondary	Koronadal City
Notre Dame of Banga	Secondary	Banga
Notre Dame of New Iloilo	Secondary	Tantangan
Notre Dame of Norala	Secondary	Norala
Notre Dame of San Jose	Secondary	Koronadal City
Notre Dame of Santo Niño	Secondary	Santo Niño
Notre Dame of Surala	Secondary	Surallah
General Santos Academy, Inc.	Tertiary	Polomolok

== Health ==
South Cotabato is home to a range of medical facilities that provide comprehensive healthcare services to its residents. The province’s hospitals are strategically located across various municipalities and cities, ensuring accessible medical care for the community.

Hospital	Type	Location
Allah Valley Medical Center	Tertiary	Koronadal City
Bontuyan Medical Hospital, Inc.	Primary	Polomolok
Dantom Doctors' Hospital, Inc.	Primary	Banga
Dr. Arturo P. Pingoy Medical Center	Tertiary	Koronadal City
Heramil Hospital	Primary	Polomolok
Howard Hubbard Memorial Hospital	Tertiary	Polomolok
Javelosa Hospital	Primary	Surallah
Lake Sebu Community Hospital	Infirmary	Lake Sebu
Landero Hospital	Primary	Surallah
Manuel C. Callejo – City of Koronadal Infirmary Hospital	Infirmary	Koronadal City
Matutum Pines Medical Hospital	Tertiary	Tupi
Moorehouse Mission Hospital	Primary	T'boli
Norala District Hospital	Infirmary	Norala
Polomolok General Hospital	Infirmary	Polomolok
Polomolok Municipal Hospital	Infirmary	Polomolok
Saint Agustine Infirmary Hospital	Infirmary	Koronadal City
Saint Jude Hospital	Primary	Santo Niño
South Cotabato Provincial Hospital	Tertiary	Koronadal City
Soccsksargen General Hospital	Tertiary	Surallah
Socomedics Medical Center	Tertiary	Koronadal City
Surallah Community Hospital	Infirmary	Surallah
Tampakan General Hospital	Infirmary	Tampakan
Tantangan General Hospital	Infirmary	Tantangan
ZMK Doctors' Hospital	Primary	Santo Niño

== Notable people ==
=== Within the province jurisdiction ===
- Lovely Abella, actress, host and dancer (Koronadal)
- Cesar "Saro" Bañares, Jr., member of folk rock band Asin
- Eduardo Buenavista, Filipino long-distance runner and two-time Olympian (Santo Niño)
- Kenneth Duremdes, professional basketball player (Koronadal)
- Shuvee Etrata, actress, host, model and content creator (Polomolok)
- Orlando Quevedo, cardinal and archbishop-emeritus of Cotabato (Marbel)
- Ismael Sueno, former secretary of DILG during incumbent President Duterte's administration from 2016 to 2017 (Koronadal)
- Reynaldo Tamayo Jr., president of Partido Federal ng Pilipinas from 2022 to present

== Sister province ==
- Cebu Province
