= Philippine Science High School Soccsksargen Region Campus =

Public high school in South Cotabato, Philippines

Philippine Science High School Soccsksargen Region Campus in Koronadal City

Location
- Brgy. Paraiso; Koronadal, South Cotabato 9506; Philippines
- Coordinates: 6°29′20″N 124°49′00″E

Information
- Former name: Philippine Science High School – Soccsksargen Region Campus (2012–2025)
- Type: Public specialized high school
- Motto: "Weaving the Culture of Science, Mathematics, and Technology in SOCCSKSARGEN"
- Established: February 3, 2012
- Campus Director: Dr. Rochelle T. Papasin (2025-present)
- Grades: 7 to 12
- Language: English, Filipino
- Nickname: PISAY–SRC, Pisay, SRC
- Newspaper: The Twelfth Quill and Pisay Pluma
- Affiliation: Department of Science and Technology
- Website: src.pshs.edu.ph

Philippine Science High School Soccsksargen Region Campus in Koronadal City (PSHS–SRC) is a public secondary education institution in Koronadal, South Cotabato, Philippines. As part of the Philippine Science High School System, PSHS–SRC is intended to cater to students gifted in science and mathematics. Established in February 2012, the school first opened in June 2013.

== History ==
The lot where PSHS-SRC stands was acquired through a donation by the South Cotabato provincial government to the Department of Science and Technology (DOST) in September 2011. The DOST approved the construction of a new campus by 2012 in Koronadal as part of its plan to expand the Philippine Science High School System (PSHSS) in Soccsksargen. It is the third PSHSS campus in Mindanao, and the twelfth overall in the Philippines.

As an institution, the PSHS-SRC was established on February 3, 2012 via BOT Resolution No. 2012-02-04. The school began operations on June 17, 2013 with 52 initial students.

Following the passage of the Expanded Philippine Science High School System Act of 2025 into law in October 2025, the school expanded its name into "Philippine Science High School Soccsksargen Region Campus in Koronadal City".

There are plans to open a second campus in Soccsksargen in Carmen, Cotabato as compliance with the same law which mandates at least two PSHSS campuses per region.
