= Koronadal =

Capital city of South Cotabato, Philippines

Koronadal Marbel
- Component city
- City of Koronadal
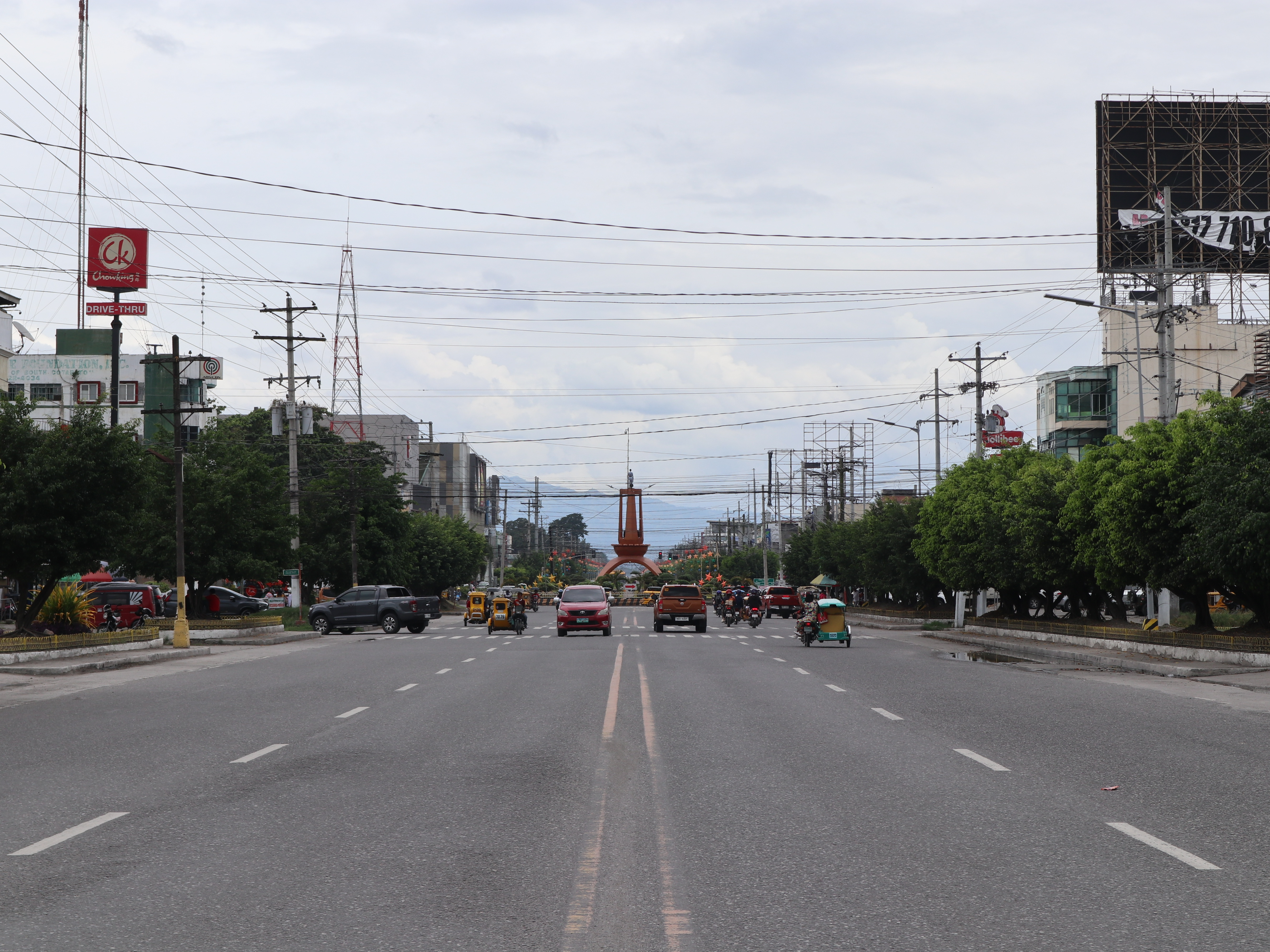
- Koronadal Poblacion Roundabout (top), City Hall (bottom)

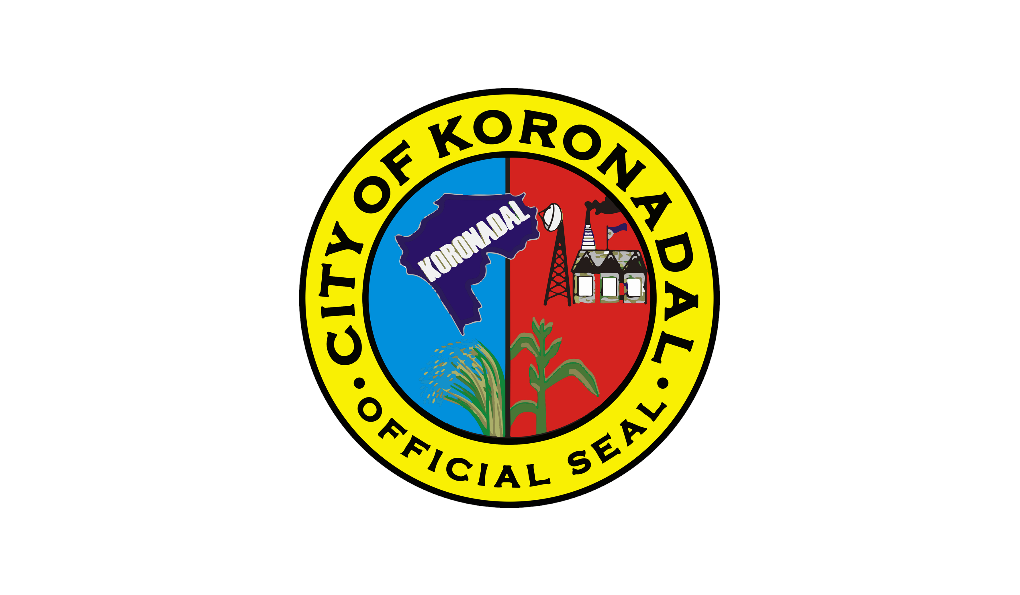
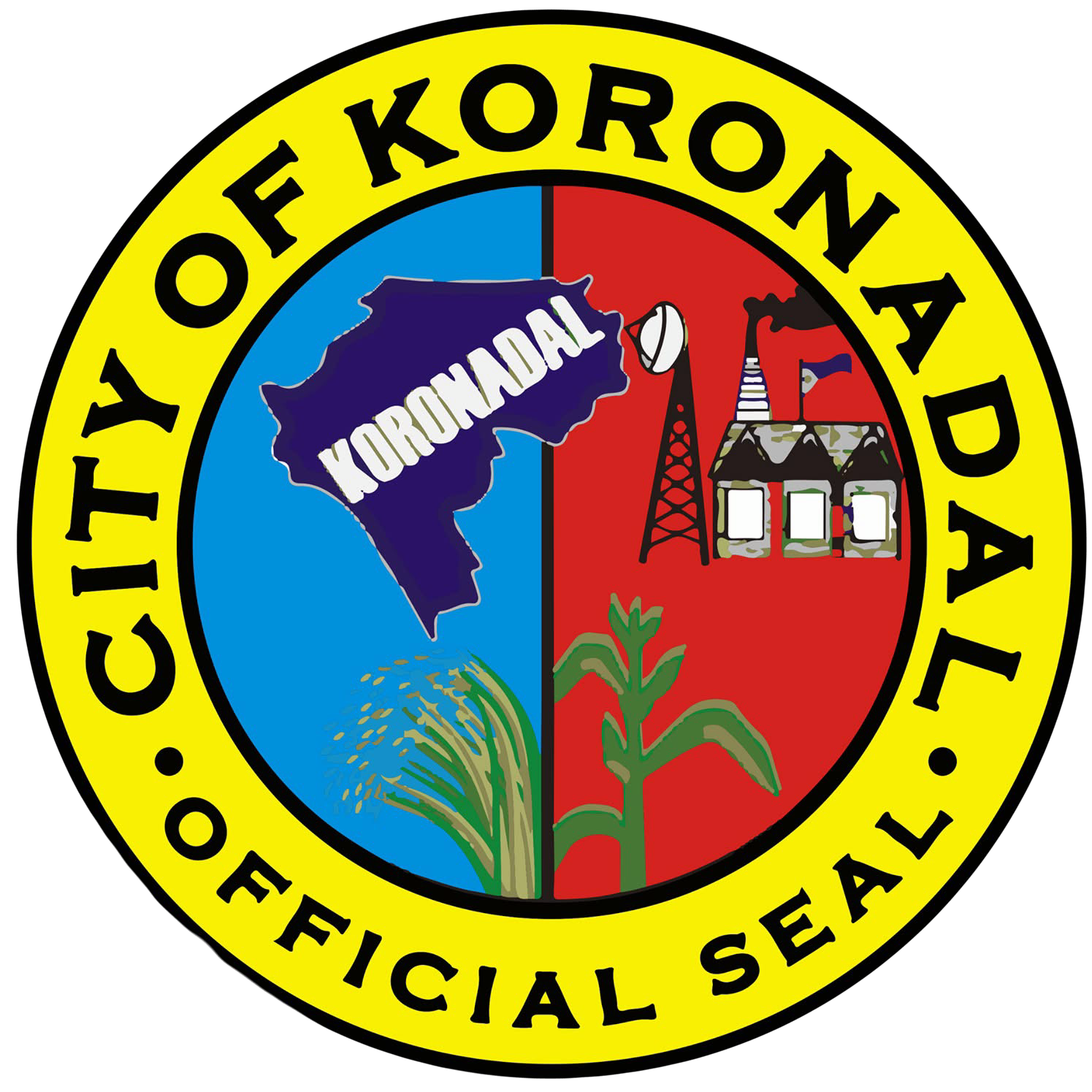
- Flag Seal
- Nicknames: Ilonggo City of Mindanao; Crown City of the South; Sports Mecca of the South
- Motto: Bagong Koronadal... Ngayon at Bukas!
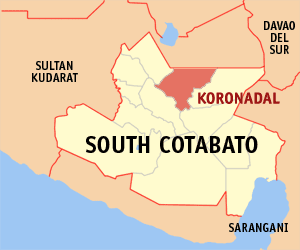
- Map of South Cotabato with Koronadal highlighted
- Interactive map of Koronadal
- Location within the Philippines
- Coordinates: 6°30′N 124°51′E
- Country: Philippines
- Region: Soccsksargen
- Province: South Cotabato
- District: 2nd district
- Founded: January 10, 1939 (as Marbel Settlement District)
- Chartered: August 18, 1947
- Cityhood: October 8, 2000
- Barangays: 27 (see Barangays)

Government
  - Type: Sangguniang Panlungsod
  - Mayor: Erlinda "Bing" Pabi Araquil
  - Vice Mayor: Maria Ester Marin Catorce
  - Representative: Ferdinand "Dinand" Ledesma Hernandez
  - City Council: Members: Maylene May S. Bascon; Handel Dee R. Cadellino-Cubilo; Edwin G. Abris; Mark Lapidez; Eina Carcel Jumilla Pama; Bernardo B. Hinay; Chow Rodriguez; Ellen Grace Subere Albios; Margaret O. Subaldo; Suellen C. Ogena
  - Electorate: 126,262 voters (2025)

Area
  - Total: 277.00 km^{2} (106.95 sq mi)
- Elevation: 333 m (1,093 ft)
- Highest elevation: 2,271 m (7,451 ft)
- Lowest elevation: 7 m (23 ft)

Population (2024 census)
  - Total: 201,844
  - Density: 728.68/km^{2} (1,887.3/sq mi)
  - Households: 50,814
- Demonym(s): Koronadaleños; Marbeleños

Economy
  - Income class: 1st city income class
  - Poverty incidence: 8.17% (2023)
  - Revenue: ₱ 1,557 million (2024)
  - Assets: ₱ 3,637 million (2024)
  - Expenditure: ₱ 1,434 million (2024)
  - Liabilities: ₱ 765.9 million (2024)

Service provider
  - Electricity: South Cotabato 1 Electric Cooperative (SOCOTECO 1)
- Time zone: UTC+8 (PST)
- ZIP code: 9506
- PSGC: 126306000
- IDD : area code: +63 (0)83
- Native languages: Hiligaynon; Cebuano; Maguindanao; Blaan; Tagalog
- Website: koronadal.gov.ph

Koronadal, officially the City of Koronadal (Hiligaynon: Syudad sang Koronadal; Cebuano: Dakbayan sa Koronadal; Ilocano: Siudad ti Koronadal; Maguindanaon: Kuta nu Kurunadal, Filipino: Lungsod ng Koronadal) and also known as Marbel, is a component city and capital of the province of South Cotabato, Philippines. According to the 2024 census, it has a population of 201,844 people.

Koronadal is the capital city of the province of South Cotabato and serves as the regional administrative center of Soccsksargen (Region XII). It is also the second most populous city in both South Cotabato and the entire Soccsksargen region, following General Santos.

Koronadal is one of the two cities in Mindanao with a predominantly Hiligaynon-speaking population, comprising approximately 95% of its residents. In 2003 and 2005 the city was recognized as "Most Competitive City" in the small-city category, and in 2005 and 2006 as the most business friendly city in Mindanao.

== Etymology ==
The word Koronadal is popularly thought to have come from the B'laan words kolon “cogon grass” (Imperata cylindrica), and datal “plain”, which aptly described the place to natives. On the other hand, Marbel, which refers to the población, is from the Blaan term marb el "murky waters", in reference to the referring to the Marbel River.

== History ==
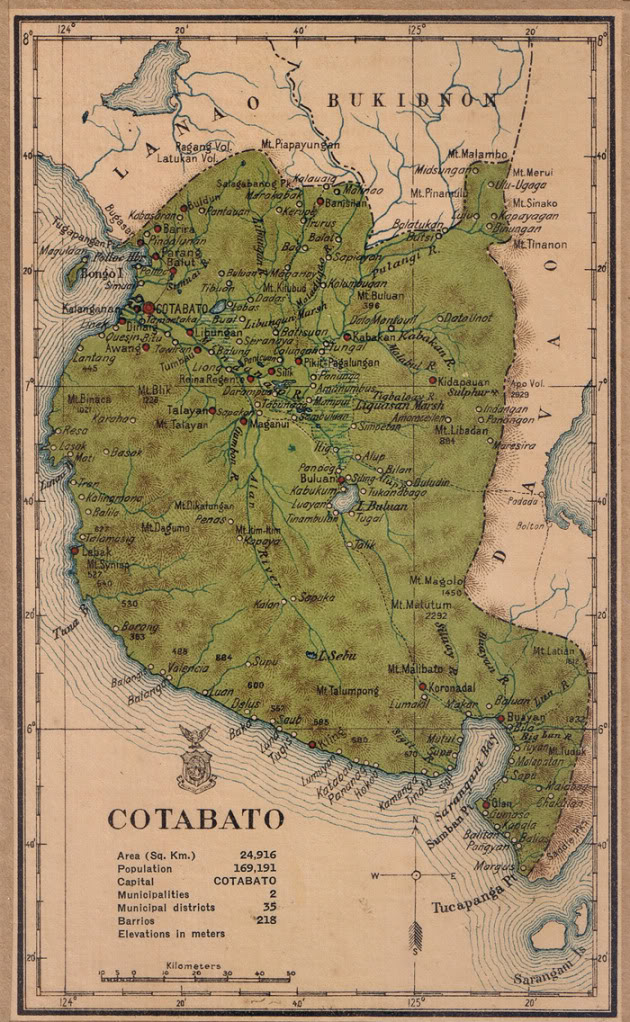
Cotabato province 1918 map

The area was first settled by the Blaan and Maguindanao. Koronadal once comprised the area from the banks of Buluan Lake in the north to Barangay Polonoling in the municipality of Tupi, South Cotabato to the south, and from the Quezon mountain range to the northeast to the municipality of T'boli, South Cotabato to the southeast.

It was on August 18, 1947, when President Manuel Roxas signed Executive Order No. 82, creating the municipalities in the entire province of Cotabato, one of which was Marbel. The same executive order likewise mandated the official function of the municipal government which began after the qualification and election of the first set of municipal officials.

The municipal government of Koronadal began its official function on January 1, 1948, with an approved Annual Estimated Budget of ₱30,000.00 (equivalent to ₱3,711,923 in 2021). At that time, the land area of the municipality encompassed the present-day municipalities of Banga, Lake Sebu, Norala, Santo Niño, Surallah, T'Boli, Tampakan, and Tupi in South Cotabato, as well as Isulan in Sultan Kudarat. It became the provincial capital of South Cotabato, which was created under Republic Act No. 4849 on July 18, 1966.

Municipal Council Resolution No. 32, Series of 1948 mandated and proclaimed January 10 as the annual town fiesta commemorating the foundation of Marbel Settlement District of the National Land Settlement.

=== Cityhood ===
Koronadal was converted into a component city of South Cotabato by virtue of Republic Act No. 8803 on October 8, 2000.

At present, Koronadal is a fast-developing growth center composed of twenty-seven barangays including the four zones in the población. Being the capital city of South Cotabato, it is the center of the province in terms of political, cultural and socio-economic activities.By virtue of Executive Order No. 304 signed by President Gloria Macapagal Arroyo, Koronadal was named the new regional political and socio-economic center of Soccsksargen on March 30, 2004, with regional departments, bureaus and offices ordered to move from Cotabato City.

== Geography ==
Koronadal is located in the northeastern part of South Cotabato province, positioned between approximately 6°24' to 6°34' north latitude and 124°47' to 124°58' east longitude. The city is bordered to the north by the Municipality of Lutayan, Sultan Kudarat; to the northwest by the Municipality of Tantangan; to the northeast by the Municipality of Columbio, Sultan Kudarat; to the south by the Municipality of Tupi, to the southwest by the Municipality of Banga; and to the southeast by the Municipality of Tampakan.

The city's landscape features a combination of flatlands and gently sloping terrain, with approximately 50.18% of its total land area classified as predominantly flat. It is flanked by the Roxas and Quezon mountain ranges, whose elevations reach between 700 and 800 meters above sea level and gradually slope downward toward the city center.

=== Barangays ===
Koronadal City is politically subdivided into 27 Barangays, and each barangays consists of Puroks while some have Sitios.

According to the Philippine Statistics Authority, there are 17 Barangays classified as Urban (highlighted in bold) and the rest are classified as Rural.

- Assumption (Bulol)
- **Avanceña (Barrio III)**
- Cacub
- **Caloocan**
- **Carpenter Hill**
- **Concepcion (Barrio VI)**
- Esperanza
- **General Paulino Santos (Barrio I)**
- Mabini
- Magsaysay
- Mambucal
- **Morales**
- Namnama
- New Pangasinan (Barrio IV)
- **Paraiso**
- Rotonda
- **San Isidro**
- San Roque
- **San Jose (Barrio V)**
- **Santa Cruz**
- **Santo Niño (Barrio II)**
- **Saravia (Barrio VIII)**
- **Topland (Barrio VII / Zulueta)**
- **Zone I (Poblacion)**
- **Zone II (Poblacion)**
- **Zone III (Poblacion)**
- **Zone IV (Poblacion)**

=== Climate ===
Climate data for Koronadal City, South Cotabato
Month	Jan	Feb	Mar	Apr	May	Jun	Jul	Aug	Sep	Oct	Nov	Dec	Year
Mean daily maximum °C (°F)	31 (88)	31 (88)	32 (90)	32 (90)	31 (88)	30 (86)	29 (84)	30 (86)	30 (86)	30 (86)	30 (86)	31 (88)	31 (87)
Mean daily minimum °C (°F)	23 (73)	23 (73)	23 (73)	24 (75)	24 (75)	24 (75)	24 (75)	24 (75)	24 (75)	24 (75)	24 (75)	23 (73)	24 (74)
Average precipitation mm (inches)	64 (2.5)	45 (1.8)	59 (2.3)	71 (2.8)	140 (5.5)	179 (7.0)	192 (7.6)	198 (7.8)	163 (6.4)	147 (5.8)	113 (4.4)	66 (2.6)	1,437 (56.5)
Average rainy days	12.2	10.3	12.7	15.7	26.0	27.4	28.1	28.2	26.0	26.7	22.9	16.6	252.8
Source: Meteoblue (modeled/calculated data, not measured locally)

The climate of Koronadal is mild and sub-tropical, belonging to climate Type IV. The place is typhoon free. Rainy months are from June to October.

== Demographics ==
Population census of Koronadal

Year	Pop.	±% p.a.
1918	13,957	—
1939	19,651	+1.64%
1948	53,563	+11.79%
1960	32,437	−4.09%
1970	54,413	+5.30%
1975	62,764	+2.90%
1980	80,566	+5.12%
1990	108,738	+3.04%

Year	Pop.	±% p.a.
1995	118,231	+1.58%
2000	133,786	+2.69%
2007	149,622	+1.55%
2010	158,273	+2.07%
2015	174,942	+1.93%
2020	195,398	+2.35%
2024	201,844	+0.78%

Source: Philippine Statistics Authority

=== Ethnicity ===
The vast majority of the Koronadal's inhabitants descended from ethnic Hiligaynon migrants from Panay (mainly Iloilo) and Negros Occidental. However, there are other non-native ethnolinguistic groups reside in the city, such as Cebuanos, Ilocanos, and Pangasinans (who both inhabit Barrio IV, also called New Pangasinan, named after their migrant ancestors' province of origin), Bicolanos, Kapampangans, Tagalogs, and Warays, making Koronadal a melting pot of cultures, languages and traditions. The first inhabitants of the city were the indigenous B'laans, T'bolis and Muslim Maguindanaons, who became minorities but significant pluralities in the city today since the early 20th century due to migrations from Luzon and Visayas seeking better opportunities in Mindanao, mainly from agriculture.

=== Language ===
The main language of Koronadal is Hiligaynon, earning the city its nickname "the Ilonggo Capital of Mindanao". Tagalog, Ilocano and Cebuano are also widely spoken, with the former being the city's secondary lingua franca, while Maguindanaon, Maranao, English, and Arabic are also heard in the city Blaan and T'boli are also spoken by the ethnic groups of the same names who also reside in Koronadal.

=== Religion ===
==== Roman Catholicism ====
Roman Catholicism is the largest religious affiliation in Koronadal. The city is under the jurisdiction of the Diocese of Marbel, which covers the provinces of South Cotabato and Sarangani. According to the Catholic Bishops' Conference of the Philippines, the Diocese of Marbel served around 1.67 million Catholics as of 2021. Koronadal hosts several Catholic parishes, including the Christ the King Cathedral.

==== Islam ====
Islam is the second-largest religious group in the city. It is practiced primarily by Muslim communities with roots among the Maguindanaon, Iranun, and other ethnolinguistic groups from nearby provinces, including converts to Islam known as Balik Islam. The city has several mosques, including the Koronadal Grand Mosque, and is part of the broader religious and cultural corridor that links Muslim communities in Mindanao.

==== Other Christian Denominations ====
Koronadal has a significant population belonging to various Protestant and non-Catholic Christian denominations. These include:

- The United Methodist Church (UMC)
- Iglesia ni Cristo
- Seventh-day Adventist Church
- Southern Baptist Convention (SBC)
- Evangelical Christian fellowships
- The Church of Jesus Christ of Latter-day Saints (LDS)
- Members Church of God International (Ang Dating Daan)

These groups operate multiple churches and congregations throughout the city.

==== Indigenous and Traditional Religions ====
Koronadal is part of the ancestral domain of indigenous peoples such as the B'laan and T'boli. While many indigenous residents have adopted Christianity or Islam, some continue to practice elements of traditional animist beliefs, often in parallel with mainstream religions.

CHURCH	LOCATION	BARANGAY
Christ the King Cathedral Saint Anthony of Padua Parish	Rafael Alunan Avenue	Barangay Zone III (Poblacion)
Our Lady of the Rosary Parish	Pioneer Settlers Avenue	Barangay Santa Cruz
Sagrada Pamilya Parish	Koronadal - Columbio Road	Barangay San Jose (Barrio V)
Sacred Heart of Jesus Chapel	Sergio Morales Avenue	Barangay General Paulino Santos (Barrio I)
San Miguel Arkanghel Chapel	General Paulino Santos Drive	Barangay Morales
Saint Michael Chapel	Quintin Paredes Street	Barangay Zone IV (Poblacion)
Our Lady of Hope Chapel	Passionist Seminary Road	Barangay Paraiso
Our Lady of Perpetual Help Chapel	OLPH Seminary Road	Barangay Zone II (Poblacion)
San Isidro Labrador Chapel	Rotonda - Topland Road	Barangay Rotonda
San Vicente Ferrer Chapel	Purok Maharlika Road	Barangay Saravia
Saint Peter Chapel	Koronadal - Tampakan Road	Barangay Concepcion (Barrio VI)
Santo Rosario Chapel	Koronadal - Tupi Road	Barangay Saravia
Our Lady of Fatima Chapel	De Los Reyes Street	Barangay Morales
San Jose Chapel	Seromines 1st Avenue	Barangay Caloocan
Seventh-Day Adventist Church	General Paulino Santos Drive	Barangay Zone IV (Poblacion)
Marbel Baptist Church (SBC)	Marcelo H. del Pilar Street	Barangay Zone IV (Poblacion)
Artesian Christian Fellowship (SBC)	Koronadal - Tampakan Road	Barangay San Roque
Southern Cathedral of Faith (SBC)	General Paulino Santos Drive	Barangay Zone II (Poblacion)
Bible Baptist Church (SBC)	Sergio Osmeña Street	Barangay Zone II (Poblacion)
Gathsemane Baptist Church (SBC)	Pioneer Settlers Avenue	Barangay Santa Cruz
Life-Changing International Ministries (SBC)	Koronadal - Tantangan Road	Barangay Morales
Barrio VI Baptist Church (SBC)	Koronadal - Tampakan Road	Barangay Concepcion
Igelsia Ni Cristo	General Paulino Santos Drive	Barangay Zone III (Poblacion)
Iglesia Ni Cristo	Koronadal - Tantangan Road	Barangay Morales
Iglesia Ni Cristo	Koronadal - Tupi Road	Barangay Saravia
Iglesia Ni Cristo	Koronadal - Tampakan Road	Barangay Concepcion
Members Church of God International	Pioneer Settlers Avenue	Barangay Santa Cruz
The Church of Jesus Christ of Latter-Day Saints	Sergio Osmeña Street	Barangay Zone I (Poblacion)
Church of God World Missions	New Pangasinan - Magsaysay Road	Barangay New Pagasinan
Koronadal Grand Mosque	Emilio Aguinaldo Street	Barangay Santa Cruz
Masjid Ibrahim Khalil	Koronadal - Tupi Road	Barangay Saravia
Masjid Al-Buisan	Koronadal - Columbio Road	Barangay General Paulino Santos
Masjid Al-Fuqarah	Pascual Street	Barangay General Paulino Santos
Masjid Balik-Islam	Crisologo Street	Barangay Morales
Masjid Marbel	Juan Posadas Street	Barangay Zone II (Poblacion)

== Economy ==
Poverty incidence of Koronadal (%)

Source: Philippine Statistics Authority

=== Retail and commercial ===
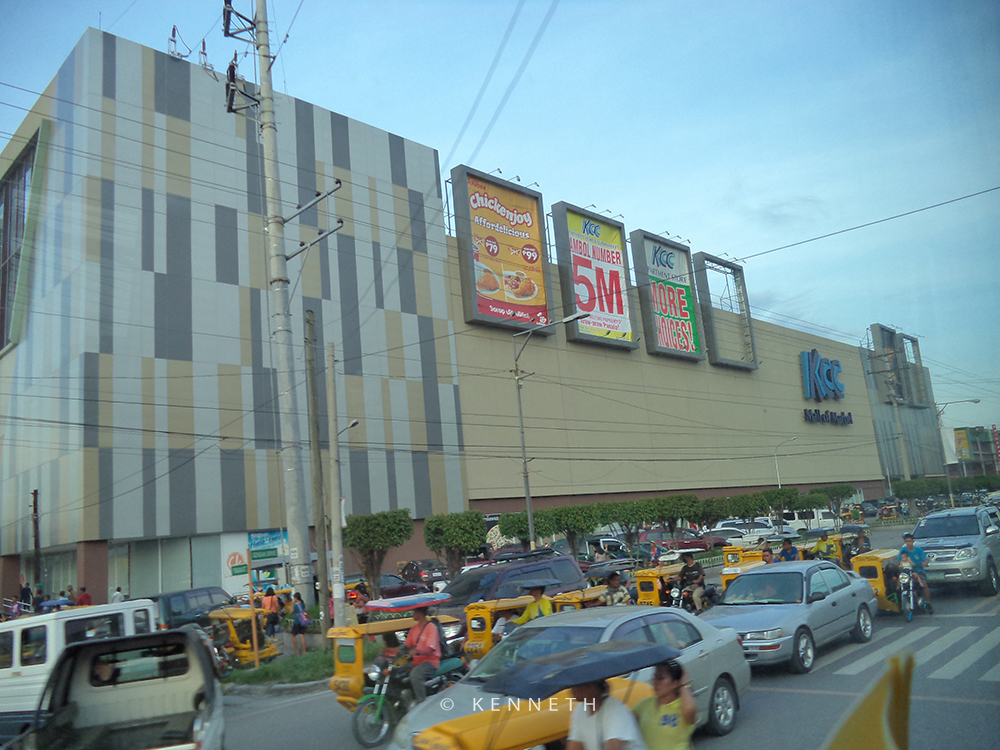
KCC Mall of Marbel in 2015

Koronadal is home to several major shopping malls, which includes Mall of Ace Centerpoint, Gaisano Grand Koronadal by the Gaisano Grand Group of Companies, CityMall Koronadal by DoubleDragon Corporation, and the homegrown Mindanao wide mall chain, KCC Mall of Marbel by KCC Malls. These establishments serve as key retail destinations, contributing significantly to the city's tourism and economic activities. In addition to these large malls, Koronadal also hosts a variety of locally owned, smaller shopping establishments, further solidifying its role as the primary shopping hub for South Cotabato and surrounding municipalities and provinces. The city is further poised for retail growth, as Robinsons Group, SM Prime, and Puregold Price Club, Inc. have acquired land for future development, which will enhance its status as the primary shopping hub for South Cotabato and the surrounding municipalities and provinces.

== Government ==
Koronadal officially became a component city on October 8, 2000, following the ratification of Republic Act No. 8803 through a plebiscite. Since its conversion into a city, the City Government of Koronadal has taken full responsibility for overseeing its political governance, as well as driving socio-cultural and economic development initiatives. The local government has since implemented various programs and policies aimed at improving public services, infrastructure, education, healthcare, and investment promotion, positioning Koronadal as a key urban center in the Soccsksargen region.

Incumbent Officials:

- Mayor: Erlinda P. Araquil (Since 2026–present)
- Vice Mayor: Maria Ester M. Catorce (Since 2026–present)

List of Mayors and Vice Mayors
Year	Mayor	Vice Mayor	Notes
1940 1941	Jesus M. Larrabaster	-	The Marbel Settlement District was created under the Commonwealth Act #441 dated on June 3, 1939. Larrabaster was appointed as the overseer.
1941 - 1943	Bai Luma Panat	-	Panat was the first Municipal District Mayor appointed by Colonel Dionisio Gutierrez.
1943 - 1947	Sergio B. Morales	-	Morales was appointed by Brigadier General Salipada Pendatun.
1947 - 1951	Kudanding I. Kamsa	Perfecto Sueno Sr.	The Municipal District of Marbel was recognized as the seat of government for the Municipality of Koronadal which was established on August 18, 1947, through Executive Order #82. Kamsa was appointed by President Manuel Roxas.
1951 - 1955	Hilario de Pedro Sr.	Venancio Magbanua	The first local election in Koronadal was held. De Pedro was the first elected Municipal Mayor.
1955 - 1959	Hilario de Pedro Sr.	Venancio Magbanua	
1959 - 1963	Arturo Rojas Sr.	Venancio Magbanua	
1963 - 1967	Arturo Rojas Sr.	Frederico M. Dizon Sr.	Koronadal was designated as the provincial capital of the newly created South Cotabato Province through the Republic Act #4949 section 3 on July 18, 1966.
1967-1972	Arturo Rojas Sr.	Frederico M. Dizon Sr.	
1972-1975	Gerardo T. Calaliman	Frederico M. Dizon Sr.	
1975 - 1980	Gerardo T. Calaliman	Ismael D. Sueno	
1980 - 1986	Ismael D. Sueno	Lolita P. Valenzuela	The first local election since the declaration of Martial Law.
1986-1988	Hilario L. de Pedro III	Fernando Q. Miguel	
1988 - 1992	Fernado Q. Miguel	Renato V. Orocio	First local election under the new Constitution.
1992 - 1995	Fernado Q. Miguel	Nenita M. Tan	
1995 - 1998	Fernado Q. Miguel	Mercelita M. Lucido	
1998 - 2001	Vicente R. de Jesus	Jose C. Ledda Jr.	The Municipality of Koronadal was converted into a City by the Republic Act #8803 dated on August 16, 2000. De Jesus was the first City Mayor.
2001 - 2004	Fernando Q. Miguel	Jose C. Ledda Jr.	Koronadal was awarded as the Most Competitive Small City in the Philippines in 2003. Executive Order #304 designates Koronadal City as the Regional Center and Seat of the Soccsksargen by President Gloria Macapagal Arroyo issued on March 30, 2004.
2004 - 2007	Fernando Q. Miguel	Jose C. Ledda Jr.	Koronadal was awarded as one of the Most Competitive Small Cities in the Philippines in 2005, and also the Most Business Friendly City in Mindanao in 2005 and 2006.
2007 - 2010	Fernando Q. Miguel	Vicente R. de Jesus	
2010 - 2013	Peter B. Miguel	Eliordo U. Ogena	
2013 - 2016	Peter B. Miguel	Eliordo U. Ogena	
2016 - 2019	Peter B. Miguel	Eliordo U. Ogena	
2019 - 2022	Eliordo U. Ogena	Peter B. Miguel	
2022 - 2025	Eliordo U. Ogena	Erlinda P. Araquil	The City of Koronadal was reclassified as a First Class Component City from its previous status as a Third Class Component City in March 2024 under the Republic Act #11964.
2025 - 2026	Eliordo U. Ogena	Erlinda P. Araquil	
2026–present	Erlinda P. Araquil	Maria Ester M. Catorce	Assumed the position due to the death of Ogena.

== Culture ==
Koronadal City is a melting pot of diverse traditions where indigenous B'laan and T’boli heritage, Islamic culture, and Catholic faith thrive together in harmony. The T’boli people, known for their sacred T’nalak weaving and rich ancestral practices, share the land with the Maguindanaon Muslims, who brought Islamic faith and customs, and the Christian settlers, who introduced Catholic beliefs and celebrations during the resettlement era.

Today, these three cultures live side by side, maintaining their traditions and contributing to the identity of Koronadal. This heritage is featured during the T’nalak Festival, an event highlighting cultural diversity, peace, and the shared history of the people of South Cotabato.

=== Blaan and Tboli culture ===
The B'laan people are one of the indigenous peoples of the Southern Philippine island of Mindanao. Another tribe called the Maguindanao also inhabits the same area. The two tribes consider themselves to be brothers and sisters. Long ago, an Arab male (ancestral brother) married a B'laan female (ancestral sister) and through this marriage union, Islam arrived in Southern Mindanao so that when the Spaniards arrived, their attempts to establish Catholicism were unsuccessful in the south. Eventually the B'laan and the Maguindanao became trade partners with the B'laan settling in the mountains and the Maguindanao settling along the coastal areas. From that time until now, the B'laans have been producing rice, vegetables, livestock, and rainforest products. The original religion of the B'laan is Animist. Presently, only 5% of the 8,000 B'laan tribal people are considered to be evangelical.

The T’boli people are one of the indigenous tribes of South Cotabato, traditionally inhabiting the highlands surrounding Lake Sebu. They are known for their rich traditions, colorful attire, and deep spiritual connection with nature. Historically, the T’boli were animists who practiced rituals to honor nature spirits and ancestors. Their culture is best expressed through T’nalak weaving, a sacred art using abaca fibers. T’nalak is considered a spiritual fabric, created by women weavers (called dreamweavers) who receive the designs through dreams believed to come from Fu Dalu, the goddess of abaca.

Koronadal, now the capital of South Cotabato, was once a part of the B'laan and T’boli ancestral domain before Christian settlers migrated during the 1930s–1950s resettlement programs. Despite modernization, the B'laan and T’boli tribes have preserved their identity through festivals, music (such as hegalong and kulintang), and crafts. Today, their culture continues to thrive and is celebrated in events like the T’nalak Festival, symbolizing unity among indigenous and settler communities in Koronadal and the whole province.

=== Maguindanaon culture ===
Before the arrival of Christian settlers in the 1930s, Koronadal and much of South Cotabato were part of the ancestral homeland of the Maguindanaon and other Muslim ethnolinguistic groups. Islam reached Mindanao in the 14th century through Arab traders and missionaries, leading to the establishment of the Maguindanao Sultanate in the 16th century. This sultanate governed large parts of Mindanao, including the Koronadal Valley.

The Maguindanaon people traditionally practiced Islamic customs such as prayer (salah), fasting (sawm) during Ramadan, and halal food preparation, while maintaining strong cultural expressions through kulintang music, traditional dances, and colorful attire like the malong. Their governance system was guided by Sharia principles alongside traditional laws (adat).

When the Philippine government initiated the National Land Settlement Administration in the 1930s, Christian settlers from Luzon and Visayas migrated to Koronadal, gradually reducing the Muslim population in the area. Despite this demographic change, Islamic culture remains vibrant in Koronadal today through mosques, madrasah schools, halal businesses, and community celebrations of Eid’l Fitr and Eid’l Adha.

=== Catholic culture ===
The Catholic Filipinos make up the great majority (over 70%) of the Southern Philippine population. They are relatively newcomers to the area; the first wave of Christian migrants came in the seventeenth century when the Spaniards sought to populate Zamboanga, Jolo, Dapitan and other areas by encouraging people from Luzon and the Visayas to settle there. In the nineteenth century Spanish policy found considerable success in encouraging migrations to Iligan and Cotabato.

The Americans continued this pattern during their colonial administration. In 1913 the American colonial government provided resources for the establishment of agricultural colonies in Mindanao. By the time the Philippine Commonwealth was established, Mindanao had become a veritable frontier. Wave upon wave of migrants poured into the region, chiefly among them the Hiligaynons, Cebuanos, Ilocanos, and Kapampangans. These people did much to clear the virgin areas of Mindanao and open them to extensive agriculture and industry.

Catholicism in Koronadal traces its roots to the 1930s–1950s National Land Settlement Administration program, which brought Christian settlers from Luzon and Visayas to the fertile Koronadal Valley. These migrants introduced Catholic traditions, values, and practices, blending them with local customs.

The first Catholic missionaries, primarily from the Oblates of Mary Immaculate and other religious congregations, established parishes and schools to serve the growing Christian population. The construction of the Christ the King Cathedral became a significant milestone, symbolizing the central role of Catholic faith in the city's development.

Catholic culture shaped Koronadal's community life through fiestas, processions, and devotions to Santo Niño and Saint Anthony of Padua. Today, major celebrations like Feast of Christ the King and Holy Week traditions remain integral to the city's identity, reflecting the enduring influence of Catholicism in its social and cultural fabric.

=== Events ===
Koronadal also hosted an international activity called Pyesta Kalon Datal: Koronadal International Folkloric Festival in coordination with Conseil international des organisations de festivals de folklore et d'arts traditionnels or the International Council of Organizations of Folklore Festivals and Folk Art (CIOFF) last August 10 to 18, 2015 and August 11 to 18, 2018 and several national activities such as the Palarong Pambansa in 1996 with General Santos and solo in 2007, Mindanao Business Forum, and National Schools Press Conference. On June 12, 2009, President Gloria Macapagal Arroyo together with Defense Secretary Gibo Teodoro celebrated the 111th Independence Day in the city, which marks a significant and historic event in the history of Koronadal.

==== Festivals ====
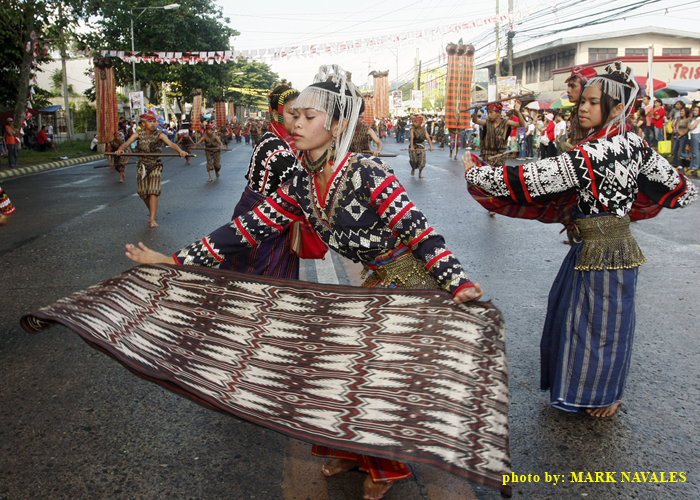
T'nalak Festival

- Hinugyaw Festival (January 8–10) – is an annual cultural celebration the marks the city's foundation anniversary as a municipality. The word “hinugyaw” comes from Ilonggo, meaning “rejoicing” or “jubilation.” The festival combines thanksgiving for a bountiful harvest, honors for early settlers including indigenous peoples, especially the B'laan tribe, and recognition of historical figures and martyrs.
- T'nalak Festival (July 16–18) – the festival honors the province's founding anniversary and highlights the rich heritage of the T’boli people, known for their traditional T’nalak cloth woven from abaca fibers. The T’nalak, characterized by intricate patterns inspired by the weavers’ dreams, symbolizes the blending of culture, strength and unity of the various ethnic groups of the B'laan and T'boli tribes, the Moros, and the Christians living in the province.
- Charter Anniversary (October 1–8) – celebrates the city-hood of Koronadal highlighted by "Negosyo Festival" showcasing the vibrancy of business and other economic enterprises in the City of Koronadal; consumers enjoy month-long citywide grand sale as participating business establishments give discounts of up to 70% off their regular prices on goods or services.

== Tourism ==
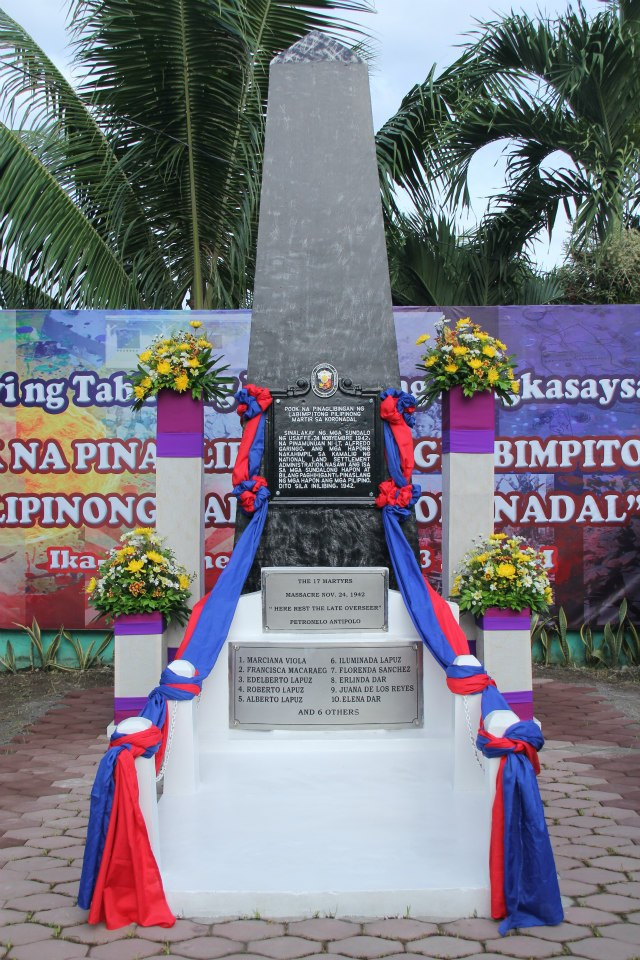
Historical marker for the burial site of the Seventeen Martyrs of Koronadal

=== Museums ===
- National Museum of the Philippines - SOCCSKSARGEN
- Notre Dame of Marbel University Museum
- South Cotabato Museum
- Tantoco Memorial Showcase

=== Shrines ===
- Albert Morrow and Santiago Odi Memorial Shrine
- Filipino – Japanese Memorial Shrine
- Historical Marker of the Seventeen Martyrs

=== Libraries ===
- Koronadal City Library
- Notre Dame of Marbel University Library

=== Parks ===
- B'lok Creek Esplanade
- Rizal Park
- People's Park
- Bong Gumne de Muhon
- Damweng Dmatal
- General Paulino Santos Roundball
- General Santos Drive Linear Park and Bike lane

=== Waterfalls ===
- Cabillon Falls, Barangay Cacub
- Saravia Falls, Barangay Saravia
- Siok Falls, Barangay Mabini
- Supon Falls, Barangay San Jose

=== Eco-resorts ===
- El Gawel Zoo
- Mambucal Hot Spring
- Paraiso Verde Water Park

=== Malls ===
- CityMall Koronadal (Opened on November 8, 2017)
- Fit Mart Mall of Marbel (Closed on September 1, 2011)
- Gaisano Grand Koronadal (Opened on December 8, 2011)
- KCC Mall of Marbel (Opened on August 8, 1947)
- Mall of Ace Centerpoint (Opened on March 1, 1961)
- Robinsons Koronadal (2027)
- SM City Koronadal (2028)

=== Estate Communities ===
- Camella Aurentia by Vista Land
- Camella Homes by Vista Land
- Camella Prima by Vista Land
- Carpenter Hills Residences
- Centro Verde by Sta. Lucia Land
- Futura Homes by Filinvest

== Healthcare ==
Koronadal serves as a central hub for healthcare in the region, offering a diverse array of facilities to ensure accessible services for all residents. The City Health Office, located on Alunan Avenue, provides a wide variety of essential health services tailored to the needs of the community. In addition to hospitals and clinics, the city features numerous laboratories that deliver critical diagnostic support. Koronadal is also home to the Department of Health (DOH) Center for Health Development Soccsksargen located in Barangay Paraiso, further solidifying its status as a regional center for healthcare services and administration.

Major Tertiary Hospitals in the City of Koronadal:

HOSPITAL	LOCATION	BARANGAY
Allah Valley Medical Specialists' Center	General Paulino Santos Drive	Barangay Zone III Poblacion
Dr. Arturo P. Pingoy Medical Center	General Paulino Santos Drive	Barangay Zone IV Poblacion
Manuel C. Callejo - City of Koronadal Infirmary Hospital	Santo Niño - San Jose Road	Barangay Rotonda
Saint Agustine Infirmary Hospital	Guadalupe Road	Barangay Carpenter Hill
Socomedics Medical Center	Judge Alba Avenue	Barangay Zone III Poblacion
South Cotabato Provincial Hospital	Emilio Aguinaldo Street	Barangay Zone III Poblacion

== Education ==
Education in Koronadal is widely accessible to its residents through a well-established network of institutions. The city hosts numerous primary, elementary, and secondary schools, encompassing both public and private establishments, ensuring comprehensive educational opportunities for its community.

The City Schools Division Office is based in Barangay Zone III and continues to work closely with the local government to support school infrastructure, teacher development, and learner welfare across Koronadal.

=== Elementary and high schools ===
The list below shows some prominent secondary and elementary schools present in the city:

- Dolores Peneza Montessori Academy Inc.
- King's College of Marbel, Inc.
- Koronadal National Comprehensive High School
- Koronadal Central Elementary School I
- Koronadal Central Elementary School II
- Koronadal Southern Elementary School
- Maryland School
- Marymount School
- Notre Dame - Siena School of Marbel
- Notre Dame of Marbel University - Integrated Basic Education Department
- Notre Dame of San Jose
- Philippine Science High School – SOCCSKSARGEN Region Campus
- St. Alexius College - Integrated School Department

=== Higher educational institutions ===
There are two universities in the city:

- Notre Dame of Marbel University
- University of the Philippines Manila - School of Health Sciences – Koronadal City Campus

Other colleges are also vibrant in the education business. The list below shows the tertiary level schools present in the city:

- ACLC College of Marbel
- Goldenstate College – Marbel
- Green Valley College Foundation Incorporated
- King's College of Marbel, Inc.
- Korbel College
- Marbel Institute of Technology College
- Marvelous College of Technology, Inc.
- Ramon Magsaysay Memorial Colleges – Marbel
- Regency Polytechnic College
- St. Alexius College
- SITE Dizon
- STI College – Koronadal
- SouthPhil Institute of Technology, Inc.

=== Seminaries ===
Koronadal is also home to two seminaries, the Our Lady of Perpetual Help Seminary or locally known as OLPHS and the Saint Gabriel College Seminary run by the Passionist Fathers which is located at Purok San Gabriel, Barangay Zone III (Poblacion).

== Transportation ==
=== Land ===
==== Public Utility Vehicle ====
Popular mode of public transportation in the city are the tricycles which was divided in 2021 into 4 cluster routes:

- Red cluster – Northern Barangays
  - Avanceña (Barrio III)
  - Caloocan
  - part of General Paulino Santos (Barrio I)
  - part of Morales
  - Zone I (Poblacion)
  - San Jose (Barrio V)
- Yellow cluster – Eastern Barangays
  - Cacub
  - Concepcion (Barrio VII)
  - Esperanza
  - General Paulino Santos (Barrio I)
  - Mabini
  - Magsaysay
  - New Pangasinan (Barrio IV)
  - Zone II (Poblacion)
  - Rotonda
  - San Roque
  - Santo Niño (Barrio II)
  - Topland (Barrio VII / Zulueta)
- Green cluster – Southern Barangays
  - Assumption (Bulol)
  - Carpenter Hill
  - Mambucal
  - Zone III (Poblacion)
  - Santa Cruz
  - San Isidro
  - Saravia (Barrio VIII)
- Blue cluster – Western Barangays
  - Morales
  - Paraiso
  - Zone IV (Poblacion)

In accordance with the Public Utility Vehicle Modernization Program of the Philippine government, the government of Koronadal launched on 2022 the 10 routes that will serve the city:

Route	Destination	Notes
Route 1	San Jose - Downtown via Public Market Terminal	Future route
Route 2	Saravia - Downtown via Public Market Terminal	Active route
Route 3	Topland - Downtown via Public Market Terminal	Future route
Route 4	San Roque - Downtown via Public Market Terminal	Future route
Route 5	Paraiso - Downtown via Public Market Terminal	Future route
Route 6	San Isidro - Downtown loop via the Integrated Public Transport Terminal	CW & CCW Active route
Route 7	Morales - Downtown via the Integrated Public Transport Terminal	Future route
Route 8	Downtown loop 1 via the Integrated Public Transport Terminal	CW & CCW Future route
Route 9	Downtown loop 2 via the Integrated Public Transport Terminal	CW & CCW Future route
	Tampakan - Downtown	Active route

==== Railway ====
Koronadal will house the Koronadal terminus station of the Mindanao Railway Phase Two which will involve a 150 km (93 mi) segment south of Phase 1 between the cities of Digos and Koronadal, passing through General Santos.

=== Air ===
The nearest airport that serve Koronadal City is the General Santos International Airport in General Santos. Alternative airports like Francisco Bangoy International Airport in Davao City and the Cotabato Airport in Cotabato City are also accessible.

=== Sea ===
The nearest seaport that serve Koronadal is the Makar Wharf in General Santos. Alternative seaports like the Sasa Port in Davao City is also accessible.

== Notable personalities ==
- Nicolas Torre - Metropolitan Manila Development Authority (MMDA) general manager, former Philippine National Police chief
- Christian Perez - darts player
- Jason Sabio - footballer who plays for Kaya
- Kenneth Duremdes - PBA basketball player
- Ernestine Tiamzon - DLSU Lady Spiker
- Lovely Abella - GMA artist
- Orlando Quevedo - cardinal of a Roman Catholic church who served as an Archbishop Emeritus of Cotabato from 1998 to 2018. He was born and spent his very early years in Laoag, Ilocos Norte but was raised in Koronadal

== Sister cities ==
Luzon

- Mandaluyong
- Valenzuela

Visayas

- Iloilo City

Mindanao

- Cotabato City
- Ozamiz
- Pagadian
