= Notre Dame – Sienna School of Marbel =

Roman Catholic school in South Cotabato, Philippines

Coordinates: 6°29′51″N 124°50′30″E

Notre Dame - Siena School of Marbel is a Catholic institution in Koronadal City run by the Missionary Oblates of Mary Immaculate and Congregation of the Dominican Sisters of St. Catherine of Siena. ND-SSM has been a member of the Notre Dame Educational Association, a group of Notre Dame Schools in the Philippines under the patronage of the Blessed Virgin Mary.

== History ==
On June 23, 1946, Marbel received its first resident priest, Fr. Francis McSorley, OMI, the bishop of Sulu. He saw the need for and the value of a Catholic School in the midst of the growing community. Thus, on July 6, 1946, with the assistance from the RVM Sisters, he laid the foundation of Notre Dame of Marbel and was therefore, given credit as its founder and first director. Notre Dame of Marbel was coeducational at that time. The first group of Dominican Sisters of St. Catherine of Siena headed by the Prioress General, the late Mother Josefina Burgos, O.P. arrived on April 12, 1952.

The School Year 1952-1953 marked the first operation of Notre Dame of Marbel Girls’ Department under the administration of the Dominican Sisters of St. Catherine of Siena. The school expanded with the opening of the Grade School in 1955. It was in 1976 that the application was approved for a change of name from Notre Dame of Marbel Girls’ Department to its official name, Notre Dame of Marbel for Girls. In 1979-1980 Notre Dame of Marbel for Girls became an exclusive school for girls from Kindergarten to Fourth Year High School. In School Year 1995–1996, the school started accepting boys in the Grade School and likewise opened its doors to the First and Second Year Boys in School Year 1997–1998, thus changing the school's name Notre Dame of Marbel for Girls to Notre Dame of Marbel on August 22, 1997.

The school has implemented the Dominican St. Catherine of Siena Schools System Development (OPSS-SD) Program, which is an attempt at a radical living of the Gospel and a participation in the building of basic ecclesial communities in the diocese.

The OPSS-SD Program helped much in the development of the school especially in the preparation for the Philippine Association of Accredited Schools, Colleges and Universities (PAASCU) accreditation. The PAASCU Team visited the High School for Preliminary Survey on February 11–13, 1991. After its first formal visit on September 14–15, 1992, Notre Dame of Marbel High School was granted a certificate of accreditation for three years. It underwent its second formal visit last November 20–21, 1995 and was again granted an accreditation status for five (5) years. The Second Re-Accreditation Visit was scheduled on January 29–30, 2001 granting the school again an accreditation status for another five (5) years.

The Grade School Department passed the First Re-Accreditation Visit on February 17–18, 2000 and also the High School Department passed the Second Re-Accreditation Visit. Both departments were granted a Five-year accredited status (Level II) by PAASCU.

On November 21–22, 2003, the OP-Siena Golden Presence in Mindanao (Mindanao OP-Siena 50th Anniversary) was celebrated in Notre Dame of Marbel with the participation of other OP Siena Schools: Notre Dame of General Santos City, Notre Dame of Polomolok, Notre Dame of Lagao, Notre Dame of Tacurong for Girls, Notre Dame of Tulunan, Notre Dame of Jolo and Notre Dame of Cotabato. Life size statue of Mother Francisca Del Espiritu Santo and of St. Catherine of Siena were erected to mark the celebration. A portrait and canvas of the Foundress of the OP Siena Sisters was also unveiled.

A growing need for the distinctive identification of the institution from another Notre Dame school in the locality inspired another change in its title. In May 2004, and in accordance with the move of all other Dominican Notre Dame schools in Mindanao, the school's name was officially changed to Notre Dame-Siena School of Marbel (ND-SSM). The school applied for PAASCU accreditation for Basic Education and visited by the PAASCU Team on September 19–20, 2005. It was granted another Five-year accredited status (Level II) by the PAASCU.

The school took on a new official name approved by the Securities and Exchange Commission (SEC) Article Registry No. 88313. Effective March 5, 2004, then Notre Dame of Marbel (NDM) had officially become Notre Dame-Siena School of Marbel (ND-SSM). ND-SSM, took a step to a distinct identity away from the shadows of the neighboring schools.

The Board of Trustees granted ten percent (10%) increase in tuition and miscellaneous in SY 2007–2008.

The pre-school year workshop and in-service training were conducted every year by the management for teachers and staff to fresh set of ideas and to enhance not only their classroom instruction but basically their mere presence among students. They also took lessons on the art of questioning, effective teacher and creative teaching strategies as part of the pre in-service training. Many other seminars were attended to this school year and the previous years. Some of the teachers were also FAPE Trainers, FAPE-ESC Certificators and PAASCU Evaluators.

The entire faculty and staff have attended a Personnel Annual Retreat. The school has initiated an International Tour Program for Notre Dame-Siena School of Marbel personnel. On October 24–27, 2006 a group of personnel went for Three City Tour – Hong Kong, Macau, Zhuhai with them were two of our parents. Another group of personnel set out on a four-day educational tour (Lakbay Aral) in Hong Kong and Shenzhen, China. This was the second series tour overseas by another batch of delegates—the first group of personnel went to Thailand on October 27–31, 2003. The tour was an experience of a whole new environment and culture to which the personnel were exposed so they may open their minds to the reality of the world outside their immediate environment and somehow shared these experiences to their students.

By the end of the school year 2004–2005, the personnel went for a domestic tour in Cebu and Bohol. On April 3–7, 2008, the school personnel went to Tagbilaran, Bohol for a local tour.

ND-SSM enrolment is a matter of great importance for this administration as an institution that strives to survive in the midst of competition with other private schools in the locality and, very importantly, the economic regression affecting the families who send their children in the institution. In the past 10 years, the school has managed to somehow defeat the odds that brought a slump to student population since SY 1995–1996. From then on, statistics went up and lifted the spirit of the school. The sharpest rise in population yet since 2001 was in school year 2001–2002 with 0.78% increase. The trend continued this school year by another 1.32%. Finding no reason for sheer contentment, measures were plotted to maintain the slope on the positive as early as the third quarter.

Many of the enrollees enjoyed scholarships and financial assistance from the school's scholarship program, NGOs, benevolent individuals, foundations, publishing houses and ESC (government subsidy). School year 2007-2008 alone, the ESC granted ND-SSM a total of 165 scholarship slots, which is 33 more than that of 2003, for incoming first year students. Good facilities and the general conducive features of the school contribute to the favorable response to the invitations for enrolment by the would-be-client families. The educational system tops the overall package that the school offers. These features merit response from the alumni, parents, the friends, and benefactors of the school such that they also enjoy their participation in school activities and even in the outreach program of the Mother Francisca Community Assistance Center (MFCAC).

The ND-SSM organizes community service activities involving students, school personnel, parents, benefactors, and other volunteers. One such activity is a free medical and dental clinic held during the school's annual Foundress Day celebration for indigent residents of the MFCAC. The clinic provides medical and dental services, as well as medicines and vitamins donated by the St. Martin Foundation and the Family Council. Volunteers have included doctors, dentists, nurses, school personnel, students from the Red Cross Club, members of the Family Council, alumni, LMAMFES, and COMFES. In one reported event, at least 396 individuals received services through the program.

Other highlights are the very active support and involvement of the Family Council in the launching of the Pagpasidungog kay Mother Francisca Year, Family Rosary Crusade, the Family Day celebration and the "Halad" Christmas presentation of ND-SSM at the ProTech Center and in the City sponsored Christmas Festival every December and in the preparation and implementation of the ND-SSM's Five-year Strategic Plan.

The Mother Francisca Outreach Center also include in its highlights the putting up of the Day Care Center at the urban poor relocation area in San Isidro. The MFCAC staffs have been helping the handicapped members of the beneficiary community with the help of students, personnel, alumni and parents. The school has availed ESC slots from DepEd for the Kindergarten pupils for the Day Care Center. ND-SSM Participated and won the DepEd Search for Region XII Private Education Achievers and Quality Award 2008 Category B for Accredited Schools.

School Year: 2008-2009 marked the opening of the Night High School and school year 2009-2010 the opening of the Sunday High School. These programs are handled by the CCDC as one of the Education Programs offered by the Mother Francisca Outreach Center. The enrollees of the newly opened courses enjoy educational scholarship sponsored by alumni and benefactors. On July 10, 2009, during the T’nalak Opening Salvo the Drum and Lyre Corps of ND-SSM participated in the contest and garnered as champion among the seven schools in the South Cotabato who joined the contest.
