= Norala =

Municipality in South Cotabato, Philippines

- Municipality
- Municipality of Norala

Other transcription(s)
  - Jawi: نورالله
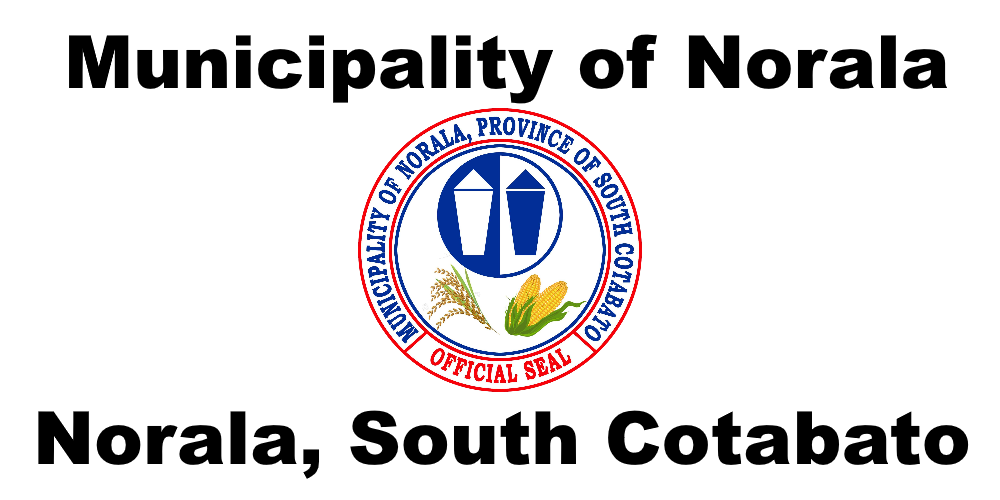
- Flag Seal
- Nicknames: "Land of the Dreamweavers" "Rice Bowl of the South"
- Motto: Mayad nga Norala, Mayad Gid
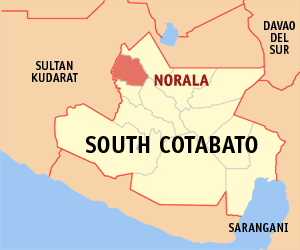
- Map of South Cotabato with Norala highlighted
- Interactive map of Norala
- Location within the Philippines
- Coordinates: 6°31′12″N 124°39′40″E
- Country: Philippines
- Region: Soccsksargen
- Province: South Cotabato
- District: 2nd district
- Barangays: 14 (see Barangays)

Government
  - Type: Sangguniang Bayan
  - Mayor: Clemente B. Fedoc
  - Vice Mayor: Victor Y. Balayon
  - Representative: Dibu S. Tuan
  - Electorate: 30,468 voters (2025)

Area
  - Total: 123.20 km^{2} (47.57 sq mi)
- Elevation: 103 m (338 ft)
- Highest elevation: 205 m (673 ft)
- Lowest elevation: 81 m (266 ft)

Population (2024 census)
  - Total: 48,499
  - Density: 393.66/km^{2} (1,019.6/sq mi)
  - Households: 11,385

Economy
  - Income class: 2nd municipal income class
  - Poverty incidence: 12.88% (2023)
  - Revenue: ₱ 207.6 million (2024)
  - Assets: ₱ 606.3 million (2024)
  - Expenditure: ₱ 199.8 million (2024)

Service provider
  - Electricity: South Cotabato 1 Electric Cooperative (SOCOTECO 1)
- Time zone: UTC+8 (PST)
- ZIP code: 9508
- PSGC: 1206311000
- IDD : area code: +63 (0)83
- Native languages: Hiligaynon; Cebuano; Maguindanao; Blaan; Tagalog; Karay-a
- Website: noralascot.gov.ph

Norala, officially the Municipality of Norala (Hiligaynon: Banwa sang Norala; Maguindanaon: Inged nu Nurala, Jawi: ايڠد نو نورالله; Kinaray-a: Banwa ka Norala; Cebuano: Lungsod sa Norala; Tagalog: Bayan ng Norala), is a municipality in the province of South Cotabato, Philippines. According to the 2024 census, it has a population of 48,499 people.

== History ==
Norala was created from portions of Dulawan, through Executive Order No. 572 signed by President Elpidio Quirino on March 10, 1953.

== Geography ==
=== Barangays ===
Norala is subdivided into 14 barangays. Each barangay consists of puroks while some have sitios.

- Dumaguil
- Esperanza
- Kibid
- Lapuz
- Liberty
- Lopez Jaena
- Matapol
- Poblacion
- Puti
- San Jose
- San Miguel
- Simsiman
- Tinago
- Benigno Aquino, Jr.

=== Climate ===
Climate data for Norala, South Cotabato
Month	Jan	Feb	Mar	Apr	May	Jun	Jul	Aug	Sep	Oct	Nov	Dec	Year
Mean daily maximum °C (°F)	30 (86)	31 (88)	31 (88)	31 (88)	30 (86)	29 (84)	29 (84)	29 (84)	30 (86)	30 (86)	30 (86)	30 (86)	30 (86)
Mean daily minimum °C (°F)	22 (72)	22 (72)	23 (73)	23 (73)	24 (75)	24 (75)	23 (73)	24 (75)	23 (73)	24 (75)	23 (73)	23 (73)	23 (74)
Average precipitation mm (inches)	64 (2.5)	45 (1.8)	59 (2.3)	71 (2.8)	140 (5.5)	179 (7.0)	192 (7.6)	198 (7.8)	163 (6.4)	147 (5.8)	113 (4.4)	66 (2.6)	1,437 (56.5)
Average rainy days	12.2	10.3	12.7	15.7	26.0	27.4	28.1	28.2	26.0	26.7	22.9	16.6	252.8
Source: Meteoblue

== Demographics ==
Population census of Norala
Year	Pop.	±% p.a.
1960	19,579	—
1970	34,131	+5.71%
1975	41,570	+4.03%
1980	47,397	+2.66%
1990	35,566	−2.83%
1995	39,688	+2.08%
2000	40,744	+0.56%
2007	44,070	+1.09%
2010	44,635	+0.46%
2015	46,642	+0.84%
2020	46,682	+0.02%
2024	48,499	+0.92%
Source: Philippine Statistics Authority

Blaan and Maguindanaon are the native inhabitants of the municipality.

== Economy ==
Poverty incidence of Norala (%)

Source: Philippine Statistics Authority
