= 2023 Mindanao earthquake =

2023 Mindanao earthquake may refer to:

- November 2023 Mindanao earthquake
- December 2023 Mindanao earthquake

== See also ==
- Mindanao earthquake (disambiguation)
- List of earthquakes in the Philippines
