= Mindanao earthquake =

Mindanao earthquake may refer to:

- 1897 Mindanao earthquakes
- 2002 Mindanao earthquake
- 2010 Mindanao earthquakes
- November 2023 Mindanao earthquake
- December 2023 Mindanao earthquake
- 2026 Mindanao earthquake
