= 1918 Celebes Sea earthquake =

Earthquake in the Philippines

- Location within Mindanao Location within Philippines
- UTC time: 1918-08-15 12:18:21
- ISC event: 913230
- USGS-ANSS: ComCat
- Local date: August 15, 1918
- Local time: 20:18
- Duration: >3 minutes
- Magnitude: 8.3 M_{w}
- Depth: 20 km (12 mi)
- Epicenter: 5.538°N 123.994°E
- Max. intensity: MMI X (Extreme)
- Tsunami: Yes
- Landslides: Yes
- Casualties: 52

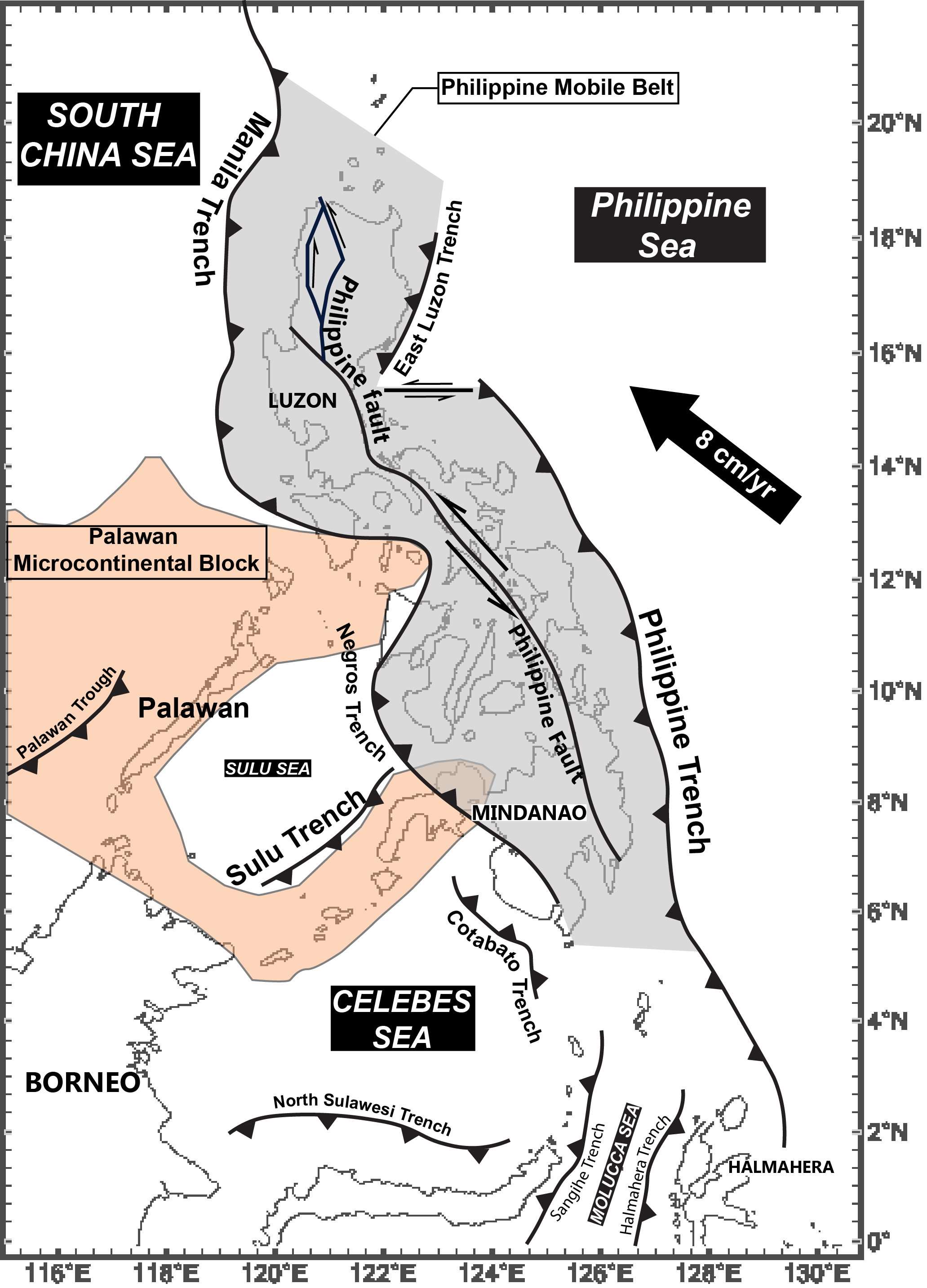
The Cotabato Trench in southern Mindanao and the Philippine Mobile Belt.

Near the Cotabato Trench, two of the largest 20th century Philippine earthquakes: the 1918 Celebes Sea earthquake (8.3 M_{w}) and the 1976 Moro Gulf earthquake (8.0 M_{w}). Also included is the recent 2002 Mindanao earthquake (7.5 M_{w}). The Moro Gulf, part of the Celebes Sea, is labeled for context.

The 1918 Celebes Sea earthquake occurred on August 15 at 12:18 UTC near the Moro Gulf coast of Mindanao. It had a magnitude of 8.3 on the moment magnitude scale and a maximum perceived intensity of X (Extreme) on the Mercalli intensity scale, making it the strongest earthquake in history to hit the Philippines. It triggered a tsunami of up to 7 m in height and the combined effects of the earthquake and tsunami led to the deaths of 52 people.

== Tectonic setting ==
The southwestern part of Mindanao sits above a geologically young subduction zone, where the section of the Sunda plate that lies beneath the Celebes Sea is subducting beneath the Philippines Mobile Belt along the line of the Cotabato Trench. The presence of the Cotabato subduction zone was confirmed by observations from the 1976 Moro Gulf earthquake.

== Earthquake ==
The earthquake had a magnitude of 8.3 on the moment magnitude scale, it had an estimated depth of 20 kilometers. The earthquake was 75 kilometers South southwest of Palimbang, Sultan Kudarat. A station at Butuan in northern Mindanao registered over 600 aftershocks before the end of August, with 250 recorded by the end of August 16.

The earthquake has been associated with rupture along the active east-dipping Cotabato Trench subduction zone beneath Mindanao. The epicenter is interpreted to be in the same part of the plate interface as the 1976 Moro Gulf event. The distribution of effects suggests that fault rupture extended for 200 km along the coast. The average slip is estimated to be 4.1 m.

== Tsunami ==
This event in the southern Philippines triggered a large tsunami, with a maximum run-up of 7.2 m, which affected the coasts of the Celebes Sea, causing widespread damage. The combined effects of the earthquake and the tsunami caused 52 casualties. With some sources stating that the tsunami alone caused up to 1,000 casualties.

== Damage ==
The earthquake caused widespread damage in the coastal parts of southwestern Mindanao, with all houses destroyed around Sarangani Bay. The effects of the earthquake were compounded by the tsunami that particularly affected 150 km of coast between Lebak and Glan. A major landslide was also reported from one of the mountains around Saragani Bay.

The number of casualties is uncertain as there is no definitive total. Several sources refer to 52 deaths.

The estimated losses were up to 5-25 million dollars. There was damage to a stone bridge at Paleleh, Central Sulawesi.

== See also ==
- 1897 Mindanao earthquakes
- 1976 Moro Gulf earthquake
- List of earthquakes in 1918
- List of earthquakes in the Philippines
