= 2023 Philippines earthquake =

2023 Philippines earthquake may refer to:

- November 2023 Mindanao earthquake
- December 2023 Mindanao earthquake

== See also ==
- List of earthquakes in the Philippines
