= 1976 Moro Gulf earthquake =

Earthquake in the Philippines

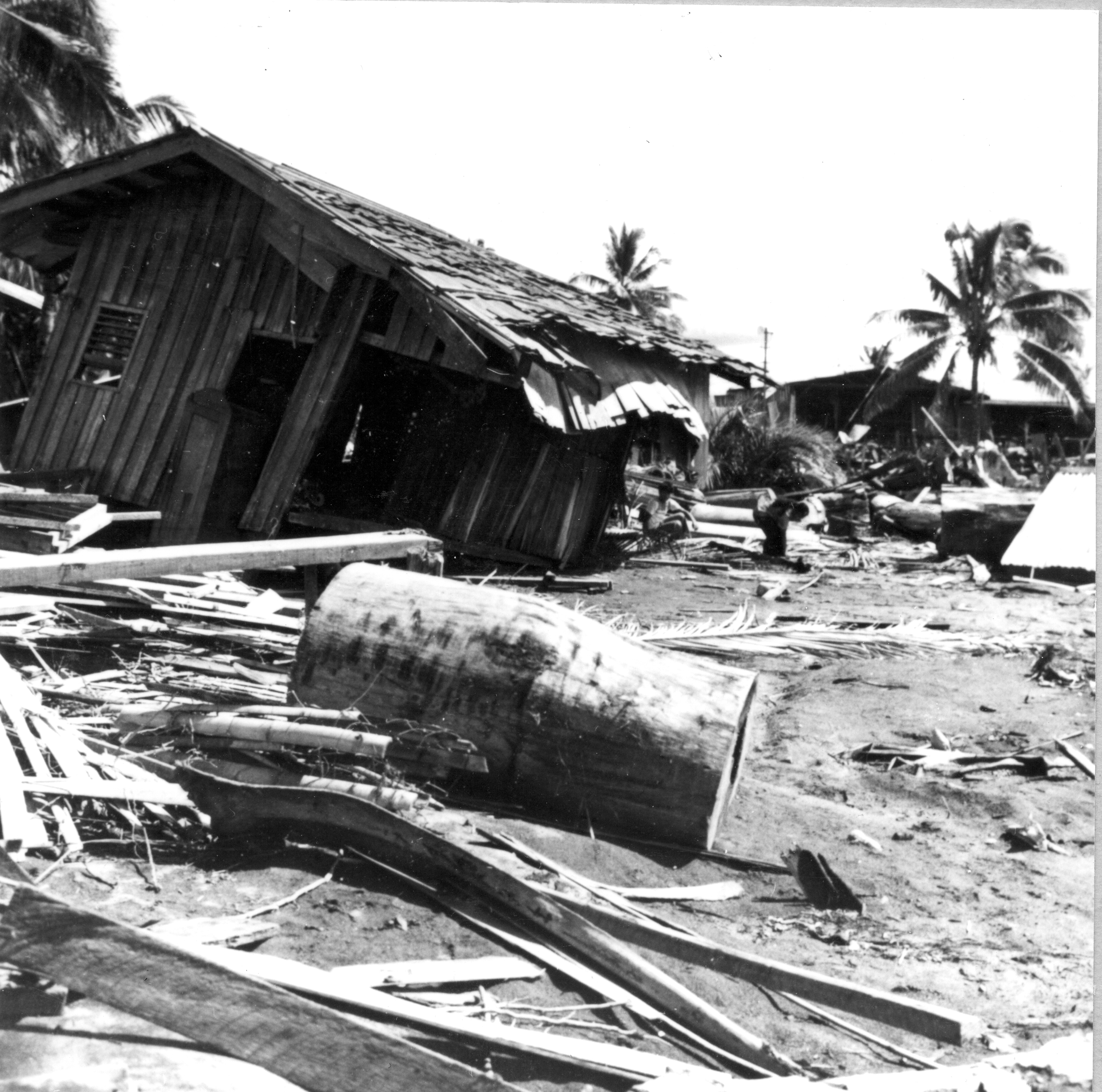
- Tsunami damage at Lebak, Mindanao

- UTC time: 1976-08-16 16:11:08
- ISC event: 709878
- USGS-ANSS: ComCat
- Local date: August 17, 1976
- Local time: 00:11:07
- Magnitude: 8.0 M_{w}
- Depth: 20 km (12 mi)
- Epicenter: 6.29°N 124.09°E
- Type: Megathrust
- Areas affected: Philippines
- Max. intensity: MMI VIII (PEIS VII)
- Tsunami: 15 m (49 ft)
- Casualties: 5,000–8,000 dead 10,000 injured 90,000 homeless

The 1976 Moro Gulf earthquake and tsunami occurred on August 17, 1976, at 00:11 local time near the islands of Mindanao and Sulu, in the Philippines. It measured 8.0 on the moment magnitude scale occurring at a depth of 20 km (12 mi). The earthquake was accompanied by a destructive tsunami that resulted in a majority of the estimated 5,000 to 8,000 fatalities. It was the deadliest earthquake in Philippines history and strongest earthquake in the Philippines in 58 years since the 1918 Celebes Sea earthquake.

== Tectonic summary ==
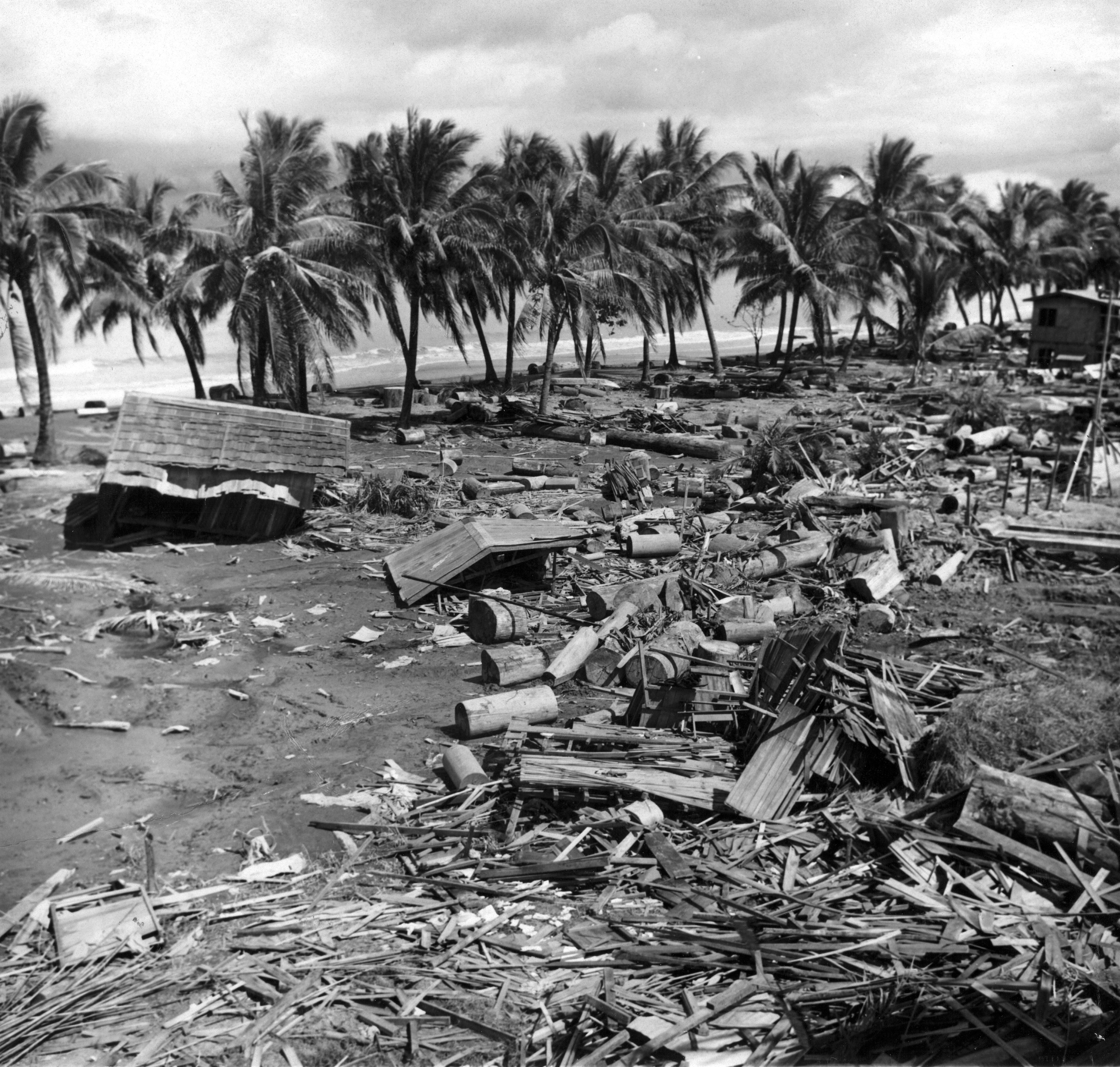
Tsunami damage at Barangay Tibpuan, Lebak, Mindanao

Several fault zones in the region are capable of producing major earthquakes and destructive local tsunamis. The two major fault zones that are most dangerous are the Sulu Trench in the Sulu Sea and the Cotabato Trench, a region of subduction that crosses the Celebes Sea and the Moro Gulf in Southern Mindanao. According to the PHIVOLCS historical catalog of earthquakes for the last 100 years, this region of the southern Philippines is characterized by moderate to high seismicity. The most recent earthquake along the Cotabato Trench region of subduction being the March 6, 2002, earthquake in Southern Mindanao.

== Earthquake ==
USGS ShakeMap

The earthquake occurred in an region where typical seismicity originates at 500 km (310 mi) depth on the Wadati–Benioff zones associated with subduction along the Sangihe and Mindanao islands. The Philippines is characterised by several complex and active subduction zones. The most geologically dominant in the region is the Philippine Trench located east of Mindanao. It dips to the west as represented by the Wadati–Benioff zone which can be detected to at least 200 km (120 mi).

The mainshock had a shallow focal depth and represented thrust faulting along a plane dipping northeast at a shallow angle. The shock in the North Celebes Sea was associated with the smaller Cotabato Trench; a north–south bathymetric feature along the island's coast where it meets the Moro Gulf. Geologists have interpreted the earthquake as evidence for east–northeast-dipping subduction beneath Mindanao. The feature is also thought to be geologically young due to the absence of an active volcanic arc. In 1918, a major earthquake and tsunami ruptured a segment of the subduction zone south of the 1976 earthquake; both earthquakes ruptured a combined 300 km (190 mi) of the trench. The rupture propagated northward from the epicenter along the Cotabato Trench, evident from the aftershock zone. However, the strongest aftershock, measuring M_{s} 6.8, was the result of strike-slip faulting and occurred away from the aftershock zone.

== Impact ==
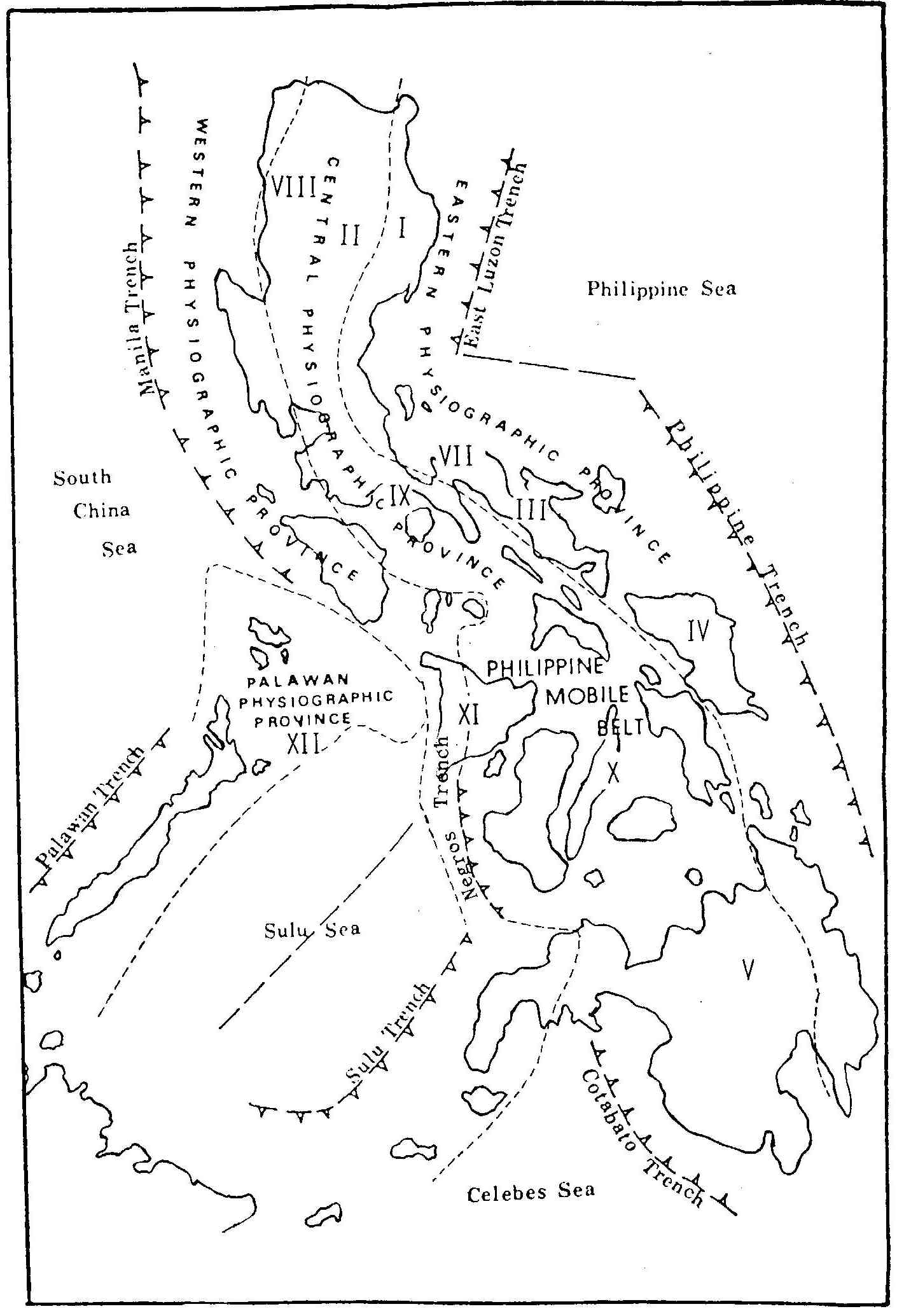
The Cotabato Trench in southern Mindanao and the Philippine Mobile Belt.

Near the Cotabato Trench, two of the largest 20th century Philippine earthquakes: the 1918 Celebes Sea earthquake (8.3 M_{w}) and the 1976 Moro Gulf earthquake (8.0 M_{w}). Also included is the 2002 Mindanao earthquake (7.5 M_{w}) and 2026 Mindanao earthquake (7.8 M_{w}). The Moro Gulf, part of the Celebes Sea, is labeled for context.

The initial earthquake was widespread and was felt as far as the central Philippine islands of the Visayas. A massive tsunami devastated 700 kilometers of coastline bordering the Moro Gulf in the North Celebes Sea, resulting in destruction and death in the coastal communities of the Sulu Archipelago, southern Mindanao particularly the provinces of Sultan Kudarat and Sarangani (formerly part of South Cotabato), and in the Zamboanga Peninsula including Zamboanga City and Pagadian City.

The maximum height of the waves reached 9 meters at Lebak on the isla; 4.3 meters at Alicia; 3 meters at Resa Bay on the eastern coast of Basilan; and at the islands of Jolo and Sacol. A field investigation revealed that the maximum height of the tsunami was approximately 15 m (49 ft). At least 5,000 people died during the earthquake and tsunami, with thousands more remaining missing. Some reports say that as many as 8,000 people lost their lives in total, with ninety percent of all deaths the result of the following tsunami.

Initially over 8,000 people were officially counted as killed or missing, 10,000 injured, and 90,000 homeless, making it one of the most devastating disasters in the history of the Philippine Islands. After the initial earthquake the people were unaware of the need to move to higher ground; when the tsunami hit it sucked most of the victims out to sea. Based on the investigation on the affected region it was confirmed that the waves reached up to 4 to 5 metres (13 to 16 ft) when they hit the areas. There were reports of weak tsunami activity as far as Japan.

In Zamboanga City, 14 buildings were partially damaged. The city was spared from serious damage of the tsunami triggered by this earthquake because the Basilan Island and the Santa Cruz Islands served as a buffer and deflected waves.

Intensity distribution by location
Intensity scales	Location
VII	Cotabato City; Jolo-Sulu; Zamboanga City
VI	Basilan City; Pagadian City; Dipolog City; Malaybalay-Bukidnon
V	Cagayan de Oro City; Davao City; General Santos
IV	Dumaguete; Hinatuan Surigao del Sur; Tagbilaran-Bohol; Cebu City; Surigao-Surigao del Norte
II	Roxas City; Iloilo City; Tacloban City; Legaspi City; Palo-Leyte; Catbalogan-Samar

== See also ==
- List of earthquakes in 1976
- List of earthquakes in the Philippines
