= Sangihe Trench =

Oceanic trench in the Pacific Ocean

Coordinates: 3°7′41.31″N 125°56′54.29″E

The Sangihe Trench is an oceanic trench in the Pacific Ocean, off the southwestern coast of Mindanao in the Philippines. It borders the central and southern Philippine Trench.

== History ==
The is Sangihe Trench is near the Sangihe Islands and is part of the tectonically complex Sulawesi-Philippine region. On June 8, 2026, a magnitude 7.8 earthquake was generated by tectonic activity in the area of the Sangihe Trench and the Cotabato Trench.
