= Moro Gulf =

Largest gulf in the Philippines

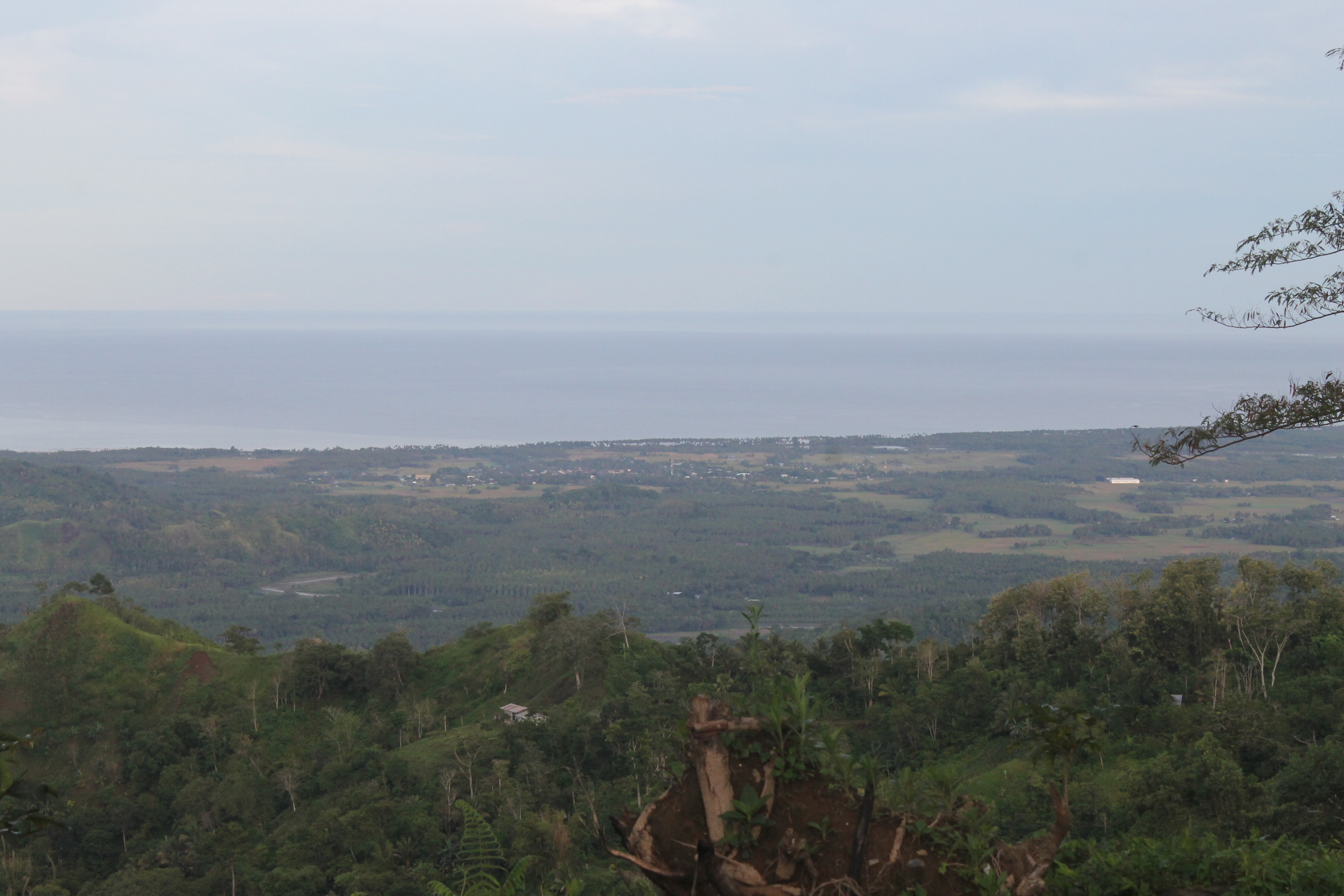
- The gulf seen from Lebak

- Location within the Philippines Moro Gulf (Philippines)
- Location: Mindanao Island
- Coordinates: 6°51′00″N 123°00′00″E
- Type: Gulf
- Etymology: Moro
- Part of: Celebes Sea
- Basin countries: Philippines
- Settlements: Alicia; Balabagan; Buug; Cotabato City; Datu Blah T. Sinsuat; Datu Odin Sinsuat; Dimataling; Dinas; Dumalinao; Hadji Mohammad Ajul; Ipil; Kabasalan; Kalamansig; Kapatagan; Kumalarang; Labangan; Lapuyan; Lebak; Mabuhay; Malabang; Malangas; Margosatubig; Matanog; Naga; Olutanga; Pagadian; Palimbang; Parang; Payao; Picong; Pitogo; Roseller Lim; San Pablo; Siay; Sultan Mastura; Sultan Naga Dimaporo; Tabina; Talusan; Tukuran; Tungawan; Vincenzo A. Sagun; Zamboanga City

The Moro Gulf is the largest gulf in the Philippines. It is located off the coast of Mindanao Island, and is part of the Celebes Sea. The gulf is one of the country's tuna fishing grounds.

== Geography ==
The gulf stretches between and is surrounded by the main section of Mindanao on the east, and the Zamboanga Peninsula of Mindanao on the west. The peninsula's major drainage goes towards the gulf.

Sibuguey Bay and Illana Bay are its major bays.

Zamboanga City, which is an international port, is bound by the Gulf and Celebes Sea in the East. Polloc, on Parang, Maguindanao del Norte, at the eastern coast, is another major port.

== Earthquakes ==
The Moro Gulf is also an area of significant tectonic activity with several fault zones in the region capable of producing major earthquakes and destructive local tsunamis. Such as the devastating 1976 Moro Gulf earthquake which killed over 5,000 people and left over 90,000 people homeless as it hit the west coast of Mindanao.

The two largest 20th century Philippine earthquakes: the 1918 Celebes Sea earthquake (8.3 M_{w}) and the 1976 Moro Gulf earthquake (8.0 M_{w}). The relatively large 2002 Mindanao earthquake (7.5 M_{w}) also occurred in the area. The Moro Gulf, part of the Celebes Sea, is labeled for context.

== See also ==
- Celebes Sea
- List of earthquakes in the Philippines
- Port of Zamboanga
