= Sacol =

Island in the Philippines

Sacol Island
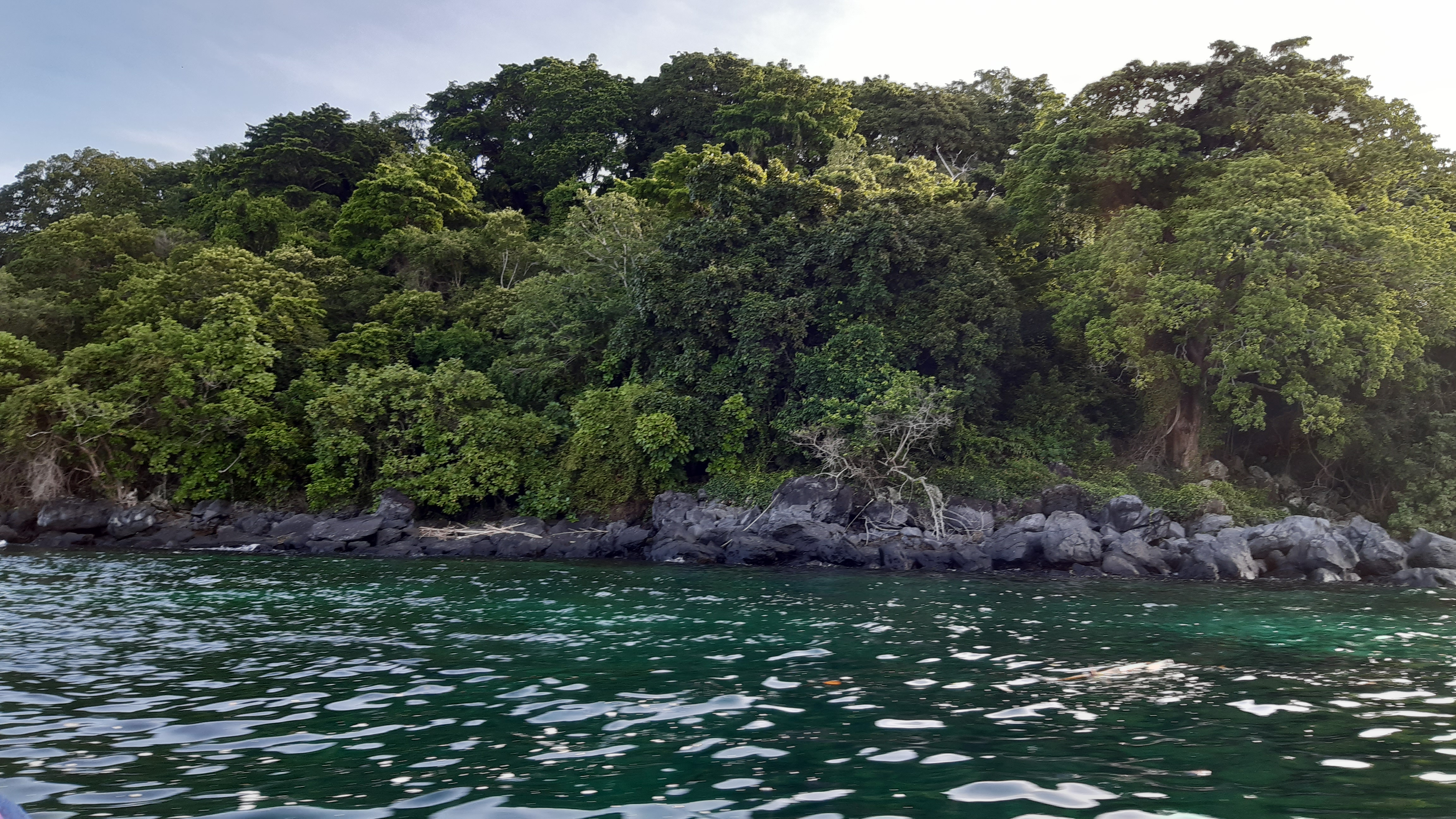
- Sacol Island in Zamboanga City

- Location within Philippines

Geography
- Coordinates: 6°57′35″N 122°14′2″E
- Adjacent to: Basilan Strait; Moro Gulf

Administration
- Philippines
- Region: Zamboanga Peninsula
- City: Zamboanga City

Additional information

Sacol is an island in Zamboanga City, Philippines. It is composed mainly of mangrove swamps and has the Sacol hill as its most prominent feature at 781 feet (238 m). In historic times, the island served as a refuge for merchants and sailors from nearby Basilan and Zamboanga that was caught under severe weather. Currently, it is a known scuba diving spot and a source of seafood.

Residents in the area are mostly Muslims. As of July 2023, the island is home to 14,000 people under four barangays, namely Busay, Landang Laum, Landang Gua, and Pasilmata.

== See also ==
- List of islands of the Philippines
