= 2026 Mindanao earthquake =

Magnitude 7.8 earthquake in the Philippines

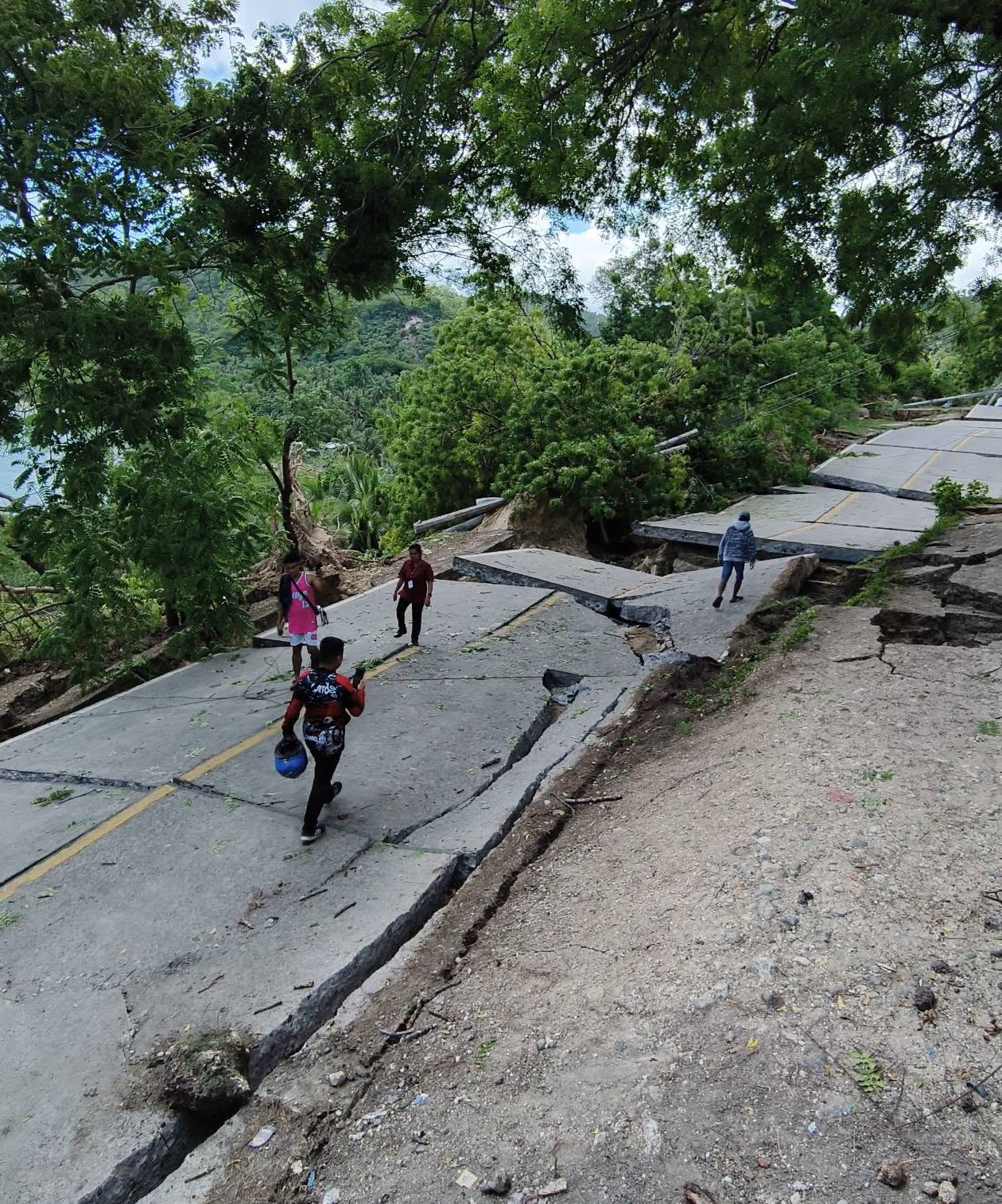
- A damaged section of highway in Glan, Sarangani

- UTC time: 2026-06-07 23:37:40
- ISC event: 645871578
- USGS-ANSS: ComCat
- Local date: June 8, 2026
- Local time: 07:37:40 PhST (UTC+08:00)
- Duration: 70 seconds
- Magnitude: M_{w} 7.8
- Depth: 57.0 km (35.4 mi) (USGS) 33 km (21 mi) (PHIVOLCS)
- Epicenter: 5.599°N 125.056°E
- Fault: Cotabato Trench
- Type: Thrust
- Areas affected: Mindanao, Philippines; North Sulawesi, Indonesia
- Total damage: ₱71 billion (US$1.44 billion)
- Max. intensity: MMI IX (PEIS VIII)
- Peak acceleration: 173.4 gal (0.177 g)
- Tsunami: 2.5 m (8.2 ft)
- Landslides: Yes
- Aftershocks: ≥8,500 (as of August 5, 2026); Two magnitude 6.5 events (strongest)
- Casualties: 107 dead, 1,320 injured, 7 missing

On June 8, 2026, at 07:37:40 PhST (23:37:40 UTC on June 7), a M_{w} 7.8 earthquake struck offshore southern Mindanao in the Philippines. The United States Geological Survey located the epicenter approximately 25 km (16 mi) southwest of Kablalan at a depth of about 57 km (35 mi), while the Philippine Institute of Volcanology and Seismology located it 32 km (20 mi) south of Maasim, Sarangani, at a depth of 33 km (21 mi). PHIVOLCS attributed the earthquake to subduction associated with the Cotabato Trench.

At least 106 people died, over 1,300 were injured and 7 were reported missing in Mindanao. The earthquake was among the most destructive in the country in five decades. The city of General Santos, and the provinces of Sarangani and South Cotabato in Soccsksargen and Davao Occidental in Davao, were the worst affected. Across Mindanao, over 138,500 homes were damaged or destroyed, along with numerous buildings and facilities; the towns of Sarangani, Jose Abad Santos, Glan and Malapatan had the highest percentage of homes affected, while more than 30% of homes were damaged in General Santos. The earthquake also caused severe damage, one death and several injuries on the Sangihe and Talaud Islands of North Sulawesi, Indonesia.

== Tectonic setting ==
The 2026 event is only among several major Philippine earthquakes that occurred within the same general area over the past century

Mindanao lies across the convergent boundary between the Sunda plate and the Philippine Sea plate. Part of the oblique convergence between these plates is taken up by subduction along the Cotabato Trench. The strike-slip component of the convergence is accommodated partly by the Philippine fault system and partly by the Cotabato fault system, a network of NW-SE trending sinistral (left-lateral) strike-slip faults that form the boundary between the Cotabato Arc and the Central Mindanao volcanic belt. In 1976, a magnitude 8.0 earthquake and tsunami along the same trench killed 8,000 people.

The Cotabato Trench lies off the southwestern coast of Mindanao where oceanic crust of the Sunda Plate beneath the Celebes Sea subducts beneath the Philippines Mobile Belt. It forms part of a linked set of trenches along the western side of the Philippines formed over east-dipping subduction zones, including the Manila Trench and the Negros Trench. At its northern end the rate of convergence across this boundary is about 100 mm (3.9 in) per year. It is a relatively young structure, forming during the late Miocene to Pliocene; this age is consistent with the estimated age of the sedimentary rocks in the accretionary wedge associated with the trench and the age of adakitic arc rocks on Mindanao thought to date the onset of subduction. Major earthquakes in 1918 and 1976 were associated with ruptures on its southern and northern sections, respectively. The latter event involved a 160 km (99 mi) long, northwest-striking, rupture of the subduction zone beneath the Moro Gulf.

== Earthquake ==
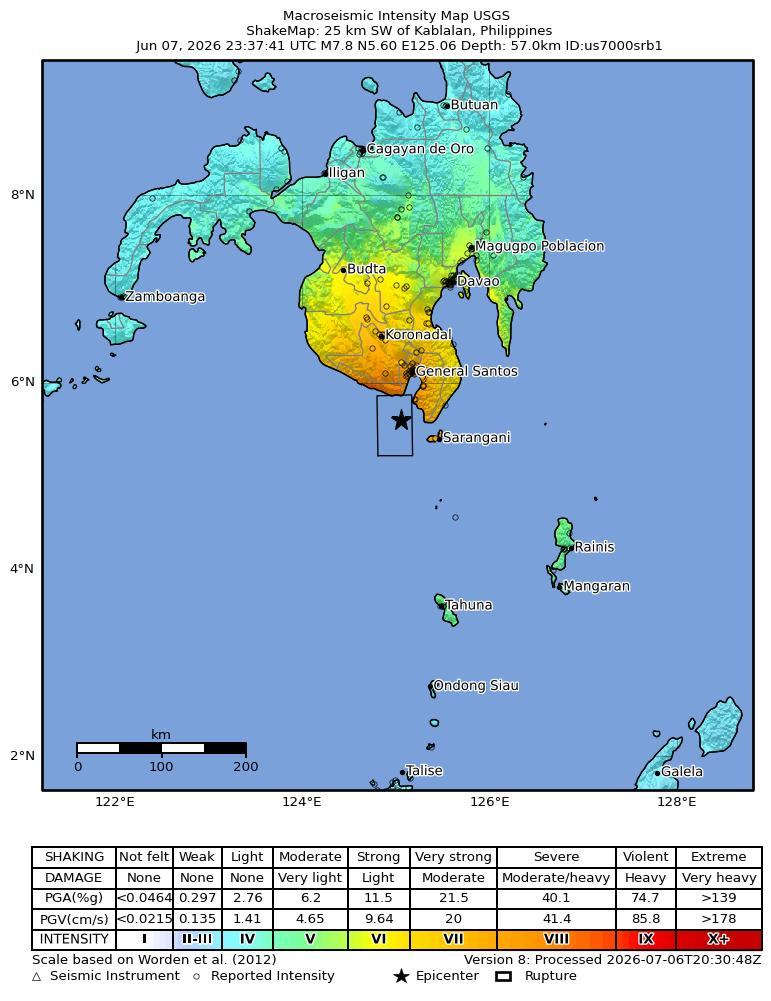
USGS ShakeMap showing the earthquake's intensity

The Philippine Institute of Volcanology and Seismology initially reported a magnitude of M_{w} 7.0, before revising the magnitude up to 7.8. The United States Geological Survey and European-Mediterranean Seismological Centre put the magnitude at M_{ww} 7.8 and recorded a depth of 57.0 km (35.4 mi) and 45 km (28 mi), respectively. The Meteorology, Climatology, and Geophysical Agency of Indonesia placed the moment magnitude at 7.7, along with a depth of 47 km (29 mi). Shaking was estimated to have lasted for around 30 seconds.

The earthquake was caused by thrust faulting on a north-south-striking, west-dipping fault or a north-northwest-striking, east-northeast-dipping fault. It occurred near the southern tip of Mindanao, close to where the northwest trending Cotabato Trench joins the north-south trending Sangihe Trench. The earthquake likely occurred because of a rupture along the northern Sangihe Trench or southern Cotabato Trench, or a combination of both scenarios. The entire rupture process was complete in about 70 seconds, releasing a seismic moment equivalent to 6.14×10^{20} N⋅m.

=== Intensity ===
A maximum Mercalli intensity of IX (Violent) was estimated by the USGS. According to the USGS Prompt Assessment of Global Earthquakes for Response service, approximately 10,000 people were within the zone of intensity IX in parts of Sarangani, including areas of Glan. An additional 1.405 million people were within the zone of intensity VIII (Severe), including the cities of General Santos, Polomolok, and other areas of Glan, while 2.91 million others were exposed to intensity VII (Very strong) shaking across Soccsksargen, Davao and Bangsamoro, as far away as the cities of Digos and Davao City. At least 5.93 million people were exposed to intensity VI (Strong) shaking across southern and central Mindanao, including Tagum and Cotabato City. On the PHIVOLCS earthquake intensity scale, a maximum intensity of VIII (Very destructive) was recorded at Malapatan, Sarangani. Tremors were felt as far as Abuyog and Dulag, Leyte at PEIS II (Slightly felt). In Indonesia, the earthquake was felt with an intensity of VI (Strong) at Miangas and Melonguane, V (Moderate) at Siau, Tagulandang and Sangihe Islands, IV (Light) in Morotai, Tolitoli and North Halmahera Regency and III (Weak) at Batang Dua Islands, Ternate, West Halmahera, Gorontalo, South Halmahera, East Halmahera, Parigi Moutong, Manado, Minahasa, Palu, Bitung, East Bolaang Mongondow, and Central Halmahera. Tremors were also felt in Tawau, Semporna and other parts of Sabah in Malaysia. A maximum peak ground acceleration of 173.4 gal (0.177 g) was recorded by a BMKG seismic station at Melonguane.

PEIS reported intensities
Intensity Scales	Location
VIII	Glan, Kiamba, Malapatan, and Malungon, Sarangani; General Santos
VII	Don Marcelino and Jose Abad Santos, Davao Occidental; Alabel, Maasim, and Maitum, Sarangani; Koronadal and Tupi, South Cotabato
VI	Lake Sebu, Polomolok, T'Boli, Tampakan, and Tantangan, South Cotabato; Lutayan and Palimbang, Sultan Kudarat
V	Sibuco and Siocon, Zamboanga del Norte; Buug, Zamboanga Sibugay; Mabini, Maco, and Pantukan, Davao de Oro; Bansalan, Digos, Hagonoy, Kiblawan, Magsaysay, Malalag, Matanao, Padada, Santa Cruz and Sulop, Davao del Sur; Davao City; Banaybanay, Boston, and Governor Generoso, Davao Oriental; Arakan, Carmen, Matalam, and President Roxas, Cotabato; Banga, Norala, Santo Niño and Surallah, South Cotabato; Bagumbayan, Esperanza, Kalamansig, Lambayong, Lebak, President Quirino and Tacurong, Sultan Kudarat; Upi, Maguindanao del Norte; Cotabato City
IV	Zamboanga City; Kibawe, Kitaotao, Quezon, and Valencia, Bukidnon; Tagum, Davao del Norte; Caraga, Cateel, Lupon, Manay, Mati, and Tarragona, Davao Oriental; Banisilan, Kidapawan, M'lang, and Magpet, Cotabato; Isulan, Sultan Kudarat; Isabela, Basilan
III	Baybay, Leyte; Dapitan, Zamboanga del Norte; Kumalarang and Vincenzo A. Sagun, Zamboanga del Sur; Baungon, Damulog, Dangcagan, Don Carlos, Impasugong, Kadingilan, Kalilangan, Lantapan, and Malaybalay, Bukidnon; Sultan Naga Dimaporo, Lanao del Norte; Iligan; Balingasag and Jasaan, Misamis Oriental; Cagayan de Oro; New Bataan, Davao de Oro; Baganga, Davao Oriental; Alamada, Cotabato; Columbio, Sultan Kudarat; Butuan; Mainit, Surigao del Norte; Madrid, Surigao del Sur; Bongao, Tawi-Tawi
II	Abuyog, Dulag, Javier, and Palo, Leyte; Hinundayan, Libagon, Saint Bernard, San Francisco, and San Juan, Southern Leyte; Dipolog, Labason, Liloy,President Manuel A. Roxas, and Salug, Zamboanga del Norte; Molave, Zamboanga del Sur; Alicia, Ipil, Mabuhay, Olutanga, and Siay, Zamboanga Sibugay; Libona, Bukidnon; Tubod, Lanao del Norte; Oroquieta and Plaridel, Misamis Occidental; Magsaysay, Misamis Oriental; Laak, Davao de Oro
I	Carcar, Cebu; Panaon, Misamis Occidental

Reported MMI intensities in Indonesia
Intensity Scales	Location
VI	Miangas and Melonguane, North Sulawesi
V	Siau, North Sulawesi; Tagulandang, Sangihe Islands Regency, North Sulawesi
IV	Morotai Regency, North Maluku; North Halmahera, North Maluku; Manado, North Sulawesi

=== Ground effects ===
Numerous landslides occurred in southern Mindanao. Of these, 70 caused damage, primarily in Glan and Jose Abad Santos. One landslide in Patulang, Jose Abad Santos measured 15 ha (37 acres), with some others in the town measuring 60 ha (150 acres). An unspecified barangay in southern Mindanao was also almost completely buried. The Philippine Space Agency (PhilSA) identified approximately 137.87 ha (340.68 acres) of land affected by landslides in Sarangani and Davao Occidental.

Along 100 km (62 mi) of coastline spanning the southern tip of Mindanao, primarily the towns of Glan in Sarangani and Jose Abad Santos in Davao Occidental, the earthquake raised the area's coastline by up to 2 m (6.6 ft) and moved it up to 200 m (660 ft) seawards, exposing coral reefs and other previously submerged areas, and affecting the local marine environment.

=== Tsunami ===
PHIVOLCS issued a tsunami warning for the provinces of Sarangani, Davao Occidental, Tawi-Tawi, Sulu, Basilan, Zamboanga del Sur, Zamboanga Sibugay, Sultan Kudarat, and South Cotabato, which prompted the evacuation of all residents and businesses living in the coastline of the identified provinces. Around 10,000 families in Sarangani and Sultan Kudarat were evacuated. BMKG also issued a tsunami warning and evacuation of residents in Gorontalo, Maluku Islands, Sulawesi, Borneo and Sangihe Islands. In Malaysia, tsunami advisories were issued by the Malaysian Meteorological Department for four beaches in Sabah, which include Tawau, Semporna, Kunak, and Lahad Datu. The Pacific Tsunami Warning Center said parts of the Philippine coastline could experience 3 m (9.8 ft) waves while 1 m (3 ft 3 in) waves could hit the Indonesian and Malaysian coast. A tsunami advisory was also issued for the Pacific coast of western and eastern Japan, ranging from Ibaraki Prefecture to Okinawa Prefecture. The Japan Meteorological Agency warned of waves reaching 1 m (3 ft 3 in) in Miyako Island and the Yaeyama Islands.

Two people drowned while a third went missing in the Philippines when they were swept out into the sea off General Santos; four others were rescued. A subsequent survey revealed a maximum run-up height of 2.5 m (8 ft 2 in) and 18 m (59 ft) run-in distance at Lebak, Sultan Kudarat. The tsunami also travelled 1 km (0.62 mi) upstream via a nearby rivermouth. At Salaman, eyewitness account stated that the tsunami arrived about 20 to 25 minutes after the earthquake, the highest run-up was 2.2 m (7 ft 3 in), and flowed 15.3 m (50 ft) inland. The tsunami damaged stilt homes and carried boats inland at Kalamansig; the survey recorded a 163 m (535 ft) inundation distance and 1.94 m (6 ft 4 in) wave height. On Balut Island, the tsunami carried large boulders and deposited them onto a reef flat. One boulder 1.2 by 0.7 by 2.5 m (3 ft 11 in by 2 ft 4 in by 8 ft 2 in) was displaced 30 m (98 ft) by the waves.

In Indonesia, tsunami waves were detected at Kedi in North Maluku province, Ulu Siau, and Melonguane, with the waves detected ranging from 0.09–0.19 m (3.5 in – 7.5 in), with the highest recorded measurement at Talengan-Sulut at 1.5 m (4 ft 11 in). PHIVOLCS reported tsunami waves along six areas in Mindanao's southern coast between 07:42 and 08:45 PHT measuring 1.4 m (4 ft 7 in). A 3 cm (1.2 in) tsunami was also recorded in two locations in Palau. In Japan, waves measuring 20 cm (7.9 in) were observed in the Ogasawara Islands and Kushimoto, Wakayama, while tsunami waves were also observed in Okinawa Prefecture.

Tsunami observations in the Philippines
Location	Tsunami height
Kiamba, Sarangani	1.48 m (4 ft 10 in)
Kalamansig, Sultan Kudarat	0.84 m (2 ft 9 in)
Maasim, Sarangani	0.48 m (1 ft 7 in)
Zamboanga City	0.25 m (9.8 in)
Mati, Davao Oriental	0.21 m (8.3 in)
Tandag, Surigao del Sur	0.09 m (3.5 in)

Tsunami observations in Indonesia
Location	Tsunami height
Talengen, North Sulawesi	0.75 m (2 ft 6 in)
Paleleh, Central Sulawesi	0.45 m (1 ft 6 in)
Melonguane and Tanjung Sidupa, North Sulawesi	0.32 m (1 ft 1 in)
Tahuna, North Sulawesi	0.30 m (1 ft 0 in)
Bitung, North Sulawesi	0.29 m (11 in)
Ulu Siau, North Sulawesi	0.18 m (7.1 in)
Ternate, North Maluku	0.14 m (5.5 in)
Loloda, North Maluku	0.09 m (3.5 in)

=== Aftershocks ===
PHIVOLCS recorded more than 8,500 aftershocks as of June 19, including three mb 6.0+ events, the largest measuring mb 6.5.

== Impact ==
=== Philippines ===
School children experiencing the earthquake in Malita, Davao Occidental

A video capturing the partial collapse of an abandoned school building at Matanao National High School, Davao del Sur

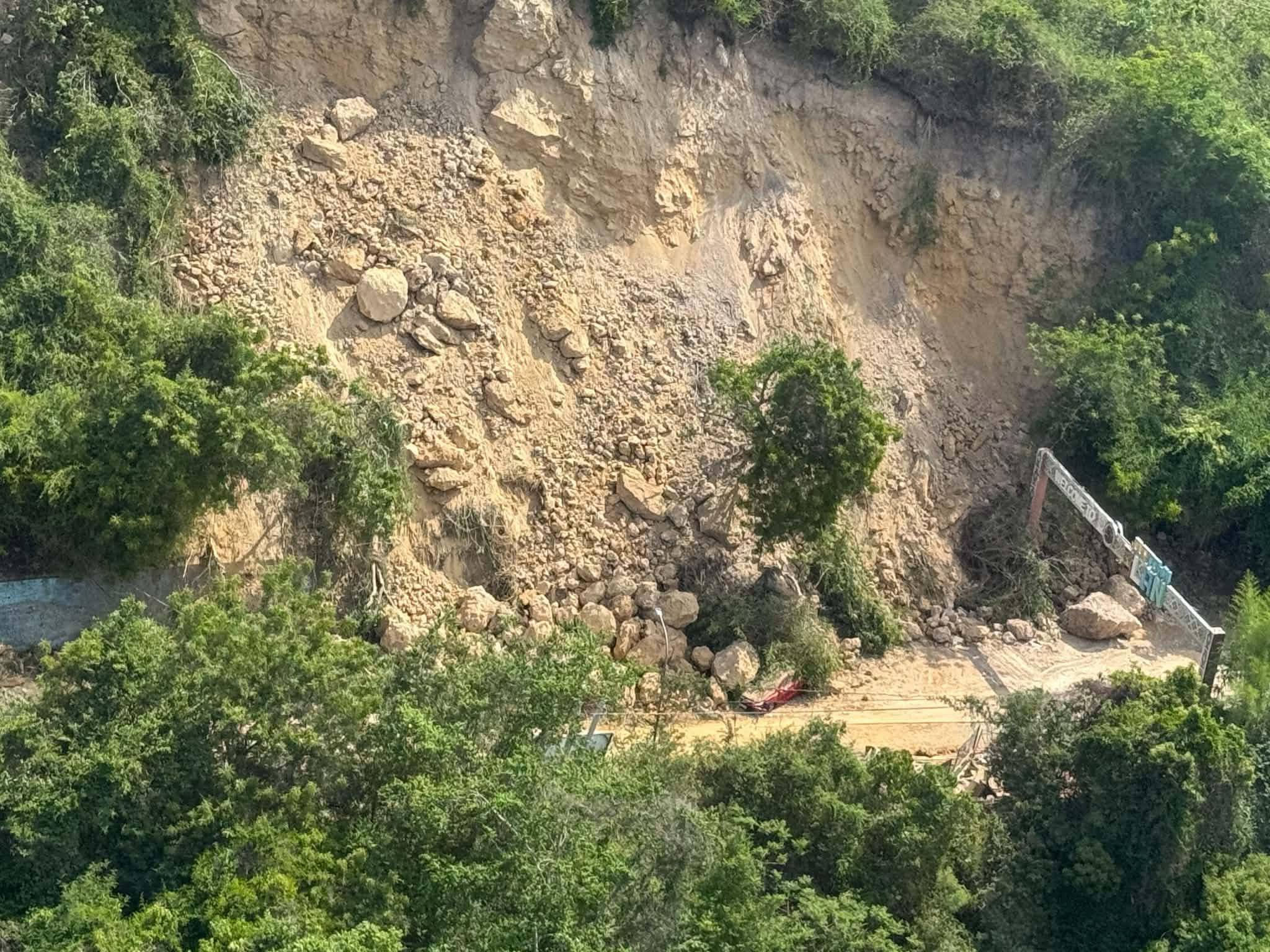
A landslide in Glan, Sarangani

At least 106 people died, 1,316 were injured and 7 remained missing as of July 21. By province, there were 47 deaths in Sarangani; 24 in South Cotabato, including 22 in General Santos and 2 in Tupi; 20 in Davao Occidental and 1 each in Davao del Sur and Bangsamoro. At least 32 deaths were reported in Glan, while 15 others were killed in Malapatan. Three people died after a wall at a warehouse of Century Pacific Food collapsed in General Santos. In Jose Abad Santos, 8 people were killed, including 7 due to landslides. A landslide dam created a lake in Barangay San Isidro. Two others were killed in Tupi, South Cotabato; one from a collapsing house and another due to cardiac arrest. Nine people were killed in Sarangani, Davao Occidental, seven of them from collapsing buildings, with five of the fatalities occurring in the barangay of Patuco. while one death occurred each in Malita, Digos in Davao del Sur and Basilan in Bangsamoro.

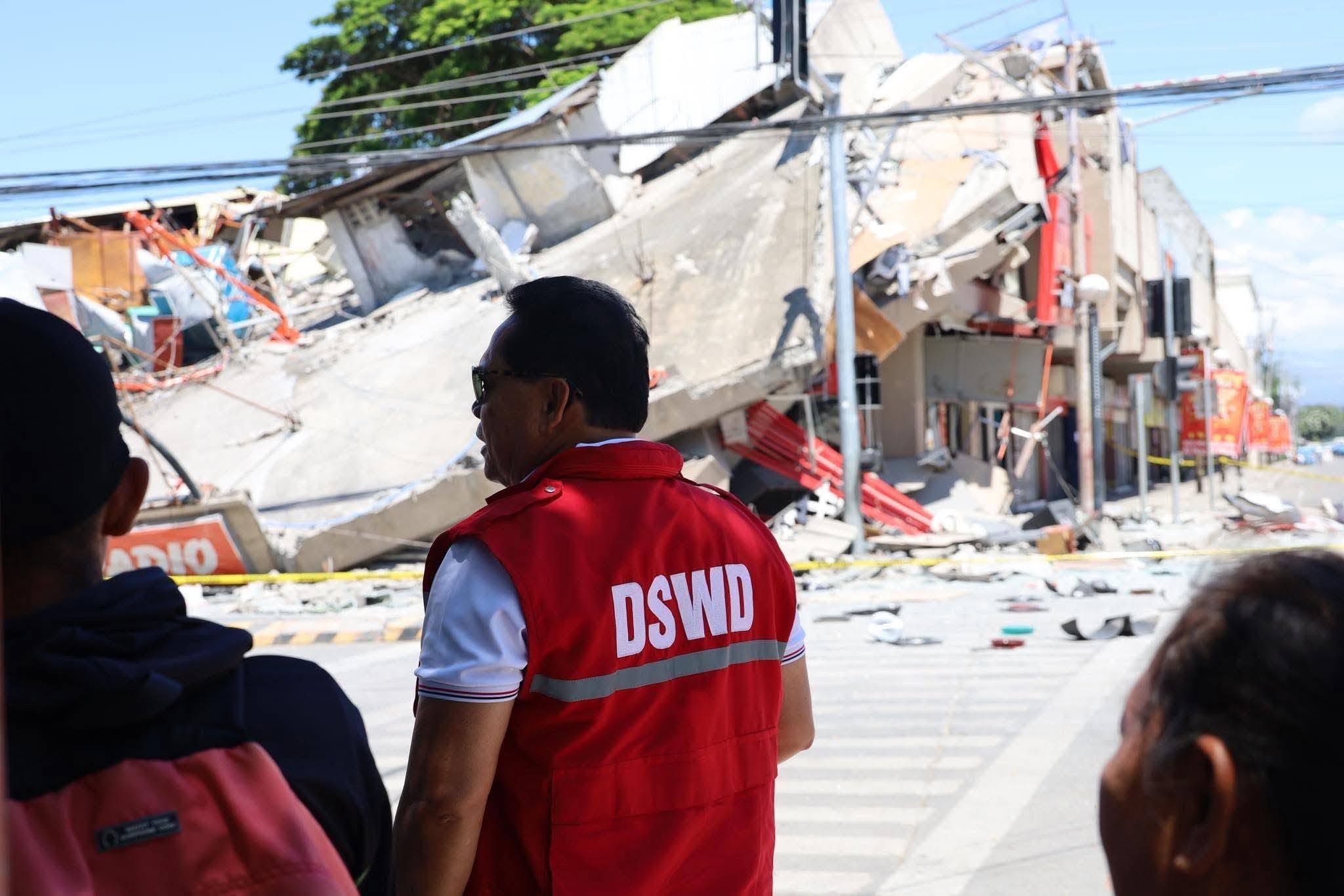
DSWD personnel inspecting a collapsed commercial building in General Santos

The NDRRMC confirmed that the regions of Zamboanga Peninsula, Davao, Soccsksargen, and Bangsamoro were affected by the earthquake. A total of 75,324 families, or 346,449 individuals, were affected, of which 16,349 people or 3,515 families were staying in evacuation centers, while 29,260 people or 7,279 families were sheltering in other locations. Thirty-seven landslides were recorded. Forty-five road sections and eight bridges were affected. At least 138,563 homes were damaged across Mindanao, of which 19,243 were destroyed. The Soccsksargen Police Regional Office also recorded damage to 20 structures across the region: 14 commercial establishments, two hospitals, and two residential houses. Twenty-six areas experienced power disruptions, and one area was affected by a landslide.

The Department of Education estimated that more than 3.2 million students, 128,000 staff, and 6,224 public schools in 33 school divisions across Zamboanga Peninsula, Northern Mindanao, Davao Region, Soccsksargen, and Caraga Region were affected by the quake, which struck on the first day of classes in the new school year. at least 1,022 schools were damaged, while 8,208 classes were suspended across the affected regions since June 8. Students at the Cotabato City Central Pilot Elementary School, who were gathered for the flag ceremony assembly, evacuated from the school buildings after the ground shook. A dilapidated building in Matanao National High School collapsed. Davao del Sur Schools Division Superintendent Lorenzo Mendoza said that the structure was no longer occupied following the 2019 Cotabato and Davao del Sur earthquakes. The school confirmed no students were harmed. Some students of the Santa Cruz National High School in Davao del Sur were assisted by local emergency responders due to sustaining minor injuries and losing consciousness. Incident reports show that a total of 1,023 classrooms received minor damages, 296 classrooms were severely damaged, and 199 classrooms were destroyed by the earthquake and aftershocks. DepEd estimated that ₱7.79 million (US$158,111.68) will be required for the clean-up and clearing operations in 267 affected public schools, as well as ₱43.9 million (US$891,451.78) for the repair of all damaged classrooms.

The National Grid Corporation of the Philippines reported damage on transmission lines that served Davao del Sur, Davao Occidental, Davao de Oro, Davao Oriental, Maguindanao del Norte, Maguindanao del Sur, Sarangani, South Cotabato, North Cotabato, and Sultan Kudarat. Services were restored in some areas by 08:20 (PHT). Several power distributors experienced power disruptions, which affected more than 800,000 households. Power-generating units in the affected areas were placed on emergency shutdowns. The San Miguel Corporation's Malita coal plant's two generating units, with a combined capacity of 300 megawatts, were affected by the quake and were put offline. Two units of Sarangani Energy Corporation's coal plant, totalling 237 megawatts, remain under emergency shutdown while the remaining diesel power plants in the province continue to operate. Power Source Philippines Inc., the microgrid system provider serving Balut Island, was also affected, disrupting electricity service to 949 households across eight barangays.

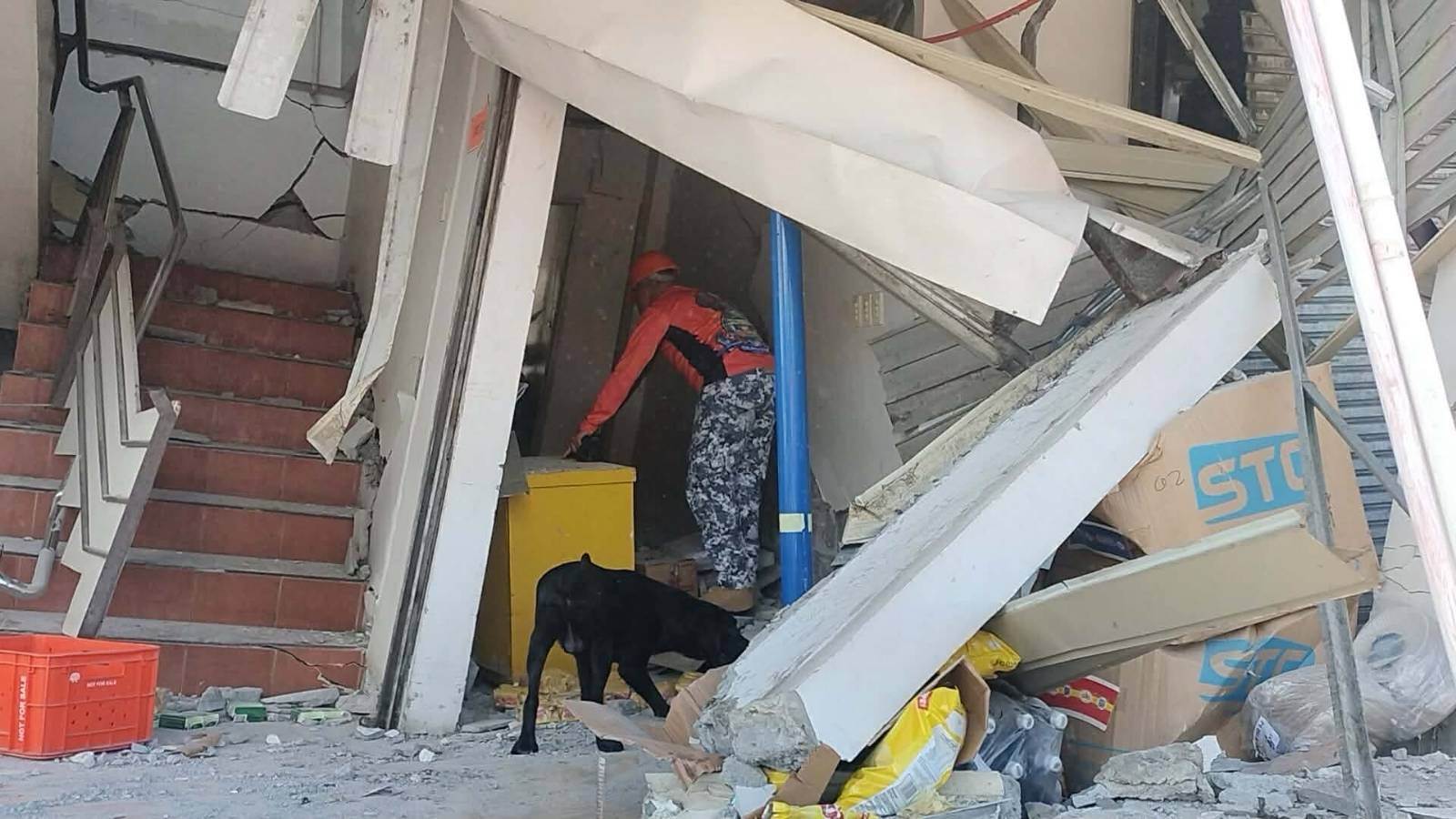
Search and rescue operations at a collapsed commercial building in General Santos

Property damage was valued at ₱1 billion (US$20.3 million) in General Santos alone. In the city, 506 people were injured, 4,188 houses collapsed and 50,722 others sustained partial damage, or about 31% of households in the city. Multiple convenience stores and buildings also collapsed, including a building with a Jollibee restaurant and a Love Radio studio, a building of the Notre Dame of Dadiangas University and a shopping mall. The General Santos City Hall partially collapsed. Several cars were crushed by falling debris outside Plaza Nova. Parts of SM City General Santos sustained minor damage prompting its management to suspend operations. Multiple people were trapped after a building collapsed in the city. The Office of Civil Defense said there were reports of students being trapped in a two-story school.

Across Sarangani province, 47 people were reported killed, 3 were missing, 262 were injured, 8,466 homes were destroyed and 31,824 others were damaged. Glan was considered one of the worst hit areas, as it sustained major damage to infrastructure like roads and bridges, making it unreachable by vehicles and forcing residents to navigate the damaged route on foot, according to OCD Soccsksargen Director Rodrigo Sosmeña. In the town, 5,399 homes collapsed and 16,556 were damaged, or about 81% of the municipality's housing stock. In Malapatan, 74% of homes were damaged or destroyed; 2,558 (14%) collapsed and 11,226 (60%) were damaged. At least 336 homes and a shrine collapsed, 15% of homes were damaged, and a bridge was damaged in Maasim while several people at a ceremony fainted due to panic caused by the shaking. A police building and many other buildings in Alabel were also damaged. The barangay hall of Alegria in Alabel gained significant damage, with the local DRRMO reporting that the building was no longer safe to use. In Ladol Beach Resort in Alabel, three cottages collapsed with reported ground deformation. The Superintendent of Sarangani Bay Protected Seascape said that damages to marine resources caused by coastal uplift had cost at least ₱70 billion (US$1.42 billion). In South Cotabato province, 395 people were injured, 1,200 homes collapsed and 8,685 others were damaged, most of them in Polomolok, Tupi, Lake Sebu and T'Boli. Houses also collapsed in Banga, Tampakan, Koronadal and Tantangan. Damage in the province totalled about ₱590 million. A landslide occurred in Mount Melibengoy. Several roads were cracked in Tantangan and a bridge collapsed in Banga. A stretch of the highway from T'Boli to General Santos was closed after it collapsed. Essential utilities such as Internet, electricity, and water services were disrupted in Koronadal and in nearby areas. In Polomolok, 421 homes collapsed and 3,360 were damaged. At least 51 homes collapsed and 158 more were damaged in Lutayan, Sultan Kudarat.

In Davao Occidental, 5,380 homes collapsed and 27,298 others were damaged, or 67% of the province's housing stock. At least 130 homes collapsed and 1,658 others were damaged in Malita (6.1%), 2,433 homes collapsed and 4,668 others were damaged in Sarangani (100%), 2,765 homes were destroyed and 19,928 were damaged in Jose Abad Santos (100%), 42 homes collapsed and 658 others were damaged in Don Marcelino (6.2%), and 10 homes collapsed and 386 others were damaged in Santa Maria (2.7%). Four homes also collapsed and another was damaged in Digos, while two homes were destroyed and 95 others were damaged in Tagum, 201 homes were damaged in New Corella, eight homes collapsed and 14 others were damaged in Kapalong, and 29 homes were damaged in Carmen, Island Garden City of Samal, Santo Tomas, and Braulio E. Dujali. Several residents of Balut Island, including those who were injured, senior citizens, and a mother with her infant child, were airlifted to Davao City for medical treatment. The Mabila Port sustained severe damage after its causeway and apron were partially severed. A high-rise condominium building in Davao City was damaged, with video showing the 36-story structure swaying during the earthquake. A concrete footbridge in the city also collapsed. Nine people were evacuated. An expansion joint and railings on the Bucana Bridge were damaged. Across Davao City, a total seven buildings were severely damaged and 22 others were partially damaged. Six shanties on stilts collapsed in Pagadian, Zamboanga del Sur. In Maguindanao del Sur, 46 homes were damaged, of which six collapsed in the towns of Paglat, Pandag, Mangudadatu, Datu Salibo, Datu Hoffer Ampatuan, Datu Paglas, Datu Piang, General Salipada K. Pendatun and Buluan. Minor damage was reported to three classrooms and three rooms of a high school in Amai Manabilang, Lanao del Sur. One home was damaged in Isabela, Basilan.

=== Indonesia ===
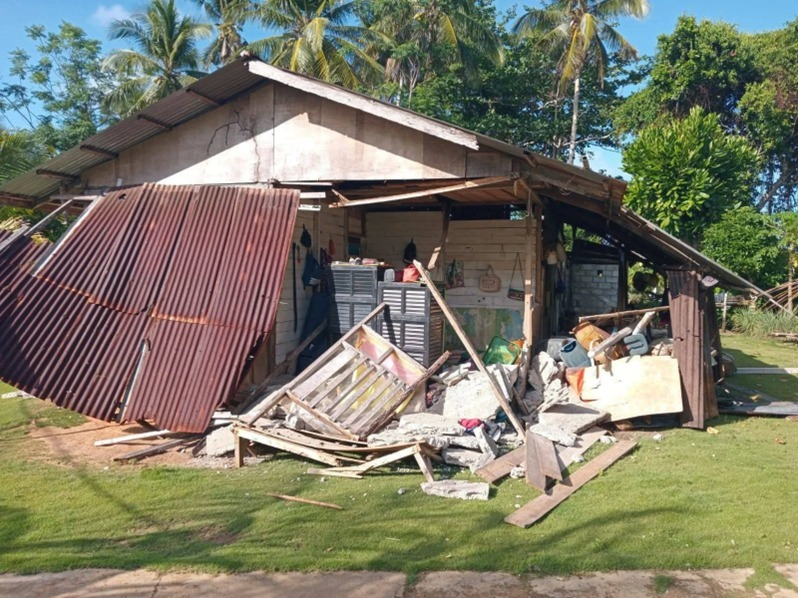
A house destroyed in Sangihe Island, North Sulawesi

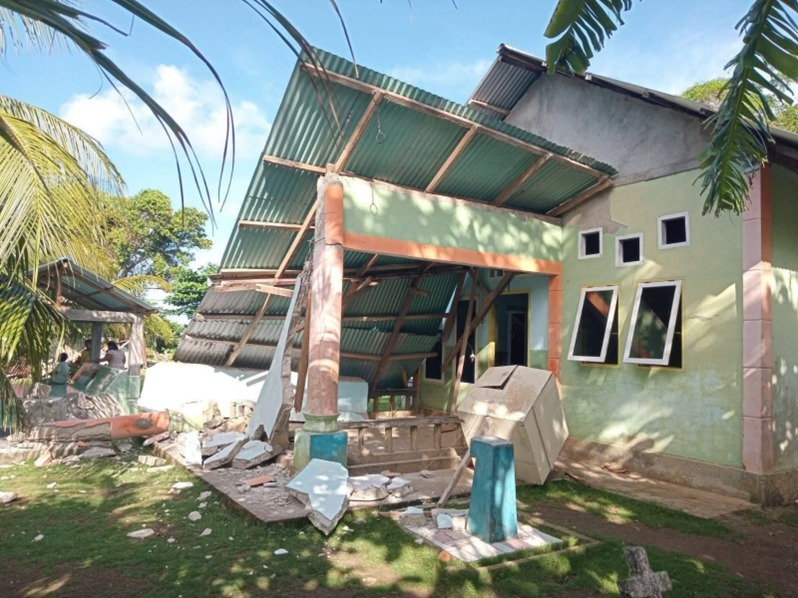
Collapsed roof of a house in Sangihe Island, North Sulawesi

In North Sulawesi, 1 person died and 4 were injured. At least 100 homes and buildings were damaged, including two churches that suffered structural damage, and 1,160 people were displaced in the Sangihe and Talaud Islands regencies. Five buildings, including one building belonging to GMIM 76 and an educational facility, were also affected in North Minahasa Regency. Eleven houses and places of worship were damaged in Talaud Islands Regency, and a hospital and a port warehouse were damaged in Melonguane.

== Response ==
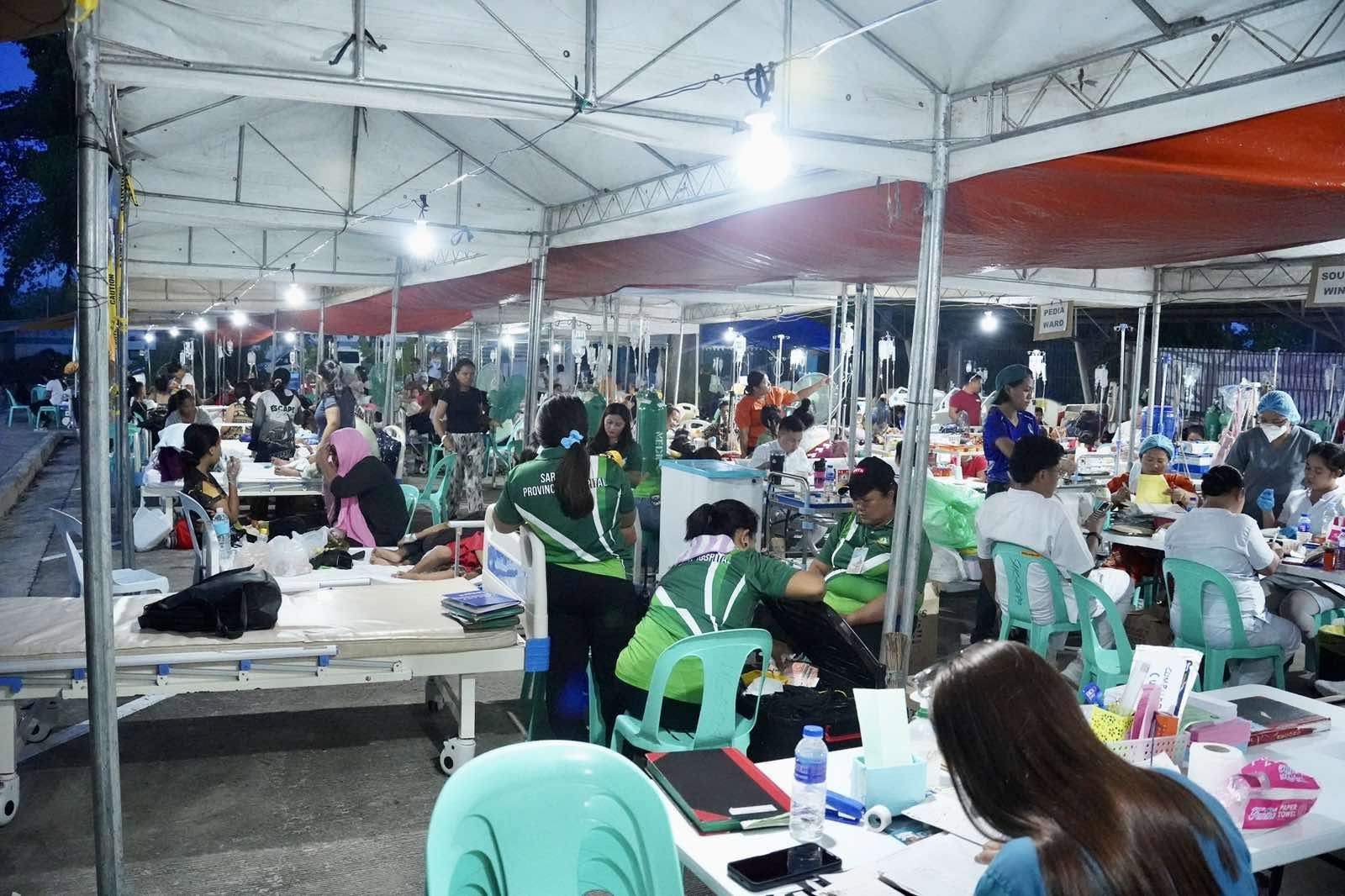
Evacuated patients at Sarangani Provincial Hospital

=== Local ===
A state of calamity was declared in the city of General Santos and throughout the provinces of Davao Occidental, Sarangani and South Cotabato due to the earthquake. General Santos Mayor Lorelie Pacquiao directed all city government personnel to be involved in frontline and vital services to report to duty while suspending all classes at all levels and work in government and private offices until further notice. Sarangani Governor Rogelio Pacquiao imposed province-wide emergency measures including emergency evacuation and safety protocols, rapid damage assessment and needs analysis (RDANA), unified disaster response and social services protocols, and emergency class suspensions and work adjustments for a period of 72 hours following the main shock. These emergency protocols were extended until June 17 in view of the provincial declaration of a state of calamity.

Classes at all levels, in both public and private schools, as well as work in government offices, were also suspended throughout South Cotabato, Cotabato, Sultan Kudarat, Maguindanao del Norte, Maguindanao del Sur, Basilan, Tawi-Tawi, Cotabato City, Kidapawan, Davao City, Davao del Norte, Davao Oriental, Davao de Oro, Agusan del Sur, Damulog, Kibawe, Valencia, Cagayan de Oro, and Davao Occidental while a work suspension was imposed in Davao del Sur and Bangsamoro.

Operations were temporarily suspended at General Santos International Airport by the Civil Aviation Authority of the Philippines to conduct safety assessment after the earthquake which affected 17 flights: 11 operated by Cebu Pacific, four operated by PAL Express, and two operated by Philippine Airlines. The airport was then reopened to facilitate landing and takeoff operations for government, military, and humanitarian flights. Ceiling tiles fell and glass windows shattered. The Department of Transportation confirmed the normal operations of other airports in Mindanao. The southbound lane of Bolton Bridge in Davao City was closed pending inspection of Department of Public Works and Highways and City Engineer's Office personnel. Numerous areas were assessed after the earthquake, including the Davao del Sur Provincial Hospital, General Santos, and Kapatagan, Lanao del Norte.

The Municipal Government of Bansalan, Davao del Sur, enabled their Emergency Operations Center to handle the local relief operations. Cagayan de Oro Mayor Ronaldo Uy directed the City Disaster Risk Reduction and Management Office to prioritize safety inspections of schools and high-rise structures. Cebu Governor Pam Baricuatro and Cebu City Mayor Nestor Archival instructed their respective disaster response teams to coordinate to with their counterparts in the affected region in assessing and determining the appropriate aid to provide. The Cebu Provincial Board approved ₱10 million (US$203,045.69) in aid to General Santos. The Provincial Government of Pangasinan expressed its commitment to extend aid to the affected local government units due to their sufficient calamity funds. Bangsamoro Chief Minister Abdulraof Macacua ordered the deployment of the Rapid Emergency Action on Disaster Incidence Team in coordination with the OCD Bangsamoro Autonomous Region to assist with damage assessment, coordination, and information management efforts in affected communities.

=== National ===
President Bongbong Marcos visiting affected areas in General Santos

President Bongbong Marcos issued a statement directing all government agencies to respond to the disaster, with the OCD and NDRRMC conducting disaster response and monitoring on all affected areas, Department of Social Welfare and Development pre-positioning relief goods and preparing evacuation centers, and Department of Public Works and Highways assessing damage to roads, bridges, and critical infrastructure. He also ordered the suspension of all work and classes throughout all affected regions. 2,784 search, rescue, and retrieval personnel have been deployed across affected areas, with an additional 1,475 responders on standby for immediate deployment. The response force includes 23 teams from the Armed Forces of the Philippines, 310 teams from the PNP, 169 teams from the Philippine Coast Guard, and 510 teams from the Bureau of Fire Protection.

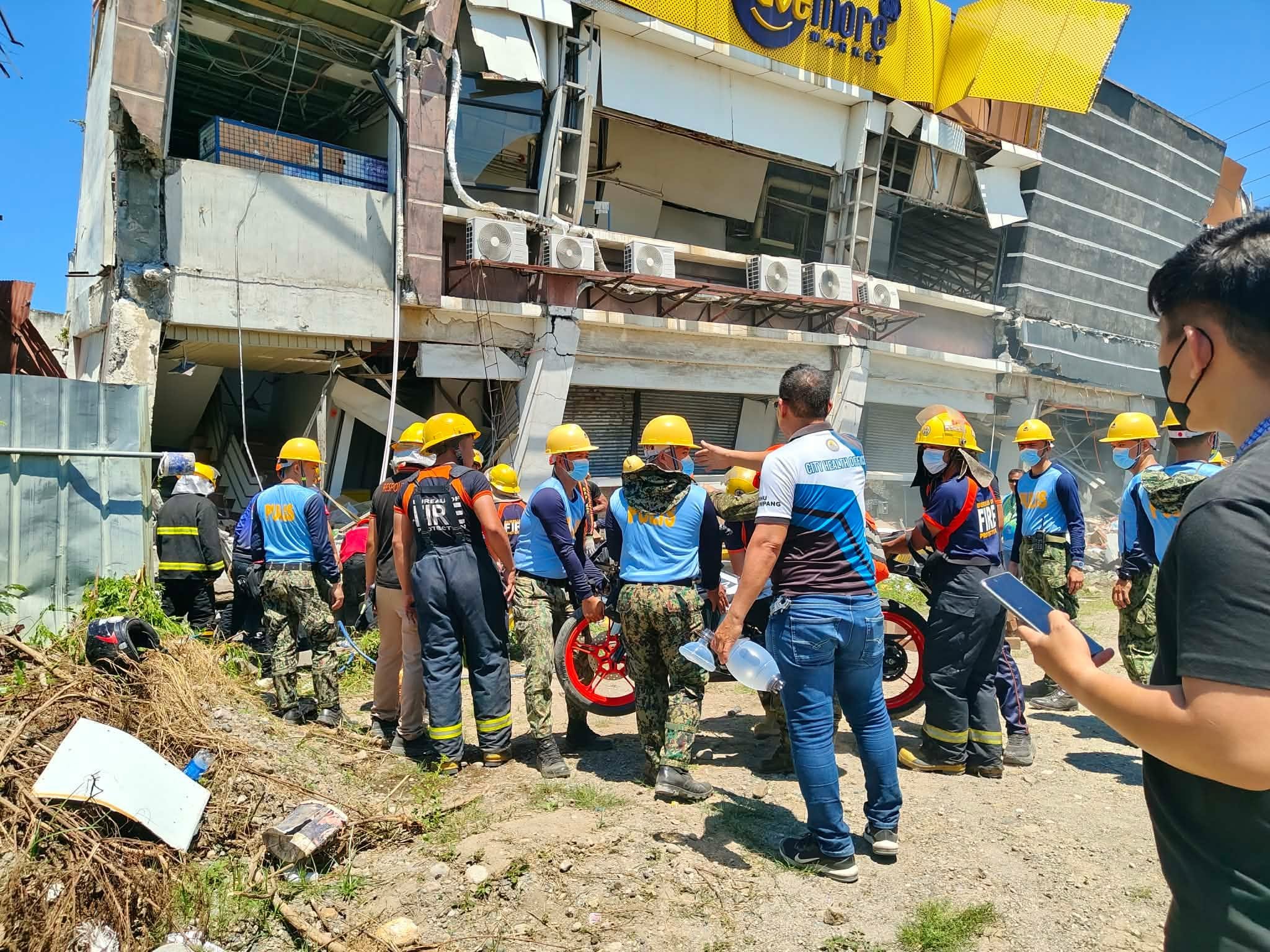
Search and rescue operations in General Santos

Department of Education Secretary Sonny Angara deployed DepEd engineers to provinces affected by the earthquake. Department of Health Undersecretary and Spokesperson Albert Domingo said that all crisis protocols have been implemented in hospitals throughout Mindanao while doing rapid assessments of health concerns in Mindanao regions. DPWH Secretary Vince Dizon stated that his agency will prioritize the repair of bridges, roads, hospitals, and schools to ensure smooth transportation of goods and rescue personnel to affected areas as well as the evacuation of victims. The Department of Budget and Management says that there are available Quick Resource Funds in the 2026 national budget for immediate deployment by the concerned agencies and they are ready to process any request for QRF replenishment. A price freeze of basic commodities was imposed on General Santos by the Department of Trade and Industry following the local government's declaration of a state of calamity. The Department of Energy assessed the effect of the earthquake on power networks and encouraged the public to report any fuel price hike violations in the affected areas.

On June 10, President Marcos visited General Santos to personally assess the damage to a hospital and two schools in the city, and to oversee the distribution of financial assistance to identified individuals. He pledged ₱50,000 (US$1,015.23) each to families whose members died in the earthquake. Vice President Sara Duterte attended the wake of several victims in Malapatan, Sarangani. The Office of the Vice President deployed its Kalusugan Food Truck to provide hot meals to frontliners working in the disaster areas. The PCG suspended all watercraft operations in the coastal areas of Sarangani and Davao Occidental. The National Historical Commission of the Philippines reiterated reminders for heritage site caretakers in the affected areas, such as area security, safety of heritage site personnel, photographic documentation of damage, and recovery of objects. The Bureau of Internal Revenue extended tax deadlines for taxpayers registered in the provinces of South Cotabato and Sarangani as well as General Santos, moving its tax filing, payment, and document submission deadlines falling between June 8 and 29 to June 30, 2026. Courts in three judicial regions were suspended by the Supreme Court of the Philippines in Zamboanga City, Sarangani, Digos, Samal, Tagum, Davao Oriental, Davao de Oro, Mati, Davao del Sur, South Cotabato, Davao City, Davao del Sur, Tacurong and Sultan Kudarat. The National Electrification Administration reactivated Task Force Kapatid and deployed linemen from other electric distribution cooperatives to help restore electricity to some 803,230 consumer connections affected. According to the NEA Disaster Risk Reduction and Management Department, three cooperatives in Soccskargen experienced total power interruption, while one cooperative in Davao Region had partial outages.

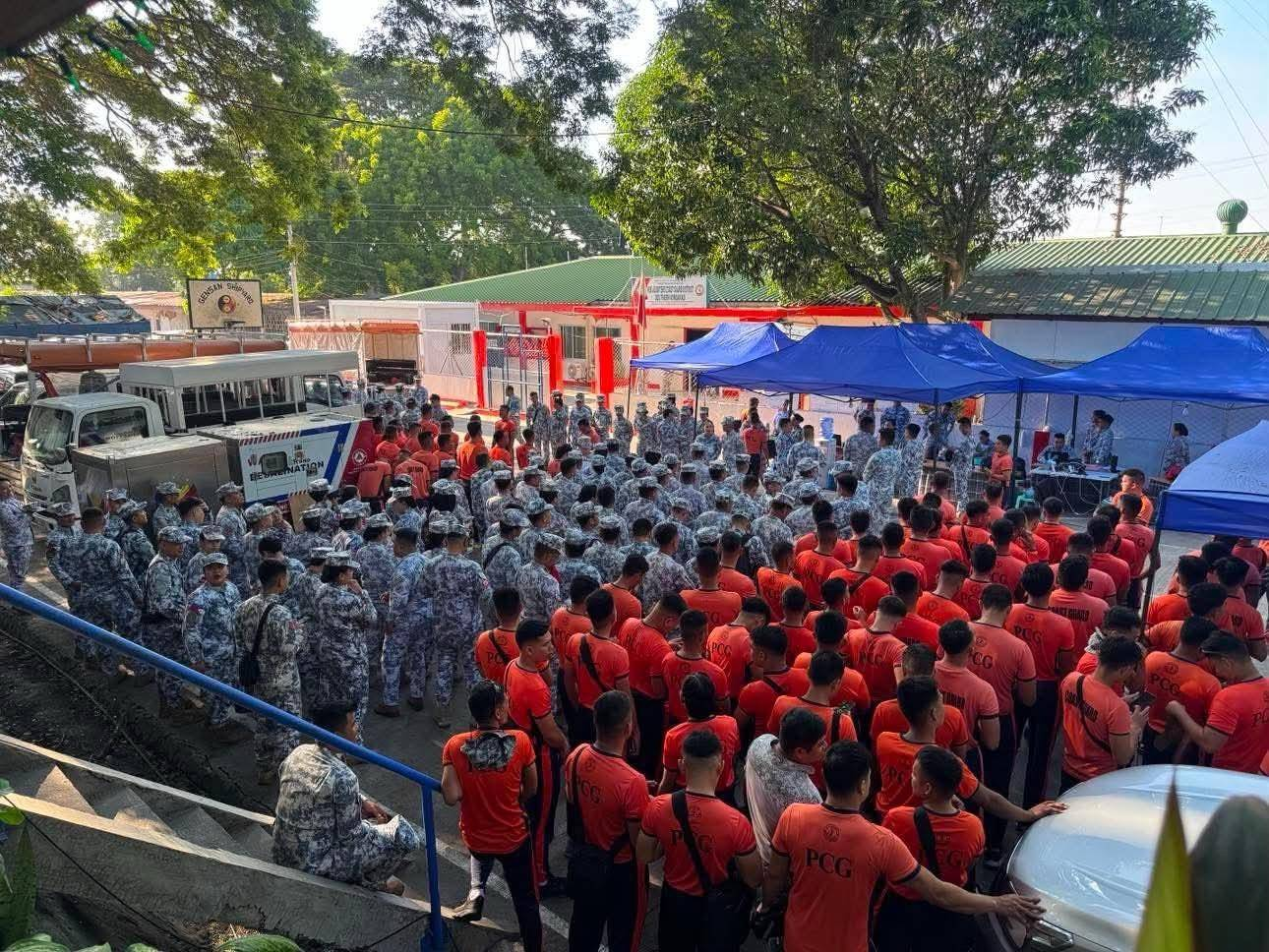
A team of 150 responders deployed by the Philippine Coast Guard

Distribution of aid in General Santos

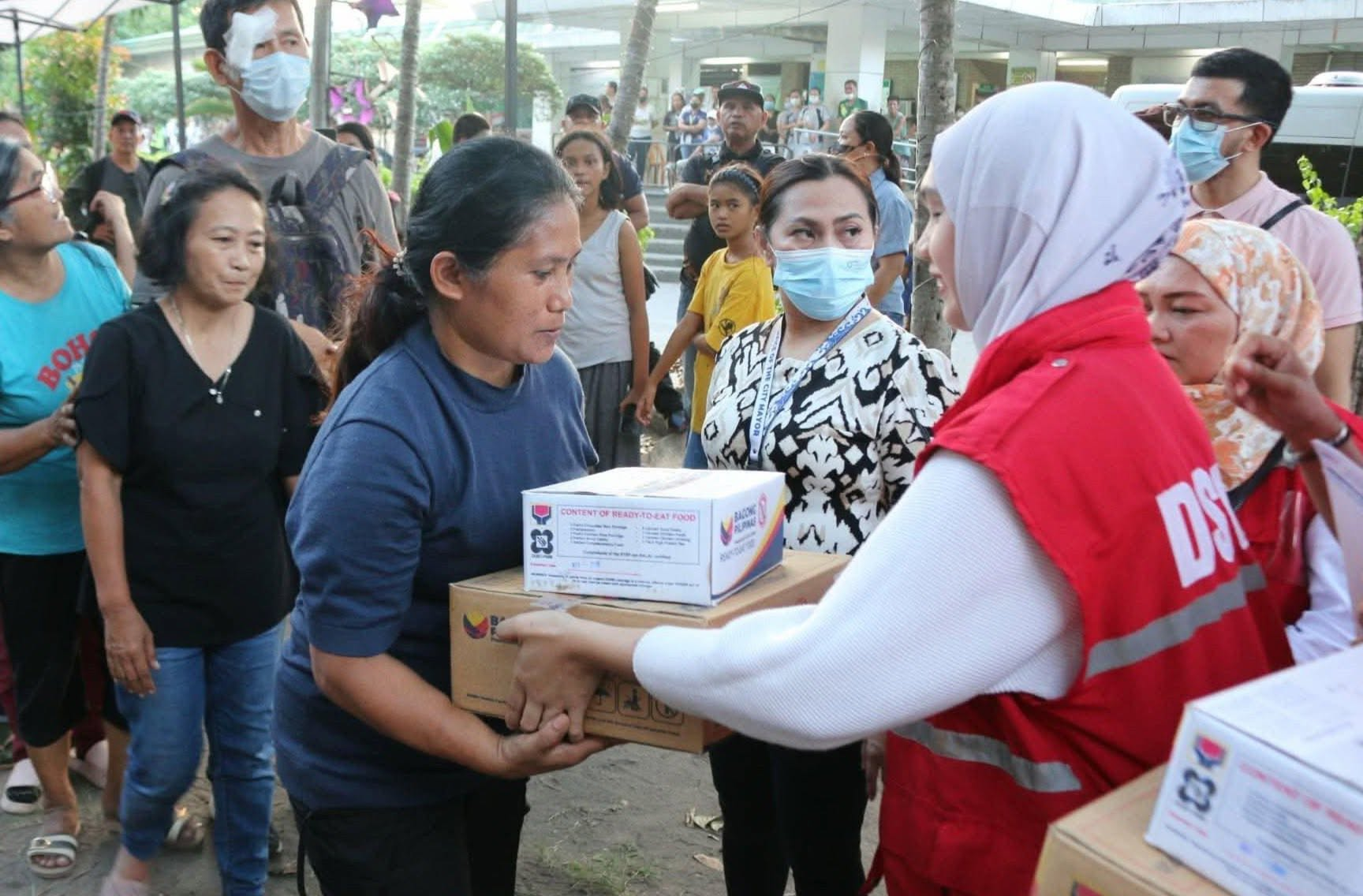
DSWD personnel providing relief goods to evacuees

Soccsksargen police deployed 500 personnel and 23 vehicles across the region to assist in response operations, with 390 assigned to search, rescue, and retrieval operations, 100 securing vital installations, and 10 assigned to the Women and Children Protection Center. Soccsksargen DSWD Field Office convened its Disaster Response Management Division and Quick Response Team to coordinate with affected local government units while setting up mobile command centers and field kitchens to assist in the evacuation of affected residents. The Philippine Army's 10th Infantry Division mobilized its Humanitarian Assistance and Disaster Response teams from the 27th and 28th Infantry Battalions, Task Force Gensan, the 1002nd Infantry Brigade, and the 10th Emergency Response Company. to assist affected communities. The Philippine Air Force deployed rotary and fixed-wing aircraft from Tactical Operations Group 11 in Davao City to assist in rapid damage assessment and needs analysis activities in General Santos and Sarangani, humanitarian and disaster response operations, and air transport of government officials and personnel from other government agencies and other service branches of the AFP.

The Alliance of Concerned Teachers posted their concern over damaged schools due to the earthquake. Robinsons and SM Malls in General Santos were closed to allow their engineering and construction teams conduct inspections on the buildings. The Philippine Red Cross was put on the highest alert and members were deployed to assess structural damage and coordinate evacuation and relief operations. PLDT and Smart Communications dispatched field and operations teams to evaluate network facilities and restore connectivity services in regions. Jollibee stated that all its General Santos-based team members have been accounted for and no injuries were reported in their stores located in the affected areas. Catholic Bishops' Conference of the Philippines President Archbishop Gilbert Garcera asked all bishops in the country to authorize a second collection for the earthquake victims and to offer General Intercessions for the victims of the earthquake and those tasked with relief and rescue efforts.

=== International ===
Structural damages were monitored and reassessed by the Fire and Rescue Department of Malaysia and the state government of Sabah through their Disaster Management Committee. Prime Minister Anwar Ibrahim also announcing they were ready to extend any assistance needed by the Philippines.

UNICEF Philippines said it is ready to support the government's emergency response, adding that emergency supplies and multipurpose cash were prepositioned to help provide access to support essential services.

== See also ==
- 1913 Sulawesi–Mindanao earthquake
- November 2023 Mindanao earthquake
- List of earthquakes in 2026
- List of earthquakes in the Philippines
