= Legaspi (surname) =

Legaspi is a surname, a variant of Spanish Legazpí. Notable people with the surname include:

- Celeste Legaspi (born 1950), Filipina singer and actress
- Cesar Legaspi (1917–1994), Filipino national artist
- Ireneo Legaspi (died 2006), Filipino professional golfer
- Julián Legaspi (born 1973), Uruguayan-Peruvian actor
- Leonardo Legaspi (born 1935), Filipino archbishop
- Lito Legaspi (1941–2019), Filipino actor
- Kier Legaspi (born 1973), Filipino actor
- Zoren Legaspi (born 1972), Filipino actor and television director
- Randy Gerard Legaspi Santiago (born 1960), Filipino actor, singer, producer

Fictional characters:

- Kim Legaspi, psychiatrist in TV medical drama series ER

== See also ==
- Miguel López de Legazpi (1502–1572), A Spanish conquistador who founded the Spanish colony in the Philippines
- Legazpi (disambiguation)
