= 2002 Mindanao earthquake =

Magnitude 7.5 earthquake in the southern Philippines

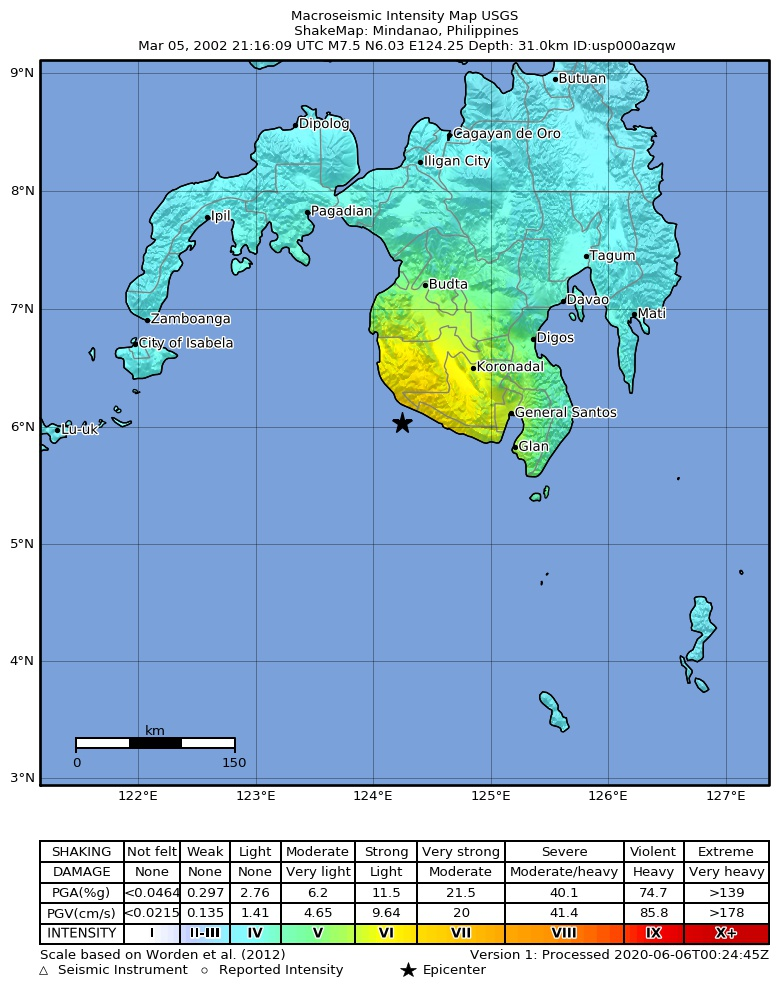
- USGS ShakeMap

- Location within Mindanao
- UTC time: 2002-03-05 21:16:09
- ISC event: 2904823
- USGS-ANSS: ComCat
- Local date: March 6, 2002
- Local time: 05:16:09 PST (UTC+8:00)
- Magnitude: M_{w} 7.5
- Depth: 31 km (19 mi)
- Epicenter: 6.033°N 124.249°E
- Fault: Cotabato Trench
- Type: Oblique-reverse
- Areas affected: Mindanao, Philippines
- Max. intensity: PEIS IX (MMI IX)
- Tsunami: 3 m (9.8 ft)
- Foreshocks: mb 4.4 and mb 4.3 on 01/13/2002
- Aftershocks: 359+ (14 felt, as of March 15, 2002); Strongest: M_{wb} 6.0 on March 8
- Casualties: 15 fatalities, 100 injuries

The 2002 Mindanao earthquake struck the Philippines at 05:16:09 Philippine Standard Time on March 6 (21:16 UTC on March 5). The world's sixth most powerful earthquake of the year, it registered a magnitude of 7.5 and was a megathrust earthquake. It originated near the Cotabato Trench, a zone of deformation situated between the Philippine Sea plate and the Sunda plate, and occurred very near to the Philippines' strongest earthquake for the 20th century, the 1918 Celebes Sea earthquake.

The entire country is characterized by a high level of volcanic and seismic activity. The earthquake was responsible for 15 deaths and roughly 100 injuries. Up to 800 buildings were damaged as a result, many from flooding generated by landslides near Mount Parker and falling debris. Like the 1918 event, a tsunami soon followed.

== Tectonic setting ==
The 2002 event (7.5 M_{w}) occurred near the two largest 20th century Philippine earthquakes: the 1918 Celebes Sea earthquake (8.3 M_{w}) and the 1976 Moro Gulf earthquake (8.0 M_{w}).

The Sunda and Philippine Sea Plates, where the earthquake occurred, converge at a rate of 6 centimeters (2 in) each year. The Philippines sits on several microplates between two convergent plates, the Philippine Plate and the Eurasian plate. Tectonic activity in the country includes both earthquakes and volcanic eruptions. Because of subduction of the Eurasian plate to the west, volcanic activity occurs along the Manila Trench and the Sulu Trench, often of powerful caliber. 13 percent of recorded eruptions in the Philippines have been deadly, as the country is responsible for the world's most deaths in volcanic eruptions. Seismicity as well has been powerful: in the last 50 years, more than half of the country's major earthquakes have reached magnitude 7.0 or greater. The earliest known major shock was in 1976, killing some 8,000 people. The 2002 event was the fourth of seven major events since 1976.

== Earthquake ==
With a moment magnitude (M_{w}) of 7.5, the earthquake was the sixth strongest of the year. It occurred in a zone of geologic deformation along the Sunda and Philippine Sea Plates, as the result of shallow oblique-reverse faulting within the Sunda Plate. Focal mechanism solutions indicate that the earthquake rupture occurred on either a moderately dipping, southeast-striking fault, or on a thrust fault dipping shallowly towards the northeast. Of these two possible fault orientations, finite-fault modeling of globally recorded seismic data is more consistent with slip on the northwest-striking thrust fault. It had a rupture area of 200 km (120 mi) x 85 km (53 mi), extending from Datu Blah T. Sinsuat in Maguindanao del Norte to Glan in Sarangani, with a maximum slip of 1.871 m (6.14 ft) near the hypocenter. The observed source time function gives a 30 second duration for the earthquake, with the greatest phase of seismic moment release occurring about 10 seconds after initiation.

The earthquake had a maximum intensity of IX (Violent) on the Modified Mercalli intensity scale. On the PHIVOLCS earthquake intensity scale, intensity IX (Devastating) was registered at Palimbang, while VIII (Very destructive) was assigned to Maitum and Kiamba, VII (Destructive) at Lake Sebu and Koronadal, and V–VI (Strong to Very strong) at Cotabato City, General Santos City and Alabel.

According to the Philippine Institute of Volcanology and Seismology (PHIVOLCS), 359 aftershocks were recorded by March 15, of which 11 were felt. The United States Geological Survey (USGS) recorded 99 aftershocks exceeding M_{w} 4.0 by the end of 2002, with two foreshocks measuring mb 4.4 and mb 4.3 occurring on January 16. The most powerful aftershock measured M_{w} 6.0, and occurred at 18:27 UTC on March 8. Most of these aftershocks occurred southeast of the mainshock's epicenter.

== Damage and casualties ==
Killing 15 people and injuring roughly 100 more, the earthquake affected about 800 homes throughout the southern and central parts of Mindanao. At least 33 of the damaged homes completely collapsed, while seven bridges, 36 school buildings, one hospital, two health centres, and 17 public buildings were also damaged. Two people in Lake Sebu were killed when their house collapsed, while two others were killed by collapsing buildings in Maitum, and four people, including one each from Tacurong City and Davao City, died of cardiac arrests. One man was also fatally electrocuted by a power line damaged by the earthquake. As it is a superstition among Muslims to fire guns during earthquakes to drive away evil spirits, one death and one injury were both accidentally caused by earthquake-related gunfire in Cotabato City.

The earthquake spawned landslides in South Cotabato which flowed through the crater lake on Mount Parker, causing widespread flooding which swept away homes, affected at least nine sub-districts of the province and killed three people. The landslide and subsequent flooding also created local tsunamis reaching a maximum height of 3 meters (10 ft) at Kiamba, Maitum and Palimbang.

The earthquake was powerful enough to knock over concrete walls and fences. One major road was heavily damaged by the shaking. In Tupi, two churches were damaged. At least 100 workers at a tuna cannery in General Santos were injured due to a stampede involving 1,000 workers, which was attributed to the quake. The city, as well as Davao and Zamboanga, suffered power outages. Severe damage to a high school, a hotel, the Philippine National Police headquarters, water tanks and other buildings were reported in General Santos. In Koronadal City, a transporter bridge, an elementary school and other buildings were affected. Two churches, a health centre and a public market were also destroyed in Sultan Kudarat and South Cotabato Provinces.

== See also ==
- 1918 Celebes Sea earthquake
- 1976 Moro Gulf earthquake
- 2026 Mindanao earthquake
- List of earthquakes in 2002
- List of earthquakes in the Philippines
