= Legazpi =

Legazpi or Legaspi may refer to:

- Miguel López de Legazpi, Spanish conquistador who founded the first Spanish settlement in the Philippines

== Places ==
- Legaspi, Cagdianao, a barangay in the province of Dinagat Islands, Philippines
- Legazpi, Albay, capital city of the province of Albay, Philippines
- Legazpi (Madrid), a ward belonging to the district of Arganzuela
- Legazpi, Gipuzkoa, a town in the Basque Autonomous Community, Spain
- Roman Catholic Diocese of Legazpi, Philippines

== Other uses ==
- Legaspi (surname)
- Legazpi (Madrid Metro), a station on Line 3 and 6
- Jose Borromeo Legaspi Memorial National High School, a public secondary school located in Aklan, Philippines
