= November 2023 Mindanao earthquake =

Magnitude 6.7 earthquake in the Philippines

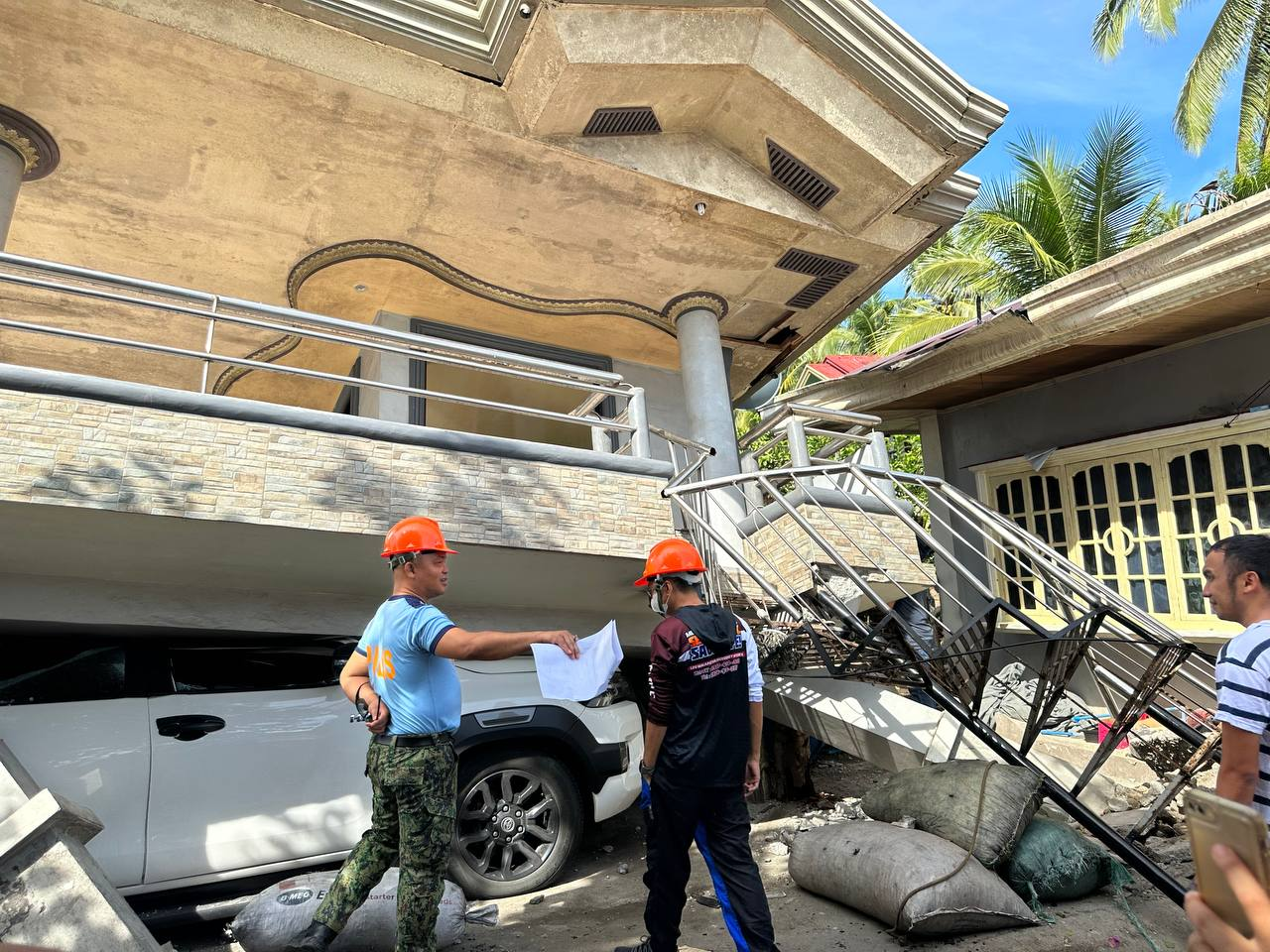
- A partially collapsed house in Malapatan, Sarangani

- Location within Mindanao
- UTC time: 2023-11-17 08:14:10
- ISC event: 635897768
- USGS-ANSS: ComCat
- Local date: November 17, 2023
- Local time: 16:14:10 PST (UTC+8)
- Magnitude: M_{w} 6.7–6.8
- Depth: 52.0 km (32.3 mi)
- Epicenter: 5.563°N 125.001°E
- Type: Reverse
- Areas affected: Mindanao
- Total damage: 21.9 million pesos (US$398,100) (as of 21/11/2023)
- Max. intensity: PEIS VIII (MMI VIII)
- Landslides: Yes
- Casualties: 11 dead, 730 injured

At 16:14 PST (08:14 UTC) on November 17, 2023, the province of Sarangani on the island of Mindanao in the Philippines was struck by an earthquake measuring M_{ww} 6.7 or M_{w} 6.8. It had a maximum perceived intensity of VIII (Severe) on the Modified Mercalli Intensity Scale. At least eleven people were killed and another 730 were treated for injuries.

== Tectonic setting ==
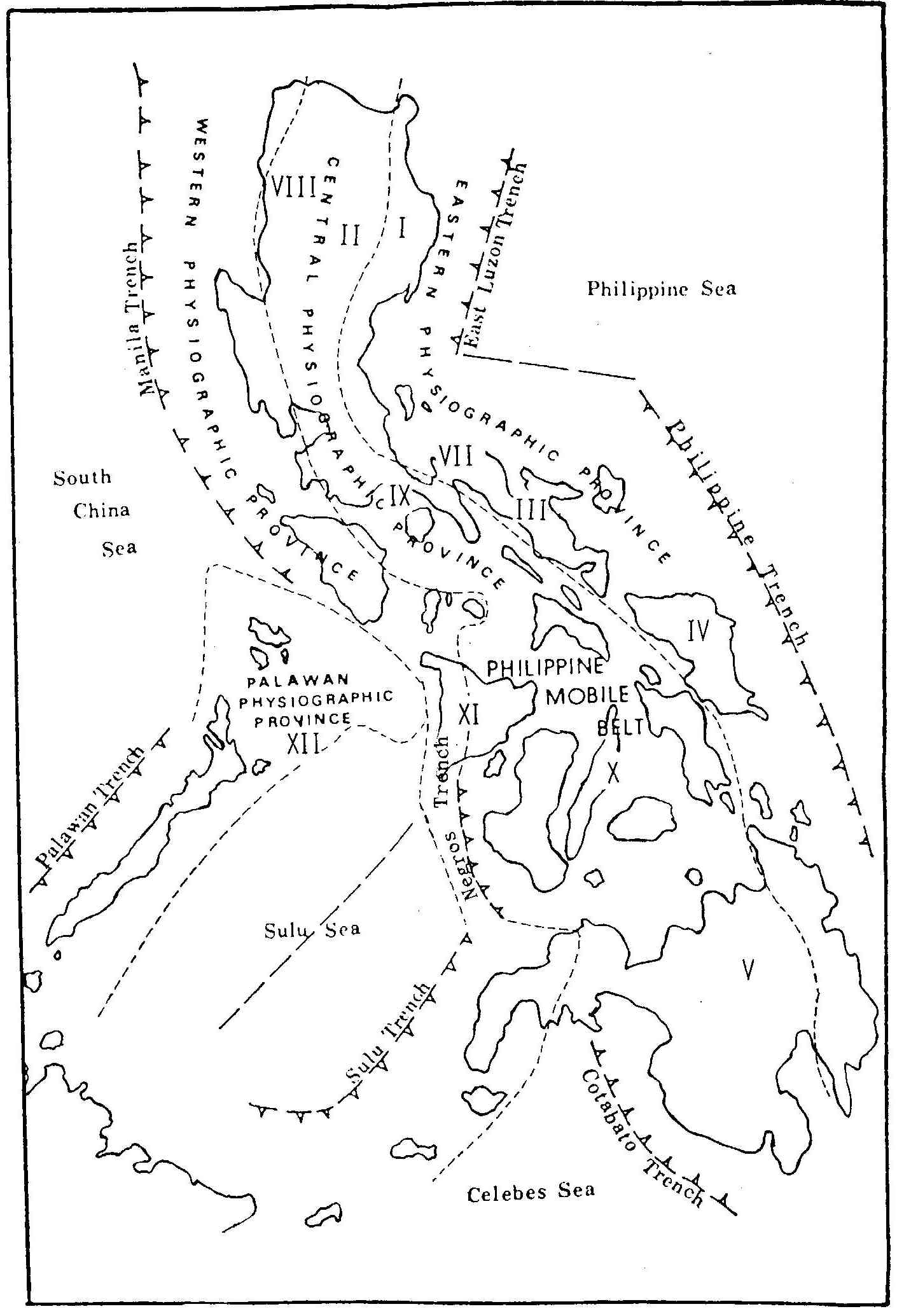
The Cotabato Trench in southern Mindanao and the Philippine Mobile Belt.

Mindanao lies across the complex convergent boundary between the Sunda plate and the Philippine Sea plate. Part of the oblique convergence between these plates is taken up by subduction along the Cotabato Trench. The strike-slip component of the convergence is accommodated partly by the Philippine fault system and partly by the Cotabato Fault System, a network of mainly NW-SE trending sinistral (left-lateral) strike-slip faults that form the boundary between the Cotabato Arc and the Central Mindanao Volcanic Belt. In 1976, a magnitude 8.1 earthquake and tsunami along the same trench killed 8,000 people.

== Earthquake ==
The focal mechanism and depth corresponded to an earthquake of reverse-faulting at an intermediate depth. On the PHIVOLCS earthquake intensity scale (PEIS), intensity VII (Destructive) was instrumentally recorded in Glan, Sarangani. Intensity VI was reported in General Santos as well as in Polomolok and Koronadal, South Cotabato. At least 120 aftershocks followed, six of which were felt. The largest aftershock struck four days after the initial quake, measuring 5.2 mb according to the USGS or 4.9 M_{w} according to PHIVOLCS. The tremor was also felt in neighboring Indonesia, measuring intensity V on the Modified Mercalli intensity scale at Naha, IV at Ondong, and III at Bolaang Mongondow, Manado, Bitung, Tomohon and North Minahasa.

== Impact ==
At least 11 people were killed while 730 others were injured, including 450 due to panic. Of the dead, three were from General Santos, four in Glan, Sarangani, and one each from Jose Abad Santos, Davao Occidental and Malapatan, Sarangani. Among the dead were a couple killed by a collapsed wall, a woman killed by falling debris at a mall, and an old man killed by a rockfall. The bodies of a mother and a child who were initially reported missing after a landslide were both recovered the next day after the quake. At least 85 people were injured in Glan alone. Many students were injured while escaping in panic from a gymnasium in General Santos. Two people were believed to have died from panic-induced strokes while a third was killed by falling steel. Five people were injured in Koronadal. Ground cracks and landslides occurred in some parts of Sarangani, including Glan.

At least 542 houses collapsed; 517 in Soccksargen and 25 more in the Davao Region. Up to 8,799 others were damaged, including 8,492 in Soccksargen and 307 others in the Davao Region. Sixteen roads and five bridges were also affected. Power outages occurred across 21 areas, all of which were restored. The Department of Social Welfare and Development estimated that 8,586 houses in Sarangani suffered varying levels of damage, 456 of which collapsed, with 295 homes destroyed and 4,752 others damaged in Glan alone, while 3,253 homes were damaged in Malapatan, 136 of them seriously. Damage to roads in Sarangani amounted to P21.9 million. The municipal hall of Glan and a school were rendered unsafe for use after sustaining significant damage, while the town's port was also closed after its left wing collapsed, with a 30-meter section of the wharf believed to have sunk. Another jetty and a school covered court were tilted.

A landslide blocked a road between Glan and Malapatan, while the sea receded near the coast of Alabel. One building collapsed in Tampakan, two malls were damaged in Koronadal, and in Jose Abad Santos, 11 homes collapsed and 129 others and several schools were damaged. Sixteen schools as well as some police stations were affected, while 54 fishing boats were damaged. In Davao City, part of a crane and its load broke off from a high-rise condominium that was under construction and fell on top of a house in the Matina district. In South Cotabato, 257 homes were affected, 45 of which collapsed, including 43 in Polomolok alone.

== Response ==
Sarangani governor Rogelio Pacquiao suspended face-to-face classes at all levels in the province on 20–21 November to allow inspections on school buildings and imposed work-from-home arrangements in government offices. The mayor of Glan pledged financial assistance of P10,000 to homeowners who suffered partial damage and a larger, undecided amount for those with totally damaged homes. The town was placed under a state of calamity on 21 November.

The Department of Social Welfare and Development vowed to give financial aid to the affected families with the Disaster Response Management Group's ₱1.34 billion food and non-food assistance fund. The agency reported 140,579 family food packs that were ready for distribution at local offices in Northern Mindanao, Davao, and Soccsksargen. The National Disaster Risk Reduction and Management Council's response cluster was immediately dispatched to inspect and respond to impacted areas moments after the earthquake.

President Bongbong Marcos, who was on a six-day visit to the United States for the Asia-Pacific Economic Cooperation summit in San Francisco when the earthquake struck, said that he would proceed with his overseas trip unless a necessity arose that only he could respond to, but ordered an immediate response from all available government agencies. He later visited General Santos on 23 November to inspect the damage and distribute aid, during which he was accompanied by athlete and former senator Manny Pacquiao, who comes from the region. On 19 November, Vice President Sara Duterte attended a wake for victims of the earthquake in Glan and visited injured patients at the Sarangani Provincial Hospital.

== See also ==
- List of earthquakes in 2023
- List of earthquakes in the Philippines
- 2026 Mindanao earthquake
