= Bucana Bridge =

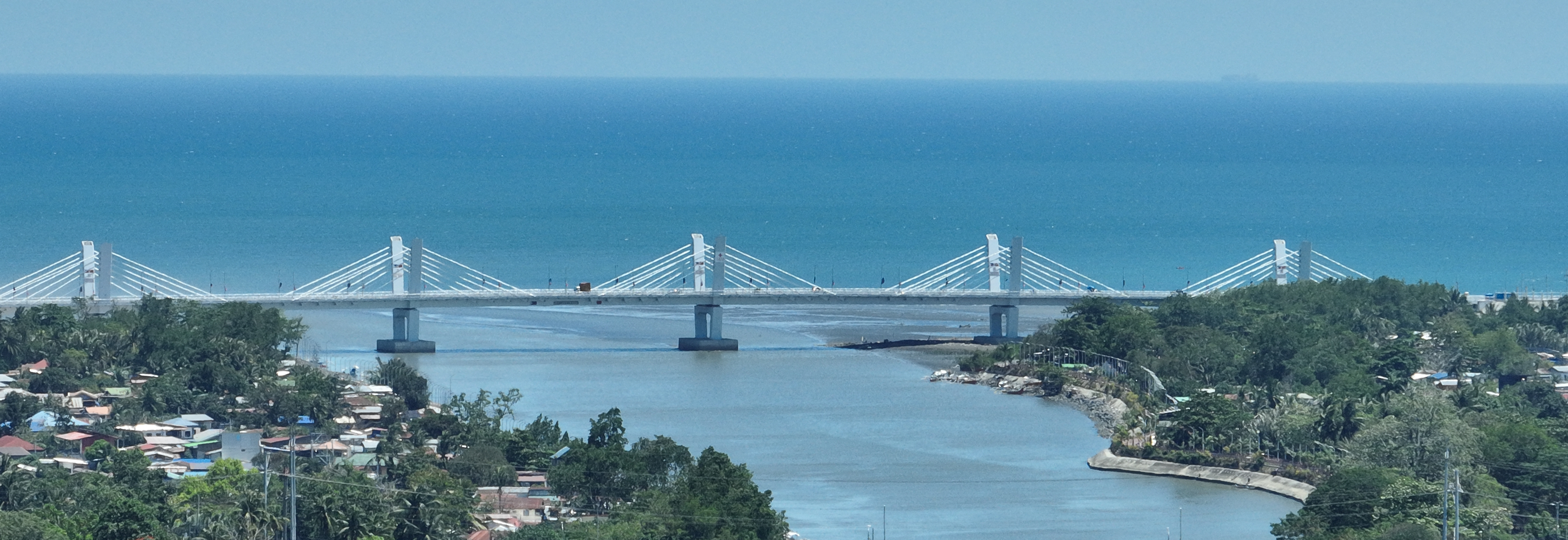
- The Bucana Bridge
- Coordinates: 7°02′51.6″N 125°36′27.7″E
- Carries: 4 lanes of N916 (Davao City Coastal Road); pedestrian sidewalks
- Crosses: Davao River
- Locale: Davao City
- Official name: Bucana Bridge
- Maintained by: Department of Public Works and Highways
- Preceded by: Bolton Bridge

Characteristics
- Total length: 1,340 m (4,396 ft)
- Height: 19.5 m (64 ft)

History
- Constructed by: China Road and Bridge Corporation
- Construction start: November 2023
- Opened: December 19, 2025

Statistics
- Toll: No

Location
- Interactive map of Bucana Bridge

The Bucana Bridge is a four-lane extradosed bridge in Davao City, Philippines.

== History ==
=== Conceptualization ===
The Bucana Bridge was part of the then-named Davao River Bridge Project under the administration of President Rodrigo Duterte and the Chinese government. An exchange of letters related to the project was signed on November 20, 2018 when Chinese President Xi Jinping made a state visit to the Philippines. The bridge project was funded under the China's Official Development Assistance.

The implementation agreement between Chinese and the Philippine government was signed on October 20, 2023 under the presidency of Bongbong Marcos. Then-DPWH Secretary Manuel Bonoan signed the civil works contract with the China Road and Bridge Corporation (CRBC) on November 10, 2023.

=== Construction and opening ===
Construction for the bridge led by the DPWH Unified Project Management Office – Bridges Management Cluster and the CRBC began in November 2023. By January 2025 it is 73 percent complete and by August 2025, 94 percent.

On December 4, 2025, President Marcos visited and inspected the site pledging to open the bridge on December 15. Mayor Sebastian Duterte condemned the plan as "premature" allegedly due to safety issues. The national government postponed the event. The bridge officially opened on December 19, 2025.

== Specification ==
The Bucana Bridge is a four-lane extradosed bridge that is part of the Davao City Coastal Road and traverses over the Davao River. It is 1,340 meters (4,396 ft) long and has five 19.5-meter (64 ft) pylons860 meters (2,822 ft) of the bridge were approach roads.
