= Sarangani Bay =

Bay in the Philippines

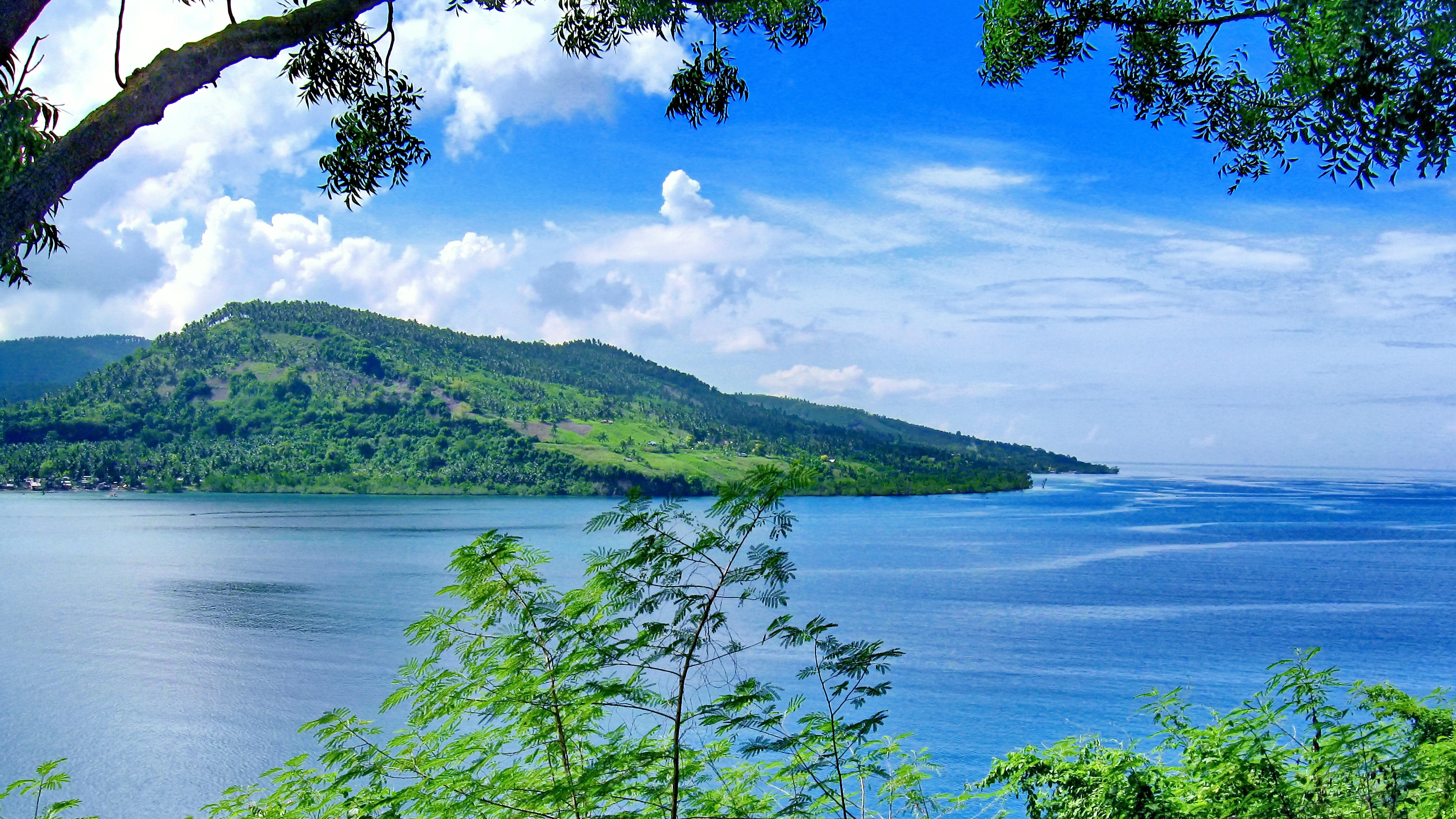
- View of the bay along the road en route to Glan, Sarangani

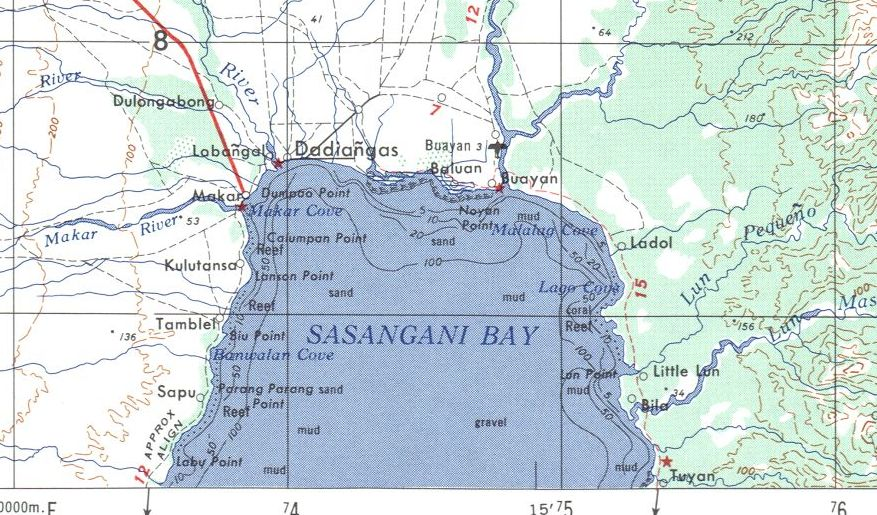
- North part of Sarangani Bay

- Location within Philippines
- Location: Southern Mindanao, Philippines
- Coordinates: 05°58′N 125°11′E
- Max. length: 33 km (21 mi)
- Max. width: 16 km (9.9 mi)

Sarangani Bay is a bay located on the southern tip of Mindanao in the Philippines. It opens up to the Celebes Sea on the Pacific Ocean. General Santos, one of the Philippines most important cities and ports, is located at the head of the bay, making the bay one of the busiest and often the site of shipping accidents. The province of Sarangani, created in 1992, is named after the bay.

Sarangani Bay was declared a national park under Republic Act No. 11038 (Expanded National Integrated Protected Areas System Act of 2018) signed by President Rodrigo Duterte in July 2018.

== Gallery ==
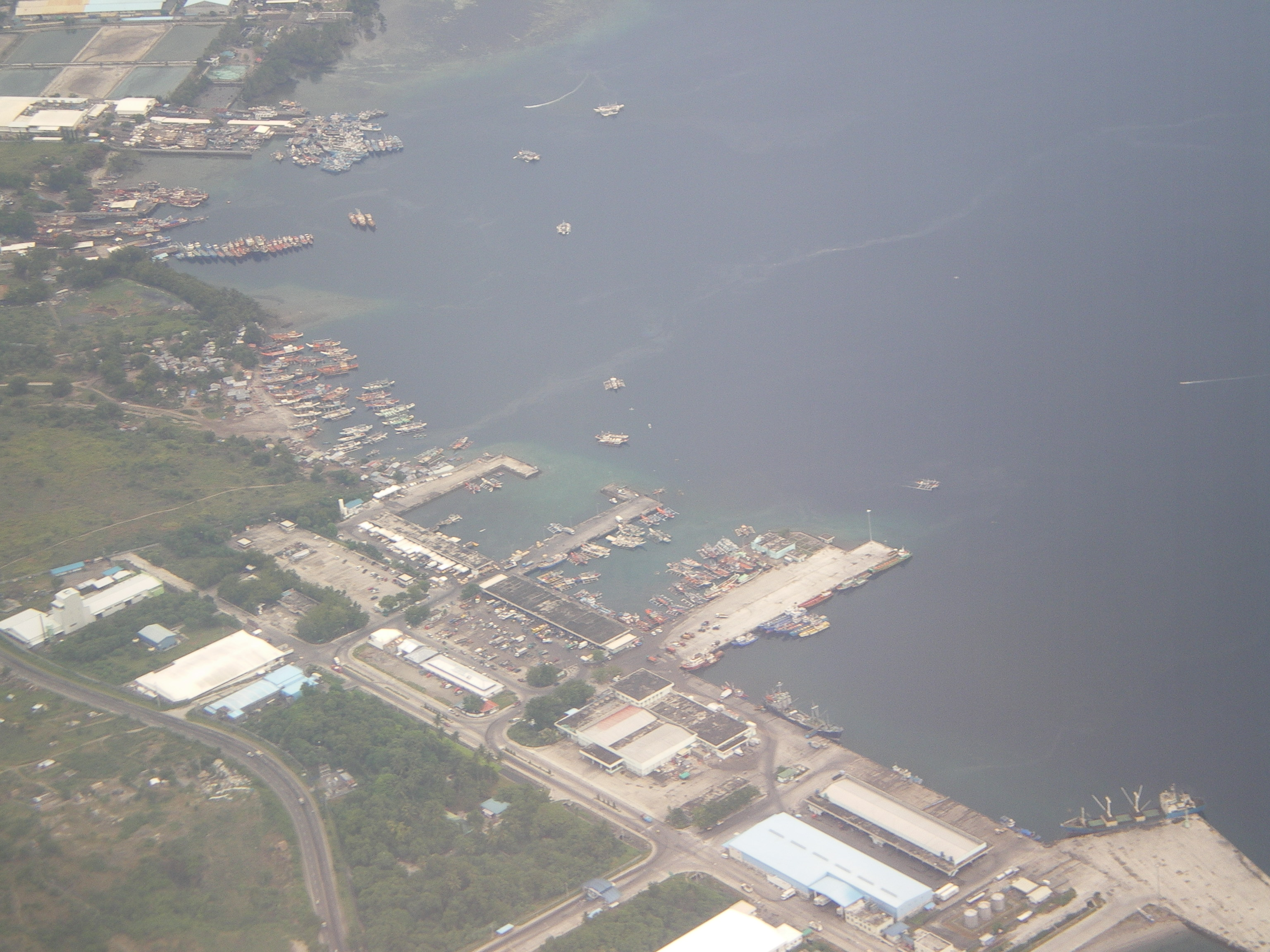
An aerial view of the bay showing the port of General Santos

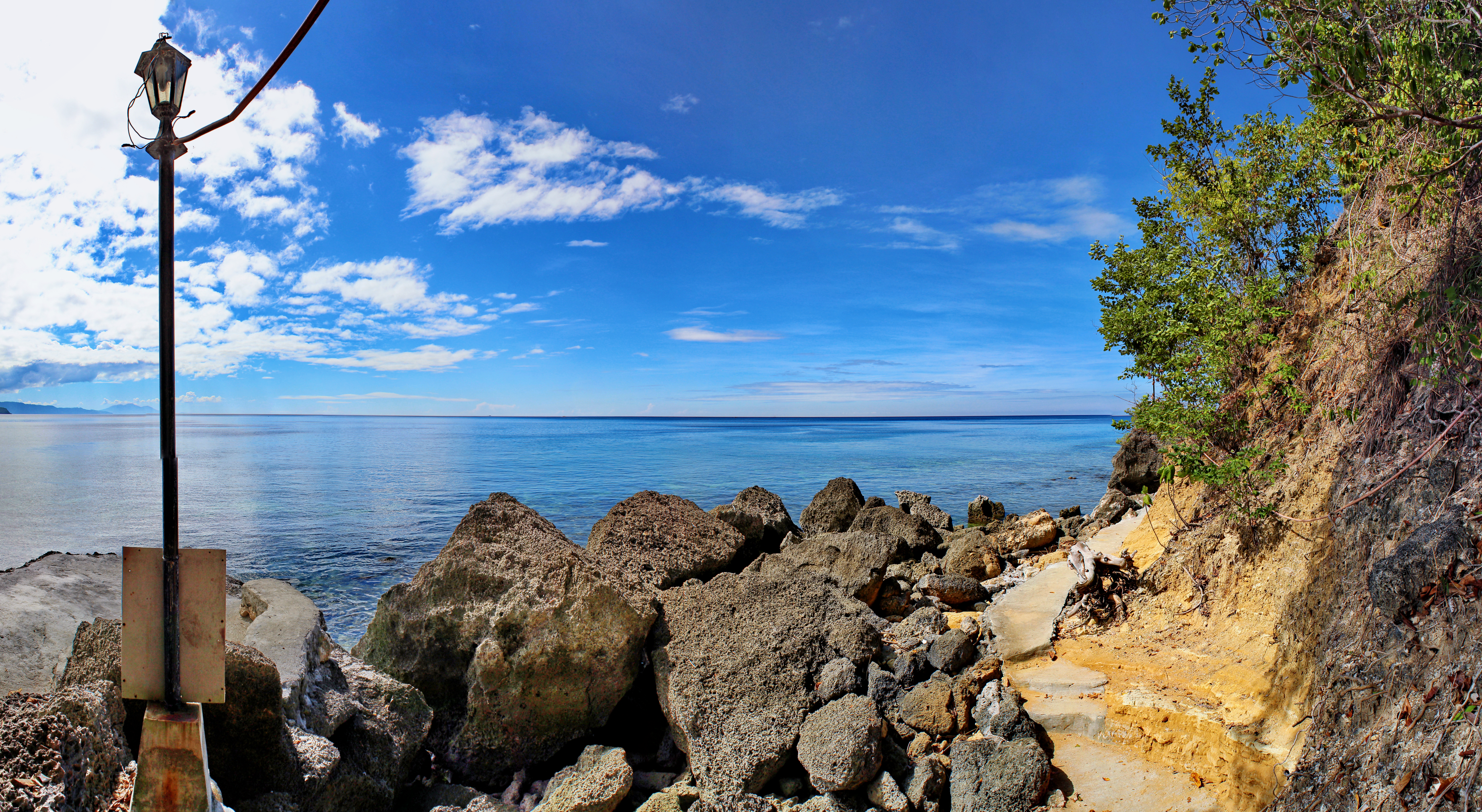
Sarangani Bay is one of the protected seascapes in the Philippines.

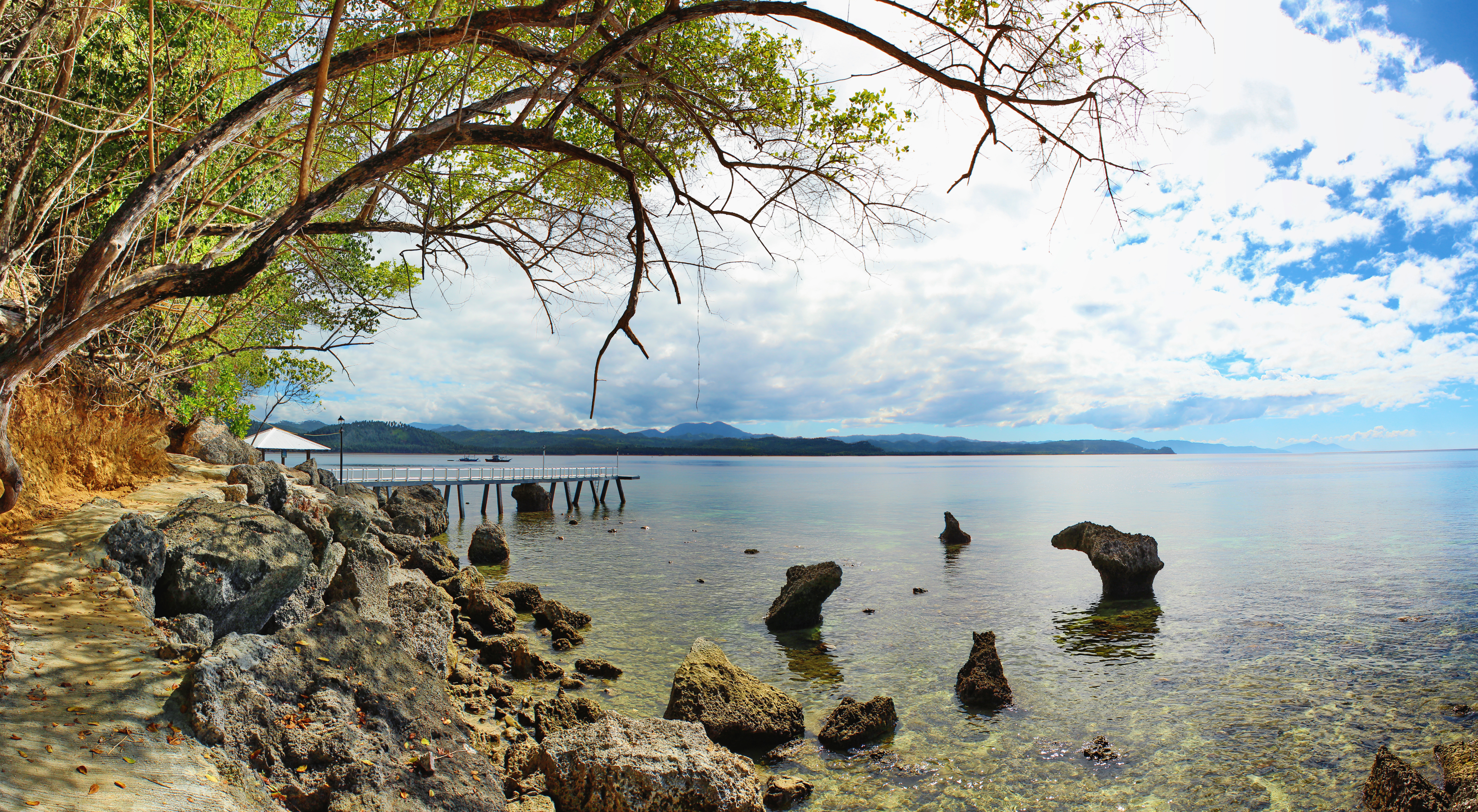
Another view of the bay
