= Cotabato Trench =

Oceanic trench in the Pacific Ocean

Coordinates: 6.0°N 123.6°E

Large and notable instrumentally recorded earthquakes in the Cotabato Trench.

The Cotabato Trench is an oceanic trench in the Pacific Ocean, off the southwestern coast of Mindanao in the Philippines. Along this trench the oceanic crust of the Sunda Plate beneath the Celebes Sea is being subducted beneath the Philippines Mobile Belt. It forms part of a linked set of trenches along the western side of the Philippines formed over east-dipping subduction zones, including the Manila Trench and the Negros Trench. At its northern end the rate of convergence across this boundary is about 100 mm per year. It is a relatively young structure, forming during the late Miocene to Pliocene. This age is consistent with the estimated age of the sedimentary rocks in the accretionary wedge associated with the trench and the age of adakitic arc rocks on Mindanao thought to date the onset of subduction.

== Seismicity ==
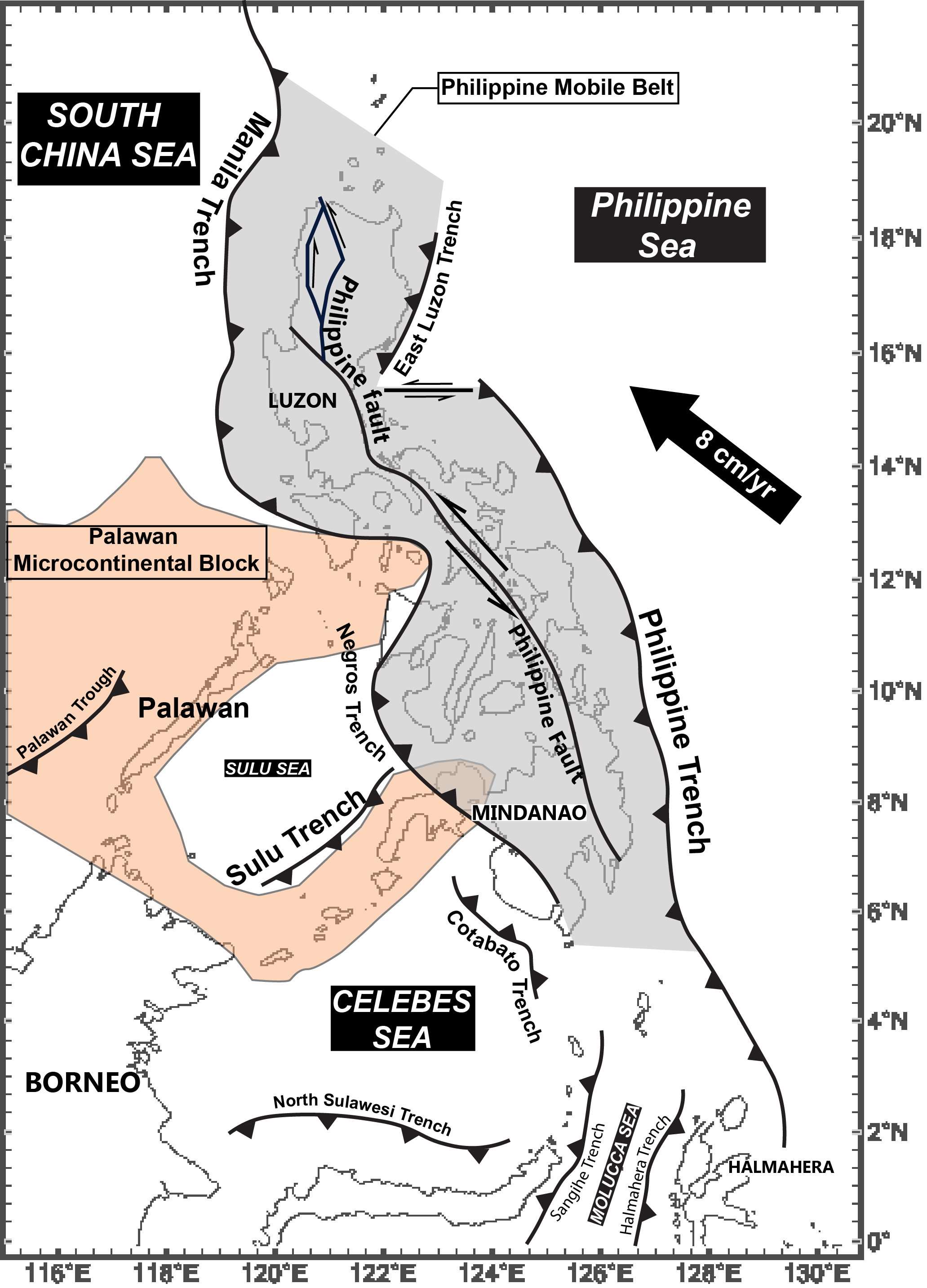
Main tectonic structures around the Philippines

The trench is associated with large megathrust earthquakes, including the 1913 Sulawesi–Mindanao earthquake (M 7.9), the 1918 Celebes Sea earthquake (M 8.3), the 1976 Moro Gulf earthquake (M 8.0), the 2002 Mindanao earthquake (M 7.5), and the 2026 Mindanao earthquake (M 7.8).

== Tsunami hazard ==
The Cotabato Trench is one of the main structure around the Philippines likely to be associated with tsunamigenic earthquakes. The tsunami generated by the 1976 earthquake caused about 4,000 deaths on Mindanao. Modelling of likely further tsunamis along the Cotabato Trench suggests that run-ups of several metres are likely for future earthquakes similar in size to the 1976 event.

In January 2026, an earthquake swarm along the trench with magnitudes ranging from 1.4 to 5.2 forced the closure of schools and government offices in Sultan Kudarat. On June 8, 2026, a magnitude 7.8 earthquake was generated by the trench.
