= 2019 Sarangani local elections =

Philippine election

2019 Sarangani gubernatorial election
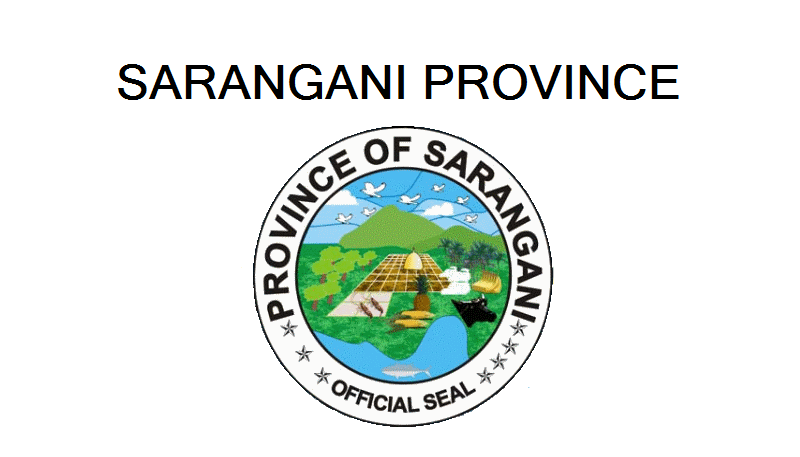
- May 13, 2019
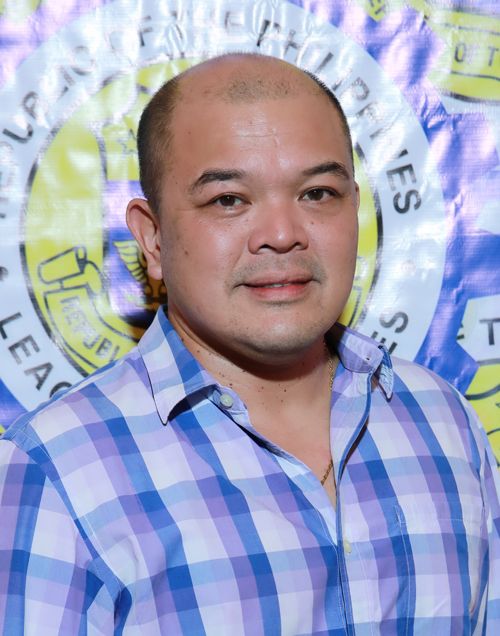
Nominee	Steve Solon	Mohamad Bong Aquia
Party	PDP-Laban	Independent
Running mate	Elmer de Peralta	Willie Dangane
Popular vote	175,010	27,742
Governor before election
Steve Solon
PCM
Elected Governor
Steve Solon
PCM/PDP-Laban

Local elections were held in the Province of Sarangani on May 13, 2019, within the Philippine general election. Voters selected candidates for all local positions: a town mayor, vice mayor and town councilors, as well as members of the Sangguniang Panlalawigan, the vice-governor, governor, and a representative for the lone district of Sarangani.

== Provincial Elections ==
The candidates for governor and vice-governor with the highest number of votes are elected; they are voted for separately, therefore, they may be from different parties.

=== Candidates for Governor ===
Parties are as stated in their certificates of candidacy.

Sarangani gubernatorial election
Party	Candidate	Votes	%
PDP–Laban	Steve Solon	175,010	
Independent	Mohamad Bong Aquia	27,742	
Total votes			100.00
PDP–Laban hold			

=== Candidates for Vice Governor ===
Parties are as stated in their certificates of candidacy.

Sarangani vice gubernatorial election
Party	Candidate	Votes	%
PCM	Elmer de Peralta	146,750	
Independent	Willie Dangane	26,825	
Total votes			100.00
PCM hold			

=== Candidates for Congressman ===
Parties are as stated in their certificate of candidacies.

Sarangani congressional election
Party	Candidate	Votes	%
PDP–Laban	Rogelio Ruel Pacquiao	182,491	
Independent	Jacob Arroyo	9,729	
Total votes			100.00
PDP–Laban hold			

=== Sangguniang Panlalawigan Elections ===
All 2 Districts of Sarangani will elect Sangguniang Panlalawigan or provincial board members.

==== 1st District (West Coast) ====
- Municipalities: Kiamba, Maitum, Maasim

Parties are as stated in their certificate of candidacies.

Sarangani 1st District Sangguniang Panlalawigan election
Party	Candidate	Votes	%
PCM	Russell Jamora	38,877	
PCM	George Falgui	37,648	
PCM	Jess Bascuña	28,188	
PCM	Rosemarie Sayo	27,805	
Independent	Jeanne Ablog	25,454	
PFP	Rizalina Zamorro-Lucero	15,820	
Independent	Kubli Kuso	14,658	
Total votes			100.00

==== 2nd District (East Coast) ====
- Municipalities: Alabel, Glan, Malapatan, Malungon

Parties are as stated in their certificate of candidacies.

Sarangani 2nd District Sangguniang Panlalawigan election
Party	Candidate	Votes	%
PCM	Ephraim Tata Galzote	76,394	
PCM	Irish Arnado	76,302	
PCM	Joseph Calanao	68,483	
PCM	Corazon Grafilo	62,409	
PCM	Arman Guili	60,878	
PCM	Jose Tranquilino Ruiz	55,644	
Independent	Roy Yap	25,894	
Independent	Jorge Liansing Jr.	23,963	
Independent	Toto Beldad	19,174	
Independent	Menandro Dambong	18,320	
Independent	Ferdinand Belimac	15,346	
Independent	Elson Formoso	13,709	
Total votes			100.00

== Mayoralty Elections ==
All municipalities of Sarangani will elect mayor and vice-mayor this election. The candidates for mayor and vice mayor with the highest number of votes wins the seat; they are voted separately, therefore, they may be of different parties when elected. Below is the list of mayoralty candidates of each city and municipalities per district.

=== 1st District (West Coast) ===
- Municipalities: Kiamba, Maasim, Maitum

==== Kiamba ====
Kiamba mayoralty election
Party	Candidate	Votes	%
PCM	Danny Martinez	20,489	
Independent	Arnulfo Flores	5,021	
Total votes			

Kiamba vice mayoralty election
Party	Candidate	Votes	%
PCM	Marie Jess Ancheta	18,109	
Independent	Dexter Rojas	5,801	
Total votes			

==== Maasim ====
Maasim mayoralty election
Party	Candidate	Votes	%
PCM	Zyrex Pacquiao	14,107	
NPC	Uttoh Salem Cutan	11,365	
PFP	Jocelyn Zamorro-Espina	2,644	
Independent	Jun Lopez	445	
Total votes			

Maasim vice mayoralty election
Party	Candidate	Votes	%
PCM	Visitation Nambatac	10,575	
PFP	Geofray Carnalna	7,545	
Independent	Jerum Lawa Sr.	4,816	
Independent	Asumpta Fernandez	1,942	
Independent	Ruperto Legaspina	1,473	
Total votes			

==== Maitum ====
Maitum mayoralty election
Party	Candidate	Votes	%
PCM	Alexander Bryan Reganit	14,596	
NPC	Samson Estabillo	5,919	
Total votes			

Maitum vice mayoralty election
Party	Candidate	Votes	%
PDP–Laban	Tito Balazon	13,217	
Independent	Pepito Catimbang	4,399	
Independent	Leodivico Ramos	2,081	
Total votes			

=== 2nd District (East Coast) ===
- Municipalities: Alabel, Glan, Malapatan, Malungon

==== Alabel ====
Alabel mayoralty election
Party	Candidate	Votes	%
PCM	Vic Paul Salarda	25,184	
PFP	Elenito Senit	11,885	
Independent	Emilio Cababat	826	
Total votes			

Alabel vice mayoralty election
Party	Candidate	Votes	%
PCM	Ronnel Español	21,564	
Total votes			

==== Glan ====
Glan mayoralty election
Party	Candidate	Votes	%
PDP–Laban	Vivien Yap	23,958	
Independent	Cyril Yap	11,130	
PFP	Enrique Yap, Jr.	9,083	
Total votes			

Glan vice mayoralty election
Party	Candidate	Votes	%
PDP–Laban	Victor James Yap, Sr.	26,877	
Independent	Arsenio Corsame Jr.	7,432	
PFP	Victor Tan	6,162	
Independent	Benjie Dad	1,374	
Total votes			

==== Malapatan ====
Malapatan mayoralty election
Party	Candidate	Votes	%
Independent	Salway Sumbo	13,518	
PCM	Abdulracman Pangolima	9,212	
NPC	Gwynn Singcoy	4,450	
Independent	Andy Cepe	2,745	
Total votes			

Malapatan vice mayoralty election
Party	Candidate	Votes	%
Independent	Jean Delos Santos	13,877	
PCM	Jimmy Bagit	13,061	
Total votes			

==== Malungon ====
Malungon mayoralty election
Party	Candidate	Votes	%
PCM	Tessa Constantino	40,202	
Independent	Julian Niñeza	4,430	
Total votes			

Malungon vice mayoralty election
Party	Candidate	Votes	%
PCM	Jun Escalada	26,431	
Independent	Modesto Aban	15,702	
Total votes			
