= 2016 Sarangani local elections =

2016 Sarangani gubernatorial election
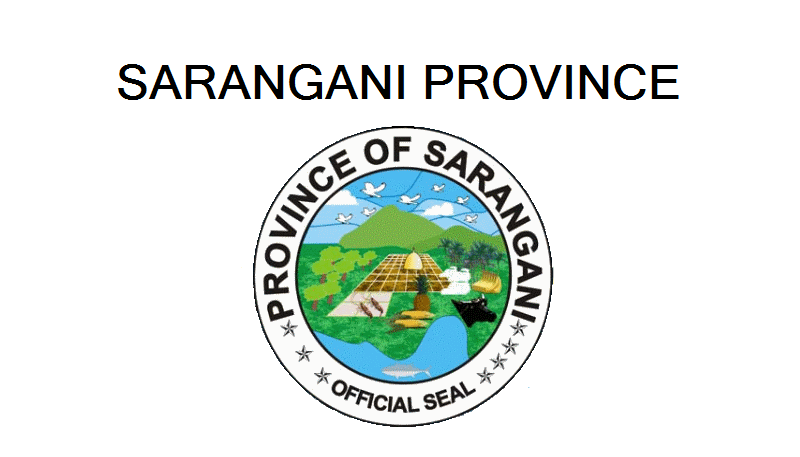
- May 9, 2016
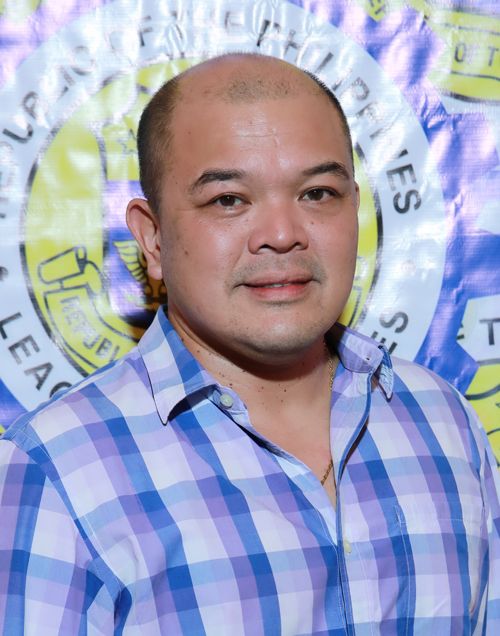
| Nominee | Steve Solon | Mohamad Bong Aquia | Juan Domino |
| Party | PCM | Liberal | NPC |
| Running mate | Elmer de Peralta | Willie Dangane |
| Popular vote | 139,446 | 27,554 | 15,082 |
Governor before election
Steve Solon
UNA/PCM
Elected Governor
Steve Solon
PCM

Local elections were held in the Province of Sarangani on May 9, 2016, within the Philippine general election. Voters selected candidates for all local positions: a town mayor, vice mayor and town councilors, as well as members of the Sangguniang Panlalawigan, the vice-governor, governor, and a representative for the lone district of Sarangani.

== Provincial Elections ==
The candidates for governor and vice governor with the highest number of votes win the seat; they are voted for separately, therefore, they may be from different parties.

=== Candidates for Governor ===
Parties are as stated in their certificates of candidacies.

Sarangani gubernatorial election
| Party | Candidate | Votes | % |
|---|---|---|---|
| PCM | Steve Solon | 139,446 | |
| Liberal | Mohamad Bong Aquia | 27,554 | |
| NPC | Juan Domino | 15,082 | |
| Total votes | | | 100.00 |
| PCM hold | | | |

=== Candidates for Vice Governor ===
Parties are as stated in their certificate of candidacies.

Sarangani vice gubernatorial election
| Party | Candidate | Votes | % |
|---|---|---|---|
| PCM | Elmer de Peralta | 108,126 | |
| Liberal | Willie Dangane | 36,641 | |
| Total votes | | | 100.00 |
| PCM hold | | | |

=== Sangguniang Panlalawigan Elections ===
All 2 Districts of Sarangani will elect Sangguniang Panlalawigan or provincial board members.

==== 1st District (West Coast) ====
- Municipalities: Kiamba, Maitum, Maasim

Parties are as stated in their certificate of candidacies.

Sarangani 1st District Sangguniang Panlalawigan election
| Party | Candidate | Votes | % |
|---|---|---|---|
| PCM | George Falgui | 29,932 | |
| PCM | Cornelio Martinez Jr. | 24,944 | |
| PCM | Jess Bascuña | 22,007 | |
| PCM | Rosemarie Sayo | 20,437 | |
| Liberal | Arturo Lawa | 17,018 | |
| NPC | Nicanor Ballan | 13,746 | |
| NPC | Rosemarie Young | 12,306 | |
| NPC | Oying Estabillo | 8,253 | |
| Liberal | Musa Solaiman | 6,776 | |
| KBL | Dexter Rojas | 6,402 | |
| Liberal | Leodivico Ramos | 5,676 | |
| Liberal | Abednego Boone | 5,122 | |
| Independent | Pirot Manguigin | 3,096 | |
| Total votes | | | 100.00 |

==== 2nd District (East Coast) ====
- Municipalities: Alabel, Glan, Malapatan, Malungon

Parties are as stated in their certificate of candidacies.

Sarangani 2nd District Sangguniang Panlalawigan election
| Party | Candidate | Votes | % |
|---|---|---|---|
| PCM | Cyril Yap | 64,802 | |
| PCM | Hermie Galzote | 60,244 | |
| PCM | Virgilio Tobias | 52,509 | |
| PCM | Arman Guili | 47,480 | |
| PCM | Beboy Nallos | 41,335 | |
| PCM | Abdulracman Pangolima | 41,052 | |
| Liberal | Annalie Edday | 40,944 | |
| Independent | Eugene Tata Alzate | 30,577 | |
| Liberal | Romeo Ogong Jr. | 22,846 | |
| NPC | Dindi Belimac | 16,436 | |
| Liberal | Restituto Lantingan Sr. | 14,899 | |
| Liberal | Gladden Lim | 9,111 | |
| Liberal | Jun Zagales | 8,502 | |
| Independent | Fernando Baton | 7,912 | |
| Total votes | | | 100.00 |
