= 2022 Sarangani local elections =

Philippine election

2022 Sarangani gubernatorial election
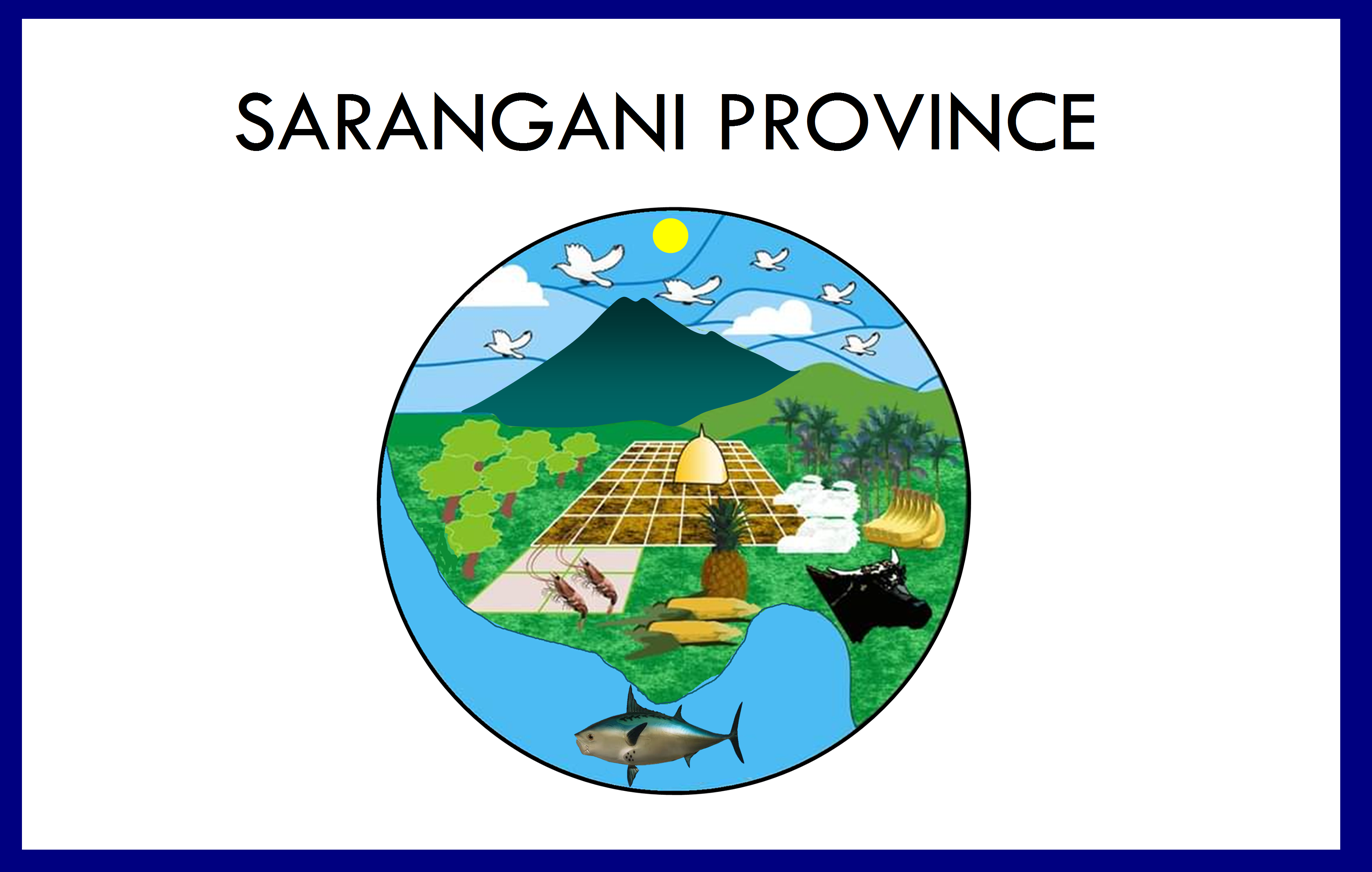
- May 9, 2022
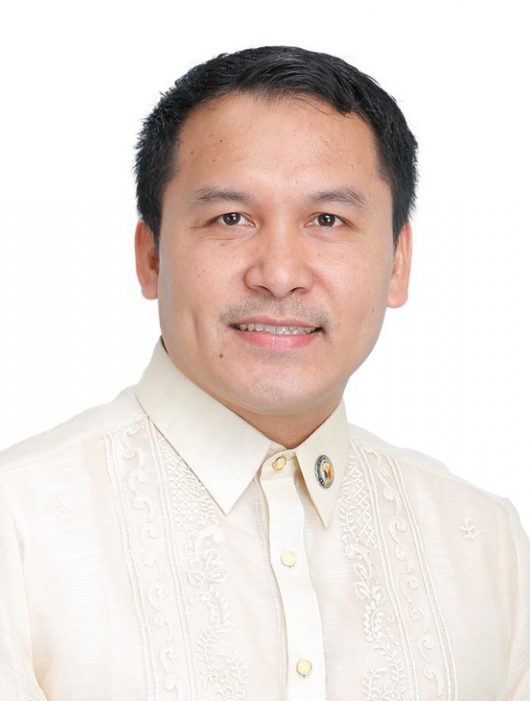
| Nominee | Rogelio Ruel Pacquiao | Mohamad Bong Aquia | Gladden Lim |
| Party | PCM | Aksyon | Independent |
| Running mate | Elmer de Peralta | Eleanor Saguiguit |
| Popular vote | 166,249 | 52,634 | 7,564 |
Governor before election
Steve Solon
PCM
Elected Governor
Ruel Pacquiao
PCM

Local elections were held in the Province of Sarangani on May 9, 2022, within the Philippine general election. Voters will select candidates for all local positions: a town mayor, vice mayor and town councilors, as well as members of the Sangguniang Panlalawigan, the vice-governor, governor and a representative for the lone district of Sarangani.

== Provincial Elections ==
The candidates for governor and vice governor with the highest number of votes wins the seat; they are voted separately, therefore, they may be of different parties when elected.

=== Candidates for Governor ===
Governor Steve Solon is term-limited and is vying for the congressional seat instead. His party nominated congressman Rogelio Ruel Pacquiao.

Parties are as stated in their certificate of candidacies.

Sarangani gubernatorial election
| Party | Candidate | Votes | % |
|---|---|---|---|
| PCM | Rogelio Ruel Pacquiao | 166,249 | 73.42 |
| Aksyon | Mohamad Bong Aquia | 52,634 | |
| Independent | Gladden Lim | 7,564 | |
| Total votes | | | 100.00 |
| PCM hold | | | |

=== Candidates for Vice Governor ===
Parties are as stated in their certificate of candidacies.

Sarangani vice gubernatorial election
| Party | Candidate | Votes | % |
|---|---|---|---|
| PCM | Elmer de Peralta | 146,068 | |
| Aksyon | Eleanor Saguiguit | 53,309 | |
| Total votes | | | 100.00 |
| PCM hold | | | |

=== Candidates for Congressman ===
Parties are as stated in their certificate of candidacies.

Sarangani congressional election
| Party | Candidate | Votes | % |
|---|---|---|---|
| PCM | Steve Solon | 204,076 | |
| PPM | Willie Dangane | 16,834 | |
| Total votes | | | 100.00 |
| PCM hold | | | |

=== Sangguniang Panlalawigan Elections ===
All 2 Districts of Sarangani will elect Sangguniang Panlalawigan or provincial board members.

| Party | Votes | % | Seats |
|---|---|---|---|
| People's Champ Movement | 567,505 | 70.61 | 10 |
| Aksyon Demokratiko | 127,772 | 15.90 | – |
| Partido Pederal ng Maharlika | 42,356 | 5.27 | – |
| Partido Federal ng Pilipinas | 13,552 | 1.69 | – |
| Independent | 52,510 | 6.53 | – |
| Ex officio seats | | | 3 |
| Reserved seats | | | 1 |
| Total | 803,695 | 100.00 | 14 |

==== 1st District (West Coast) ====
- Municipalities: Kiamba, Maitum, Maasim

Parties are as stated in their certificate of candidacies.

Sarangani 1st District Sangguniang Panlalawigan election
| Party | Candidate | Votes | % |
|---|---|---|---|
| PCM | Russell Jamora | 38,816 | |
| PCM | Jess Bascuña | 33,789 | |
| PCM | Arnold Abequibel | 31,982 | |
| PCM | Rosemarie Sayo | 31,737 | |
| Independent | Roy Abdul | 24,137 | |
| Aksyon | Bebing Mantua | 15,189 | |
| PFP | Ping Ibraham | 13,552 | |
| Aksyon | Manuel Chua | 8,209 | |
| Independent | Vigor Borris | 7,396 | |
| PPM | Solaiman Kamad | 6,576 | |
| Aksyon | Dexter Rojas | 6,300 | |
| PPM | Alemudin Dimatingkal | 3,262 | |
| Total votes | | | 100.00 |

==== 2nd District (East Coast) ====
- Municipalities: Alabel, Glan, Malapatan, Malungon

Parties are as stated in their certificate of candidacies.

Sarangani 2nd District Sangguniang Panlalawigan election
| Party | Candidate | Votes | % |
|---|---|---|---|
| PCM | Irish Arnado | 79,973 | |
| PCM | Ephraim Galzate | 75,187 | |
| PCM | Joseph Calanao | 73,154 | |
| PCM | Gywnn Singcoy | 68,825 | |
| PCM | Jose Tranquilino Ruiz | 67,250 | |
| PCM | Corazon Grafilo | 66,792 | |
| PPM | Jorge Liansing Jr. | 24,562 | |
| Independent | Abdulracman Pangolima | 20,977 | |
| Aksyon | Bobby Saya-ang | 17,732 | |
| Aksyon | Thong Pangolima | 17,638 | |
| Aksyon | Bogs Olarte | 17,352 | |
| Aksyon | Toto Beldad | 16,722 | |
| Aksyon | Ferdinand Belimac | 15,504 | |
| Aksyon | Gerry Bomes | 13,126 | |
| PPM | Jennie Barredo | 7,956 | |
| Total votes | | | 100.00 |

== Mayoralty Elections ==
All municipalities of Sarangani will elect mayor and vice-mayor this election. The candidates for mayor and vice mayor with the highest number of votes wins the seat; they are voted separately, therefore, they may be of different parties when elected. Below is the list of mayoralty candidates of each city and municipalities per district.

=== 1st District (West Coast) ===
- Municipalities: Kiamba, Maasim, Maitum

==== Kiamba ====
Kiamba mayoralty election
| Party | Candidate | Votes | % |
|---|---|---|---|
| PFP | George Falgui | 14,537 | |
| PCM | Danny Martinez | 13,990 | |
| PPM | Arnulfo Flores | 749 | |
| Total votes | | | |

Kiamba vice mayoralty election
| Party | Candidate | Votes | % |
|---|---|---|---|
| PCM | Marie Jess Ancheta | 16,276 | |
| PFP | Cano Awayan | 7,761 | |
| PPM | Alfonso Lim | 2,034 | |
| Total votes | | | |

==== Maasim ====
Maasim mayoralty election
| Party | Candidate | Votes | % |
|---|---|---|---|
| PCM | Zyrex Pacquiao | 24,135 | |
| PFP | Arturo Lawa | 6,769 | |
| Independent | Mark Ace Mudi | 235 | |
| Total votes | | | |

Maasim vice mayoralty election
| Party | Candidate | Votes | % |
|---|---|---|---|
| PCM | Visitation Nambatac | 16,280 | |
| PFP | Uttoh Salem Cutan | 14,299 | |
| Independent | Mark Sinsuat | 218 | |
| Total votes | | | |

==== Maitum ====
Maitum mayoralty election
| Party | Candidate | Votes | % |
|---|---|---|---|
| PCM | Alexander Bryan Reganit | 14,596 | |
| PFP | Elsie Perrett | 8,569 | |
| Total votes | | | |

Maitum vice mayoralty election
| Party | Candidate | Votes | % |
|---|---|---|---|
| PCM | Tito Balazon | 14,877 | |
| PFP | Leodivico Ramos | 5,889 | |
| Total votes | | | |

=== 2nd District (East Coast) ===
- Municipalities: Alabel, Glan, Malapatan, Malungon

==== Alabel ====
Alabel mayoralty election
| Party | Candidate | Votes | % |
|---|---|---|---|
| PCM | Vic Paul Salarda | 34,590 | |
| Total votes | | | |

Alabel vice mayoralty election
| Party | Candidate | Votes | % |
|---|---|---|---|
| PCM | Lente Salway Jr. | 26,620 | |
| Independent | Ronnel Español | 14,932 | |
| Total votes | | | |

==== Glan ====
Glan mayoralty election
| Party | Candidate | Votes | % |
|---|---|---|---|
| PCM | Victor James Yap, Sr. | 23,586 | 44.49% |
| Lakas | Vivien Yap | 16,557 | 31.23% |
| Independent | Eugene Alzate | 11,269 | 21.26% |
| Reporma | Alano Abdulhalim | 1,236 | 2.33% |
| PFP | Butch Ruiz Baliao | 368 | 0.69% |
| Total votes | | 53,016 | 100.00 |

Glan vice mayoralty election
| Party | Candidate | Votes | % |
|---|---|---|---|
| PCM | Victor James Yap, Jr. | 17,746 | 34.46% |
| Lakas | Enrique Yap, Jr. | 16,732 | 32.49% |
| Independent | Antonio Deleña | 8,753 | 17% |
| PRP | Cyril Yap | 7,671 | 14.9% |
| Reporma | Ronnie Recto | 590 | 1.15% |
| Total votes | | 51,492 | 100.00 |

==== Malapatan ====
Malapatan mayoralty election
| Party | Candidate | Votes | % |
|---|---|---|---|
| PCM | Salway Sumbo Jr. | 23,321 | |
| Independent | Taba Harid | 7,574 | |
| Independent | Roel Cagape | 2,402 | |
| PPP | Boyang Cantabaco | 281 | |
| Total votes | | | |

Malapatan vice mayoralty election
| Party | Candidate | Votes | % |
|---|---|---|---|
| PCM | Jean Delos Santos | 15,023 | |
| Independent | Jimmy Bagit | 8,735 | |
| Independent | Sherry-Lou Vallinas | 4,557 | |
| Aksyon | Nor Anie Singcoy | 3,026 | |
| Total votes | | | |

==== Malungon ====
Malungon mayoralty election
| Party | Candidate | Votes | % |
|---|---|---|---|
| PCM | Tessa Constantino | 42,039 | |
| Total votes | | | |

Malungon vice mayoralty election
| Party | Candidate | Votes | % |
|---|---|---|---|
| PCM | Jun Escalada | 38,269 | |
| Total votes | | | |
