= 2019 Philippine local elections =

Local elections in Philippines

- May 13, 2019

All local elected offices above the barangay level
	First party	Second party	Third party
Party	PDP–Laban	Nacionalista	NUP
Governors	41 / 81	8 / 81	8 / 81
Vice governors	32 / 81	11 / 81	10 / 81
Board members	263 / 1,023	116 / 1,023	67 / 1,023
Mayors	611 / 1,634	252 / 1,634	125 / 1,634
Vice mayors	547 / 1,634	244 / 1,634	151 / 1,634
Councilors	4,183 / 16,812	2,009 / 16,812	990 / 16,812
	Fourth party	Fifth party	Sixth party
Party	NPC	Liberal	Lakas
Governors	7 / 81	2 / 81	2 / 81
Vice governors	6 / 81	5 / 81	2 / 81
Board members	90 / 1,023	54 / 1,023	18 / 1,023
Mayors	172 / 1,634	47 / 1,634	67 / 1,634
Vice mayors	184 / 1,634	62 / 1,634	66 / 1,634
Councilors	1,413 / 16,812	385 / 16,812	514 / 16,812
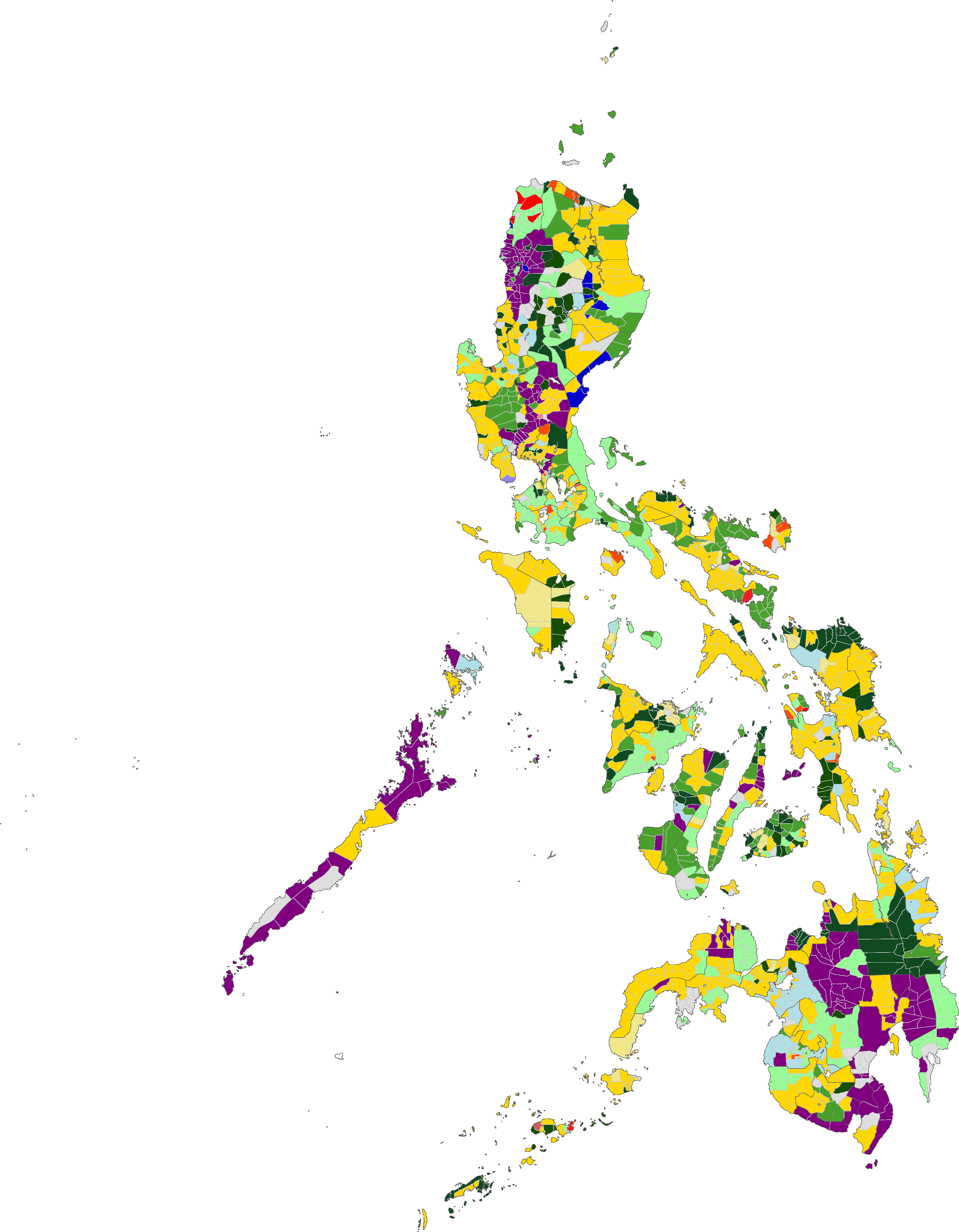
- Mayoral election results
President of the Union of Local Authorities of the Philippines before election
Albay Governor
Francis Bichara
PDP–Laban
Elected President of the Union of Local Authorities of the Philippines
Quirino Governor
Dakila Cua
PDP–Laban

Local elections in the Philippines were held on May 13, 2019. This was conducted together with the 2019 general election for national positions. All elected positions above the barangay (village) level were disputed. The following positions were disputed:

- 81 provincial governorships and vice-governorships
- 780 Provincial Board (Sangguniang Panlalawigan) members
- 1,634 mayorships and vice mayorships
- 13,544 city and municipal councilors (Sangguniang Panlungsod and Sangguniang Bayan)

The elective positions in the Bangsamoro Autonomous Region in Muslim Mindanao (BARMM) were not decided on this day. The first elections for BARMM will be done after the 2020 Philippine census is published.

The elective positions in the barangays were also not decided on this day. These were supposed to be held in October 2016, but were postponed to October 2017, then again to May 2018.

== Electoral system ==
Every local government unit, be it a province, city, municipality or a barangay elects a chief executive (a governor, city mayor, municipal mayor and barangay chairman, respectively), and a local legislature (the Sangguniang Panlalawigan, Sangguniang Panlungsod, Sangguniang Bayan and Sangguniang Barangay, respectively), president upon by the chief executive's deputy (vice-governor, city vice-mayor, and municipal vice-mayor, respectively; no equivalent for the barangay where the barangay chairman presides the Sangguniang Barangay).

=== Chief executive ===
Provincial governors and vice governors in each of the 81 provinces, and mayor and vice mayor in each of the 145 cities and 1,489 municipalities are elected via the first-past-the-post system.

=== Legislatures ===
For the membership in local legislatures the elections are done via plurality-at-large voting. For Sangguniang Panlalawigan seats, the Commission on Elections divides all provinces into at least 2 districts, if it is not divided into such, while for Sangguniang Panlungsod seats, the appropriation depends on the city charter (some are divided into districts, while others elect all councilors at-large), and for Sangguniang Bayan seats, all municipalities have eight councilors elected at-large, except for Pateros, which elects twelve, six in each district.

Winners in this election will have their terms start on June 30, 2019, and end on June 30, 2022.

==== Ex officio and reserved seats ====
The city or municipal presidents of the Liga ng mga Barangay (ABC, for its old name Association of Barangay Captains) and Sangguniang Kabataan (SK; youth councils) sit as ex officio members of the Sangguniang Bayan or Sangguniang Panlungsod of which its barangay is a part of.

For the Sangguniang Panlalawigan, the provincial presidents of the ABC and SK, along with the provincial presidents of the Philippine Councilors League (PCL) sit as its ex officio members.

Some legislatures have a reserved seat for indigenous people, called the "indigenous people mandatory representation (IPMR)". These are not indicated in the national totals.

When the legislatures elected in 2019 first convened, the ABC and SK presidents elected in 2018 were still serving, and will serve until January 1, 2023. Barangay elections are nonpartisan.

People selected as IPMR serve for three years. These selections are done by the indigenous people themselves under the supervision of the National Commission on Indigenous People. The terms are not usually aligned with local or barangay elections.

Ex officio members and IPMR are accorded full voting rights and privileges accorded to regularly elected members of each legislature.

== Participating parties ==
=== National parties ===
Party	President or leader	Chairman
Akbayan	Machris Cabreros	Risa Hontiveros
Aksyon	Sonia Roco	Herminio Aquino
CDP	Rufus Rodriguez	Lito Monico Lorenzana
KBL	Jose Vicente Opinion	
Lakas	Martin Romualdez	Bong Revilla
LDP	Bellaflor Angara-Castillo	Sonny Angara
Liberal	Francis Pangilinan	Leni Robredo
Nacionalista	Manuel Villar	Cynthia Villar
NPC	Giorgidi Aggabao	Faustino Dy Jr.
NUP	Elpidio Barzaga	Ronaldo Puno
PDDS	Greco Belgica	Eduardo Bringas
PDP–Laban	Koko Pimentel	Rodrigo Duterte
PFP	Jesus Hinlo	Abubakar Mangelen
PMP	Joseph Estrada	
PRP	Narciso Santiago	
UNA	Gregorio Honasan	Nancy Binay
WPP	Melchor Chavez	Jose Malvar Villegas

=== Local parties ===
Party	Local government unit
1CEBU	Cebu
AIM	Sarangani and General Santos
APP	Zamboanga del Norte, Zamboanga del Sur, Zamboanga Sibugay
AR	San Jose del Monte
Asenso Abrenio	Abra
Asenso	Manila
AZAP	Zamboanga City
BAKUD	Cebu and Cebu City
Bicol 1	Bicol Region
Bileg Ti Ilokano	Ilocos Sur
BPP	Bukidnon
KABAKA	Manila
Kambilan	Pampanga
Kusog Bicolandia	Bicol Region
Hugpong	Davao Region
Hugpong sa Tawong Lungsod	Davao City
MAKIMAZA	Zambales
Maguindanao Reform Party	Maguindanao
Padayon Pilipino	Misamis Oriental and Cagayan de Oro
PAK/ABE	Pampanga and Angeles City
PAZ	Zamboanga City
PCM	Sarangani and General Santos
PPPL	Palawan and Puerto Princesa
Serbisyo sa Bayan	Quezon City
Unang Sigaw	Nueva Ecija
UNEGA	Negros Occidental
Una ang Makati	Makati

In the presentation below, the order for legislatures is determined by the following:

- Ex officio seats, arranged by:
  - Liga ng mga Barangay member (nonpartisan)
  - Philippine Councilors League member (with corresponding color of his/her political party), for Sangguniang Panlalawigan elections.
  - Sangguniang Kabataan member (nonpartisan)
- Reserved seats
  - This can be either be none, for most provinces, one, for some provinces, or three, for Isabela and Tawi-Tawi.
- Election results
  - Parties by number of seats
    - If tied, by alphanumeric order
  - Independents

== Provincial elections ==
=== Gubernatorial elections ===
The following are the results of the gubernatorial elections by party:

Party	Seats
PDP–Laban	41
Nacionalista Party	8
National Unity Party	8
Nationalist People's Coalition	7
Hugpong ng Pagbabago	2
Lakas–CMD	2
Liberal Party	2
Asenso Abrenio	1
Bileg Party	1
Bukidnon Paglaum	1
Padayon Pilipino	1
Partido Federal ng Pilipinas	1
Pederalismo ng Dugong Dakilang Samahan	1
Unang Sigaw	1
United Nationalist Alliance	1
Independent	3
Total	81
Source: Commission on Elections

The following are the results of the gubernatorial elections by province:

Province	Elected governor	Party
Abra	Joy Bernos	Asenso Abrenio
Agusan del Norte	Dale Corvera	PDP–Laban
Agusan del Sur	Santiago Cane Jr.	NUP
Aklan	Florencio Miraflores	PDP–Laban
Albay	Al Francis Bichara	PDP–Laban
Antique	Rhodora Cadiao	NUP
Apayao	Eleanor Begtang	PDP–Laban
Aurora	Gerardo Noveras	NPC
Basilan	Hadjiman Hataman Salliman	PDP–Laban
Bataan	Albert Garcia	NUP
Batanes	Marilou Cayco	Liberal
Batangas	Hermilando Mandanas	PDP–Laban
Benguet	Melchor Diclas	PDP–Laban
Biliran	Rogelio Espina	Nacionalista
Bohol	Arthur C. Yap	PDP–Laban
Bukidnon	Jose Maria Zubiri Jr.	BPP
Bulacan	Daniel Fernando	NUP
Cagayan	Manuel Mamba	Independent
Camarines Norte	Edgar Tallado	PDP–Laban
Camarines Sur	Miguel Luis Villafuerte	PDP–Laban
Camiguin	Jurdin Jesus Romualdo	NPC
Capiz	Esteban Evan Contreras	Independent
Catanduanes	Joseph Cua	UNA
Cavite	Jonvic Remulla	Nacionalista
Cebu	Gwendolyn Garcia	PDP–Laban
Compostela Valley	Tyron Uy	HNP
Cotabato	Nancy Catamco	PDP–Laban
Davao del Norte	Edwin Jubahib	PDP–Laban
Davao del Sur	Douglas Cagas	Independent
Davao Occidental	Claude Bautista	HNP
Davao Oriental	Nelson Dayanghirang	Nacionalista
Dinagat Islands	Kaka Bag-ao	Liberal
Eastern Samar	Ben Evardone	PDP–Laban
Guimaras	Samuel Gumarin	PDP–Laban
Ifugao	Jerry Dalipog	NUP
Ilocos Norte	Matthew Manotoc	Nacionalista
Ilocos Sur	Ryan Luis Singson	Bileg
Iloilo	Arthur Defensor Jr.	PDP–Laban
Isabela	Rodolfo Albano III	PDP–Laban
Kalinga	Ferdinand Tubban	PDP–Laban
La Union	Francisco Ortega III	PDP–Laban
Laguna	Ramil Hernandez	PDP–Laban
Lanao del Norte	Imelda Dimaporo	PDP–Laban
Lanao del Sur	Mamintal Adiong Jr.	Lakas
Leyte	Leopoldo Petilla	PDP–Laban
Maguindanao	Mariam Mangudadatu	Nacionalista
Marinduque	Presbitero Velasco Jr.	PDP–Laban
Masbate	Antonio Kho	PDP–Laban
Misamis Occidental	Philip Tan	Nacionalista
Misamis Oriental	Yevgeny Emano	Padayon Pilipino
Mountain Province	Bonifacio Lacwasan	PDP–Laban
Negros Occidental	Bong Lacson	NPC
Negros Oriental	Roel Degamo	Nacionalista
Northern Samar	Edwin Ongchuan	NUP
Nueva Ecija	Aurelio Umali	Unang Sigaw
Nueva Vizcaya	Carlos Padilla	Nacionalista
Occidental Mindoro	Eduardo Gadiano	PDDS
Oriental Mindoro	Humerlito Dolor	PDP–Laban
Palawan	Jose Alvarez	PDP–Laban
Pampanga	Dennis Pineda	NPC
Pangasinan	Amado Espino III	PDP–Laban
Quezon	Danilo Suarez	Lakas
Quirino	Dakila Cua	PDP–Laban
Rizal	Rebecca Ynares	NPC
Romblon	Jose Riano	PDP–Laban
Samar	Milagrosa Tan	PDP–Laban
Sarangani	Steve Solon	PDP–Laban
Siquijor	Zaldy Villa	PDP–Laban
Sorsogon	Francis Escudero	NPC
South Cotabato	Reynaldo Tamayo Jr.	PFP
Southern Leyte	Damian Mercado	PDP–Laban
Sultan Kudarat	Pax Mangudadatu	NUP
Sulu	Abdusakur Mahail Tan	PDP–Laban
Surigao del Norte	Francisco Matugas	PDP–Laban
Surigao del Sur	Alexander Pimentel	PDP–Laban
Tarlac	Susan Yap	NPC
Tawi-Tawi	Yshmael Sali	NUP
Zambales	Jun Ebdane	PDP–Laban
Zamboanga del Norte	Roberto Uy	PDP–Laban
Zamboanga del Sur	Victor Yu	PDP–Laban
Zamboanga Sibugay	Wilter Palma	PDP–Laban

=== Vice gubernatorial elections ===
The following are the results of the vice gubernatorial elections by party:

Party	Seats
PDP–Laban	32
Nacionalista Party	11
National Unity Party	10
Nationalist People's Coalition	6
Liberal Party	5
United Nationalist Alliance	3
Hugpong ng Pagbabago	2
Lakas–CMD	2
Partido Federal ng Pilipinas	2
Asenso Abrenio	1
Bileg Party	1
Bukidnon Paglaum	1
Kambilan	1
Partidong Pagbabago ng Palawan	1
People's Champ Movement	1
Unang Sigaw	1
Total	80
Source: Commission on Elections

The following are the results of the vice gubernatorial elections by province:

Province	Elected vice governor	Party
Abra	Ronald Balao-as	Asenso Abrenio
Agusan del Norte	Ramon Bungabong	PDP–Laban
Agusan del Sur	Samuel Tortor	NUP
Aklan	Reynaldo Quimpo	Nacionalista
Albay	Edcel Greco Lagman	PDP–Laban
Antique	Edgar Denosta	NPC
Apayao	Remy Albano	Liberal
Aurora	Christian Noveras	PDP–Laban
Basilan	Yusop Alano	PDP–Laban
Bataan	Cris Garcia	NUP
Batanes	Ignacio Villa	Liberal
Batangas	Mark Leviste	PDP–Laban
Benguet	Johnny Waguis	PDP–Laban
Biliran	Brigido Caneja III	Nacionalista
Bohol	Rene Relampagos	NUP
Bukidnon	Rogelio Quiño	BPP
Bulacan	Wilhelmino Sy-Alvarado	NUP
Cagayan	Melvin Vargas Jr.	UNA
Camarines Norte	None (Note: Jonah Pimentel (PDP–Laban) received the most number of votes in the election, but had his certificate of candidacy cancelled and his proclamation as vice governor-elect suspended for being term-limited. Joseph Panotes (PDP–Laban), the top ranking provincial board member-elect, took office as vice governor.)	
Camarines Sur	Imelda Papin	PDP–Laban
Camiguin	Rodin Romualdo	PDP–Laban
Capiz	Jaime Magbanua	NUP
Catanduanes	Shirley Abundo	PFP
Cavite	Jolo Revilla	NPC
Cebu	Hilario Davide III	Liberal
Compostela Valley	Maria Carmen Zamora	HNP
Cotabato	Emmylou Mendoza	Nacionalista
Davao del Norte	Rey Uy	PDP–Laban
Davao del Sur	Marc Douglas Cagas IV	Nacionalista
Davao Occidental	Franklin Bautista	HNP
Davao Oriental	Niño Sotero Uy Jr.	Nacionalista
Dinagat Islands	Nilo Demerey Jr.	PDP–Laban
Eastern Samar	Maria Caridad Goteesan	PDP–Laban
Guimaras	John Edward Gando	PDP–Laban
Ifugao	Glenn Prudenciano	Liberal
Ilocos Norte	Cecilia Marcos	Nacionalista
Ilocos Sur	Jerry Singson	Bileg
Iloilo	Christine Garin	Nacionalista
Isabela	Bojie Dy	PDP–Laban
Kalinga	Dave Odiem	Nacionalista
La Union	Mario Eduardo Ortega	NUP
Laguna	Katherine Agapay	PDP–Laban
Lanao del Norte	Maria Cristina Atay	PDP–Laban
Lanao del Sur	Mohammad Khalid Adiong	Lakas
Leyte	Carlo Loreto	PDP–Laban
Maguindanao	Lester Sinsuat	PDP–Laban
Marinduque	Romulo Bacorro	PDP–Laban
Masbate	Olga Kho	PDP–Laban
Misamis Occidental	Aurora Virginia Almonte	Nacionalista
Misamis Oriental	Jigjag Pelaez	UNA
Mountain Province	Francis Tauli	PDP–Laban
Negros Occidental	Jeffrey Ferrer	NUP
Negros Oriental	Edward Mark Macias	Liberal
Northern Samar	Gary Lavin	NUP
Nueva Ecija	Emmanuel Antonio Umali	Unang Sigaw
Nueva Vizcaya	Jose Tomas Sr.	NUP
Occidental Mindoro	Peter Alfaro	PDP–Laban
Oriental Mindoro	Antonio Perez Jr.	PDP–Laban
Palawan	Victorino Dennis Socrates	PPPL
Pampanga	Lilia Pineda	Kambilan
Pangasinan	Mark Ronald Lambino	NPC
Quezon	Samuel Nantes	Nacionalista
Quirino	Julius Caesar Vaquilar	PDP–Laban
Rizal	Reynaldo San Juan Jr.	PFP
Romblon	Felix Ylagan	Lakas
Samar	Reynolds Michael Tan	PDP–Laban
Sarangani	Elmer de Peralta	PCM
Siquijor	Mei Ling Quezon	NPC
Sorsogon	Wowo Fortes	NPC
South Cotabato	Vicente de Jesus	PDP–Laban
Southern Leyte	Christopherson Yap	PDP–Laban
Sultan Kudarat	Ramon Abalos	PDP–Laban
Sulu	Abdusakur Tan II	PDP–Laban
Surigao del Norte	Eddie Gokiangkee Jr.	PDP–Laban
Surigao del Sur	Librado Navarro	PDP–Laban
Tarlac	Carlito David	NPC
Tawi-Tawi	Michail Ahaja	NUP
Zambales	Jay Khonghun	PDP–Laban
Zamboanga del Norte	Senen Angeles	PDP–Laban
Zamboanga del Sur	Roseller Ariosa	UNA
Zamboanga Sibugay	Rey Andre Olegario	Nacionalista

=== Provincial board elections ===
The following are the results of the gubernatorial elections by party:

Party	Seats
PDP–Laban	263
Nacionalista Party	116
Nationalist People's Coalition	90
National Unity Party	67
Liberal Party	54
Hugpong ng Pagbabago	24
Lakas–CMD	18
Partido Federal ng Pilipinas	18
Bileg Party	10
People's Champ Movement	10
Bukidnon Paglaum	9
United Nationalist Alliance	9
Asenso Abrenio	8
Partidong Pagbabago ng Palawan	7
Kambilan	6
Unang Sigaw	6
Padayon Pilipino	5
Laban ng Demokratikong Pilipino	4
Aggrupation of Parties for Prosperity	3
United Negros Alliance	3
Akbayan	1
Barug Alang sa Kauswagan ug Demokrasya	1
Bicol 1	1
Kilusang Bagong Lipunan	1
Maguindanao Reform Party	1
One Cebu	1
Pederalismo ng Dugong Dakilang Samahan	1
Independent	43
Total	780
Source: Commission on Elections

Ex-officio and sectoral seats are not included in the totals.

The following are the results of the provincial board elections by province:

Province	Elected seats	Party control (Note: Party control is calculated here by including the three seats for the provincial presidents of the Liga ng mga Barangay, the Sangguniang Kabataan and the Philippine Councilors League and excluding any Indigenous Peoples Mandatory Representative or sectoral seat. The provincial president of the Philippine Councilors League is considered here as non-partisan despite being elected as a city or municipal councilor under a political party.)	Composition
Abra	8	Asenso Abrenio	▌ Asenso Abrenio (8)
Agusan del Norte	8	PDP–Laban	▌ PDP–Laban (8)
Agusan del Sur	10	NUP	▌ NUP (10)
Aklan	10	PDP–Laban	▌ PDP–Laban (7); ▌ NPC (2); ▌ Nacionalista (1)
Albay	10	No majority	▌ PDP–Laban (5); ▌ Liberal (3); ▌ UNA (1); ▌ Independent (1)
Antique	10	No majority	▌ NPC (4); ▌ NUP (4); ▌ Independent (2)
Apayao	8	No majority	▌ NPC (4); ▌ PDP–Laban (3); ▌ Liberal (1)
Aurora	8	No majority	▌ LDP (4); ▌ NPC (3); ▌ Nacionalista (1)
Basilan	11	PDP–Laban	▌ PDP–Laban (7); ▌ Liberal (1)
Bataan	10	NUP	▌ NUP (8); ▌ Nacionalista (1); ▌ PDP–Laban (1)
Batanes	6	No majority	▌ Liberal (3); ▌ NPC (3)
Batangas	12	Nacionalista	▌ Nacionalista (12)
Benguet	10	PDP–Laban	▌ PDP–Laban (7); ▌ Lakas (2); ▌ NPC (1)
Biliran	8	No majority	▌ Nacionalista (5); ▌ PDP–Laban (3)
Bohol	10	No majority	▌ NPC (4); ▌ Liberal (2); ▌ PDP–Laban (2); ▌ NUP (1); ▌ Independent (1)
Bukidnon	10	BPP	▌ BPP (9); ▌ Independent (1)
Bulacan	10	NUP	▌ NUP (8); ▌ PDP–Laban (2)
Cagayan	10	No majority	▌ PDP–Laban (5); ▌ NUP (4); ▌ Independent (1)
Camarines Norte	10	PDP–Laban	▌ PDP–Laban (7); ▌ NUP (3)
Camarines Sur	10	No majority	▌ Nacionalista (5); ▌ NPC (4); ▌ Bicol 1 (1)
Camiguin	6	PDP–Laban	▌ PDP–Laban (6)
Capiz	10	Liberal	▌ Liberal (8); ▌ NUP (2)
Catanduanes	8	No majority	▌ NPC (3); ▌ UNA (2); ▌ PDP–Laban (1); ▌ PFP (1); ▌ Independent (1)
Cavite	16	No majority	▌ Nacionalista (5); ▌ NUP (4); ▌ PDP–Laban (3); ▌ Liberal (2); ▌ NPC (1); ▌ Independent (1)
Cebu	14	No majority	▌ PDP–Laban (4); ▌ NPC (3); ▌ Nacionalista (2); ▌ Bakud (1); ▌ Liberal (1); ▌ NUP (1); ▌ One Cebu (1); ▌ Independent (1)
Compostela Valley	10	HNP	▌ HNP (10)
Cotabato	10	Nacionalista	▌ Nacionalista (7); ▌ PDP–Laban (3)
Davao del Norte	10	PDP–Laban	▌ PDP–Laban (7); ▌ HNP (3)
Davao del Sur	10	No majority	▌ HNP (4); ▌ Nacionalista (3); ▌ Independent (3)
Davao Occidental	8	HNP	▌ HNP (7); ▌ Independent (1)
Davao Oriental	10	Nacionalista	▌ Nacionalista (9); ▌ PFP (1)
Dinagat Islands	8	No majority	▌ PDP–Laban (4); ▌ Akbayan (1); ▌ Liberal (1); ▌ Independent (2)
Eastern Samar	10	PDP–Laban	▌ PDP–Laban (8); ▌ Nacionalista (2)
Guimaras	8	PDP–Laban	▌ PDP–Laban (8)
Ifugao	8	No majority	▌ Liberal (1); ▌ PDP–Laban (1); ▌ Independent (6)
Ilocos Norte	10	Nacionalista	▌ Nacionalista (8); ▌ PDP–Laban (2)
Ilocos Sur	10	Bileg	▌ Bileg (10)
Iloilo	10	Nacionalista	▌ Nacionalista (7); ▌ PDP–Laban (1); ▌ UNA (1); ▌ Independent (1)
Isabela	12	No majority	▌ PDP–Laban (5); ▌ Nacionalista (3); ▌ NPC (2); ▌ PFP (2)
Kalinga	8	No majority	▌ Nacionalista (2); ▌ NPC (2); ▌ KBL (1); ▌ Lakas (1); ▌ Independent (2)
La Union	10	No majority	▌ NPC (4); ▌ PDP–Laban (4); ▌ Liberal (1); ▌ PFP (1)
Laguna	10	No majority	▌ Nacionalista (4); ▌ PDP–Laban (4); ▌ PFP (2)
Lanao del Norte	10	PDP–Laban	▌ PDP–Laban (9); ▌ Independent (1)
Lanao del Sur	10	Lakas	▌ Lakas (8); ▌ Nacionalista (1); ▌ Independent (1)
Leyte	10	No majority	▌ PDP–Laban (4); ▌ PFP (4); ▌ NPC (1); ▌ NUP (1)
Maguindanao	10	PDP–Laban	▌ PDP–Laban (7); ▌ Lakas (1); ▌ MRP (1); ▌ Nacionalista (1)
Marinduque	8	PDP–Laban	▌ PDP–Laban (6); ▌ UNA (1); ▌ Independent (1)
Masbate	10	No majority	▌ PDP–Laban (6); ▌ Liberal (1); ▌ NPC (1); ▌ NUP (1); ▌ Independent (1)
Misamis Occidental	10	Nacionalista	▌ Nacionalista (10)
Misamis Oriental	10	No majority	▌ Padayon Pilipino (5); ▌ PDP–Laban (3); ▌ NUP (1); ▌ UNA (1)
Mountain Province	8	No majority	▌ PDP–Laban (4); ▌ PFP (1); ▌ Independent (3)
Negros Occidental	12	No majority	▌ NPC (7); ▌ UNegA (1); ▌ NUP (1); ▌ PDP–Laban (1)
Negros Oriental	10	No majority	▌ NPC (4); ▌ Liberal (3); ▌ Nacionalista (2); ▌ Independent (1)
Northern Samar	10	No majority	▌ Liberal (4); ▌ NUP (4); ▌ Lakas (1); ▌ PDP–Laban (1)
Nueva Ecija	10	No majority	▌ Unang Sigaw (6); ▌ PDP–Laban (2); ▌ NUP (1); ▌ Independent (1)
Nueva Vizcaya	10	No majority	▌ Nacionalista (6); ▌ NUP (3); ▌ NPC (1)
Occidental Mindoro	10	Liberal	▌ Liberal (7); ▌ Nacionalista (1); ▌ PDDS (1); ▌ UNA (1)
Oriental Mindoro	10	No majority	▌ Liberal (4); ▌ PDP–Laban (4); ▌ PFP (2)
Palawan	10	PPPL	▌ PPPL (7); ▌ PDP–Laban (2); ▌ NUP (1)
Pampanga	10	No majority	▌ Kambilan (6); ▌ NPC (2); ▌ Liberal (1); ▌ PDP–Laban (1)
Pangasinan	12	PDP–Laban	▌ PDP–Laban (8); ▌ NPC (2); ▌ Lakas (1); ▌ Nacionalista (1)
Quezon	10	No majority	▌ Nacionalista (5); ▌ NPC (2); ▌ Lakas (1); ▌ PDP–Laban (1); ▌ Independent (1)
Quirino	8	PDP–Laban	▌ PDP–Laban (7); ▌ Independent (1)
Rizal	10	No majority	▌ NPC (6); ▌ Liberal (2); ▌ NUP (1); ▌ PFP (1)
Romblon	8	Nacionalista	▌ Nacionalista (6); ▌ Liberal (2)
Samar	10	No majority	▌ Liberal (5); ▌ PDP–Laban (4); ▌ UNA (1)
Sarangani	10	PCM	▌ PCM (10)
Siquijor	6	PDP–Laban	▌ PDP–Laban (5); ▌ Independent (1)
Sorsogon	10	NPC	▌ NPC (8); ▌ PDP–Laban (1); ▌ Independent (1)
South Cotabato	10	No majority	▌ NPC (5); ▌ PDP–Laban (4); ▌ PFP (1)
Southern Leyte	8	PDP–Laban	▌ PDP–Laban (7); ▌ Lakas (1)
Sultan Kudarat	10	PDP–Laban	▌ PDP–Laban (9); ▌ Independent (1)
Sulu	10	PDP–Laban	▌ PDP–Laban (7); ▌ Lakas (2); ▌ PFP (1)
Surigao del Norte	10	PDP–Laban	▌ PDP–Laban (9); ▌ Nacionalista (1)
Surigao del Sur	10	PDP–Laban	▌ PDP–Laban (9); ▌ NPC (1)
Tarlac	10	NPC	▌ NPC (9); ▌ Independent (1)
Tawi-Tawi	8	NUP	▌ NUP (7); ▌ PDP–Laban (1)
Zambales	10	PDP–Laban	▌ PDP–Laban (8); ▌ Liberal (1); ▌ PFP (1)
Zamboanga del Norte	10	PDP–Laban	▌ PDP–Laban (7); ▌ Nacionalista (2); ▌ NPC (1)
Zamboanga del Sur	10	PDP–Laban	▌ PDP–Laban (8); ▌ NUP (1); ▌ UNA (1)
Zamboanga Sibugay	10	No majority	▌ APP (3); ▌ Nacionalista (3); ▌ Independent (4)

== City and municipal elections ==
Local parties are denoted by purple (unless otherwise indicated), independents by light gray, and ex officio members of the legislatures are in dark gray.

- Summary of results, parties ranked by mayor's partyships won.
- Ex officio members are the representatives of the city or municipal chapters of the Liga ng mga Barangay and of the Sangguniang Kabataan (SK). These are determined from the nonpartisan 2018 barangay and SK elections. They first served on July 30, 2018, and will serve until January 1, 2022.
- Some councils have a reserved seat for indigenous people, called the "indigenous people mandatory representation (IPMR)". These are not indicated in the national totals.
- In some cities and municipalities, election slates consisting of candidates for mayor, vice mayor and councilors may include multiple parties.

Results summary
Party	Mayor		Vice mayor		Councilors	
Party	Total	+/−	Total	+/−	Seats	+/−
PDP–Laban	611 / 1,634	+41	547 / 1,634	+30	4,183 / 16,812	+257
Nacionalista	252 / 1,634	−1	244 / 1,634	+2	2,009 / 16,812	+52
NPC	172 / 1,634	−2	184 / 1,634	−4	1,413 / 16,812	−17
NUP	125 / 1,634	−1	151 / 1,634	+3	990 / 16,812	−2
Lakas	67 / 1,634	+2	66 / 1,634	0	514 / 16,812	+14
Liberal	47 / 1,634	−37	62 / 1,634	−34	385 / 16,812	−280
UNA	19 / 1,634	−2	20 / 1,634	−2	235 / 16,812	−38
LDP	11 / 1,634	0	9 / 1,634	0	91 / 16,812	+4
Aksyon	2 / 1,634	0	2 / 1,634	0	19 / 16,812	0
Other parties	259 / 1,634	+3	232 / 1,634	+9	1,971 / 16,812	+49
Independent	69 / 1,634	−2	117 / 1,634	−6	1,636 / 16,812	−22
Ex officio members	—N/a				3,268 / 16,812	0
Totals	1,634	0	1,634	0	16,812	+4

=== Highly urbanized and independent component cities ===
==== Mayoral elections ====
The following are the results of the mayoral elections in highly urbanized and independent component cities, including the independent municipality of Pateros:

City/Municipality	Elected mayor	Party
Angeles City	Carmelo Lazatin Jr.	PFP
Bacolod	Evelio Leonardia	NPC
Baguio	Benjamin Magalong	NPC
Butuan	Ronnie Vicente Lagnada	Nacionalista
Cagayan de Oro	Oscar Moreno	PDP–Laban
Caloocan	Oscar Malapitan	Nacionalista
Cebu City	Edgardo Labella	PDP–Laban
Cotabato City	Cynthia Guiani-Sayadi	NPC
Dagupan	Marc Brian Lim	Nacionalista
Davao City	Sara Duterte	HNP
General Santos	Ronnel Rivera	PCM
Iligan	Celso Regencia	PDP–Laban
Iloilo City	Jerry Treñas	NUP
Lapu-Lapu City	Junard Chan	PDP–Laban
Las Piñas	Imelda Aguilar	NPC
Lucena	Roderick Alcala	PDP–Laban
Makati	Abigail Binay	UNA
Malabon	Antolin Oreta III	Liberal
Mandaluyong	Carmelita Abalos	PDP–Laban
Mandaue	Jonas Cortes	PDP–Laban
Manila	Isko Moreno	Asenso Manileño
Marikina	Marcelino Teodoro	PDP–Laban
Muntinlupa	Jaime Fresnedi	Liberal
Naga	Nelson Legacion	Liberal
Navotas	Toby Tiangco	Navoteño
Olongapo	Rolen Paulino Jr.	Nacionalista
Ormoc	Richard Gomez	PDP–Laban
Parañaque	Edwin Olivarez	PDP–Laban
Pasay	Emi Rubiano	PDP–Laban
Pasig	Vico Sotto	Aksyon
Pateros	Ike Ponce	PDP–Laban
Puerto Princesa	Lucilo Bayron	PDP–Laban
Quezon City	Joy Belmonte	SBP
San Juan	Francis Zamora	PDP–Laban
Santiago	Joseph Tan	PDP–Laban
Taguig	Lino Cayetano	Nacionalista
Valenzuela	Rex Gatchalian	NPC
Zamboanga City	Beng Climaco	Liberal

==== Vice mayoral elections ====
The following are the results of the vice mayoral elections in highly urbanized and independent component cities, including the independent municipality of Pateros:

City/Municipality	Elected vice mayor	Party
Angeles City	Vicky Vega	PFP
Bacolod	El Cid Familiaran	Independent
Baguio	Faustino Olowan	PDP–Laban
Butuan	Jose Aquino II	Lakas
Cagayan de Oro	Raineir Joaquin Uy	PDP–Laban
Caloocan	Luis Macario Asistio	NPC
Cebu City	Mike Rama	UNA
Cotabato City	Graham Nazer Dumama	NPC
Dagupan	Dean Bryan Kua	Lakas
Davao City	Sebastian Duterte	HNP
General Santos	Loreto Acharon	AIM
Iligan	Jemar Vera Cruz	PDP–Laban
Iloilo City	Jeffrey Ganzon	Independent
Lapu-Lapu City	Celedonio Sitoy	PDP–Laban
Las Piñas	April Aguilar-Nery	NPC
Lucena	Philip Castillo	PDP–Laban
Makati	Monique Lagdameo	UNA
Malabon	Bernard dela Cruz	NUP
Mandaluyong	Antonio Suva Jr.	PDP–Laban
Mandaue	Glenn Bercede	PDP–Laban
Manila	Honey Lacuna	Asenso Manileño
Marikina	Marion Andres	NPC
Muntinlupa	Artemio Simundac	PDP–Laban
Naga	Cecilia de Asis	Liberal
Navotas	Clint Geronimo	Navoteño
Olongapo	Aquilino Cortez Jr.	Independent
Ormoc	Leo Carmelo Locsin Jr.	PDP–Laban
Parañaque	Jose Enrico Golez	NPC
Pasay	Noel del Rosario	PDP–Laban
Pasig	Iyo Bernardo	PDP–Laban
Pateros	Gerald German	PDP–Laban
Puerto Princesa	Nancy Socrates	PDP–Laban
Quezon City	Gian Sotto	SBP
San Juan	Jose Warren Villa	PDP–Laban
Santiago	Alvin Abaya	PDP–Laban
Taguig	Ading Cruz	Nacionalista
Valenzuela	Lorie Natividad-Borja	NPC
Zamboanga City	Rommel Agan	UNA

==== City council elections ====
The following are the results of the city council elections in highly urbanized and independent component cities, including the independent municipality of Pateros:

HUC/ICC/Municipality	Elected seats	Party control (Note: Party control in a city or municipal council is calculated here by including the two seats for the city or municipal presidents of the Liga ng mga Barangay and the Sangguniang Kabataan and excluding any sectoral seat.)	Composition
Angeles City	10	PAK	▌ PAK (7); ▌ PFP (2); ▌ Kambilan (1)
Bacolod	12	No majority	▌ NPC (6); ▌ Nacionalista (2); ▌ Independent (4)
Baguio	12	No majority	▌ UNA (5); ▌ Liberal (3); ▌ PDP–Laban (2); ▌ Nacionalista (1); ▌ NUP (1)
Butuan	10	No majority	▌ Lakas (5); ▌ Nacionalista (5)
Cagayan de Oro	16	PDP–Laban	▌ PDP–Laban (14); ▌ CDP (1); ▌ Padayon Pilipino (1)
Caloocan	12	No majority	▌ PDP–Laban (5); ▌ Nacionalista (3); ▌ PFP (2); ▌ Aksyon (1); ▌ NPC (1)
Cebu City	16	No majority	▌ PDP–Laban (8); ▌ LDP (7); ▌ Nacionalista (1)
Cotabato City	10	NPC	▌ NPC (7); ▌ NUP (1); ▌ PDP–Laban (1); ▌ PFP (1)
Dagupan	10	Lakas	▌ Lakas (7); ▌ Nacionalista (3)
Davao City	24	HNP	▌ HNP (19); ▌ HTL (4); ▌ Independent (1)
General Santos	12	PCM	▌ PCM (8); ▌ AIM (3); ▌ Nacionalista (1)
Iligan	12	PDP–Laban	▌ PDP–Laban (8); ▌ Nacionalista (3); ▌ UNA (1)
Iloilo City	12	No majority	▌ NUP (7); ▌ Nacionalista (4); ▌ Independent (1)
Lapu-Lapu City	12	Lakas	▌ Lakas (10); ▌ PDP–Laban (2)
Las Piñas	12	NPC	▌ NPC (11); ▌ Nacionalista (1)
Lucena	10	No majority	▌ PDP–Laban (6); ▌ Liberal (2); ▌ UNA (2)
Makati	16	UNA	▌ UNA (12); ▌ UAM (4)
Malabon	12	No majority	▌ Liberal (3); ▌ Nacionalista (3); ▌ NPC (2); ▌ UNA (1); ▌ PMP (1)
Mandaluyong	12	PDP–Laban	▌ PDP–Laban (10); ▌ Aksyon (1); ▌ Independent (1)
Mandaue	10	PDP–Laban	▌ PDP–Laban (10)
Manila	36	No majority	▌ Asenso Manileño (16); ▌ PMP (11); ▌ NUP (4); ▌ Kabaka (1); ▌ Nacionalista (1); ▌ Independent (3)
Marikina	16	No majority	▌ PDP–Laban (5); ▌ Liberal (4); ▌ NPC (1); ▌ PMP (1); ▌ Independent (5)
Muntinlupa	16	No majority	▌ Liberal (7); ▌ PDP–Laban (6); ▌ NUP (3)
Naga	10	Liberal	▌ Liberal (9); ▌ Independent (1)
Navotas	12	Navoteño	▌ Navoteño (12)
Olongapo	10	Nacionalista	▌ Nacionalista (8); ▌ Aksyon (1); ▌ PFP (1)
Ormoc	10	PDP–Laban	▌ PDP–Laban (10)
Parañaque	16	PDP–Laban	▌ PDP–Laban (15); ▌ NPC (1)
Pasay	12	PDP–Laban	▌ PDP–Laban (11); ▌ Independent (1)
Pasig	12	Nacionalista	▌ Nacionalista (10); ▌ Independent (2)
Pateros	12	PDP–Laban	▌ PDP–Laban (9); ▌ Nacionalista (3)
Puerto Princesa	10	No majority	▌ PDP–Laban (4); ▌ NPC (2); ▌ PPPL (2); ▌ PDDS (1); ▌ UNA (1)
Quezon City	36	SBP	▌ SBP (33); ▌ Nacionalista (1); ▌ NUP (1); ▌ PDP–Laban (1)
San Juan	12	PMP	▌ PMP (9); ▌ PDP–Laban (3)
Santiago	10	PDP–Laban	▌ PDP–Laban (8); ▌ Liberal (1); ▌ Independent (1)
Taguig	16	Nacionalista	▌ Nacionalista (16)
Valenzuela	12	NPC	▌ NPC (11); ▌ PDP–Laban (1)
Zamboanga City	16	No majority	▌ LDP (3); ▌ Liberal (3); ▌ PDP–Laban (3); ▌ PAZ (2); ▌ UNA (2); ▌ AZAP (1); ▌ Lakas (1); ▌ PFP (1)

=== Component cities ===
The following is the summary of the election results in component cities:

Component city	Mayor's party	Vice mayor's party	City council		
Component city	Mayor's party	Vice mayor's party	Elected seats	Party control	Composition
Alaminos, Pangasinan	Nacionalista	Nacionalista	10	Nacionalista	▌ Nacionalista (9); ▌ PDP–Laban (1)
Antipolo, Rizal	NPC	NPC	16	No majority	▌ NUP (8); ▌ NPC (7); ▌ Liberal (1)
Bacoor, Cavite	PDP–Laban	Lakas	12	No majority	▌ PDP–Laban (6); ▌ Lakas (5); ▌ NPC (1)
Bago, Negros Occidental	NPC	NPC	10	No majority	▌ NPC (5); ▌ Liberal (1); ▌ NUP (1); ▌ PDP–Laban (1); ▌ Independent (2)
Bais, Negros Oriental	NPC	NPC	10	NPC	▌ NPC (10)
Balanga, Bataan	PDP–Laban	PDP–Laban	10	PDP–Laban	▌ PDP–Laban (10)
Batac, Ilocos Norte	Nacionalista	Nacionalista	10	No majority	▌ Nacionalista (6); ▌ Independent (4)
Batangas City, Batangas	Nacionalista	PDP–Laban	12	Nacionalista	▌ Nacionalista (11); ▌ Liberal (1)
Bayawan, Negros Oriental	NPC	NPC	10	NPC	▌ NPC (8); ▌ Independent (2)
Baybay, Leyte	PFP	PFP	10	PFP	▌ PFP (10)
Bayugan, Agusan del Sur	NUP	NUP	10	NUP	▌ NUP (10)
Biñan, Laguna	PDP–Laban	PDP–Laban	12	PDP–Laban	▌ PDP–Laban (10); ▌ Nacionalista (1); ▌ NPC (1)
Bislig, Surigao del Sur	NPC	PDP–Laban	10	PDP–Laban	▌ PDP–Laban (9); ▌ NPC (1)
Bogo, Cebu	NPC	NPC	10	NPC	▌ NPC (10)
Borongan, Eastern Samar	NUP	LDP	10	No majority	▌ NPC (4); ▌ LDP (3); ▌ Liberal (1); ▌ PDP–Laban (1); ▌ Independent (1)
Cabadbaran, Agusan del Norte	PDP–Laban	PDP–Laban	10	PDP–Laban	▌ PDP–Laban (10)
Cabanatuan, Nueva Ecija	PDP–Laban	PDP–Laban	10	PDP–Laban	▌ PDP–Laban (10)
Cabuyao, Laguna	PDP–Laban	PDP–Laban	10	No majority	▌ PDP–Laban (6); ▌ Nacionalista (4)
Cadiz, Negros Occidental	UNegA	UNegA	10	UNegA	▌ UNegA (8); ▌ Independent (2)
Calamba, Laguna	Nacionalista	Nacionalista	12	No majority	▌ Nacionalista (7); ▌ PDP–Laban (2); ▌ Independent (3)
Calapan, Oriental Mindoro	PDP–Laban	PDP–Laban	10	PDP–Laban	▌ PDP–Laban (8); ▌ Independent (2)
Calbayog, Samar	Lakas	Liberal	12	Liberal	▌ Liberal (10); ▌ PDP–Laban (2)
Candon, Ilocos Sur	Bileg	Bileg	10	Bileg	▌ Bileg (9); ▌ Independent (1)
Canlaon, Negros Oriental	PDP–Laban	Lakas	10	No majority	▌ Liberal (5); ▌ Lakas (3); ▌ PDP–Laban (2)
Carcar, Cebu	Nacionalista	Nacionalista	10	Nacionalista	▌ Nacionalista (9); ▌ NPC (1)
Catbalogan, Samar	PDP–Laban	PDP–Laban	10	PDP–Laban	▌ PDP–Laban (8); ▌ Lakas (1); ▌ Independent (1)
Cauayan, Isabela	LDP	PDP–Laban	10	No majority	▌ LDP (5); ▌ PDP–Laban (5)
Cavite City, Cavite	Nacionalista	Nacionalista	10	Nacionalista	▌ Nacionalista (7); ▌ NPC (3)
Danao, Cebu	Bakud	Bakud	10	Bakud	▌ Bakud (10)
Dapitan, Zamboanga del Norte	APP	Nacionalista	10	No majority	▌ Nacionalista (5); ▌ APP (4); ▌ PDP–Laban (1)
Dasmariñas, Cavite	NUP	PDP–Laban	12	NUP	▌ NUP (10); ▌ PDP–Laban (2)
Digos, Davao del Sur	Independent	Independent	10	No majority	▌ HNP (6); ▌ Nacionalista (1); ▌ Independent (3)
Dipolog, Zamboanga del Norte	PDP–Laban	PDP–Laban	10	PDP–Laban	▌ PDP–Laban (10)
Dumaguete, Negros Oriental	Liberal	Independent	10	No majority	▌ Liberal (6); ▌ NPC (3); ▌ Independent (1)
El Salvador, Misamis Oriental	NUP	Padayon Pilipino	10	NUP	▌ NUP (10)
Escalante, Negros Occidental	NPC	NPC	10	NPC	▌ NPC (10)
Gapan, Nueva Ecija	Unang Sigaw	Unang Sigaw	10	Unang Sigaw	▌ Unang Sigaw (10)
General Trias, Cavite	NUP	NUP	12	NUP	▌ NUP (12)
Gingoog, Misamis Oriental	PDP–Laban	PDP–Laban	10	Nacionalista	▌ Nacionalista (7); ▌ PDP–Laban (3)
Guihulngan, Negros Oriental	Nacionalista	Nacionalista	10	Nacionalista	▌ Nacionalista (9); ▌ Independent (1)
Himamaylan, Negros Occidental	UNegA	UNegA	10	UNegA	▌ UNegA (7); ▌ NPC (3)
Ilagan, Isabela	PDP–Laban	PDP–Laban	10	No majority	▌ Independent (10)
Imus, Cavite	Liberal	PDP–Laban	12	No majority	▌ PDP–Laban (7); ▌ Liberal (5)
Iriga, Camarines Sur	Liberal	PDP–Laban	10	Liberal	▌ Liberal (8); ▌ Nacionalista (2)
Isabela, Basilan	Liberal	PDP–Laban	10	No majority	▌ Liberal (5); ▌ PDP–Laban (4); ▌ PFP (1)
Kabankalan, Negros Occidental	NPC	NPC	10	NPC	▌ NPC (9); ▌ Independent (1)
Kidapawan, Cotabato	Nacionalista	Nacionalista	10	No majority	▌ Nacionalista (6); ▌ PDP–Laban (2); ▌ Independent (2)
Koronadal, South Cotabato	PDP–Laban	Lakas	10	No majority	▌ PFP (6); ▌ Lakas (2); ▌ Liberal (1); ▌ PDP–Laban (1)
La Carlota, Negros Occidental	NUP	Liberal	10	NUP	▌ NUP (7); ▌ PDP–Laban (1); ▌ UNegA (1); ▌ Independent (1)
Lamitan, Basilan	PDP–Laban	PDP–Laban	10	PDP–Laban	▌ PDP–Laban (9); ▌ Liberal (1)
Laoag, Ilocos Norte	Nacionalista	Nacionalista	10	No majority	▌ Nacionalista (5); ▌ PDP–Laban (2); ▌ Independent (3)
Legazpi, Albay	PDP–Laban	PDP–Laban	10	PDP–Laban	▌ PDP–Laban (7); ▌ Nacionalista (1); ▌ NPC (1); ▌ UNA (1)
Ligao, Albay	PDP–Laban	PDP–Laban	10	PDP–Laban	▌ PDP–Laban (8); ▌ Independent (2)
Lipa, Batangas	Nacionalista	Nacionalista	12	Nacionalista	▌ Nacionalista (8); ▌ NPC (4)
Maasin, Southern Leyte	PDP–Laban	PDP–Laban	10	PDP–Laban	▌ PDP–Laban (10)
Mabalacat, Pampanga	NPC	NPC	10	No majority	▌ Kambilan (5); ▌ PFP (3); ▌ Lakas (1); ▌ NPC (1)
Malaybalay, Bukidnon	Nacionalista	BPP	10	BPP	▌ BPP (8); ▌ PDP–Laban (2)
Malolos, Bulacan	PDP–Laban	PDP–Laban	10	No majority	▌ PDP–Laban (5); ▌ NUP (4); ▌ Independent (1)
Marawi, Lanao del Sur	PMP	PMP	10	No majority	▌ Lakas (4); ▌ PMP (4); ▌ Independent (2)
Masbate City, Masbate	PDP–Laban	PDP–Laban	10	PDP–Laban	▌ PDP–Laban (8); ▌ Independent (2)
Mati, Davao Oriental	Independent	UNA	10	Nacionalista	▌ Nacionalista (7); ▌ PDP–Laban (1); ▌ UNA (1); ▌ Independent (1)
Meycauayan, Bulacan	PDP–Laban	PDP–Laban	10	PDP–Laban	▌ PDP–Laban (8); ▌ Independent (2)
Muñoz, Nueva Ecija	PELA	Independent	10	No majority	▌ PELA (3); ▌ Independent (7)
Naga, Cebu	Nacionalista	Nacionalista	10	Nacionalista	▌ Nacionalista (10)
Oroquieta, Misamis Occidental	Nacionalista	Nacionalista	10	Nacionalista	▌ Nacionalista (9); ▌ NUP (1)
Ozamiz, Misamis Occidental	Nacionalista	Nacionalista	10	Nacionalista	▌ Nacionalista (10)
Pagadian, Zamboanga del Sur	PDP–Laban	NUP	10	No majority	▌ PDP–Laban (6); ▌ UNA (2); ▌ Nacionalista (1); ▌ NPC (1)
Palayan, Nueva Ecija	PDP–Laban	PDP–Laban	10	PDP–Laban	▌ PDP–Laban (8); ▌ Lakas (2)
Panabo, Davao del Norte	PDP–Laban	HNP	10	HNP	▌ HNP (8); ▌ PDP–Laban (2)
Passi, Iloilo	Nacionalista	Nacionalista	10	Nacionalista	▌ Nacionalista (8); ▌ Independent (2)
Roxas, Capiz	Liberal	Liberal	10	Liberal	▌ Liberal (7); ▌ Independent (3)
Sagay, Negros Occidental	NUP	NUP	10	No majority	▌ NUP (5); ▌ UNegA (5)
Samal, Davao del Norte	PDP–Laban	Independent	12	PDP–Laban	▌ PDP–Laban (8); ▌ HNP (1); ▌ Independent (3)
San Carlos, Negros Occidental	NPC	NPC	10	NPC	▌ NPC (10)
San Carlos, Pangasinan	PDP–Laban	PDP–Laban	10	PDP–Laban	▌ PDP–Laban (9); ▌ NPC (1)
San Fernando, La Union	Independent	PDP–Laban	12	No majority	▌ PDP–Laban (5); ▌ NPC (4); ▌ Independent (3)
San Fernando, Pampanga	Kambilan	Kambilan	10	Kambilan	▌ Kambilan (9); ▌ Independent (1)
San Jose, Nueva Ecija	PFP	Independent	10	No majority	▌ Unang Sigaw (3); ▌ PFP (2); ▌ UNA (2); ▌ NUP (1); ▌ Independent (2)
San Jose del Monte, Bulacan	AR	AR	12	No majority	▌ AR (7); ▌ NUP (2); ▌ PDP–Laban (1); ▌ PFP (1); ▌ Makabayan (1)
San Pablo, Laguna	Nacionalista	Nacionalista	10	Nacionalista	▌ Nacionalista (8); ▌ Lakas (1); ▌ Independent (1)
San Pedro, Laguna	Nacionalista	PDP–Laban	10	Nacionalista	▌ Nacionalista (8); ▌ PDP–Laban (2)
Santa Rosa, Laguna	PDP–Laban	NPC	10	PDP–Laban	▌ PDP–Laban (9); ▌ PFP (1)
Silay, Negros Occidental	PDP–Laban	PDP–Laban	10	No majority	▌ PDP–Laban (6); ▌ UNegA (4)
Sipalay, Negros Occidental	NPC	NPC	10	NPC	▌ NPC (7); ▌ UNegA (1); ▌ Independent (2)
Sorsogon City, Sorsogon	NPC	NPC	12	NPC	▌ NPC (9); ▌ UNA (2); ▌ Independent (1)
Surigao City, Surigao del Norte	PDP–Laban	PDP–Laban	10	PDP–Laban	▌ PDP–Laban (8); ▌ Nacionalista (2)
Tabaco, Albay	Liberal	Liberal	10	Liberal	▌ Liberal (8); ▌ KB (1); ▌ Independent (1)
Tabuk, Kalinga	Liberal	PDP–Laban	10	No majority	▌ Liberal (4); ▌ Nacionalista (3); ▌ Independent (3)
Tacurong, Sultan Kudarat	NPC	NPC	10	No majority	▌ NPC (4); ▌ Nacionalista (3); ▌ PDP–Laban (3)
Tagaytay, Cavite	PDP–Laban	PDP–Laban	10	PDP–Laban	▌ PDP–Laban (10)
Tagbilaran, Bohol	NUP	Liberal	10	NUP	▌ NUP (8); ▌ Liberal (1); ▌ NPC (1)
Tagum, Davao del Norte	PDP–Laban	PDP–Laban	10	PDP–Laban	▌ PDP–Laban (10)
Talisay, Cebu	Nacionalista	Nacionalista	10	Nacionalista	▌ Nacionalista (10)
Talisay, Negros Occidental	PDP–Laban	PDP–Laban	10	PDP–Laban	▌ PDP–Laban (10)
Tanauan, Batangas	UNA	UNA	10	No majority	▌ UNA (6); ▌ Nacionalista (3); ▌ Independent (1)
Tandag, Surigao del Sur	PDP–Laban	PDP–Laban	10	PDP–Laban	▌ PDP–Laban (10)
Tangub, Misamis Occidental	Nacionalista	Nacionalista	10	Nacionalista	▌ Nacionalista (10)
Tanjay, Negros Oriental	NPC	Liberal	10	No majority	▌ NPC (6); ▌ Liberal (2); ▌ Nacionalista (1); ▌ Independent (1)
Tarlac City, Tarlac	NPC	NPC	10	NPC	▌ NPC (9); ▌ Independent (1)
Tayabas, Quezon	Nacionalista	Independent	10	No majority	▌ NPC (4); ▌ Nacionalista (3); ▌ Independent (3)
Toledo, Cebu	Independent	Independent	10	No majority	▌ PDP–Laban (3); ▌ One Cebu (1); ▌ Independent (6)
Trece Martires, Cavite	Nacionalista	Nacionalista	10	Nacionalista	▌ Nacionalista (7); ▌ Aksyon (3)
Tuguegarao, Cagayan	NPC	NPC	12	No majority	▌ NPC (7); ▌ Liberal (2); ▌ NUP (2); ▌ Nacionalista (1)
Urdaneta, Pangasinan	Lakas	Lakas	10	No majority	▌ PDP–Laban (5); ▌ Lakas (4); ▌ Independent (1)
Valencia, Bukidnon	BPP	BPP	10	BPP	▌ BPP (9); ▌ Nacionalista (1)
Victorias, Negros Occidental	PDP–Laban	PDP–Laban	10	PDP–Laban	▌ PDP–Laban (8); ▌ Independent (2)
Vigan, Ilocos Sur	Nacionalista	Nacionalista	10	Nacionalista	▌ Nacionalista (9); ▌ Independent (1)
