= Governor of Sarangani =

Local chief executive

Provincial Governor of Sarangani
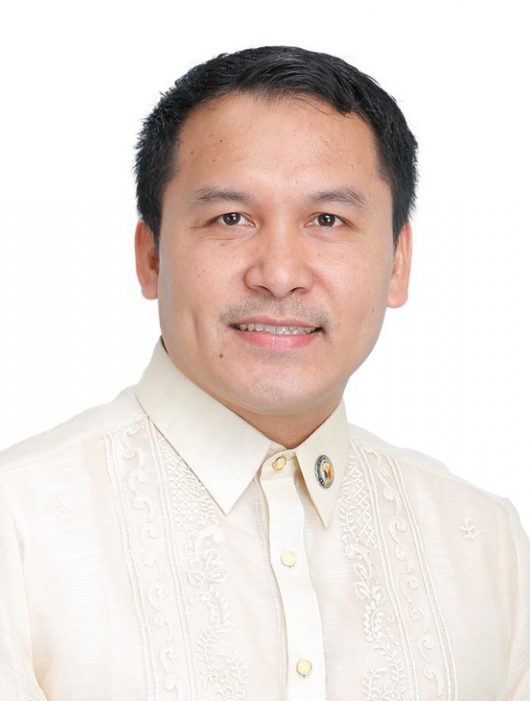
- Incumbent; Rogelio Pacquiao since June 30, 2022
- Appointer: Elected via popular vote
- Term length: 3 years
- Inaugural holder: Priscilla Chiongbian
- Formation: November 29, 1992

The governor of Sarangani (Filipino: Punong Panlalawigan ng Sarangani), is the chief executive of the provincial government of Sarangani.

== Provincial Governors (1992-present) ==
	Governor	Term
1	Priscilla L. Chiongbian	November 29, 1992-June 30, 2001
2	Miguel Escobar	June 30, 2001-June 30, 2004
3	Miguel Rene Dominguez	June 30, 2004-June 30, 2013
4	Steve C. Solon	June 30, 2013-June 30, 2022
5	Rogelio Pacquiao	June 30, 2022-present
