= Sarangani's at-large congressional district =

Legislative district of the Philippines

- Constituency for the House of Representatives of the Philippines
- Location of Sarangani within the Philippines
- Province: Sarangani
- Region: Soccsksargen
- Population: 558,946 (2020)
- Electorate: 373,178 (2025)
- Area: 3,601.25 km^{2} (1,390.45 sq mi)

Current constituency
- Created: 1992
- Representative: Steve Solon
- Political party: NUP; PCM
- Congressional bloc: Majority

Sarangani's at-large congressional district is the sole congressional district of the Philippines in the province of Sarangani. It was created ahead of the 1995 Philippine House of Representatives elections following the separation of the third district from South Cotabato in 1992. The province has been electing a single representative provincewide at-large to the House of Representatives from the 10th Congress onwards. It is currently represented in the 20th Congress by Steve Solon of the National Unity Party (NUP) and People's Champ Movement (PCM).

== Representation history ==
#	Image	Member	Term of office		Congress	Party	Electoral history
#	Image	Member	Start	End	Congress	Party	Electoral history
=== Sarangani's at-large district for the House of Representatives of the Philippines ===
District created March 16, 1992.
1		James Chiongbian	June 30, 1995	June 30, 1998	10th	Lakas	Redistricted from South Cotabato's 3rd district and re-elected in 1995.
2		Juan Domino	–	–	11th	Independent	Elected in 1998. Disqualified by Commission on Elections for lack of residency.
3		Erwin L. Chiongbian	June 30, 2001	June 30, 2010	12th	Lakas (SARRO)	Elected in 2001.
3		Erwin L. Chiongbian	June 30, 2001	June 30, 2010	13th	Lakas (SARRO)	Re-elected in 2004.
3		Erwin L. Chiongbian	June 30, 2001	June 30, 2010	14th	Lakas (SARRO)	Re-elected in 2007.
4		Manny Pacquiao	June 30, 2010	June 30, 2016	15th	Liberal (PCM)	Elected in 2010.
4		Manny Pacquiao	June 30, 2010	June 30, 2016	16th	UNA (PCM)	Re-elected in 2013.
5		Rogelio D. Pacquiao	June 30, 2016	June 30, 2022	17th	PDP–Laban (PCM)	Elected in 2016.
5		Rogelio D. Pacquiao	June 30, 2016	June 30, 2022	18th	PCM	Re-elected in 2019.
6		Steve C. Solon	June 30, 2022	Incumbent	19th	Lakas (PCM)	Elected in 2022.
6		Steve C. Solon	June 30, 2022	Incumbent	20th	NUP (PCM)	Re-elected in 2025.

== Election results ==
=== 2025 ===
Candidate	Party	Votes	%
Steve Solon (incumbent)	Lakas–CMD	187,041	80.42
Kingchopazar Belimac	Partido Demokratiko Pilipino	41,363	17.78
Butch Baliao	Independent	4,185	1.80
Total		232,589	100.00
Registered voters/turnout		373,178	–
Lakas–CMD hold			
Source: Commission on Elections

=== 2013 ===
2013 Philippine House of Representatives election at Sarangani
Party	Candidate	Votes	%
UNA	Manny Pacquiao	120,302	100.00
Total votes		120,302	100.00
UNA hold			

=== 2010 ===
Philippine House of Representatives election at Sarangani
Party	Candidate	Votes	%
PCM	Manny Pacquiao	120,052	66.35
SARRO	Roy Chiongbian	60,899	33.65
Valid ballots		180,591	97.57
Invalid or blank votes		4,499	2.43
Total votes		180,951	100.00
PCM gain from SARRO			

== See also ==
- Legislative districts of Sarangani
