= Malapatan =

Municipality in Sarangani, Philippines

- Municipality
- Municipality of Malapatan

Other transcription(s)
  - Jawi: ملڤاتن
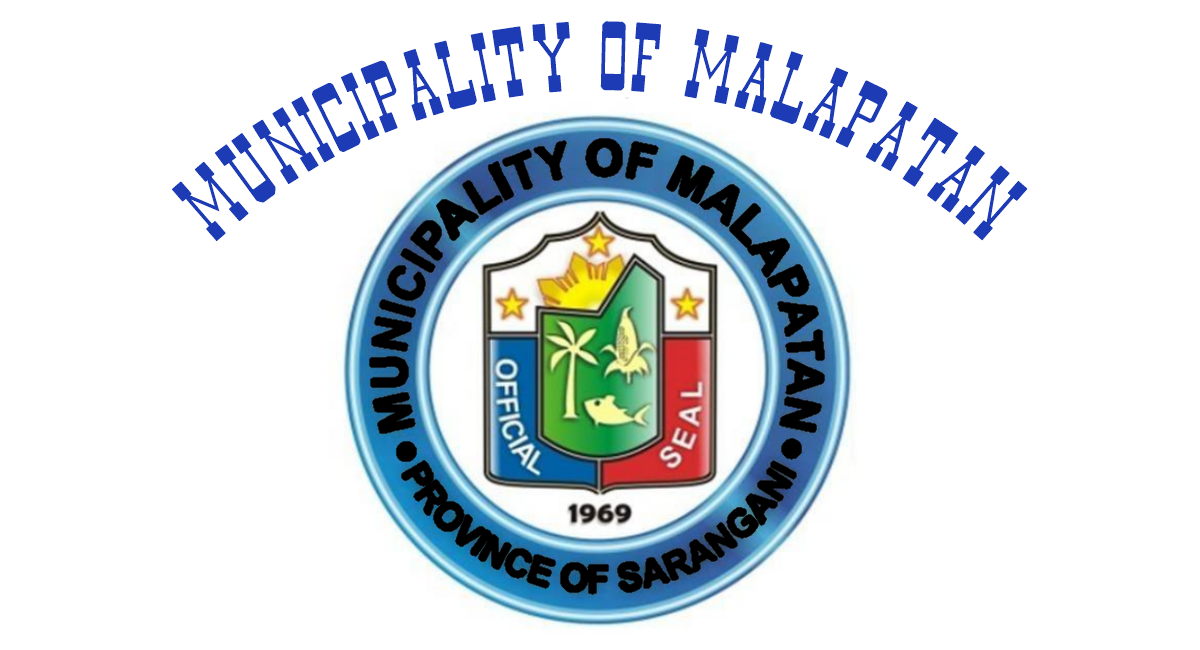
- Flag Seal

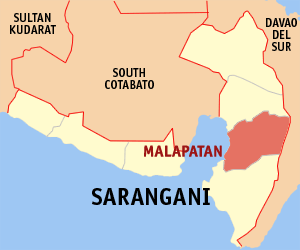
- Map of Sarangani with Malapatan highlighted
- Interactive map of Malapatan
- Location within the Philippines
- Coordinates: 5°58′14″N 125°17′18″E
- Country: Philippines
- Region: Soccsksargen
- Province: Sarangani
- District: Lone district
- Barangays: 12 (see Barangays)

Government
  - Type: Sangguniang Bayan
  - Mayor: Salway D. Sumbo Jr.
  - Vice Mayor: Jean D. Delos Santos
  - Representative: Steve Solon
  - Municipal Council: Members: Boyet S. Ogan; Danilo T. Abdulradzak; Eleanor S. Suib; Al-Omer P. Suib; Diana Jade V. Tatad-Sambaga; Ruben A. Sumbo Jr.; Norberto A. Butiong; Brandy R. Palarion
  - Electorate: 47,752 voters (2025)

Area
  - Total: 609.28 km^{2} (235.24 sq mi)
- Elevation: 97 m (318 ft)
- Highest elevation: 612 m (2,008 ft)
- Lowest elevation: 0 m (0 ft)

Population (2024 census)
  - Total: 82,577
  - Density: 135.53/km^{2} (351.03/sq mi)
  - Households: 18,604

Economy
  - Income class: 1st municipal income class
  - Poverty incidence: 35.87% (2023)
  - Revenue: ₱ 424.8 million (2024)
  - Assets: ₱ 1,237 million (2024)
  - Expenditure: ₱ 373.6 million (2024)
  - Liabilities: ₱ 499.1 million (2024)

Service provider
  - Electricity: South Cotabato 2 Electric Cooperative (SOCOTECO 2)
- Time zone: UTC+8 (PST)
- ZIP code: 9516
- PSGC: 1208006000
- IDD : area code: +63 (0)83
- Native languages: Cebuano; Tboli; Maguindanao; Blaan; Tagalog
- Website: www.malapatan.gov.ph

Malapatan, officially the Municipality of Malapatan (Note: Blaan: Banwé Malapatan Sinugboanon: Lungsod sa Malapatan Mëgindënëwn: Inged nu Malapatan Tboli: Benwu Malapatan Tagakolu: Lunsud na Malapatan Hiligaynon: Banwa sang Malapatan Ilokano: Ili ti Malapatan Filipino: Munisipalidad ng Malapatan), is a municipality in the province of Sarangani, Philippines. According to the 2024 census, it has a population of 82,577 people.

Malapatan is bounded on the west by Sarangani Bay, on the east by Davao Occidental, on the north by Alabel, and on the south by Glan.

== Geography ==
=== Barangays ===
Malapatan is politically subdivided into 12 barangays. Each barangay consists of puroks while some have sitios.

- Daan Suyan
- Kihan
- Kinam
- Libi
- Lun Masla
- Lun Padidu
- Patag
- Poblacion (Malapatan)
- Sapu Masla
- Sapu Padidu
- Tuyan
- Upper Suyan

=== Climate ===
Climate data for Malapatan, Sarangani
Month	Jan	Feb	Mar	Apr	May	Jun	Jul	Aug	Sep	Oct	Nov	Dec	Year
Mean daily maximum °C (°F)	31 (88)	31 (88)	31 (88)	32 (90)	30 (86)	29 (84)	29 (84)	29 (84)	30 (86)	30 (86)	30 (86)	30 (86)	30 (86)
Mean daily minimum °C (°F)	23 (73)	23 (73)	23 (73)	24 (75)	25 (77)	24 (75)	24 (75)	24 (75)	24 (75)	24 (75)	24 (75)	24 (75)	24 (75)
Average precipitation mm (inches)	129 (5.1)	106 (4.2)	148 (5.8)	180 (7.1)	261 (10.3)	316 (12.4)	295 (11.6)	274 (10.8)	220 (8.7)	238 (9.4)	243 (9.6)	181 (7.1)	2,591 (102.1)
Average rainy days	17.4	16.2	19.5	22.8	27.6	27.9	26.5	25.7	24.0	26.6	27.2	23.5	284.9
Source: Meteoblue

== Demographics ==
Population census of Malapatan
Year	Pop.	±% p.a.
1970	19,993	—
1975	20,224	+0.23%
1980	29,965	+8.18%
1990	36,255	+1.92%
1995	47,911	+5.36%
2000	53,876	+2.55%
2007	65,605	+2.75%
2010	72,386	+3.64%
2015	76,914	+1.16%
2020	80,741	+1.03%
2024	82,577	+0.54%
Source: Philippine Statistics Authority

Malapatan has residents who ascribe to a variety of religious beliefs including Christians, Muslims (mostly Maguindanaon, as well as the indigenous people of Sarangani). Malapatan is also the home of the famous Blaan "dreamweavers" who craft sleeping mats using the designs they have dreamt about.

== Economy ==
Poverty incidence of Malapatan (%)

Source: Philippine Statistics Authority

The economy of Malapatan is largely based on agriculture with a high level production of copra (dried coconut meat). Animal husbandry is the second biggest income earner, notably cattle farming. Other agricultural products are coconuts, maize, sugarcane, bananas, pineapples, mangoes, eggs, beef, fish.

The economy has accelerated in the past decade driven by advances in global communication technology and the finishing of a modern highway that tremendously improved trade and transport.
