= Rogelio Pacquiao =

Filipino politician (born 1982)

The Honorable Rogelio Pacquiao
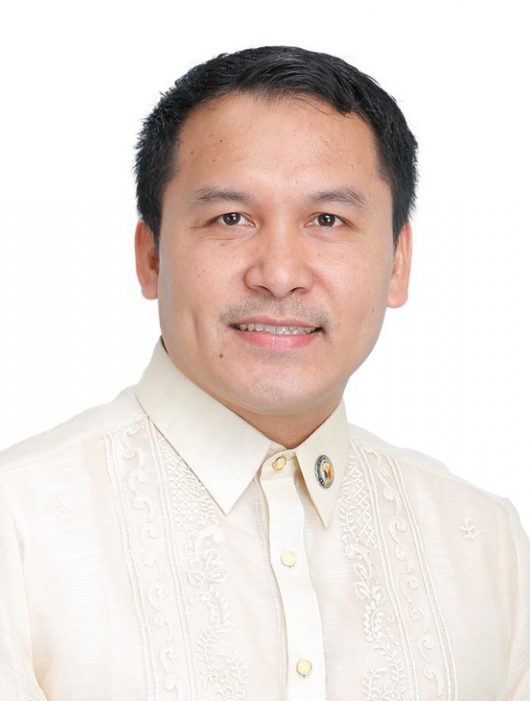
- Official portrait, c. 2022

Governor of Sarangani
- Incumbent
- Assumed office June 30, 2022
- Vice Governor: Elmer de Peralta (2022–2025); Danny Martinez (2025–present)
- Preceded by: Steve Solon

Member of the House of Representatives of the Philippines for Sarangani's at-large congressional district
- In office June 30, 2016 – June 30, 2022
- Preceded by: Manny Pacquiao
- Succeeded by: Steve C. Solon

Personal details
- Born: Rogelio Dapidran Pacquiao; June 17, 1982 (age 44)
- Party: PFP (2024–present); PCM (local party; 2015–present)
- Other political affiliations: PDP–Laban (2016–2021)
- Relatives: Manny Pacquiao (brother); Bobby Pacquiao (brother); Jinkee Pacquiao (sister-in-law)
- Occupation: Politician

Rogelio "Ruel" Dapidran Pacquiao (born June 17, 1982) is a Filipino politician who has served as Governor of Sarangani since 2022.

== Early life ==
Pacquiao is one of the six children born to Dionesia Dapidran-Pacquiao and Rosalio Pacquiao, alongside his brothers Manny and Bobby, who were also professional boxers before entering politics.

== Electoral history ==
Electoral history of Rogelio Pacquiao
Year	Office	Party		Votes received				Result
Year	Office	Local	National	Total	%	P.	Swing	Result
2016	Representative (Sarangani at-large)	PCM	—N/a	142,307	—N/a	1st	—N/a	Won
2019	Representative (Sarangani at-large)	PCM	PDP–Laban	182,491	—N/a	1st	—N/a	Won
2022	Governor of Sarangani	PCM	—N/a	166,249	73.42%	1st	—N/a	Won
2025	Governor of Sarangani	PCM	PFP	155,989	66.31%	1st	—N/a	Won

== See also ==
- List of current Philippine governors
