= Sarangani =

Province in Soccsksargen, Philippines

- Province

Other transcription(s)
  - Jawi: سرڠان
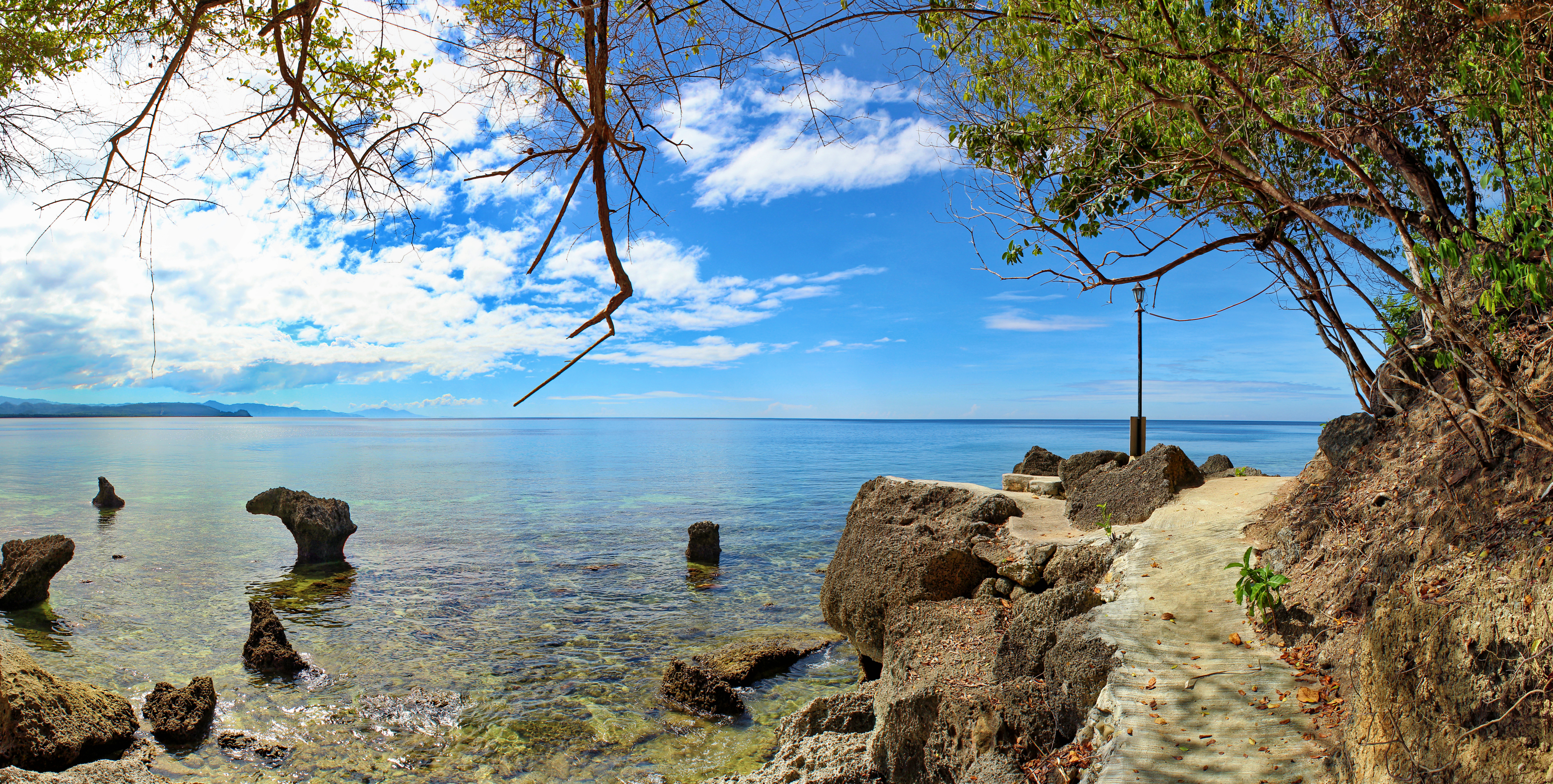
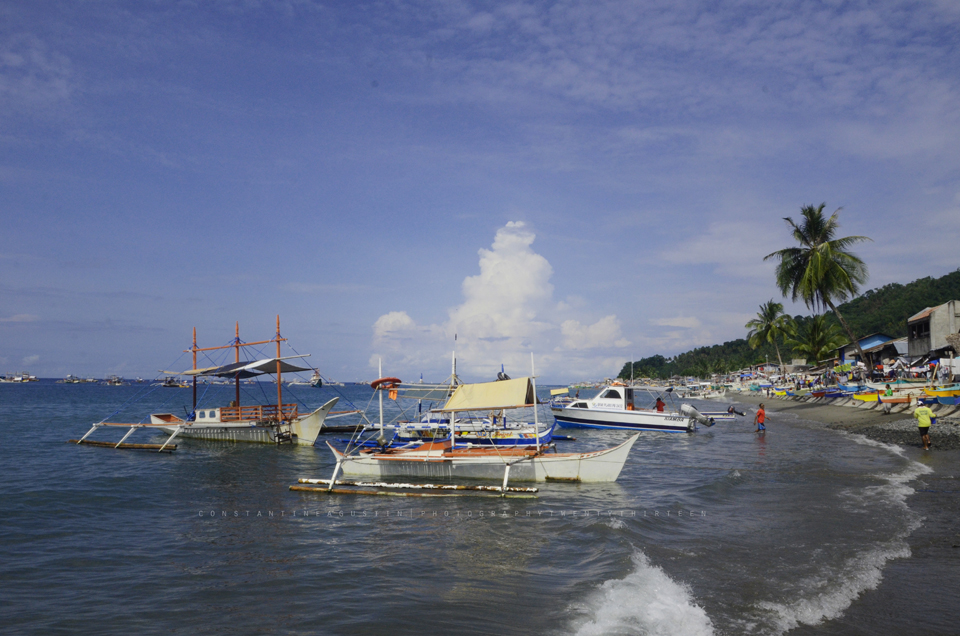
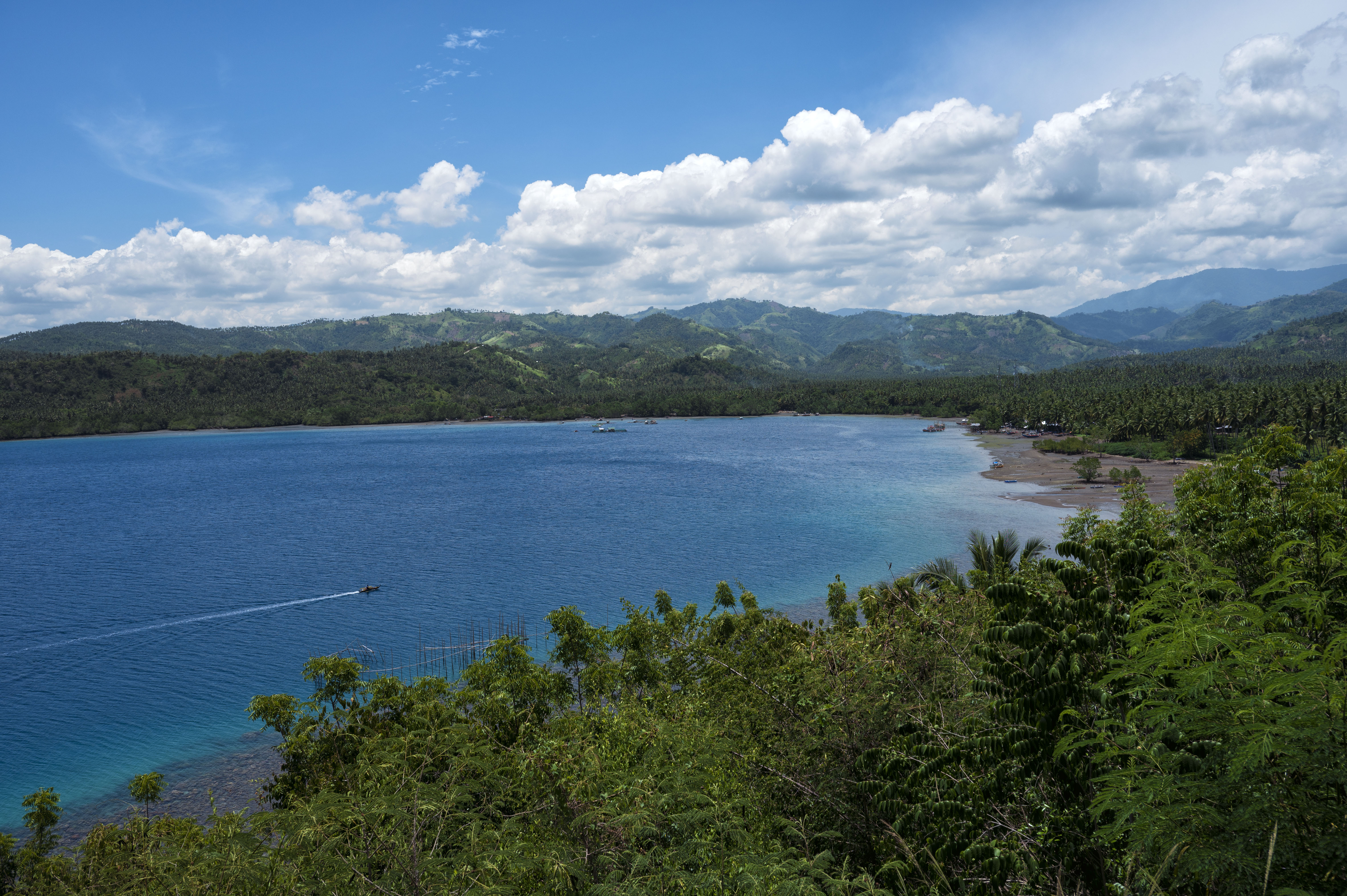
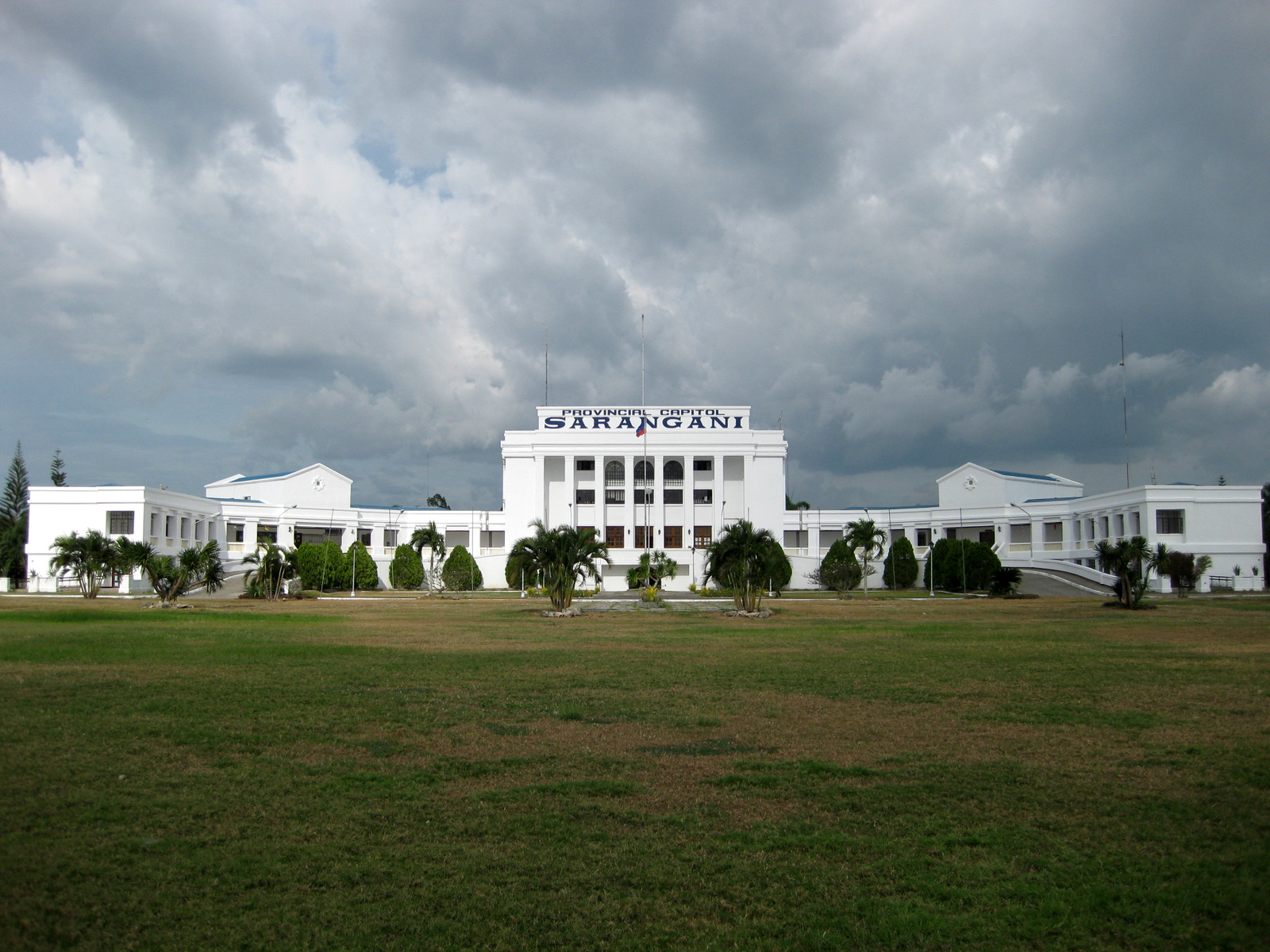
- (from top: left to right) Sarangani Bay, Kiamba Port, shoreline of Glan, Provincial Capitol

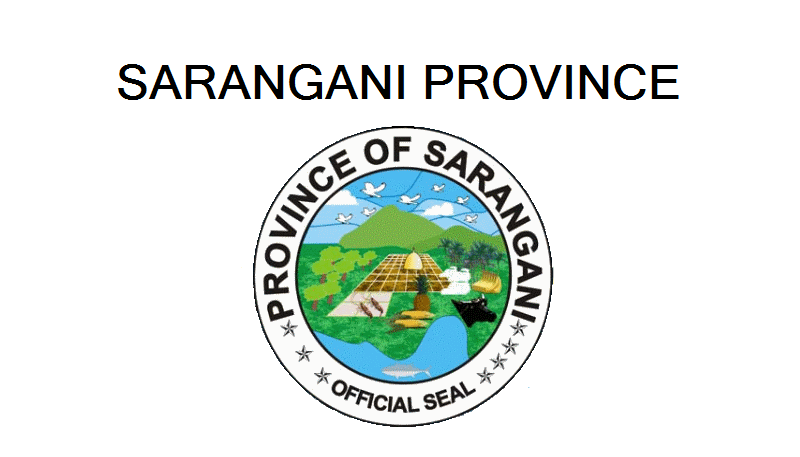
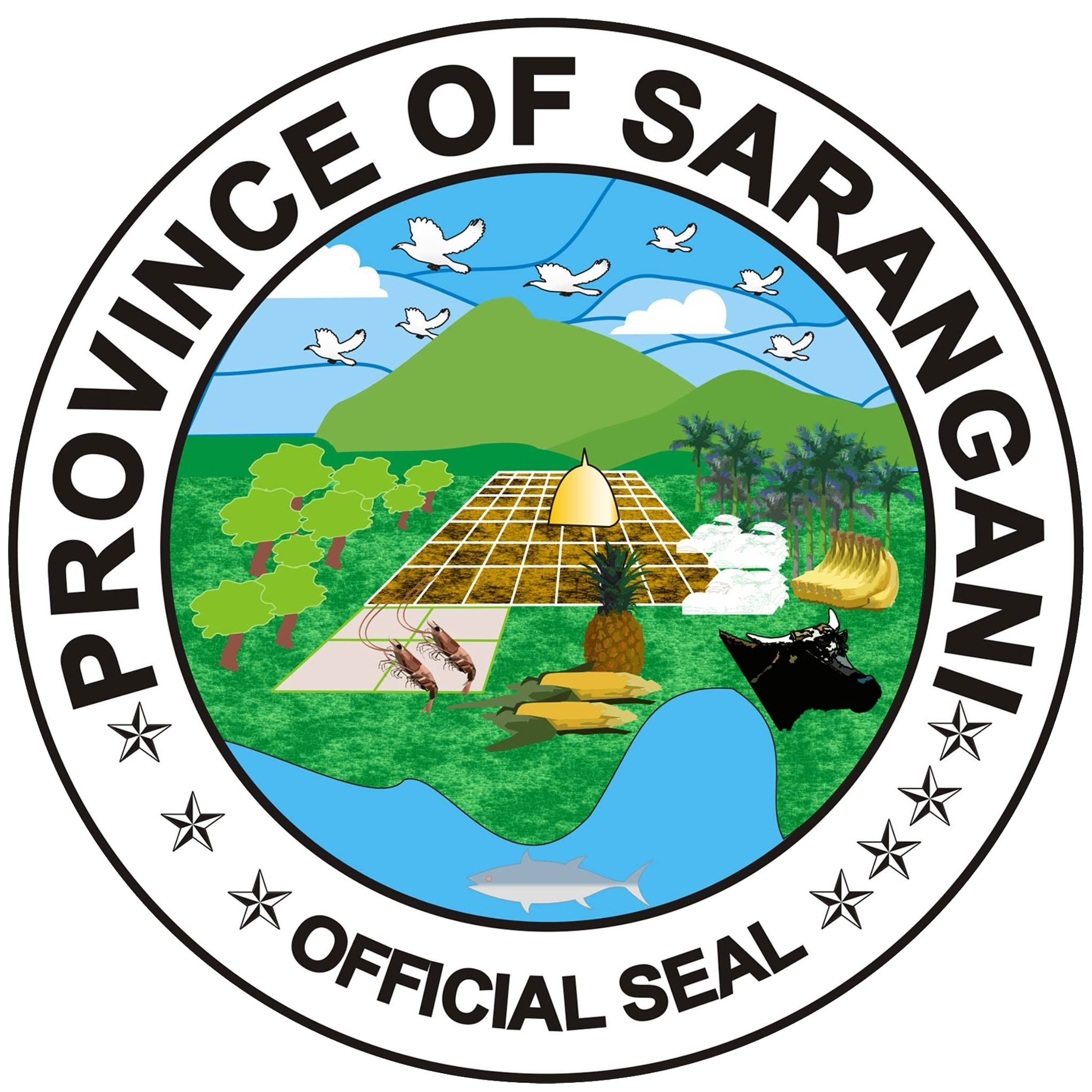
- Flag Seal
- Anthem: Sarangani, Land of Beauty
- Location in the Philippines
- Interactive map of Sarangani
- Coordinates: 5°52′N 125°17′E
- Country: Philippines
- Region: Soccsksargen
- Founded: May 19, 1992
- Capital: Alabel
- Largest Municipality: Glan

Government
  - Type: Sangguniang Panlalawigan
  - Governor: Rogelio D. Pacquiao (PFP)
  - Vice Governor: Danny A. Martinez (PCM)
  - Representative: Steve Solon (Lakas)
  - Legislature: Sarangani Provincial Board
  - Electorate: 373,178 voters (2025)

Area
  - Total: 3,601.25 km^{2} (1,390.45 sq mi)
  - Rank: 37th out of 82
- Highest elevation (Mount Busa): 2,083 m (6,834 ft)

Population (2024 census)
  - Total: 580,915
  - Rank: 55th out of 82
  - Density: 161.309/km^{2} (417.789/sq mi)
  - Rank: 58th out of 82
  - Households: 133,865

Divisions
  - Independent cities: 0
  - Component cities: 0
  - Municipalities: 7: Alabel; Glan; Kiamba; Maasim; Maitum; Malapatan; Malungon
  - Barangays: 142
  - Districts: Legislative district of Sarangani

Economy
  - Income class: 1st provincial income class
  - Poverty incidence: 23.1% (2023)
  - Revenue: ₱ 2,061 million (2024)
  - Assets: ₱ 6,208 million (2024)
  - Expenditure: ₱ 1,999 million (2024)
  - Liabilities: ₱ 1,418 million (2024)
- Time zone: UTC+8 (PST)
- PSGC: 128000000
- IDD : area code: +63 (0)83
- ISO 3166 code: PH-SAR
- Spoken languages: Cebuano; Hiligaynon; Maguindanaon; Blaan; Tboli; Sarangani; Sangil; Tagalog
- Website: www.sarangani.gov.ph

Sarangani, officially the Province of Sarangani (Cebuano: Lalawigan sa Sarangani; Hiligaynon: Kapuoran sang Sarangani; Maguindanaon: Dairat nu Sarangani, Jawi: دايرت نو سرڠان; Filipino: Lalawigan ng Sarangani), is a province in the Philippines located in the Soccsksargen region. Its capital is Alabel while Glan is the most populous municipality in the province. With a 230-kilometer (140 mi) coastline along the Sarangani Bay and Celebes Sea, the province is at the southernmost tip of Mindanao island, and borders South Cotabato and Davao del Sur to the north, Davao Occidental to the east, and the Celebes Sea to the south.

Sarangani is part of the South Cotabato-Cotabato-Sultan Kudarat-Sarangani-General Santos (Soccsksargen) development cluster, and is linked by paved roads to the international airport and harbor of General Santos.

The province is divided into two sections, separated by the Sarangani Bay and the city of General Santos, and it used to be part of South Cotabato until it was made an independent province in 1992.

== History ==
=== Early history ===
The earliest civilization in the province can be found in Maitum, Sarangani, where the Maitum Anthropomorphic Pottery or Maitum Jars were found. The jars have been dated to approximately 5 BC to 370 AD, one of the oldest in the entire Southeast Asian region and the Philippines. The discovery testified to the long history of cultural exchanges in Sarangani and its people.

The Sarangani was once part of Sultanate of Maguindanao. The establishment of the Sultanate in the area caused more Maguindanaon settlers arrival. After the fall of the Sultanate of Maguindanao as a great power in Mindanao, Datu Uto of Buayan expanded his domain towards Sarangani Bay. Sarangani would eventually be under the Sultanate of Buayan until the American era.

=== Spanish colonial era ===
Sarangani Island (now part of Davao Occidental) was named Antonia by the Spanish explorer Ruy López de Villalobos in 1543, in honor of Antonio de Mendoza y Pacheco, the viceroy of New Spain who had appointed López de Villalobos to lead an expedition to the Western Islands (now the Philippines) because of their relation by marriage. The early inhabitants who first inhabited Sarangani were the indigenous natives, called MunaTo, a native term for "first people."

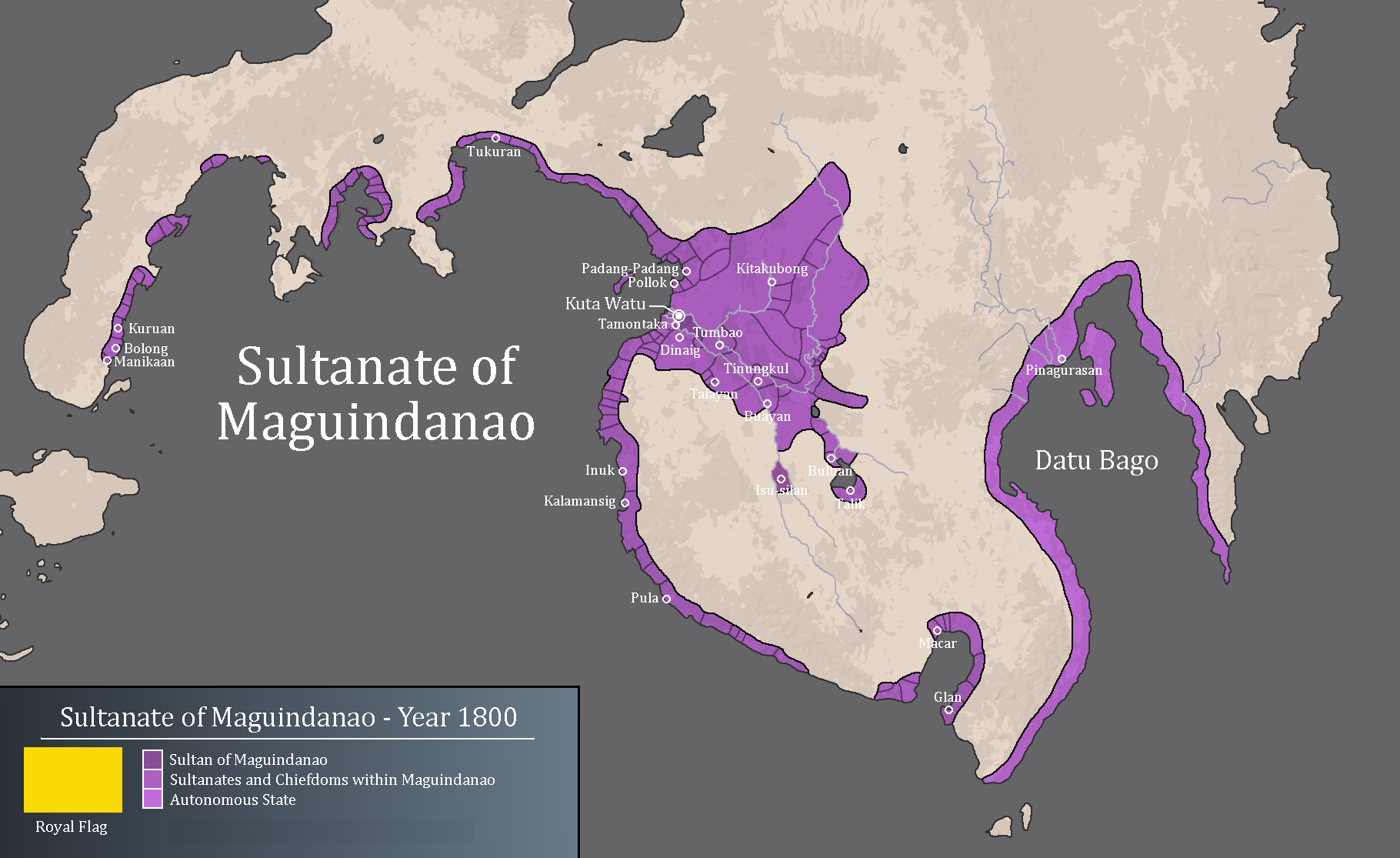
Map showing the present territories of Sarangani as part of Sultanate of Maguindanao in 1800s.

=== Japanese occupation ===
In 1942, the Japanese troops occupied Southern Cotabato. In 1945, Filipino troops of the 6th, 10th, 101st and 102nd Infantry Division of the Philippine Commonwealth Army and 10th Constabulary Regiment of the Philippine Constabulary entered in and liberated Southern Cotabato and fought against the Japanese Imperial Army forces during the Battle of Cotabato at the end of World War II under the Japanese Occupation.

=== Philippine independence ===
Before its inception in 1992, Sarangani was part of South Cotabato under its third district. The province was created by Republic Act No. 7228 on March 16, 1992, penned by Congressman James Chiongbian, who would later become the province's first representative to the House of Representatives, ratified in a plebiscite on May 19, 1992 and installed its first set of officials on November 28, 1992. His wife, Priscilla Chiongbian, became the first Governor of Sarangani.

The Sangil people are active in the struggle for self-determination as part of their strategy to preserve and develop their culture and social institutions. The creation of Sarangani province itself was an effort to ease tensions between the Sangil people and the Philippine government.

== Geography ==
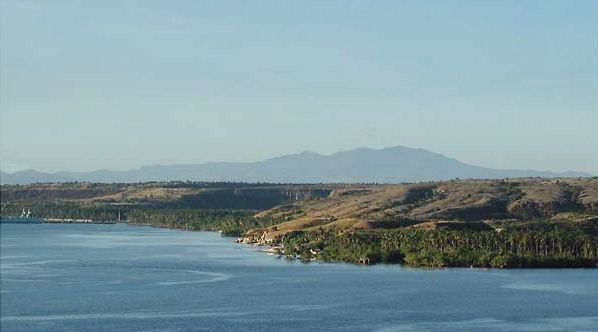
Western coast of the province at Maitum

Sarangani covers a total area of 3,601.25 square kilometers (1,390.45 sq mi) occupying the southern tip of the Soccsksargen in central Mindanao. The province is bordered on the central-north by South Cotabato, northeast by Davao del Sur, east by Davao Occidental, south by the Sarangani Bay and Celebes Sea, and northwest by Sultan Kudarat.

Sarangani is divided into two (eastern and western) sections, separated by the Sarangani Bay and General Santos in the middle. The western portion comprises the towns of Maitum, Kiamba, and Maasim, and is bounded on the north by South Cotabato and on the northwest by Sultan Kudarat. The eastern section consists of Alabel, Glan, Malapatan, and Malungon.

The General Santos Metropolitan Area or Metro General Santos is a metropolitan area encompassing the highly urbanized city of General Santos, The Regional Agro-Industrial Center of Alabel, the towns of Glan, Kiamba, Maasin, Maitum, Malapatan and Malungon and the neighboring provinces of South Cotabato adding Metro General Santos adding Lake Sebu, Polomolok, T'Boli and Tupi.

=== Administrative divisions ===
Sarangani comprises seven municipalities. A single legislative district encompasses all towns.

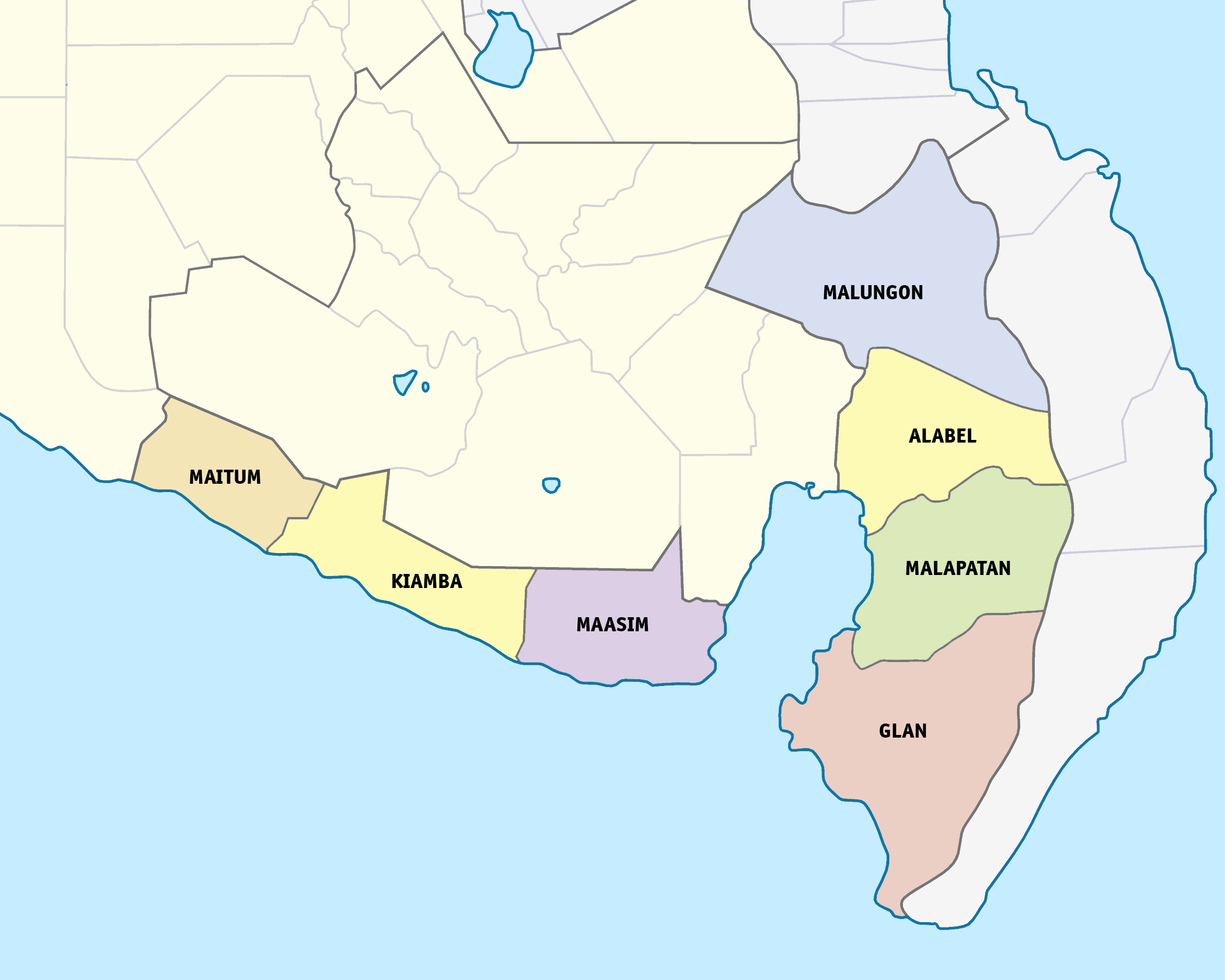
Political map of Sarangani

Municipality (Note: The globe icon marks the town center.)		Population			±% p.a.	Area		Density (2020)		Barangay
		(2020)		(2015)		km^{2}	sq mi	/km^{2}	/sq mi	
Alabel	†	15.8%	88,294	80,359	+1.81%	510.98	197.29	170	440	13
Glan		19.6%	109,547	118,263	−1.45%	610.30	235.64	180	470	31
Kiamba		11.8%	65,774	61,058	+1.43%	328.68	126.90	200	520	19
Maasim		11.6%	64,940	59,468	+1.69%	500.43	193.22	130	340	16
Maitum		7.9%	44,185	44,595	−0.18%	290.66	112.22	150	390	19
Malapatan		14.4%	80,741	76,914	+0.93%	609.28	235.24	130	340	12
Malungon		18.9%	105,465	103,604	+0.34%	750.92	289.93	140	360	31
Total			558,946	544,261	+0.51%	3,601.25	1,390.45	160	410	141
	† Provincial capital					Municipality				

== Demographics ==
Population census of Sarangani
Year	Pop.	±% p.a.
1918	19,043	—
1939	24,051	+1.12%
1948	36,166	+4.64%
1960	73,162	+6.05%
1970	127,637	+5.72%
1975	166,179	+5.43%
1980	219,372	+5.71%
1990	283,141	+2.59%
1995	367,006	+4.98%
2000	410,622	+2.44%
2007	475,514	+2.04%
2010	498,904	+1.76%
2015	544,261	+1.67%
2020	558,946	+0.56%
2024	580,915	+0.93%
Source: Philippine Statistics Authority

The population of Sarangani in the 2024 census was 580,915 people, with a density of 160 inhabitants per square kilometer or 410 inhabitants per square mile.

=== Religion ===
Religion in Sarangani
Religion	percentage
Roman Catholic	48%
Protestant	31%
Islam	9%
Iglesia ni Cristo	2%
Others	10%

Christianity is the majority religion in the province with a total of 79% (48% Roman Catholicism and 31% evangelicals). Other religious minorities are Islam (9%) and Iglesia ni Cristo (2%). The remainder is usually divided among other Christian churches. The majority of Muslims are from the Sangil, Maguindanao, and Kalagan ethnic groups. Furthermore, there are quite a few individuals who have converted to Islam, also known as Balik Islam (reverting to Islam).

=== Ethnic groups ===
Sarangani has a huge ethnic diversity, such as Lumads, consisting of Blaan, T'boli, Tagakaulo, Kalagan, Manobo, Ubo, Moro Muslims, and Christian settlers, mainly from Cebu, Bohol, Siquijor, Negros and Panay in Visayas and Ilocandia and Cagayan Valley in Luzon Muslims comprise 7 ethnic groups, Lumads 17 ethnic groups, and Christian migrant settlers, at least 20 ethnic groups. Sarangani and Sangil peoples, although no longer dominant, still have a presence here. Being one of the most ethnically and linguistically diverse regions in Mindanao.

The Blaan people are the largest minority and are spread across the municipalities of Malapatan, Glan, Alabel, Maasim, and Malungon. Most of Blaan people lives in Malapatan, constituting 37% of the municipality's population. Other ethnic groups, such as the Maguindanao people reside in the municipalities of Malapatan, Maitum, and Maasim, the T'boli people mostly reside in Maitum, Kiamba, and Maasim, while the Tagakaulo people is almost entirely in Malungon. Cebuano settlers are found in Glan and Alabel, Ilonggo (Hiligaynon) are located in Malungon, while Ilocano mostly live in Kiamba and Maitum.

Thus, the mixed population of Sarangani is quite diverse, with the language of the Christian settlers being used commonly by both Moro Muslims and natives, consisting of the Blaan and Cebuano-speaking Muslims on the east coast, the Tboli, Manobo, and Ilocano-speaking Muslims on the west coast, and the Ilonggo-speaking Blaan and Tagakaulo peoples of the northern highlands.

== Economy ==
Poverty incidence of Sarangani (%)

Source: Philippine Statistics Authority

Coconut, corn, rice, banana, mango, durian, rubber, and sugarcane are major crops now being planted by the inhabitants. The province has plantations (mango, banana, pineapple, asparagus), cattle ranches, and commercial fishponds that have been operating in the area, some of which having existed as far back as 40 years.

Electricity comes from the National Power Corporation, and augmented by a 50 MW power plant in Alabel, the province's capital. Water is provided for by sustainable spring development projects.

== Government ==
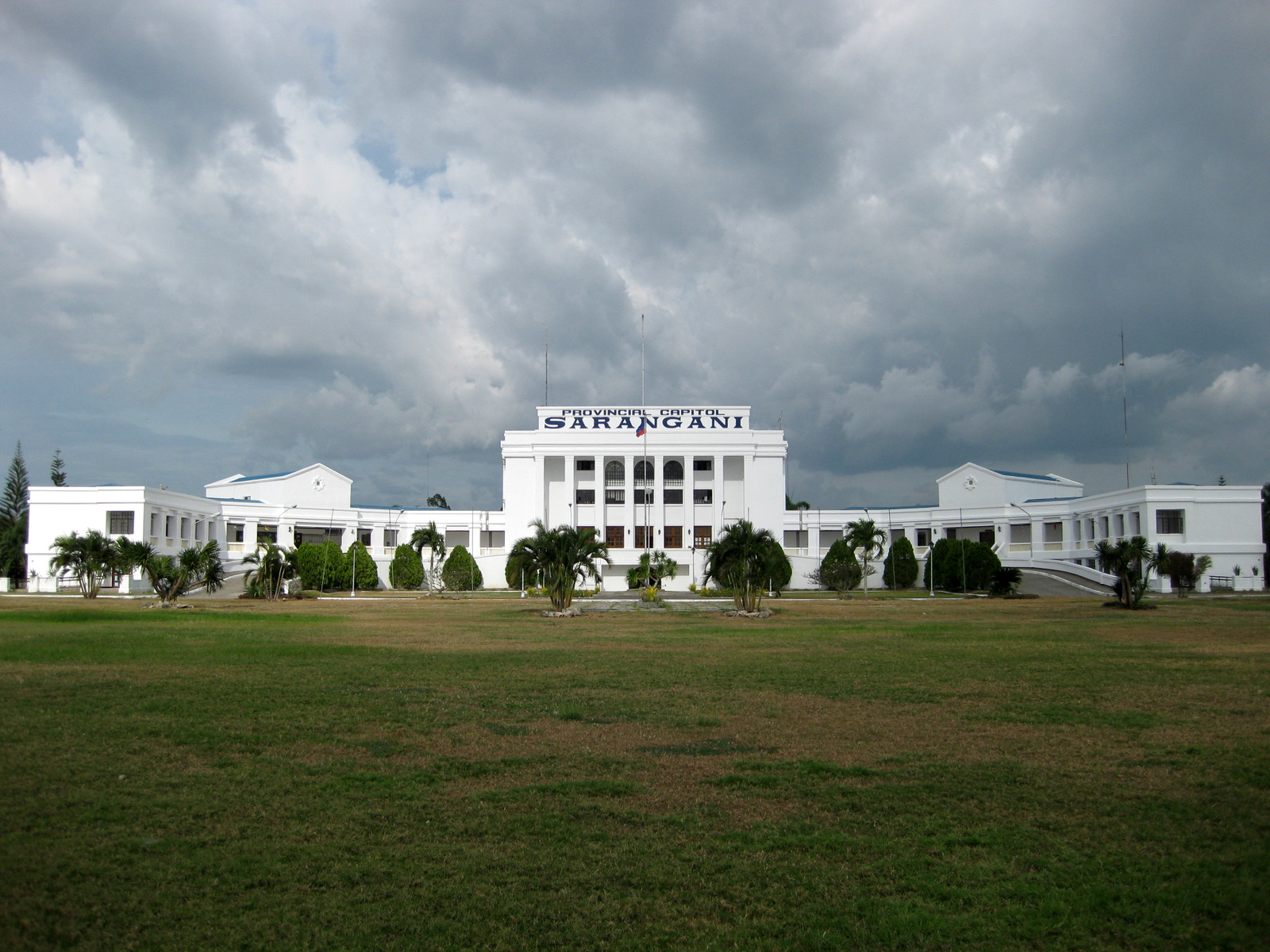
Sarangani Provincial Capitol

Elected Officials (2025-2028)

- Rep. Steve Chiongbian Solon
- Gov. Rogelio D. Pacquiao
- Vice Gov. Danny A. Martinez

Elected Officials (2022-2025)

- Rep. Steve Chiongbian Solon
- Gov. Rogelio D. Pacquiao
- Vice Gov. Elmer T. de Peralta

Elected Officials (2019-2022)

- Rep. Rogelio D. Pacquiao
- Gov. Steve Chiongbian Solon
- Vice Gov. Elmer T. de Peralta

Elected Officials (2016-2022)

- Rep. Rogelio D. Pacquiao
- Gov. Steve Chiongbian Solon
- Vice Gov. Elmer T. de Peralta

Elected Officials (2013-2016)

- Rep. Emmanuel "Manny" Pacquiao
- Gov. Steve Chiongbian Solon
- Vice Gov. Jinkee J. Pacquiao

Elected Officials (2010-2013)

- Rep. Emmanuel "Manny" Pacquiao
- Gov. Miguel Rene Alcantara Dominguez
- Vice Gov. Steve Chiongbian Solon

Elected Officials (2007-2010)

- Rep. Erwin Chiongbian
- Gov. Miguel Rene Alcantara Dominguez
- Vice Gov. Steve Chiongbian Solon

Elected Officials (2004-2007)

- Rep. Erwin Chiongbian
- Gov. Miguel Rene Alcantara Dominguez
- Vice Gov. Bridget Chiongbian-Huang

Elected Officials (2001-2004)

- Rep. Erwin Chiongbian
- Gov. Miguel Escobar
- Vice Gov. Felipe Constantino

Elected Officials (1998-2001)

- Rep. Juan Domino*
- Gov. Priscilla Chiongbian
- Vice Gov. Miguel Escobar

Elected Officials (1995-1998)

- Rep. James Chiongbian (as Lone District of Sarangani)
- Gov. Priscilla Chiongbian
- Vice Gov. Miguel Escobar

Elected Officials (1992-1995)

- Rep. James Chiongbian (as Third District of South Cotabato)
- Gov. Priscilla Chiongbian
- Vice Gov. Miguel Escobar

Note

- *-Rep.Juan Domino was Disqualified due to a lack of Residency

== Tourism ==
Sarangani celebrates its foundation anniversary every November, named as MunaTo Festival.

Sarangani has ancient burial jars, discovered by archaeologists from the National Museum in Ayub Cave in Maitum, in 1991 and in 2008, and at Sagel Cave in Maitum (now declared by National Historical Institute as a national historical site). Amid Mindanao's armed conflicts, artifacts found thereat prove settlements of pre-historic civilization in Maitum.

== Notable people ==
- Manny Pacquiao - boxer and former senator having his family from Sarangani.
- Jinkee Pacquiao - wife of Manny Pacquiao and former Sarangani vice governor (2013). Her family is from Sarangani.
