= Steve Solon =

Filipino politician (born 1971)

Steve Chiongbian Solon
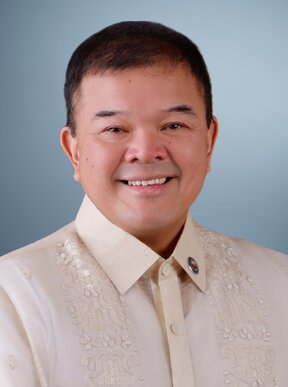
- Official portrait, 2025

Member of the Philippine House of Representatives from Sarangani's at-large district
- Incumbent
- Assumed office June 30, 2022
- Preceded by: Rogelio Pacquiao

4th Governor of Sarangani
- In office June 30, 2013 – June 30, 2022
- Vice Governor: Jinkee Pacquiao (2013–2016); Elmer de Peralta (2016–2022)
- Preceded by: Miguel Rene Alcantara Dominguez
- Succeeded by: Rogelio Pacquiao

Vice Governor of Sarangani
- In office June 30, 2007 – June 30, 2013
- Governor: Miguel Rene Alcantara Dominguez
- Preceded by: Bridget Chiongbian-Huang
- Succeeded by: Jinkee Pacquiao

Personal details
- Born: March 3, 1971 (age 55) Makati, Rizal, Philippines
- Party: NUP (2026–present); PCM (local party; 2012–present)
- Other political affiliations: Lakas (2007–2012; 2022–2026); PDP–Laban (2018–2022); UNA (2012–2016)
- Spouse: Michelle Lopez
- Education: Valley Forge Military Academy and College (AA); Fordham University (BSBA); Ateneo de Manila University (MBA); Duke University (MA)
- Occupation: Politician
- Profession: Businessman

Steve Chiongbian Solon (born March 3, 1971) is a Filipino businessman and politician who has served as the representative for Sarangani's at-large district since 2022. He previously served as the fourth governor of Sarangani from 2013 to 2022 and as vice governor from 2007 to 2013.

The grandson of James and Priscilla Chiongbian, who served as representative and governor, respectively, Solon carries a background in business.

In February 2025, Solon was one of the 95 Lakas–CMD members of Congress who voted to impeach vice president Sara Duterte.

== Early life and education ==
After receiving his Associate’s Degree from Valley Forge Military Academy in Pennsylvania, he completed his Bachelor of Science degree in Business Administration from Fordham University in New York.

Straight out of college, Solon passed the General Securities Representative Exam (Series 7) and the Uniform Securities Agent State Law Examination (Series 63) and became a licensed stock broker on Wall Street.

After spending several years in the United States, Solon moved back to the Philippines in 1996 and continued his career in the financial industry managing several local and global equities portfolios. It was also during this time, as a working student, Steve obtained a Master of Business Administration degree from the Ateneo Graduate School of Business, and graduated on the Dean’s List. He then went on to spend another two years securing another Master’s degree in International Development Policy from Duke University’s, Sanford School of Public Policy in North Carolina.

== Political career ==
=== Vice governor of Sarangani (2007–2013) ===
In 2007, Solon ran for vice governor of Sarangani and spent two terms heading the legislative branch of government.

=== Governor of Sarangani (2013–2022) ===
In 2013, Solon became the fourth governor of Sarangani.

=== House of Representatives (2022–present) ===
On June 9, 2022, Solon left PDP-Laban to join the Lakas–CMD party prior to the start of the 19th Congress. On February 5, 2025, Solon was among the 95 Lakas–CMD members who voted to impeach vice president Sara Duterte.
