= People's Champ Movement =

Political party in the Philippines

- President: Rogelio Pacquiao
- Chairman: Manny Pacquiao
- Secretary-General: Raul Martinez
- Founder: Manny Pacquiao
- Founded: September 4, 2008 (organized); May 7, 2009 (registered)
- Headquarters: General Santos, Soccsksargen
- Ideology: Christian democracy Social conservatism Asian values Far-right populism Liberalism
- Political position: Centre-right to far-right
- National affiliation: PROMDI (since 2021); UNA (2012–2016); Liberal (2010–2012)
- Colors: Orange
- House of Representatives: 1 / 1 (Sarangani seats only)
- Provincial governors: 1 / 1 (Sarangani seats only)
- Provincial vice governors: 1 / 1 (Sarangani seats only)
- Provincial board members: 11 / 14 (Sarangani seats only)

The People's Champ Movement (PCM) is a political party in the Philippines, currently affiliated with the PROMDI and previously the United Nationalist Alliance. It is led by Manny Pacquiao, who founded the party, and is mainly based in General Santos and Sarangani.

The party also ran for a seat in the congress in the 2019 elections, but they ranked 97 out of 134 running party-lists, thus not winning a seat. The votes they have are only 60,040, 0.22% of the national votes.

== Members ==
The party has seven elected officials:

- Elmer De Peralta - Vice-Governor of Sarangani

2016-present

- Jinkee Pacquiao – Vice-Governor of Sarangani

2013–2016

- Steve Solon – Governor of Sarangani 2013–2022 and Vice-Governor 2007–2013
- Manny Pacquiao – Senator of the Philippines

2016–2022, Former Congressman of Sarangani 2010-2016 and Leader of PCM

- Rogelio Pacquiao - Former Congressman 2016-2022 and Incumbent Governor of Sarangani 2022-present.
- Lorelie Pacquiao - Incumbent Mayor of General Santos City 2022-present.
- Ronnel Rivera - Former Mayor of General Santos City 2013-2022.
