= 2013 Philippine local elections =

Local election held in the Philippines

- May 13, 2013
Provincial governors and vice governors	80 each	Steady
Provincial boards	80	Steady
Provincial board members	766	▲4
Mayors and vice mayors	1,634 each	▲3
City and municipal councils	1,634	▲3
City and municipal councilors	13,530	▲212

Local elections were held in the Philippines on May 13, 2013, the same day and on the same ballot as national elections. Elected were governors, mayors and council members of Philippine provinces, Philippine cities and Philippine municipalities. Separate elections for barangay officials were held on October.

Positions to be elected are mayors, vice mayors, and councilors, and if applicable, governors, vice governors and provincial board members. There will be elected 80 provincial governors, 80 provincial vice governors, 766 members of the Sangguniang Panlalawigan (provincial board), 138 city mayors, 138 city vice mayors, 1,532 members of the Sangguniang Panlungsod (city council), 1,496 municipal mayors, 1,496 municipal vice mayors, and 11,972 members of the Sangguniang Bayan (municipal council).

Also included are elections in the Autonomous Region in Muslim Mindanao (ARMM) that were supposed to have been held in 2011 but were postponed and synchronized with the triennial elections. Voters in the ARMM will be electing one regional governor, one regional vice governor and 24 members of the regional assembly.

== Elections by position ==
Position	Number of positions	Notes
Senators	12	
Party-list representatives	58	
District representatives	234	
Regional governor	1	ARMM only
Regional vice governor	1	ARMM only
Regional assemblymen	24	ARMM only
Provincial governors	80	Some cities don't elect provincial officials.
Provincial vice governors	80	Some cities don't elect provincial officials.
Provincial board members	766	Some cities don't elect provincial officials.
Mayors	1,634	
Vice mayors	1,634	
Councilors	13,530	
Total	18,054	

== Regional-level elections ==
The voters in the Autonomous Region in Muslim Mindanao (ARMM) elect a regional government, composed of a regional governor and a regional vice governor voted separately and under the first past the post system, and a regional assembly composed of three assemblymen elected from each district under the plurality-at-large voting system.

The election was scheduled for 2011, but was postponed to 2013 to be synchronized with the rest of the country. The winning candidates will take over from the appointees of President Benigno Aquino III, who replaced the officials who had their terms expire on 2011.

== Provincial-level elections ==
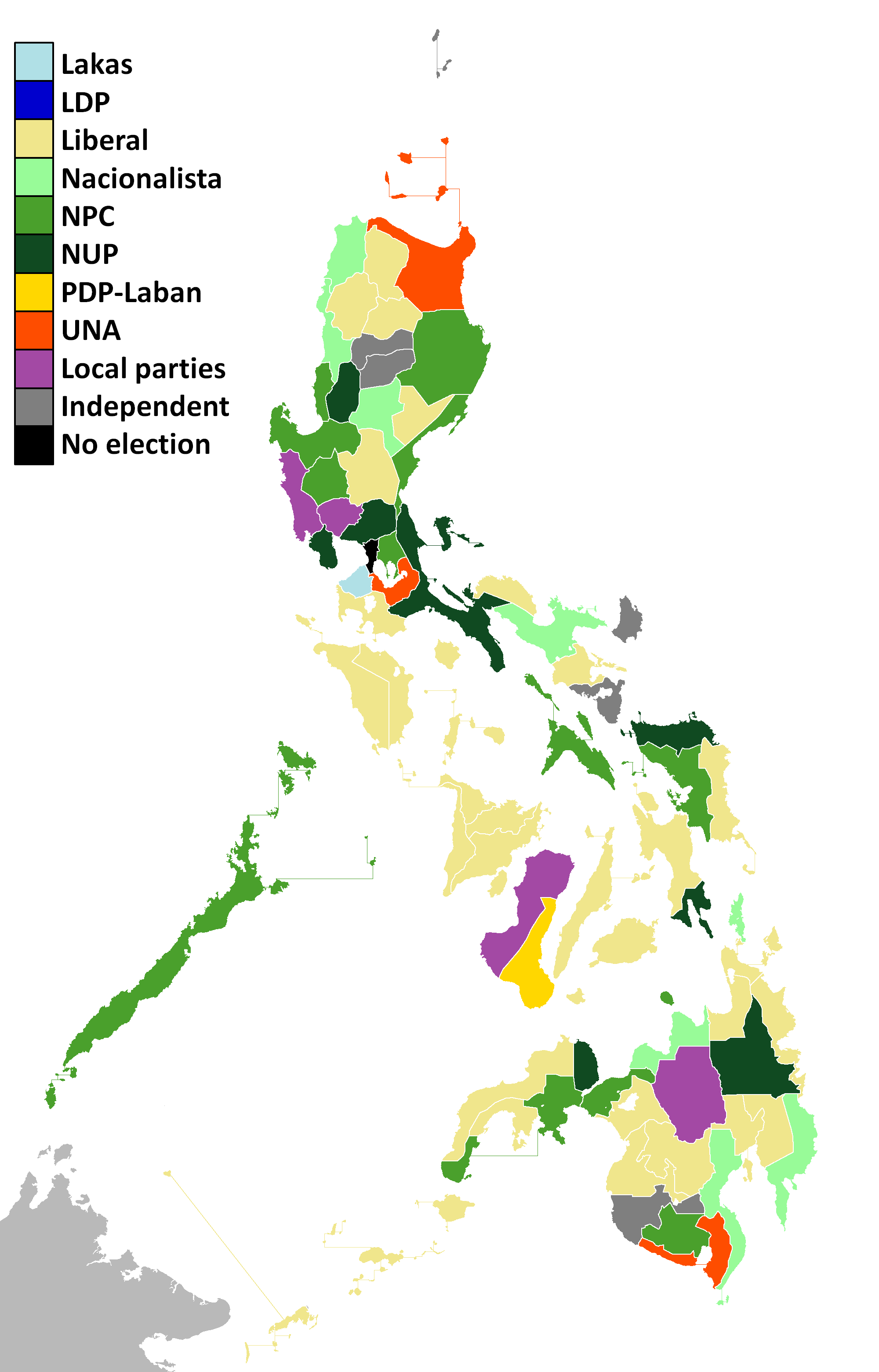
Provincial governor elections results.

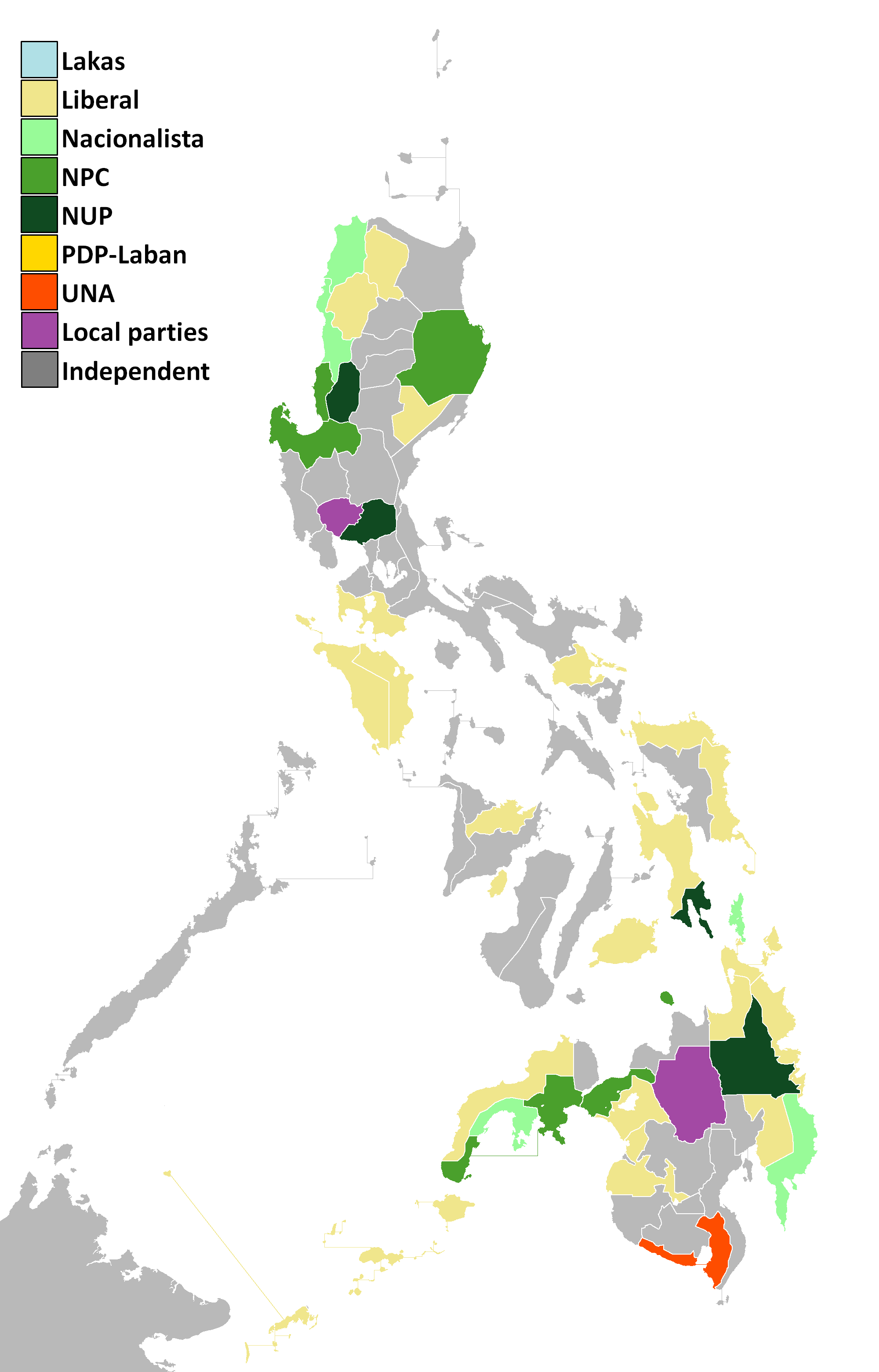
Provincial board elections results.

Each province is headed by a governor and a vice governor. The governor is the chief executive of the province, while the vice governor acts as the governor once the latter is unable to perform his duties, and has the casting vote in the provincial board in case of a tie on a measure, among other powers. While most governors and vice governors run on one ticket, the positions are elected separately, and the winners may come from different tickets.

Each province has a Sangguniang Panlalawigan or provincial board, the legislative body of the province. A province's number of provincial board members depends on its financial standing (generally, the more populous provinces are richer), with the richest provinces having up to 14 board members. In addition, the provincial board has a seat reserved for the president of the provincial chapter of the League of Councilors which are indirectly elected from the city and municipal levels, and two more seats reserved for the presidents of the provincial chapters of the Association of Barangay (village) Captains (ABC) and of the Sangguniang Kabataan (SK; youth councils). These ex officio members are indirectly elected from the municipal and city levels, which were elected by the people in 2010; an election later in the year may change the membership of those two ex officio members.

Election for the provincial board is via first past the post for single-member districts, and plurality-at-large voting for multi-member districts.

=== Gubernatorial elections ===
The following are the results of the gubernatorial elections by party:

Party	Seats
Liberal Party	36
Nationalist People's Coalition	12
National Unity Party	8
Nacionalista Party	7
United Nationalist Alliance	3
Bukidnon Paglaum	1
Kambilan	1
Lakas–CMD	1
Nationalist People's Coalition/Biskeg na Pangasinan	1
Nationalist People's Coalition/Partidong Pagbabago ng Palawan	1
PDP–Laban	1
Sulong Zambales Party	1
United Nationalist Alliance/People's Champ Movement	1
United Negros Alliance	1
Independent	5
Total	80
Source: Commission on Elections

The following are the results of the gubernatorial elections by province:

Province	Elected governor	Party
Abra	Takit Bersamin	Liberal
Agusan del Norte	Angelica Amante	Liberal
Agusan del Sur	Adolph Edward Plaza	NUP
Aklan	Florencio Miraflores	Liberal
Albay	Joey Salceda	Liberal
Antique	Exequiel Javier	Liberal
Apayao	Elias Bulut Jr.	Liberal
Aurora	Gerardo Noveras	NPC
Basilan	Jum Jainudin Akbar	Liberal
Bataan	Albert Garcia	NUP
Batanes	Vicente Gato	Independent
Batangas	Vilma Santos	Liberal
Benguet	Nestor Fongwan	NUP
Biliran	Gerardo Espina Jr.	Liberal
Bohol	Edgar Chatto	Liberal
Bukidnon	Jose Maria Zubiri Jr.	BPP
Bulacan	Wilhelmino Sy-Alvarado	NUP
Cagayan	Alvaro Antonio	UNA
Camarines Norte	Edgar Tallado	Liberal
Camarines Sur	Miguel Luis Villafuerte	Nacionalista
Camiguin	Jurdin Jesus Romualdo	NPC
Capiz	Victor Tanco	Liberal
Catanduanes	Araceli Wong	Independent
Cavite	Jonvic Remulla	Lakas
Cebu	Hilario Davide III	Liberal
Compostela Valley	Arturo Uy	Liberal
Cotabato	Emmylou Mendoza	Liberal
Davao del Norte	Rodolfo del Rosario	Liberal
Davao del Sur	Claude Bautista	NPC
Davao Oriental	Corazon Malanyaon	Nacionalista
Dinagat Islands	Glenda Ecleo	Nacionalista
Eastern Samar	Conrado Nicart Jr.	Liberal
Guimaras	Samuel Gumarin	Liberal
Ifugao	Denis Habawel	Independent
Ilocos Norte	Imee Marcos	Nacionalista
Ilocos Sur	Ryan Luis Singson	Nacionalista
Iloilo	Arthur Defensor Sr.	Liberal
Isabela	Bojie Dy	NPC
Kalinga	Jocel Baac	Liberal
La Union	Manuel Ortega	NPC
Laguna	E. R. Ejercito	UNA
Lanao del Norte	Mohamad Khalid Dimaporo	NPC
Lanao del Sur	Mamintal Adiong Jr.	Liberal
Leyte	Leopoldo Petilla	Liberal
Maguindanao	Esmael Mangudadatu	Liberal
Marinduque	Carmencita Reyes	Liberal
Masbate	Rizalina Lanete	NPC
Misamis Occidental	Herminia Ramiro	NUP
Misamis Oriental	Yevgeny Emano	Nacionalista
Mountain Province	Leonard Mayaen	Independent
Negros Occidental	Alfredo Marañon	UNegA
Negros Oriental	Roel Degamo	PDP–Laban
Northern Samar	Jose Ong Jr.	NUP
Nueva Ecija	Aurelio Umali	Liberal
Nueva Vizcaya	Ruth Padilla	Nacionalista
Occidental Mindoro	Mario Gene Mendiola	Liberal
Oriental Mindoro	Alfonso Umali Jr.	Liberal
Palawan	Jose Alvarez	NPC/PPPL
Pampanga	Lilia Pineda	Kambilan
Pangasinan	Amado Espino Jr.	NPC/Biskeg
Quezon	David Suarez	NUP
Quirino	Junie Cua	Liberal
Rizal	Rebecca Ynares	NPC
Romblon	Eduardo Firmalo	Liberal
Samar	Sharee Ann Tan	NPC
Sarangani	Steve Solon	UNA/PCM
Siquijor	Zaldy Villa	Liberal
Sorsogon	Raul Lee	UNA
South Cotabato	Daisy Avance Fuentes	NPC
Southern Leyte	Roger Mercado	NUP
Sultan Kudarat	Suharto Mangudadatu	Independent
Sulu	Abdusakur Tan II	Liberal
Surigao del Norte	Sol Matugas	Liberal
Surigao del Sur	Johnny Pimentel	Liberal
Tarlac	Victor Yap	NPC
Tawi-Tawi	Nurbert Sahali	Liberal
Zambales	Jun Ebdane	SZP
Zamboanga del Norte	Roberto Uy	Liberal
Zamboanga del Sur	Antonio Cerilles	NPC
Zamboanga Sibugay	Wilter Palma	Liberal

=== Vice gubernatorial elections ===
The following are the results of the vice gubernatorial elections by province:

Province	Elected vice governor	Party
Abra	Rosario Bersamin	Liberal
Agusan del Norte	Ramon Bungabong	Liberal
Agusan del Sur	Santiago Cane Jr.	NUP
Aklan	Gabrielle Calizo-Quimpo	Nacionalista
Albay	Harold Imperial	Liberal
Antique	Rhodora Cadiao	UNA
Apayao	Hector Reuel Pascua	Liberal
Aurora	Rommel T. Angara	LDP
Basilan	Keemhar Jay Sakkalahul	Liberal
Bataan	Efren Dominic Pascual Jr.	Liberal
Batanes	Ronald Aguto	Independent
Batangas	Mark Leviste	Liberal
Benguet	Nelson Dangwa	Liberal
Biliran	Eriberto Tubis Jr.	Liberal
Bohol	Concepcion Lim	Liberal
Bukidnon	Alex Calingasan	BPP
Bulacan	Daniel Fernando	NUP
Cagayan	Leonides Fausto	Nacionalista
Camarines Norte	Jonah Pedro Pimentel	Liberal
Camarines Sur	Fortunato Peña	Nacionalista
Camiguin	James Ederango	NPC
Capiz	Esteban Evan Contreras	Liberal
Catanduanes	Jose Teves Jr.	Lakas
Cavite	Jolo Revilla	Lakas
Cebu	Agnes Magpale	Liberal
Compostela Valley	Manuel E. Zamora	Liberal
Cotabato	Gregorio Ipong	Independent
Davao del Norte	Victorio Suaybaguio Jr.	Liberal
Davao del Sur	Aileen Almendras	NPC
Davao Oriental	Joel Mayo Almario	Lakas
Dinagat Islands	Benglen Ecleo	Nacionalista
Eastern Samar	Marcelo Ferdinand Picardal	LDP
Guimaras	Vicente de Asis	Liberal
Ifugao	Pedro Mayam-o	Liberal
Ilocos Norte	Angelo Barba	Nacionalista
Ilocos Sur	Deogracias Victor Savellano	Nacionalista
Iloilo	Raul Tupas	Liberal/Ugyon
Isabela	Tonypet Albano	Independent
Kalinga	Allen Jesse Mangaoang	Nacionalista
La Union	Aurelio Augusto Nisce	NPC
Laguna	Ramil Hernandez	Nacionalista
Lanao del Norte	Maria Cristina Atay	NPC
Lanao del Sur	Arsad Marohombsar	Liberal
Leyte	Carlo Loreto	Liberal
Maguindanao	Lester Sinsuat	Liberal
Marinduque	Romulo Bacorro	Liberal
Masbate	Vicente Revil	NPC
Misamis Occidental	Aurora Virgina Almonte	Independent
Misamis Oriental	Jose Mari Pelaez	UNA
Mountain Province	Bonifacio Lacwasan	Independent
Negros Occidental	Bong Lacson	NPC
Negros Oriental	Edward Mark Macias	Liberal
Northern Samar	Gary Lavin	NUP
Nueva Ecija	Jose Gay Padiernos	Liberal
Nueva Vizcaya	Epifanio Lamberto Galima	Nacionalista
Occidental Mindoro	Peter Alfaro	Liberal
Oriental Mindoro	Humerlito Dolor	Liberal
Palawan	Victorino Dennis Socrates	NUP/PPPL
Pampanga	Dennis Pineda	NPC/Kambilan
Pangasinan	Jose Calimlim Jr.	NPC/Biskeg
Quezon	Samuel Nantes	Liberal
Quirino	May Calaunan	Liberal
Rizal	Frisco San Juan Jr.	NPC
Romblon	Jose Riano	Liberal
Samar	Stephen James Tan	Nacionalista
Sarangani	Jinkee Pacquiao	UNA/PCM
Siquijor	Fernando Avanzado	Liberal
Sorsogon	Antonio Escudero Jr.	NPC
South Cotabato	Cecile Diel	UNA
Southern Leyte	Sheffered Tan	Liberal
Sultan Kudarat	Ernesto Matias	UNA
Sulu	Abdusakur Mahail Tan	Liberal
Surigao del Norte	Arturo Carlos Egay Jr.	Liberal
Surigao del Sur	Manuel Alameda Sr.	Liberal
Tarlac	Henry Cojuangco	NPC
Tawi-Tawi	Michail Ahaja	Liberal
Zambales	Ramon Lacbain II	SZP
Zamboanga del Norte	Senen Angeles	Liberal
Zamboanga del Sur	Juan Regala	NPC
Zamboanga Sibugay	Rey Andre Olegario	Nacionalista

=== Provincial board elections ===
The following are the results of the provincial board elections by party:

Party	Seats
Liberal Party	300
Nationalist People's Coalition	101
Nacionalista Party	100
National Unity Party	74
United Nationalist Alliance	33
Lakas–CMD	18
United Nationalist Alliance/People's Champ Movement	9
Bukidnon Paglaum	8
Nationalist People's Coalition/Biskeg na Pangasinan	8
Kambilan	7
Partidong Pagbabago ng Palawan	6
Sulong Zambales Party	6
Laban ng Demokratikong Pilipino	5
Kusog Baryohanon	4
Nationalist People's Coalition/Bagong Lakas ng Nueva Ecija	4
PDP–Laban	4
Unang Sigaw	4
Pwersa ng Masang Pilipino	3
Barug Alang sa Kauswagan ug Demokrasya	2
Sandugo para sa Kaunlaran	2
United Nationalist Alliance/Abyan Ilonggo Party	2
United Negros Alliance	2
Aksyon Demokratiko	1
Nationalist People's Coalition/United Negros Alliance	1
Ompia Party	1
Padajon Surigao	1
Ugyon	1
Independent	57
Total	764
Source: Commission on Elections

The totals do not include sectoral and reserved seats.

The following are the results of the provincial board elections by province:

Province	Elected seats	Party	Seats won
Abra	8	Liberal	6
Abra	8	Aksyon	1
Abra	8	Nacionalista	1
Agusan del Norte	8	Liberal	7
Agusan del Norte	8	UNA	1
Agusan del Sur	10	NUP	10
Aklan	10	Liberal	6
Aklan	10	UNA	2
Aklan	10	Lakas	1
Aklan	10	Nacionalista	1
Albay	10	Liberal	8
Albay	10	Independent	2
Antique	10	Liberal	5
Antique	10	UNA	3
Antique	10	Independent	2
Apayao	8	Liberal	6
Apayao	8	Nacionalista	1
Apayao	8	NPC	1
Aurora	8	LDP	5
Aurora	8	Nacionalista	2
Aurora	8	NPC	1
Basilan	8	Liberal	8
Bataan	10	NUP	6
Bataan	10	Liberal	3
Bataan	10	Nacionalista	1
Batanes	6	Liberal	3
Batanes	6	Independent	3
Batangas	10	Liberal	9
Batangas	10	NPC	1
Benguet	10	NUP	9
Benguet	10	Independent	1
Biliran	8	Liberal	6
Biliran	8	NPC	1
Biliran	8	Independent	1
Bohol	10	Liberal	7
Bohol	10	NPC	2
Bohol	10	UNA	1
Bukidnon	10	BPP	8
Bukidnon	10	Liberal	1
Bukidnon	10	Independent	1
Bulacan	10	NUP	8
Bulacan	10	Liberal	1
Bulacan	10	Nacionalista	1
Cagayan	10	UNA	4
Cagayan	10	NUP	3
Cagayan	10	Nacionalista	2
Cagayan	10	Liberal	1
Camarines Norte	10	NUP	6
Camarines Norte	10	Liberal	3
Camarines Norte	10	Independent	1
Camarines Sur	10	Nacionalista	4
Camarines Sur	10	NPC	4
Camarines Sur	10	Liberal	1
Camarines Sur	10	Independent	1
Camiguin	6	NPC	6
Capiz	10	Liberal	8
Capiz	10	NUP	2
Catanduanes	8	Liberal	4
Catanduanes	8	Lakas	1
Catanduanes	8	NPC	1
Catanduanes	8	UNA	1
Catanduanes	8	Independent	1
Cavite	14	Lakas	7
Cavite	14	Liberal	4
Cavite	14	NUP	2
Cavite	14	Nacionalista	1
Cebu	12	Liberal	6
Cebu	12	Bakud	2
Cebu	12	NUP	2
Cebu	12	One Cebu	2
Compostela Valley	10	Liberal	10
Cotabato	10	Liberal	6
Cotabato	10	PMP	1
Cotabato	10	Independent	3
Davao del Norte	10	Liberal	4
Davao del Norte	10	KB	4
Davao del Norte	10	Independent	2
Davao del Sur	10	NPC	6
Davao del Sur	10	Nacionalista	4
Davao Oriental	10	Nacionalista	9
Davao Oriental	10	Liberal	1
Dinagat Islands	10	Nacionalista	9
Dinagat Islands	10	Liberal	1
Eastern Samar	10	Liberal	8
Eastern Samar	10	Nacionalista	2
Guimaras	8	Liberal	6
Guimaras	8	UNA	1
Guimaras	8	Independent	1
Ifugao	8	Liberal	2
Ifugao	8	Independent	6
Ilocos Norte	10	Nacionalista	8
Ilocos Norte	10	Liberal	1
Ilocos Norte	10	NPC	1
Ilocos Sur	10	Nacionalista	8
Ilocos Sur	10	Liberal	1
Ilocos Sur	10	Independent	1
Iloilo	10	Liberal	6
Iloilo	10	UNA/AI	2
Iloilo	10	NPC	1
Iloilo	10	Ugyon	1
Isabela	10	NPC	7
Isabela	10	Nacionalista	1
Isabela	10	Independent	2
Kalinga	8	Nacionalista	2
Kalinga	8	Lakas	1
Kalinga	8	Liberal	1
Kalinga	8	Independent	4
La Union	10	NPC	8
La Union	10	Lakas	1
La Union	10	Liberal	1
Laguna	10	UNA	4
Laguna	10	Liberal	3
Laguna	10	Nacionalista	1
Laguna	10	Independent	2
Lanao del Norte	10	NPC	9
Lanao del Norte	10	Liberal	1
Lanao del Sur	10	Liberal	7
Lanao del Sur	10	Ompia	1
Lanao del Sur	10	PDP–Laban	1
Lanao del Sur	10	Independent	1
Leyte	10	Liberal	10
Maguindanao	10	Liberal	9
Maguindanao	10	PDP–Laban	1
Marinduque	8	Liberal	5
Marinduque	8	NUP	2
Marinduque	8	Independent	1
Masbate	10	NPC	5
Masbate	10	Nacionalista	2
Masbate	10	NUP	2
Masbate	10	PMP	1
Misamis Occidental	10	NUP	5
Misamis Occidental	10	Nacionalista	4
Misamis Occidental	10	UNA	1
Misamis Oriental	10	Liberal	5
Misamis Oriental	10	Nacionalista	4
Misamis Oriental	10	Independent	1
Mountain Province	8	UNA	2
Mountain Province	8	Liberal	1
Mountain Province	8	Nacionalista	1
Mountain Province	8	Independent	4
Negros Occidental	12	NPC	6
Negros Occidental	12	Liberal	2
Negros Occidental	12	UNegA	2
Negros Occidental	12	NPC/UNegA	1
Negros Occidental	12	UNA	1
Negros Oriental	10	NPC	6
Negros Oriental	10	Liberal	4
Northern Samar	10	Liberal	6
Northern Samar	10	NUP	3
Northern Samar	10	NPC	1
Nueva Ecija	10	NPC/Balane	4
Nueva Ecija	10	Unang Sigaw	4
Nueva Ecija	10	Liberal	2
Nueva Vizcaya	10	Liberal	4
Nueva Vizcaya	10	Nacionalista	4
Nueva Vizcaya	10	UNA	2
Occidental Mindoro	10	Liberal	7
Occidental Mindoro	10	Lakas	2
Occidental Mindoro	10	Nacionalista	1
Oriental Mindoro	10	Liberal	7
Oriental Mindoro	10	Sandugo	2
Oriental Mindoro	10	NPC	1
Palawan	10	PPPL	6
Palawan	10	Liberal	4
Pampanga	10	Kambilan	7
Pampanga	10	Nacionalista	2
Pampanga	10	Independent	1
Pangasinan	12	NPC/Biskeg	8
Pangasinan	12	Liberal	3
Pangasinan	12	NPC	1
Quezon	10	NUP	5
Quezon	10	Liberal	3
Quezon	10	Nacionalista	1
Quezon	10	PMP	1
Quirino	8	Liberal	6
Quirino	8	PDP–Laban	1
Quirino	8	Independent	1
Rizal	10	NPC	5
Rizal	10	Liberal	4
Rizal	10	NUP	1
Romblon	8	Liberal	4
Romblon	8	Nacionalista	4
Samar	10	Liberal	6
Samar	10	NPC	2
Samar	10	Nacionalista	2
Sarangani	10	UNA/PCM	9
Sarangani	10	Liberal	1
Siquijor	6	Lakas	3
Siquijor	6	Liberal	3
Sorsogon	10	NPC	4
Sorsogon	10	Nacionalista	2
Sorsogon	10	UNA	1
Sorsogon	10	Independent	3
South Cotabato	10	NPC	5
South Cotabato	10	UNA	5
Southern Leyte	8	NUP	8
Sultan Kudarat	10	Liberal	2
Sultan Kudarat	10	UNA	1
Sultan Kudarat	10	Independent	7
Sulu	10	Liberal	10
Surigao del Norte	10	Liberal	7
Surigao del Norte	10	Nacionalista	2
Surigao del Norte	10	Padajon Surigao	1
Surigao del Sur	10	Liberal	7
Surigao del Sur	10	Lakas	1
Surigao del Sur	10	Nacionalista	1
Surigao del Sur	10	UNA	1
Tarlac	10	NPC	5
Tarlac	10	Nacionalista	2
Tarlac	10	Lakas	1
Tarlac	10	Liberal	1
Tarlac	10	PDP–Laban	1
Tawi-Tawi	8	Liberal	6
Tawi-Tawi	8	NPC	1
Tawi-Tawi	8	Independent	1
Zambales	10	SZP	6
Zambales	10	Liberal	1
Zambales	10	UNA	1
Zambales	10	Independent	2
Zamboanga del Norte	10	Liberal	7
Zamboanga del Norte	10	Nacionalista	2
Zamboanga del Norte	10	UNA	1
Zamboanga del Sur	10	NPC	10
Zamboanga Sibugay	10	Nacionalista	8
Zamboanga Sibugay	10	Liberal	1
Zamboanga Sibugay	10	Independent	1

== City and municipal-level elections ==
The executive and legislative branches of cities are modeled after provinces, with a mayor, vice mayor and a city or council made up of councilors. The city council has up to 36 regular members elected via plurality-at-large voting. Some cities are divided into councilor districts; if a city is divided into two or more congressional districts, the councilor districts would be coextensive with these. Some cities aren't divided into councilor districts; in cases such as this, the entire membership is elected at-large, with the city as one "district". Aside from these regular members, city councils also have two ex officio members composed of the president of the city chapters of the Association of Barangay (village) Captains (ABC) and of the Sangguniang Kabataan (SK; youth councils). These ex officio members are indirectly elected from the barangay level, which were elected by the people in 2010; an election later in the year may change the membership of those two ex officio members.

The executive and legislative branches of municipalities are modeled after cities, with the municipal councils being composed of eight (twelve in Pateros) regular members elected at-large. As with city councils, municipal councils have two ex officio members: one each from the municipal presidents of the Association of Barangay Captains, and of the Sangguniang Kabataan, all indirectly elected from the barangay level.

=== Mayoral elections ===
The following are the results of the mayoral elections in highly urbanized and independent component cities and independent municipalities by party:

Party	Seats
Liberal Party	15
United Nationalist Alliance	6
Nacionalista Party	4
Lakas–CMD	2
Hugpong sa Tawong Lungsod	1
Partido Magdiwang	1
Nationalist People's Coalition	1
Nationalist People's Coalition/Sulong Zambales Party	1
National Unity Party	1
Partido Abe Kapampangan	1
PDP–Laban	1
United Nationalist Alliance/Partido Navoteño	1
United Nationalist Alliance/People's Champ Movement	1
Independent	2
Total	38
Source: Commission on Elections

The following are the results of the mayoral elections in highly urbanized and independent component cities and independent municipalities:

City/Municipality	Elected mayor	Party
Angeles City	Edgardo Pamintuan Sr.	PAK
Bacolod	Monico Puentevella	Independent
Baguio	Mauricio Domogan	UNA
Butuan	Ferdinand Amante Jr.	Liberal
Cagayan de Oro	Oscar Moreno	Liberal
Caloocan	Oscar Malapitan	UNA
Cebu City	Mike Rama	UNA
Cotabato City	Japal Guiani Jr.	PDP–Laban
Dagupan	Belen Fernandez	Liberal
Davao City	Rodrigo Duterte	HTL
General Santos	Ronnel Rivera	UNA/PCM
Iligan	Celso Regencia	NUP
Iloilo City	Jed Patrick Mabilog	Liberal
Lapu-Lapu City	Paz Radaza	Lakas
Las Piñas	Vergel Aguilar	Nacionalista
Lucena	Roderick Alcala	Liberal
Makati	Jejomar Binay Jr.	UNA
Malabon	Antolin Oreta III	Liberal
Mandaluyong	Benhur Abalos	Lakas
Mandaue	Jonas Cortes	Liberal
Manila	Joseph Estrada	UNA
Marikina	Del de Guzman	Liberal
Muntinlupa	Jaime Fresnedi	Liberal
Naga	John Bongat	Liberal
Navotas	John Rey Tiangco	UNA/Navoteño
Olongapo	Rolen Paulino	NPC/SZP
Ormoc	Edward Codilla	Independent
Parañaque	Edwin Olivarez	Liberal
Pasay	Antonino Calixto	Liberal
Pasig	Maribel Eusebio	Nacionalista
Pateros	Jaime Medina	Nacionalista
Puerto Princesa	Lucilo Bayron	UNA
Quezon City	Herbert Bautista	Liberal
San Juan	Guia Gomez	Magdiwang
Santiago	Joseph Tan	Liberal
Taguig	Lani Cayetano	Nacionalista
Valenzuela	Rex Gatchalian	NPC
Zamboanga City	Beng Climaco	Liberal

=== Vice mayoral elections ===
The following are the results of the vice mayoral elections in highly urbanized and independent component cities and independent municipalities by party:

Party	Seats
Liberal Party	13
United Nationalist Alliance	6
Nacionalista Party	5
Bagumbayan–VNP	1
Hugpong sa Tawong Lungsod	1
Lakas–CMD	1
Laban ng Demokratikong Pilipino	1
Partido Magdiwang	1
Nationalist People's Coalition	1
National Unity Party	1
Partido Abe Kapampangan	1
PDP–Laban	1
Pwersa ng Masang Pilipino	1
United Nationalist Alliance/Partido Navoteño	1
United Nationalist Alliance/People's Champ Movement	1
Independent	2
Total	38
Source: Commission on Elections

The following are the results of the vice mayoral elections in highly urbanized and independent component cities and independent municipalities:

City/Municipality	Elected vice mayor	Party
Angeles City	Vicky Vega	PAK
Bacolod	Greg Gasataya	NPC
Baguio	Daniel Fariñas	Nacionalista
Butuan	Angelo Victor Calo	Liberal
Cagayan de Oro	Caesar Ian Acenas	Nacionalista
Caloocan	Macario Asistio III	PMP
Cebu City	Edgardo Labella	UNA
Cotabato City	Abdullah Andang	PDP–Laban
Dagupan	Marc Brian Lim	Nacionalista
Davao City	Paolo Duterte	HTL
General Santos	Shirlyn Bañas-Nograles	UNA/PCM
Iligan	Ruderic Marzo	Liberal
Iloilo City	Jose Espinosa III	NUP
Lapu-Lapu City	Marcial Ycong	Lakas
Las Piñas	Luis Bustamante	Nacionalista
Lucena	Philip Castillo	Liberal
Makati	Kid Peña	Liberal
Malabon	Jeannie Sandoval	UNA
Mandaluyong	Edward Bartolome	Liberal
Mandaue	Glenn Bercede	Liberal
Manila	Isko Moreno	UNA
Marikina	Jose Fabian Cadiz	Liberal
Muntinlupa	Artemio Simundac	UNA
Naga	Nelson Legacion	Liberal
Navotas	Clint Geronimo	UNA/Navoteño
Olongapo	Rodel Cerezo	Bagumbayan–VNP
Ormoc	Leo Carmelo Locsin Jr.	Liberal
Parañaque	Jose Enrico Golez	UNA
Pasay	Marlon Pesebre	UNA
Pasig	Iyo Bernardo	Independent
Pateros	Gerald German	Liberal
Puerto Princesa	Luis Marcaida III	Independent
Quezon City	Joy Belmonte	Liberal
San Juan	Francis Zamora	Magdiwang
Santiago	Marcelino Cabucana Jr.	Liberal
Taguig	Ading Cruz	Nacionalista
Valenzuela	Eric Martinez	Liberal
Zamboanga City	Cesar Iturralde	LDP

=== City and municipal council elections ===
The following are the results of the city and municipal council elections in highly urbanized and independent component cities and independent municipalities by party:

Party	Seats
Liberal Party	184
United Nationalist Alliance	93
Nacionalista Party	69
Nationalist People's Coalition	30
Lakas–CMD	21
Hugpong sa Tawong Lungsod	19
United Nationalist Alliance/Partido Navoteño	12
Partido Magdiwang	11
Laban ng Demokratikong Pilipino	8
Bagumbayan–VNP	7
Partido Abe Kapampangan	7
PDP–Laban	6
United Nationalist Alliance/People's Champ Movement	6
Achievers with Integrity Movement	5
Liberal Party/Ugyon	3
Pwersa ng Masang Pilipino	3
National Unity Party	2
Aksyon Demokratiko	1
Adelante Zamboanga Party	1
Centrist Democratic Party	1
Kabalikat ng Bayan sa Kaunlaran	1
Kilusang Diwa ng Taguig	1
Liberal Party/Sulong Zambales Party	1
Nacionalista Party/Sulong Zambales Party	1
People's Champ Movement	1
Independent	32
Total	526
Source: Commission on Elections

The totals do not include sectoral and reserved seats.

The following are the results of the city and municipal council elections in highly urbanized and independent component cities and independent municipalities:

City/municipality	Elected seats	Party	Seats won
Angeles City	10	PAK	7
Angeles City	10	Lakas	2
Angeles City	10	NPC	1
Bacolod	12	Liberal	5
Bacolod	12	NPC	3
Bacolod	12	Nacionalista	2
Bacolod	12	Independent	2
Baguio	12	Liberal	4
Baguio	12	Nacionalista	4
Baguio	12	UNA	2
Baguio	12	NUP	1
Baguio	12	Independent	1
Butuan	10	Liberal	7
Butuan	10	Lakas	1
Butuan	10	Independent	2
Cagayan de Oro	16	Nacionalista	5
Cagayan de Oro	16	UNA	5
Cagayan de Oro	16	Liberal	4
Cagayan de Oro	16	PDP–Laban	1
Cagayan de Oro	16	Independent	1
Caloocan	12	Liberal	6
Caloocan	12	UNA	5
Caloocan	12	Independent	1
Cebu City	16	Liberal	12
Cebu City	16	UNA	4
Cotabato City	10	Liberal	6
Cotabato City	10	PDP–Laban	4
Dagupan	10	Liberal	6
Dagupan	10	Nacionalista	4
Davao City	24	HTL	19
Davao City	24	Liberal	3
Davao City	24	NPC	1
Davao City	24	NUP	1
General Santos	12	UNA/PCM	6
General Santos	12	AIM	5
General Santos	12	PCM	1
Iligan	12	Liberal	8
Iligan	12	Nacionalista	1
Iligan	12	CDP	1
Iligan	12	Independent	2
Iloilo City	12	Liberal	4
Iloilo City	12	Liberal/Ugyon	3
Iloilo City	12	PMP	1
Iloilo City	12	Independent	4
Lapu-Lapu City	12	Lakas	12
Las Piñas	12	Nacionalista	12
Lucena	10	Liberal	6
Lucena	10	NPC	2
Lucena	10	UNA	2
Makati	16	UNA	16
Malabon	12	Liberal	8
Malabon	12	Nacionalista	1
Malabon	12	NPC	1
Malabon	12	UNA	1
Malabon	12	Independent	1
Mandaluyong	12	Lakas	4
Mandaluyong	12	Liberal	4
Mandaluyong	12	NPC	2
Mandaluyong	12	UNA	1
Mandaluyong	12	Independent	1
Mandaue	10	Liberal	10
Manila	36	UNA	24
Manila	36	Liberal	7
Manila	36	Kabaka	1
Manila	36	Nacionalista	1
Manila	36	Independent	3
Marikina	16	Liberal	15
Marikina	16	PMP	1
Muntinlupa	16	UNA	13
Muntinlupa	16	Liberal	3
Naga	10	Liberal	10
Navotas	12	UNA/Navoteño	12
Olongapo	10	Bagumbayan–VNP	7
Olongapo	10	Liberal/SZP	1
Olongapo	10	Nacionalista/SZP	1
Olongapo	10	Independent	1
Ormoc	10	Liberal	6
Ormoc	10	Independent	4
Parañaque	16	UNA	10
Parañaque	16	Liberal	5
Parañaque	16	PMP	1
Pasay	12	Liberal	8
Pasay	12	UNA	3
Pasay	12	Independent	1
Pasig	12	Nacionalista	10
Pasig	12	Liberal	1
Pasig	12	Independent	1
Pateros	12	Nacionalista	8
Pateros	12	Liberal	3
Pateros	12	Independent	1
Puerto Princesa	10	NPC	7
Puerto Princesa	10	Liberal	3
Quezon City	36	Liberal	27
Quezon City	36	NPC	2
Quezon City	36	UNA	2
Quezon City	36	Nacionalista	1
Quezon City	36	PDP–Laban	1
Quezon City	36	Independent	3
San Juan	12	Magdiwang	11
San Juan	12	UNA	1
Santiago	10	Nacionalista	5
Santiago	10	NPC	2
Santiago	10	Aksyon	1
Santiago	10	Liberal	1
Santiago	10	Independent	1
Taguig	16	Nacionalista	15
Taguig	16	KDT	1
Valenzuela	12	NPC	8
Valenzuela	12	Lakas	2
Valenzuela	12	Liberal	1
Valenzuela	12	UNA	1
Zamboanga City	16	LDP	8
Zamboanga City	16	UNA	3
Zamboanga City	16	AZAP	1
Zamboanga City	16	Liberal	1
Zamboanga City	16	NPC	1
Zamboanga City	16	Independent	2

== Barangay-level elections ==
Elections for barangay level were held in October 2013. Each barangay has a chairman and seven kagawads (councilors) elected at large.

== Elections by locality ==
- Gubernatorial elections (list)

By locality:

- Batangas
  - Lipa
- Bohol
- Bukidnon
  - Valencia
- Bulacan
  - Bocaue
- Cavite
  - Dasmariñas
  - Imus
- Cebu
- Laguna
  - Biñan
  - Cabuyao
  - Calamba
  - San Pablo
  - San Pedro
  - Santa Rosa
- Iligan
- Metro Manila
  - Caloocan
  - Makati
  - Manila
  - Marikina
  - Navotas
  - Quezon City
  - Taguig
  - Valenzuela
- Quezon
- Sarangani
- Zamboanga City

== Campaign ==
For April 14 weekend, Catholic Bishops Conference of the Philippines' Vice President Archbishop Socrates Villegas instructed priests to tell their flock during mass "not to vote for the candidate if the candidate cannot declare a categorical and clear 'no' to divorce, abortion, euthanasia, total birth control and homosexual marriages or death issues." This was seen as a setback for President Benigno Aquino's allies who had passed a birth control law the previous year.

== See also ==
- Commission on Elections
