= 2013 Sarangani local elections =

Philippine election

2013 Sarangani gubernatorial election
- May 13, 2013
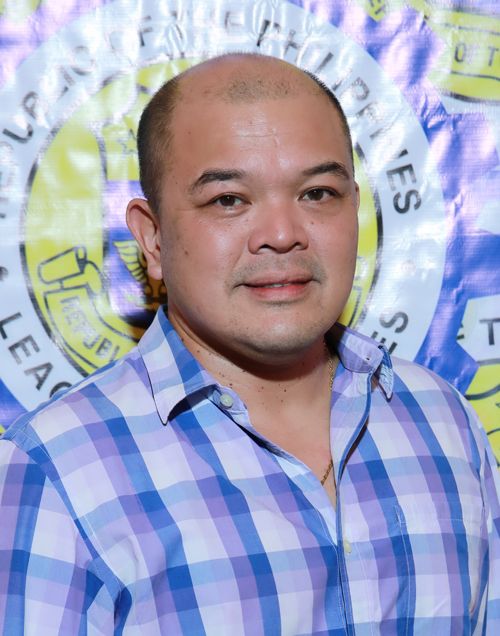
Nominee	Steve Solon
Party	UNA/PCM
Running mate	Jinkee Pacquiao
Popular vote	133,175
Percentage	100.00
Governor before election
Miguel Rene Dominguez
LP/SARRO
Elected Governor
Steve Solon
UNA/PCM

Local elections were held in Sarangani on May 13, 2013, within the Philippine general election. Voters selected candidates for all local positions: a town mayor, vice mayor and town councilors, as well as members of the Sangguniang Panlalawigan, the vice-governor, governor and a representative for the lone district of Sarangani. Incumbent governor Miguel Rene Dominguez was barred for seeking another term because of the three-term limit for governors.

== Background ==
On September 9, 2011, although allowed to seek another term, Filipino eight-division world boxing champion and incumbent Representative Manny Pacquiao announced his intention to run for governor. He also announced that he will trade positions with incumbent governor Miguel Rene Dominguez who was completing his third term and was not allowed to seek another term.

On April 14, 2012, Pacquiao left the Liberal Party and joined the PDP–Laban. Pacquiao became a member of the Liberal Party faction of then Manila Mayor Lito Atienza. He then ran for representative of the 1st District of South Cotabato. However, he lost to then representative and incumbent General Santos mayor Darlene Antonino-Custodio. He then joined the Kabalikat ng Malayang Pilipino of then President Gloria Macapagal Arroyo. In 2010, he ran again as representative of the lone district of Sarangani under the People's Champ Movement which is affiliated with the Nacionalista Party and won over the Chiongbian clan. He then moved to Liberal Party along with other elected representatives.

On October 2, 2012, Pacquiao decided to run for reelection as representative of Sarangani. His wife, Jinkee Pacquiao filed her candidacy for vice governor. She is the running mate of incumbent vice governor Steve Solon.

== Provincial Elections ==
The candidates for governor and vice governor with the highest number of votes wins the seat; they are voted separately, therefore, they may be of different parties when elected.

=== Candidates for Governor ===
Parties are as stated in their certificate of candidacies.

Sarangani gubernatorial election
Party	Candidate	Votes	%
UNA	Steve Solon	133,175	100.00
Total votes		133,175	100.00
UNA gain from SARRO			

=== Candidates for Vice Governor ===
Parties are as stated in their certificate of candidacies.

Sarangani vice gubernatorial election
Party	Candidate	Votes	%
UNA	Jinkee Pacquiao	134,192	
Liberal	Eleonor Saguiguit	27,989	
Independent	Jose Elorde Villamor	5,176	
Total votes			
UNA gain from SARRO			

=== Congressional elections ===
Sarangani's lone legislative district will elect a representative to the House of Representatives. The candidate with the highest number of votes wins the seat.

Eight-division world boxing champion and incumbent Manny Pacquiao is running unopposed.

2013 Philippine House of Representatives election at Sarangani
Party	Candidate	Votes	%
UNA	Manny Pacquiao	149,135	100.00
Total votes		149,135	100.00
UNA hold			

=== Sangguniang Panlalawigan elections ===
All 2 Districts of Sarangani will elect Sangguniang Panlalawigan or provincial board members.

==== 1st District (West Coast) ====
- Municipalities: Kiamba, Maitum, Maasim

Parties are as stated in their certificate of candidacies.

Sarangani 1st District Sangguniang Panlalawigan election
Party	Candidate	Votes	%
UNA	Elmer De Peralta	26,618	
UNA	Alexander Bryan Reganit	22,482	
UNA	Cornelio Martinez, Jr.	20,622	
Liberal	George Falgui	15,445	
UNA	Manuelito Jabilles	14,393	
Liberal	Hanafi Ibrahim	12,996	
Independent	Pirot Manguigin	6,447	
Liberal	Jose Lim	5,297	
Independent	Jundam Malges	2,942	
Total votes			

==== 2nd District (East Coast) ====
- Municipalities: Alabel, Glan, Sarangani, Malapatan, Malungon

Parties are as stated in their certificate of candidacies.

Sarangani 2nd District Sangguniang Panlalawigan election
Party	Candidate	Votes	%
UNA	Eugene Alzate	53,754	
UNA	Hermie Galzote	45,937	
UNA	Virgilio Tobias	42,436	
UNA	Arman Guili	36,421	
UNA	Abdulracman Pangolima	34,579	
UNA	Cesar Nallos, Jr.	32,331	
Liberal	Norberto Butiong	27,260	
Liberal	Menandro Dambong	24,132	
Liberal	Norberto La Paz	16,346	
Independent	Restituto Lantingan	13,340	
Liberal	Efraim Englis	12,865	
Total votes			

== Mayoralty Election ==
All municipalities of Sarangani will elect mayor and vice-mayor this election. The candidates for mayor and vice mayor with the highest number of votes wins the seat; they are voted separately, therefore, they may be of different parties when elected. Below is the list of mayoralty candidates of each city and municipalities per district.

=== 1st District, Candidates for Mayor ===
- Municipalities: Kiamba, Maasim, Maitum

==== Kiamba ====
Kiamba mayoralty election
Party	Candidate	Votes	%
UNA	Raul Martinez		
Liberal	Rommel Tomas Falgui		
Total votes			

Kiamba vice mayoralty election
Party	Candidate	Votes	%
UNA	Danny Martinez		
Independent	James Solomon Pimentel		
Independent	Regino Valle		
Total votes			

==== Maasim ====
Maasim mayoralty election
Party	Candidate	Votes	%
UNA	Aniceto Lopez, Jr.		
PMP	Jose Zamorro		
Liberal	Arturo Lawa		
Total votes			

Maasim vice mayoralty election
Party	Candidate	Votes	%
UNA	Uttoh Salem Cutan		
PMP	Geofray Carnala		
Total votes			

==== Maitum ====
Maitum mayoralty election
Party	Candidate	Votes	%
UNA	George Perret		
Nacionalista	Tito Balazon, Sr.		
Total votes			

Maitum vice mayoralty election
Party	Candidate	Votes	%
UNA	Pepito Catimbang		
Nacionalista	Limuel Gacula, Sr.		
Total votes			

=== 2nd District ===
- Municipalities: Alabel, Glan, Malapatan, Malungon

==== Alabel ====
Alabel mayoralty election
Party	Candidate	Votes	%
UNA	Corazon Grafilo		
Total votes			
UNA hold			

Alabel vice mayoralty election
Party	Candidate	Votes	%
UNA	Vic Paul Salarda		
Total votes			
UNA hold			

==== Glan ====
Glan mayoralty election
Party	Candidate	Votes	%
UNA	Victor James Yap, Sr.		
Liberal	Enrique Yap, Jr.		
Independent	Arsenio Corsame Jr.		
Total votes			

Glan vice mayoralty election
Party	Candidate	Votes	%
UNA	Vivien Yap		
Independent	Ricardo Roque		
Total votes			

==== Malapatan ====
Malapatan mayoralty election
Party	Candidate	Votes	%
UNA	Alfonso Singcoy, Sr.		
Total votes			
UNA hold			

Malapatan vice mayoralty election
Party	Candidate	Votes	%
UNA	Jimmy Bagit		
Total votes			
UNA hold			

==== Malungon ====
Malungon mayoralty election
Party	Candidate	Votes	%
UNA	Reynaldo Constantino		
Independent	Julian Niñeza		
Total votes			

Malungon vice mayoralty election
Party	Candidate	Votes	%
Independent	Erwin Asgapo		
UNA	Jessie Dela Cruz		
Total votes			
