= 2013 Iligan local elections =

Philippine election

Iligan City Mayoralty Elections, 2013
← 2010	May 13, 2013	2016 →
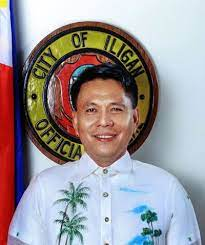
Nominee	Celso Regencia	Henry Dy	Franklin Quijano
Party	NUP	Liberal	Independent
Running mate	Leo Zaragosa	Ruderic Marzo	Benny Badelles
Popular vote	43,586	32,194	12,413
Percentage	44.43	38.16	14.71
Nominee	Giovanni Encabo	Aurelio Bandanillo	Ismael Joel Naga, Jr.
Party	Independent	Independent	PDSP
Popular vote	1,689	175	169
Percentage	2.00	0.21	0.20
Nominee	Samuel Acut	Datu Ismail Malangas	Yuri Taongan
Party	Independent	Independent	Independent
Popular vote	111	72	64
Percentage	0.13	0.09	0.08
Mayor before election
Lawrence Lluch Cruz
Liberal
Elected mayor
Celso Regencia
NUP

Local elections held in Iligan City on May 13, 2013 within the Philippine general election. The resident voters elected for the elective local posts in the city: the mayor, vice mayor, the one congressman, and twelve councilors. Each official is elected publicly to a 3-year term and can be re-elected up to 3 terms in succession.

At the last of voter's registration last October 2012, the city has accumulated a total of 138,744 registered voters. Registered voters of the city no longer vote for provincial candidates such as the Governor and Vice Governor unlike its nearby towns. In 2010, through Republic Act 9724, Iligan City separated from the First District of Lanao del Norte.

Lawrence Lluch Cruz is the incumbent on his third consecutive term. Thus, he is prohibited to run due to term limits. Instead, Cruz's tandem and incumbent vice-mayor Henry Dy was challenged by the two other popular candidates, retired Colonel Celso Regencia and former mayor Franklin Quijano .

On May 14, 2013, Celso Regencia and Ruderic Marzo were proclaimed newly elected city mayor and vice-mayor of the city by the Board of Canvassers.

== Results for Lone District Representative ==
Vicente "Varf" Belmonte, Jr. is the incumbent.

2013 Philippine House of Representatives election in Iligan
Party	Candidate	Votes	%
Liberal	Vicente Belmonte, Jr.	59,591	73.83
PMP	Uriel Borja	10,196	12.63
Independent	Samson Dajao	9,034	11.19
NUP	Jose Noel Arquiza	1,138	1.41
Independent	Joe Booc	566	0.70
Independent	Alberto Ora	185	0.23
Total votes		89,083	100.00
Liberal gain from PMP			

== Results for Mayor ==
Iligan City Mayoralty Election
Party	Candidate	Votes	%
NUP	Celso Regencia	43,586	44.43
Liberal	Henry Dy	32,194	38.16
Independent	Franklin Quijano	12,413	14.71
Independent	Giovanni Encabo	1,689	2.00
Independent	Aurelio Bandanillo	175	0.21
PDSP	Ismael Joel Naga, Jr.	169	0.20
Independent	Samuel Acut	111	0.13
Independent	Datu Ismail Malangas	72	0.09
Independent	Yuri Taongan	64	0.08
Total votes		90,409	100.00
NUP gain from Liberal			

== Results for Vice-Mayor ==
Iligan City Vice-Mayoralty Election
Party	Candidate	Votes	%
Liberal	Ruderic Marzo	41,110	40.43
PMP	Bernard Pacaña	22,391	27.33
NUP	Leo Zaragosa	18,650	22.76
Independent	Bienvenido Badelles	5,675	6.93
Independent	Reynaldo Mancia	1,880	2.29
Independent	Voltaire Lluch	217	0.26
Total votes		89,083	100.00
Liberal gain from PMP			

== Results for City Councilors ==
2013 Iligan City Council Elections
Party	Candidate	Votes	%
Liberal	Providencio Abragan, Jr.	56,878	5.66
NUP	Marlene Young	53,492	5.33
Independent	Simplicio Larrazabal III	50,831	5.03
Liberal	Frederick Siao	49,969	5.03
Liberal	Michelle Echavez Sweet	45,489	4.51
CDP	Emmanuel Salibay	38,391	3.88
Liberal	Ariel Anghay	38,238	3.70
Liberal	Roy Openiano	37,960	3.78
Independent	Samuel Huertas	34,234	3.51
Liberal	Bayani Areola	33,576	3.28
Liberal	Usafeno Obial	32,758	3.31
Liberal	Alfredo Busico	32,324	3.19
Liberal	Jose Zalsos	26,272	3.17
Liberal	Orlando Maglinao	26,221	3.16
Independent	Rejoice Subejano	25,620	3.11
NUP	Belinda Lim	24,043	2.92
NUP	Immanuel Cabili	23,583	2.86
NUP	Demosthenes Plando	22,075	2.86
NUP	Jose Maria Boza	20,781	2.52
Independent	Gina Sue Hilda Cruz	20,082	2.44
PMP	Vic Ramon Bueno	17,729	2.15
Independent	Dizon Ducay, Jr.	17,394	2.11
Liberal	Noel Magaro	16,988	2.06
NUP	Loreto Tecson II	14,523	1.76
Independent	Livey Villarin	14,315	1.74
NUP	Raquel Paran-Malaluan	12,951	1.57
Independent	Felito Haim	12,528	1.52
NUP	Voltaire Rovira	12,243	1.49
Independent	Antonietta Bona	10,470	1.27
NUP	Severo Eduardo Yap	10,457	1.27
Independent	Jules Verne Padilla	9,764	1.19
Independent	Lorenzo Pendang	9,447	1.19
Independent	Ma. Josefa Labaro	6,788	0.82
PMP	Antonio Flores	5,672	0.69
Independent	Norberto Altres	5,658	0.69
Makabayan	Charles Raiñer Marquez	5,653	0.64
NUP	Alejandro Yañez	5,279	0.64
Independent	Severino Madlangbayan, Jr.	5,268	0.64
PMP	Rodel Ocaña	5,151	0.63
Independent	Bienvenido Mansumayan	4,617	0.56
Independent	Jose Mari Buenaventura	4,427	0.54
Independent	Rogelio Pagarigan	3,763	0.46
PDSP	Michael Eric Echiverri	3,069	0.37
PDSP	Jude Andrew Lluch	1,864	0.23
Independent	Alan Amantiad	1,722	0.21
PDSP	Romeo Sumalinog	1,467	0.18
Independent	Elizer Escalona	1,415	0.17
PDSP	Wilbur Tom Burgos	1,180	0.14
Independent	Arsenio Liaging	484	0.06
Total votes		89,083	100.00
Liberal gain from NUP			
