= 2013 Calamba local election =

2013 Calamba mayoral election
- May 13, 2013
Nominee	Justin Marc SB. Chipeco	Severino Lajara	Joel Paner
Party	Nacionalista	PDP–Laban	Makabayan
Running mate	Roseller Rizal	Angelito Lazaro, Jr.
Popular vote	66,802	63,145	4,676
Percentage	49.54%	46.82%	3.47%
Mayor before election
Joaquin Chipeco, Jr.
Liberal
Elected mayor
Justin Marc SB. Chipeco
Nacionalista

Local elections were held in Calamba, Laguna, on May 13, 2013, within the Philippine general election, for posts of the mayor, vice mayor and ten councillors.

== Overview ==
The incumbent mayor, Joaquin "Jun" Chipeco, Jr., decided to run for the position of representative of the 2nd District of Laguna under the Liberal Party. His son, Justin Marc SB Chipeco, the incumbent Laguna's 2nd district representative ran for mayor of Calamba under Nacionalista Party. His opponent was the former vice-mayor Severino Lajara under PDP-Laban.

== Results ==
The candidates for mayor and vice mayor with the highest number of votes win. They are voted for separately. Therefore, they may be of different parties when elected.

=== Mayoral and vice mayoral elections ===
Calamba mayoralty election
Party	Candidate	Votes	%
Nacionalista	Justin Marc Chipeco	66,802	47.44
PDP–Laban	Severino Lajara	63,145	44.84
Makabayan	Joel Paner	4,676	3.32
Independent	Lito Teves	234	0.17
Margin of victory		3,657	2.60%
Invalid or blank votes		5,966	4.23
Total votes		140,823	100.00

Calamba vice mayoralty election
Party	Candidate	Votes	%
Nacionalista	Roseller Rizal	67,278	47.77
PDP–Laban	Angelito Lazaro, Jr.	58,078	41.23
Margin of victory		9,200	6.53%
Invalid or blank votes		15,490	11.00
Total votes		140,846	100.00

=== City Council elections ===
Party	Votes	%	Seats
Nacionalista Party	622,390	62.03	7
PDP–Laban	368,028	36.68	3
Independent	12,907	1.29	0
Ex officio seats			2
Total	1,003,325	100.00	12

Voters elected ten councilors to comprise the City Council or the Sangguniang Panlungsod. Candidates are voted for separately so winning candidates may come from different political parties. The ten candidates with the highest number of votes win the seats.

2013 Calamba City Council
Party	Candidate	Votes	%
Nacionalista	Edgardo H. Catindig	91,967	9.17
Nacionalista	Ruth M. Hernandez	86,823	8.65
Nacionalista	Moises E. Morales	79,119	7.89
PDP–Laban	Peewee P. Perez	71,938	7.17
Nacionalista	Leeanne P. Aldabe	70,490	7.03
PDP–Laban	Christian Niño S. Lajara	67,410	6.72
Nacionalista	Luis Vergel G. Baroro	61,884	6.17
PDP–Laban	Maria Virginia A. Alcasid	61,083	6.09
Nacionalista	Jose Morel DC Manaig	56,200	5.60
Nacionalista	Santiago O. Atienza	50,556	5.04
Nacionalista	Juan C. Lazaro	48,015	4.79
Nacionalista	Jane B. Varona	38,855	3.87
Nacionalista	Dexter A. Bathan	38,481	3.84
PDP–Laban	Miriam P. Manalo	38,085	3.80
PDP–Laban	Kerwin O. Piamonte	28,541	2.84
PDP–Laban	Rolando P. Baliao	27,674	2.76
PDP–Laban	Hermogenes M. Miranda	21,775	2.17
PDP–Laban	Nicasio A. Lacerna	20,420	2.04
PDP–Laban	Esmeraldo P. Plastina	18,598	1.85
Independent	Emerson S. Panganiban	12,907	1.29
PDP–Laban	Roosevelt Q. Legaspi	12,504	1.25
Total votes		1,000,325	100

== Protests ==
Supporters of the mayoral candidate Severino Lajara stormed city hall to protest against the suspension of the canvassing votes. They believed the results of the elections were being manipulated.

The mayoral race in Calamba was neck and neck between Lajara and Chipeco. Police kept a close watch on the Commission on Elections (Comelec) office in Calamba.
