= 2013 Dasmariñas local elections =

- May 13, 2013
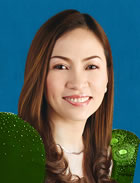
Nominee	Jenny Barzaga	Gavino Mercado
Party	NUP	Lakas
Running mate	Vale Encabo	Antonio "Damo" Ferrer
Popular vote	127,678	26,712
Mayor before election
Jenny Barzaga
NUP
Elected mayor
Jenny Barzaga
NUP

Local elections were held in the city of Dasmariñas on May 13, 2013 together with the national and provincial level elections. Since Dasmariñas is a component city in the province of Cavite, it may elect a provincial official despite its own representation in the congress.

== Background ==
Since 1998, Barzagas have dominated in the elections. Their allies have also won several positions in the city/municipal council. In 2010, the Barzagas were members of Lakas-Kampi-CMD supporting Gilbert Teodoro, who lost to Benigno Aquino III of the Liberal Party. When the 15th Congress of the Philippines started, Pidi became a member of the majority group of Feliciano Belmonte. The following year his faction from Lakas-Kampi established the new party, National Unity Party.

This 2013, Pidi Barzaga and his wife Jenny is running for their last term for congressman and mayor, respectively, together with Vice Mayor Valeriano "Vale" Encabo. Although they are running under the National Unity Party, they are also nominated by the Liberal Party due to electoral alliance with Rep. Ayong Maliksi, the alliance called as Team Dasma.

Meanwhile, last term Councilor Gavino "Gabby" Mercado, former Barzaga's allied, are still with the Lakas party, and in alliance with Gov. Jonvic Remulla and Jolo Revilla, is running for mayor along with Miguelito "Mike" Ilano who was lost for board member of 4th district in 2010, is running for congressman. The Mercado group known as the Amazing 16 which included Remulla and Revilla in the coalition.

== Congress ==
Elpidio "Pidi" Barzaga is the incumbent. Although he is running under the National Unity Party, he is also nominated by the Liberal Party.

Philippine House of Representatives election at Cavite's 4th district
Party	Candidate	Votes	%
NUP	Elpidio Barzaga, Jr.	165,604	87.42
Lakas	Miguel Ilano	23,836	12.58
Total votes		189,440	100.00
NUP hold			

== Provincial Board ==
Although Dasmariñas is a large city not only in Calabarzon region but also in the entire Southern Luzon in terms of income and population, however, it is still not an independent city, and is still in the jurisdiction of the Province of Cavite (4th district) thus it can allow its people to run in and elect to the provincial positions. Incumbent Board Members Teofilo Rudy Lara and Raul Rex Mangubat, both from NUP and Liberal Party are the two candidates to the post of provincial board members. No other opponents are running.

Cavite 4th District Sangguniang Panlalawigan election
Party	Candidate	Votes	%
NUP	Teofilo Lara	101,132	51.04
NUP	Rex Mangubat	97,019	48.96
Total votes		165,190	100

== Mayoral ==
=== Mayor ===
Jenny Barzaga is the incumbent, running against incumbent City Councilor Gavino "Gabby" Mercado, who is in his last term.

Dasmariñas mayoralty election
Party	Candidate	Votes	%
NUP	Jenny Barzaga	127,678	
Lakas	Gavino Mercado	26,712	
PMP	Maria Lourdes Garcia	1,335	
Total votes			

=== Vice Mayor ===
Valeriano "Vale" Encabo is the incumbent. He will oppose Liga ng mga Barangay President and Brgy. Fatima III Chairman Antonio "Damo" Ferrer (namesake of Cavite Rep. Antonio Ferrer, who is running for Mayor of neighboring General Trias).

Dasmariñas vice mayoralty election
Party	Candidate	Votes	%
NUP	Valeriano Encabo	105,718	73.81
Lakas	Antonio "Damo" Ferrer	37,520	26.19
Total votes			

== City Council ==
Election in the city council is at large at 12 seats on the line. Some candidates from Lakas–CMD are considered as independent because they did not submit their certificate of nomination from their party. 28 people are running, 8 of them are incumbent, all from Team Dasma (NUP/LP) coalition. All 12 candidates of Team Dasma are won.

Term limited candidates are the following:

- Gavino Mercado – running for Mayor under Lakas–CMD and United Nationalist Alliance
- Francisco Barreto – served as campaign manager for Team Dasma
- Cecilio Dedase, Jr.
- Hermigildo Mendoza

=== Candidates ===
==== Administration coalition (Team Dasma/Team Jenny) ====
Liberal Party/National Unity Party (Team Jenny)
Name	Party	Result
Peter Tom Antonio	NUP	won
Roderick "Erik" Atineza	NUP	won
Nicanor "Nickol" Austria, Jr.	NUP	won
Teofilo "Pilo" Campaño	NUP	won
Reynaldo "Rey" Canaynay	NUP	won
Robin Chester Cantimbuhan[A]	Liberal	won
Fulgencio "Jun"de la Cuesta, Jr.	NUP	won
Restituto "Resty" Encabo	NUP	won
Jacinto "Jess" Frani, Jr.	NUP	won
Napoleon "Toyen" Gonzales	NUP	won
Angelo "Eloy" Hugo	NUP	won
Tagumpay "Pay" Tapawan M.D.	NUP	won

==== Opposition coalition (Amazing 16/Team Gabby) ====
Lakas–CMD (Team Gabby)
Name	Party	Result
Ernesto "JonJon" Avendano, Jr.	Lakas	lost
Naomi de Leon	Lakas	lost
Arnel Del Rosario[B]	Nacionalista	lost
Virgilio "Boyet" Delfin	Lakas	lost
Romeo "Romy" Escaros	Lakas	lost
Fernando "Ando" Laudato	Lakas	lost
Glen Malihan	Lakas	lost
Tomasito "Tommy" Martinez	Lakas	lost
Nemencio "Nemie" Morales	Lakas	lost
Virgilio "Ver" Ortega	Lakas	lost
Rogelio "Rowell" Ramales	Lakas	lost

==== Independent candidates not in tickets ====
Name	Party	Result
Roche Avila	Independent	lost
Roden Carungcong	Independent	lost
John Dacaymat	Independent	lost
Vic Rustia	Independent	lost
Norma Salcedo	Independent	lost

Notes

- A* Cantimbuhan is belatedly nominated by the Liberal Party; he is indicated as a National Unity Party on the ballot.
- B* del Rosario is also belatedly nominated by the Nacionalista Party; he is also indicated as a Lakas–CMD on the ballot.

=== Results ===
Dasmariñas Council election
Party	Candidate	Votes	%
Liberal	Robin Cantimbuhan	102,867	7.15
NUP	Reynaldo Canaynay	99,159	6.89
NUP	Resty Encabo	92,961	6.46
NUP	Jacinto Frani Jr.	86,652	6.02
NUP	Roderick Atienza Sr.	85,806	5.96
NUP	Peter Tom Antonio	80,965	5.63
NUP	Nickol Austria	80,483	5.59
NUP	Tagumpay Tapawan	78,936	5.49
NUP	Fulgencio Dela Cuesta Jr.	76,055	5.29
NUP	Teofilo Campano	75,515	5.25
NUP	Napoleon Gonzales	71,649	4.98
NUP	Eloy Hugo	60,288	4.19
Nacionalista	Arnel Del Rosario	41,860	2.91
Lakas	Kap Nemie Morales	38,985	2.71
Lakas	Fernando Laudato	37,230	2.59
Lakas	Ernesto Avendano Jr.	36,898	2.56
Lakas	Tomasito Martinez	35,369	2.46
Lakas	Naomi De Leon	32,470	2.26
Independent	Denden Carungcong	31,980	2.22
Lakas	Glenn Malihan	31,786	2.21
Lakas	Virgilio Ortega	30,291	2.11
Lakas	Virgilio Delfin	28,122	1.95
Lakas	Romy Escarios	24,841	1.73
Lakas	Rogelio Ramales	24,477	1.70
Independent	Vic Rustia	16,055	1.12
Independent	Norma Salcedo	15,470	1.08
Independent	John Dacaymat	11,230	0.78
Independent	Roche Avila	10,508	0.73
Invalid or blank votes			
Total votes			
