= Glan, Sarangani =

Municipality in Sarangani, Philippines

Glan
- Municipality
- Municipality of Glan

Other transcription(s)
  - Jawi: ڠلن
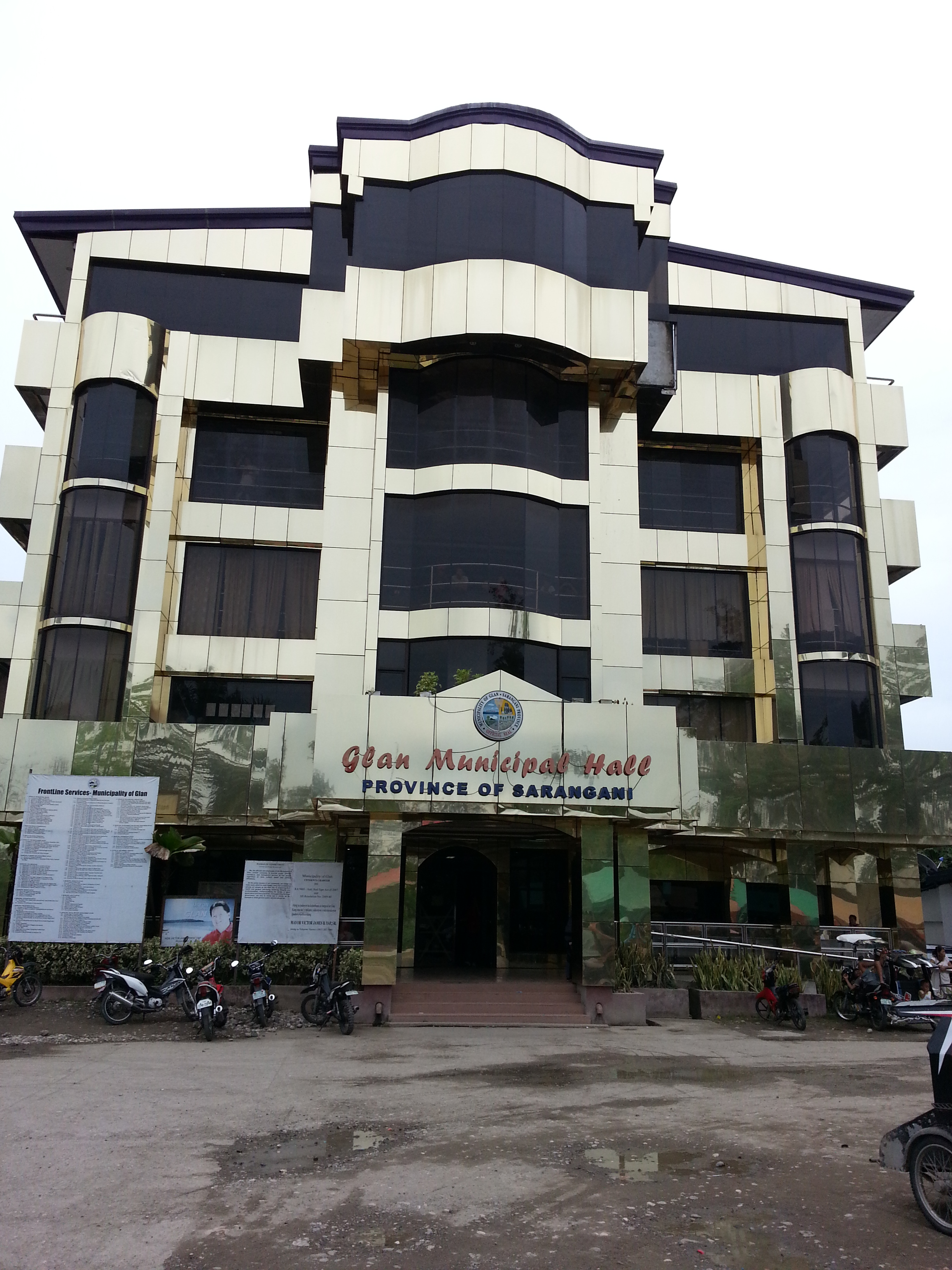
- Glan Golden Municipal Hall

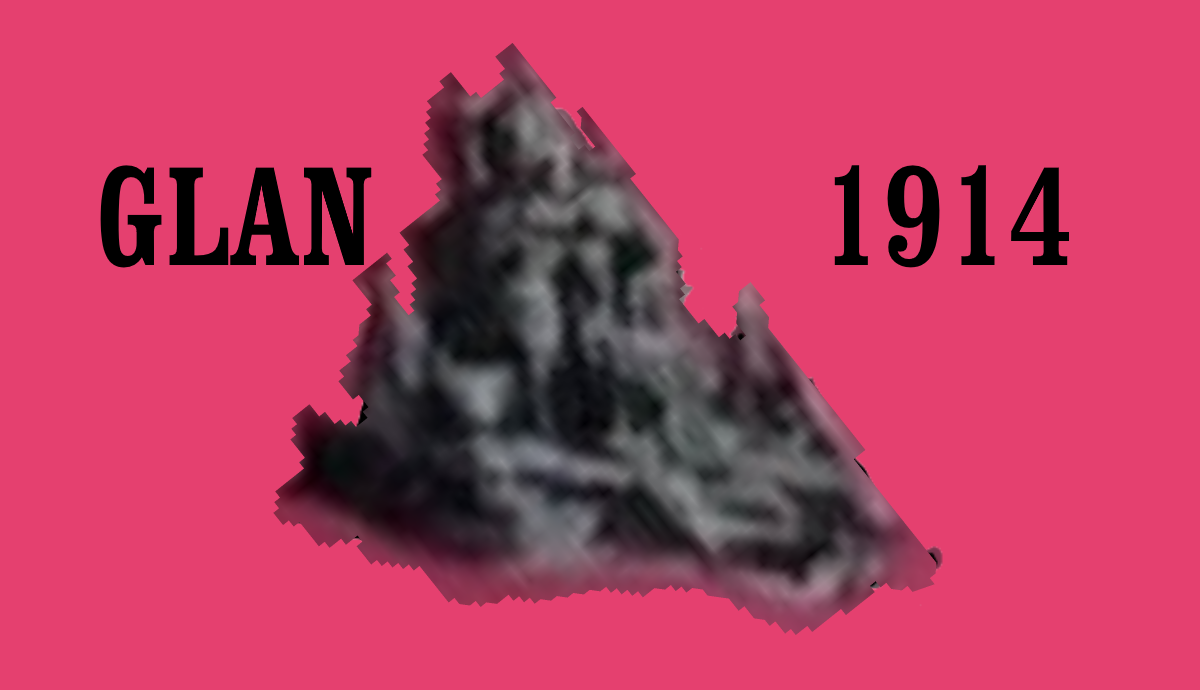
- Flag Seal
- Motto: "Tourtown Glan"
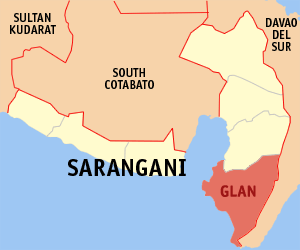
- Map of Sarangani with Glan highlighted
- Interactive map of Glan
- Location within the Philippines
- Coordinates: 5°49′23″N 125°12′15″E
- Country: Philippines
- Region: Soccsksargen
- Province: Sarangani
- District: Lone district
- Founded: First Settlers: October 8,1914; Early Pioneers: Tranquilino Ruiz, Sr.
- Municipalityhood: July 27, 1949.(Executive Order No. 250 was signed by President Elpidio Quirino)
- Barangays: 31 (see Barangays)

Government
  - Type: Sangguniang Bayan
  - Mayor: Victor James B. Yap Sr.
  - Vice Mayor: Victor James P. Yap Jr.
  - Representative: Steve Solon
  - Municipal Council: Members: Elsan Faith R. Engkong; Ricardo Q. Roque Jr.; Nazarius D. Wata; Lydia B. Hizoler; Edwin D. Pacaldo; Joselito A. Escobar; Carlos A. Homo; Florencia L. Senttilas
  - Electorate: 80,443 voters (2025)

Area
  - Total: 610.30 km^{2} (235.64 sq mi)
- Elevation: 53 m (174 ft)
- Highest elevation: 332 m (1,089 ft)
- Lowest elevation: 0 m (0 ft)

Population (2024 census)
  - Total: 117,017
  - Density: 191.74/km^{2} (496.60/sq mi)
  - Households: 27,233

Economy
  - Income class: 1st municipal income class
  - Poverty incidence: 31.73% (2023)
  - Revenue: ₱ 520.7 million (2024)
  - Assets: ₱ 1,527 million (2024)
  - Expenditure: ₱ 481.5 million (2024)
  - Liabilities: ₱ 336.2 million (2024)

Service provider
  - Electricity: South Cotabato 2 Electric Cooperative (SOCOTECO 2)
  - Water: Glan Water District
  - Telecommunications: Smart Communications; Globe Telecom; DITO Telecommunity
  - Cable TV: Cignal TV
  - Wifi and Internet provider: DITO Telecommunity, Smart Communications, Globe Telecom, and PLDT Fibr.
  - LPG Gas: Glan Golden Unicorn Store; ISID 25 Mini Mart and Last Frontier Petroleum OPC
  - Gasoline Station: Petron; K-Oil; BMJ Gasoline Station; Seaoil; Flying V
- Time zone: UTC+8 (PST)
- ZIP code: 9517
- PSGC: 1208002000
- IDD : area code: +63 (0)83
- Native languages: Cebuano; Tboli; Sarangani; Sangirese; Tagalog; Maguindanaon
- Website: www.glan.gov.ph

Glan, officially the Municipality of Glan (Note: Blaan: Banwé Glan Sinugboanon: Lungsod sa Glan Mëgindënëwn: Inged nu Glan Tboli: Benwu Glan Tagakolu: Lunsud na Glan Hiligaynon: Banwa sang Glan Ilokano: Ili ti Glan Filipino: Munisipalidad ng Glan), is a municipality in the province of Sarangani, Philippines. According to the 2024 census, it has a population of 117,017 people.

Glan is the most populous municipality in Sarangani and it is located east of Sarangani Bay, west of Davao Occidental, and north of the Celebes Sea. Barangay Sufatubo as the largest barangay in Glan, It is largely based on agriculture with a high level production of copra. Aquaculture is the second biggest income earner, notably milkfish and shrimps culture. Other agricultural products are coconuts, maize, sugarcane, bananas, pineapples, mangoes, pork, eggs, beef, and fish.

The economy accelerated in 2010s due to advances in global communication technology and the finishing of a modern highway, which improved trade and transport. The municipality is classified as he "heritage town" by cultural conservationists, including members of the National Commission for Culture and the Arts due to the many well-preserved ancestral houses and heritage structures within the municipality. The Heritage Conservation Society suggested an ordinance, similar to the ordinance in Vigan, that would protect Glan's heritage houses and aesthetics in 2014 for centuries to come. Some conservationists have also suggested for the town's inclusion in the Philippines tentative list for UNESCO World Heritage Site enlistment.

== History ==
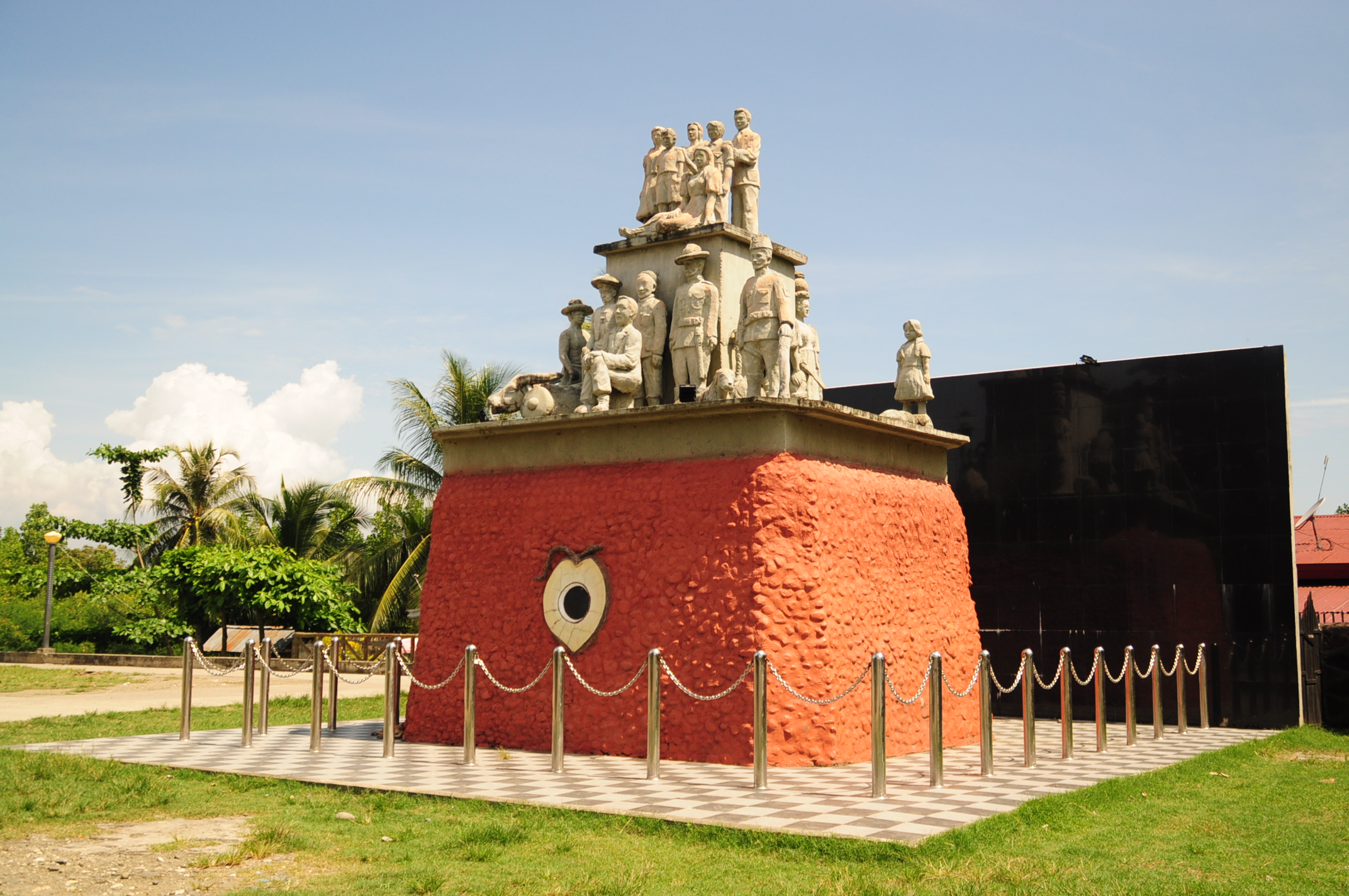
Agricultural Colony No. 9 Monument, Glan, Sarangani

In the early efforts of Independence from American administration, Sergio Osmeña, Sr. the president of the first convention of provincial governors had joined those nationalists who petitioned Governor William Howard Taft to allow the formation of a political party advocating immediate independence for the Philippines in 1902. Sergio Osmeña, while a governor of Cebu, he was elected as the first Speaker of national assembly in 1907 and uses the venue to request further more Filipino control in the colony or "Filipinization" of the colony. From 1907 to 1916, the executive power of the Philippines was vested in an American Governor General, assisted by the departmental secretaries. Under the Osmeña Act, which passed by the Philippine Legislature a portion of this act "which provides the colonization to all parts of Mindanao that includes Jolo, Sulo and Basilan." Hence, the distribution of land in Mindanao, program by the Bureau of Land "Free" otherwise known as "Homestead", comprises twenty four (24) hectares track of agricultural land in addition to townsite lot of nine hundred twenty (920) square meters to give free and distributed to Filipino families from all walks of life from Luzon and Visayas willing to owned and occupy land in Mindanao. Hence, this was known as sakada people migrated to Mindanao by way of shipment from Luzon and other parts of the Visayas.

In 1912, arriving at the port of Surigao where the office of the bureau of land under American supervision. A notice outside the office which read "Immediate Hiring of Workers" and willing to travel to all parts of Mindanao. Thus, Elpidio Empasis Barcelona, a very poor young Spanish Filipino mestizo hails from Tanke, Talisay in island of Cebu at the age of sixteen (16) became an employee of the Bureau of Land, under an American supervision in Land Survey Party. He works as a "transit man" and was designated as an assistant to the Engineering Land Surveyor due to his knowledge in mathematics. Experienced in surveying, his first assignment was from Butuan, Davao, and others parts of Cotabato, Pikit, Pagalungan, Midsayap as far as Zamboanga, Jolo, Sulo and Basilan. Also in 1912, back to area of Cotabato member of survey party led by an American geodetic engineer, continued their task of surveying, until they reached the most southern part of Cotabato, now called "GLAN", which was then unexplored before. The existence of the biggest form of trees with approximate diameter of five to six feet, the least was four feet in diameter. There were very few existing houses of Blaans and Maguindanaons, who were native inhabitants in the area, numbered not more than seven houses or shanties near the banks of the river, and there were also others who lived in shanties at the hinterland. They found no Christians alike, the place was still unknown its name. A member of the survey party, approached a certain native Maguindanaon man who happened sharpening his long bladed bolo, and asked the native in Cebuano, "amigo, unsay nga'an ning dapita, ning lugaraha?" (Friend, what's the name of this area, this place?). The man did not actually understand Cebuano, as he thought the stranger was asking what he was doing he answered "GALANG" means sharpening in Maguindanaon. Then and there, the member of the survey party reported to Barcelona the name of the place is "Galang". By mistake, it was named in the surveyed place and was established in the department of agriculture in a lot plan as "Colony No. 9- Glan". The man was later known as Po Mangalaw.

Elpidio Empasis Barcelona made a written request to his American supervisor and recommended to the Bureau of Land Secretary to be reassigned in Cotabato colony no. 9 to assist SACADA people from Visayas in filing their free-patent application, relative to distribution and location of their homestead and also with corresponding lot number. Barcelona request's was granted. On ground that this new unexplored land (Colony No. 9) must be distributed to people Christians alike and also includes the native Blaans and Maguindanaons.

Barcelona wrote a letter to his families back in Carcar, Cebu, inviting them and their neighbors to come and the people from San Fernando, Naga, and other parts of Cebu joined in going to a place now called Glan. These people from Carcar and neighboring towns in Cebu decided themselves by majority to charter another ship, that directly to land at its seashores at the valley of Glan. The arrival of first ship landed was on October 8, 1914. They were Fermin Adarna, Braulio Jimenez, Gavino Avila, Severino Maribosa, Esperidion Cania, Agapito Morales, Perpetuo Cellona, Luis Onin, Macario Ebona, Mamerto Del Pilar, Bernabe Flores, Jose Sarcon, Felipe Onay, Tomas Ugdamin, Damaso Intig and Eulogio Villaluz.

The second wave of southward arrival was on March 10, 1915. They were Gil Alcober, Gonzalo Cabilao, Primo Alcoriza, Braulio Calinawan, Baldomero Alducente, Gil Caliza, Gaspar Alido, Mateo Du, Urbano Alinsunurin, Felipe De Goma, Macario Alinsugay, Anatalio Flores, Graciano Algarme, Eusebio Lapis, Maximo Baclaan, Clemente Pangalao, Andres Barcelona, Eugenio Pangalao, Enrique Barcelona, Higino Paras, Arcadio Baring, Miguel Reyes, Francisco Bendigoza, Hospicio Sarmiento, Marcelo Bukog, Timoteo Sarmiento, Mariano Alinsugay and Gavino Tabanao.

These were the first Sacadas who built the town Glan. Later, Tranquilino Ruiz was assigned as Colony Supervisor around 1917 in Glan.

=== Heritage Town ===
The municipality is classified by members of the National Commission for Culture and the Arts as a heritage town. However, no ordinance or law has yet to be legislated for protection of Glan's heritage structures and colonial roads. A Vigan-type ordinance has been suggested by the Heritage Conservation Society, so that the town may be added to the Philippines UNESCO Tentative List in the future.

== Geography ==
=== Barangays ===
Glan is politically subdivided into 31 barangays. Each barangay consists of puroks while some have sitios.

- Baliton
- Batotuling
- Batulaki
- Big Margus
- Burias
- Cablalan
- Calabanit
- Calpidong
- Congan
- Cross
- Datalbukay
- E. Alegado
- Glan Padidu
- Gumasa
- Ilaya
- Kaltuad
- Kapatan
- Lago
- Laguimit
- Mudan
- New Aklan
- Pangyan
- Poblacion
- Rio Del Pilar
- San Jose
- San Vicente
- Small Margus
- Sufatubo
- Taluya
- Tango
- Tapon

=== Climate ===
Climate data for Glan, Sarangani
Month	Jan	Feb	Mar	Apr	May	Jun	Jul	Aug	Sep	Oct	Nov	Dec	Year
Mean daily maximum °C (°F)	31 (88)	31 (88)	31 (88)	31 (88)	30 (86)	29 (84)	29 (84)	29 (84)	30 (86)	30 (86)	30 (86)	30 (86)	30 (86)
Mean daily minimum °C (°F)	23 (73)	23 (73)	23 (73)	24 (75)	25 (77)	24 (75)	24 (75)	24 (75)	24 (75)	24 (75)	24 (75)	24 (75)	24 (75)
Average precipitation mm (inches)	129 (5.1)	106 (4.2)	148 (5.8)	180 (7.1)	261 (10.3)	316 (12.4)	295 (11.6)	274 (10.8)	220 (8.7)	238 (9.4)	243 (9.6)	181 (7.1)	2,591 (102.1)
Average rainy days	17.4	16.2	19.5	22.8	27.6	27.9	26.5	25.7	24.0	26.6	27.2	23.5	284.9
Source: Meteoblue

== Demographics ==
Population census of Glan
Year	Pop.	±% p.a.
1918	6,309	—
1939	9,364	+1.90%
1948	20,342	+9.00%
1960	31,320	+3.66%
1970	37,879	+1.92%
1975	38,218	+0.18%
1980	48,882	+5.04%
1990	60,382	+2.14%
1995	73,768	+3.82%
2000	83,051	+2.57%
2007	102,676	+2.97%
2010	106,518	+1.35%
2015	118,263	+2.01%
2020	109,547	−1.60%
2024	117,017	+1.60%
Source: Philippine Statistics Authority

== Economy ==
Poverty incidence of Glan (%)

Source: Philippine Statistics Authority
