= 2016 Iligan local elections =

Philippine election

Iligan City Mayoralty Elections, 2016
- May 9, 2016
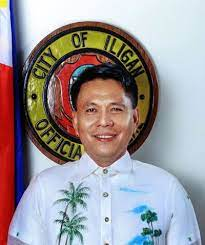
Nominee	Celso Regencia	Ruderic Marzo	Simplicio Larrazabal III
Party	NPC	Liberal	UNA
Running mate	Jemar Vera Cruz	Providencio Abragan Jr.
Popular vote	68,995	37,029	9,566
Percentage	58.51%	31.40%	8.11%
Nominee	Philamer Sabarre	Datu Ismail Malangas
Party	CDP	LM
Popular vote	2,195	120
Percentage	1.86%	0.10%
Mayor before election
Celso Regencia
NUP
Elected mayor
Celso Regencia
NPC

Local elections held in Iligan City on May 9, 2016 as part of the Philippine general election. The resident voters elected officials for the elective local posts in the city: the mayor, vice mayor, the one congressman, and twelve councilors.

At the end of filing of certificates of candidacy (COC) last October 16, 2015, a total of 77 hopefuls have filed their COC for city's 15 elective positions: 10 are running for congressman, 5 for mayor, 2 for vice-mayor, and 60 for city councilors.

== Candidates for Lone District Representative ==
Vicente Belmonte, Jr. (LP) is the incumbent. However, he is already on his last term and ineligible for reelection. Instead, he decided to run for mayor. However, he later dropped his candidacy.

Three candidates from the ruling party are vying for the lone congressional seat; they are acting mayor Ruderic Marzo, former mayor Lawrence Lluch-Cruz and current councilor Frederick Siao. At the end, Cruz luckily received the certificate of nomination and acceptance (CONA) from Liberal Party. Later, Ruderic Marzo withdrew his candidacy for congressman.

2016 Philippine House of Representatives election in Iligan City
Party	Candidate	Votes	%
UNA	Frederick Siao	34,222	29.93%
NPC	Alipio Cirilo Badelles	26,267	22.97%
Liberal	Lawrence Lluch-Cruz	21,521	18.82%
CDP	Vermin Quimco	13,662	11.94%
PDP–Laban	Franklin Quijano	13,540	11.84%
Independent	Melchora Ambalong	2,378	2.07%
Independent	Uriel Borja	1,993	1.74%
Independent	Samson Dajao	381	0.33%
Independent	Luis Carrillo	363	0.31%
Total votes		124,915	100%

== Candidates for Mayor ==
Suspended mayor Celso Regencia (NPC) is the incumbent. Vice Mayor Ruderic Marzo (LP) serves as the acting mayor.

On November 16, 2015, Vicente Belmonte Jr. withdrew his candidacy for mayor citing security reasons. He later named incumbent vice-mayor Ruderic Marzo (LP) as his substitute, who filed his certificate candidacy on December 7, 2015.

Iligan City Mayoral Election
Party	Candidate	Votes	%
NPC	Celso Regencia	68,995	58.51%
Liberal	Ruderic Marzo	37,029	31.40%
UNA	Simplicio Larrazabal III	9,566	8.11%
CDP	Philamer Sabarre	2,195	1.86%
LM	Datu Ismail Malangas	120	0.10%
Total votes		124,915	100%

== Candidates for Vice Mayor ==
Acting mayor Ruderic Marzo is the incumbent. Jemar Vera Cruz is a priest running for vice-mayor of the city. Parties are as stated in their certificates of candidacy.

Iligan City Vice Mayoral Election
Party	Candidate	Votes	%
NPC	Jemar Vera Cruz	61,417	55.76%
Liberal	Providencio Abragan Jr.	48,716	44.23%
Total votes		124,915	100%

== Candidates for City Councilors ==
Below is the complete list of candidates for city councilors.

2016 Iligan City Council Elections
Party	Candidate	Votes	%
NPC	Samuel Huertas	68,761	5.71%
NPC	Eric Capitan	55,817	4.64%
NPC	Jessie Balanay	53,294	4.43%
NPC	Demosthenes Plando	49,107	4.08%
NPC	Belinda Lim	48,874	4.06%
NPC	Sorilie Christine Bacsarpa	48,265	22.97%
Liberal	Rosevi Belmonte	48,108	3.99%
NPC	Ian Uy	46,835	3.89%
NPC	Ryan Ong	45,812	3.80%
Liberal	Bernard Pacaña	44,280	3.68%
NPC	Noli Pardillo	42,845	3.56%
NPC	Renato Ancis	42,080	3.49%
Liberal	Marlene Young	41,429	3.44%
Liberal	Michelle Sweet-Booc	37,226	3.09%
Liberal	Usafeno Obial	36,811	3.06%
Independent	Henry Dy	36,297	3.01%
NPC	Norodin Cabaro	36,231	3.01%
Liberal	Emmanuel Salibay	35,386	2.94%
Liberal	Roy Openiano	33,468	2.78%
Liberal	Alfredo Busico	32,926	2.73%
NPC	Valeriano Murillo Jr.	31,302	2.60%
Liberal	Moises Dalisay Jr.	28,950	2.40%
Liberal	Jose Zalsos	27,141	2.25%
Independent	Chonilo Ruiz	24,363	2.02%
Liberal	Rejoice Subejano	24,348	2.02%
PDP–Laban	Roberto Quijano	16,438	1.36%
CDP	Zaldy Lim	16,360	1.36%
PDP–Laban	Livey Villarin	10,364	0.86%
UNA	Mariza Go-Minaga	9,852	0.81%
CDP	Samuel Largo	9,383	0.78%
UNA	Antonio Flores	8,372	0.69%
CDP	Edgardo Prospero	7,066	0.58%
Independent	Pedro Sabayle	6,988	0.58%
Independent	Wilfredo Dimamay	6,195	0.51%
PDP–Laban	Alfredo Lopez	6,169	0.51%
Independent	Ronnie Espina	6,004	0.49%
Independent	Ma. Josefa Labaro	5,605	0.46%
Independent	Francisco Manga	5,601	0.46%
PDP–Laban	Charles Marquez	5,565	0.46%
Independent	Terry Mecarsos	5,504	0.45%
Independent	Eufemio Calio	5,205	0.43%
Independent	Jim Pineda	5,043	0.41%
UNA	Podoy Echavez	5,022	0.41%
Independent	Veronico Guiritan	4,828	0.40%
CDP	Jeffrey Oponda	4,509	0.37%
UNA	Alan Macaraya	4,463	0.37%
UNA	Heinz Madjos	4,251	0.35%
CDP	Bong Quiapo	3,661	0.30%
Independent	Vicente Rubin	3,638	0.30%
Independent	Joe Booc	3,503	0.29%
Independent	Elizer Escalona	2,168	0.18%
Independent	Joan Tabinas	2,081	0.17%
Independent	Felisa Bancale	2,069	0.17%
Independent	Elly dela Cerna	1,987	0.16%
Independent	Fidel Yangyang	1,839	0.15%
Independent	Juancho Molo	1,764	0.14%
Independent	Rudy Longos	1,291	0.10%
Total votes		1,197,850	100.00%
