= 2013 San Pedro local elections =

Filipino local election

2013 San Pedro mayoral election
- May 13, 2013
| Nominee | Lourdes S. Cataquiz | Norvic D. Solidum |
| Party | Nacionalista | Liberal |
| Running mate | Rafael P. Campos | Sheriliz B. Almoro |
| Popular vote | 60,561 | 34,223 |
| Percentage | 62.87% | 35.53% |
Mayor before election
Calixto R. Catáquiz
Nacionalista
Elected mayor
Lourdes S. Catáquiz
Nacionalista

Local elections were held in San Pedro, Laguna, on May 13, 2013, within the Philippine general election. The voters elected for the elective local posts in the city: the mayor, vice mayor, and eight councilors.

== Mayoral and vice mayoral election ==
Incumbent Mayor Calixto Catáquiz decided to run for reelection under Nacionalista Party but on 7 May 2013, was disqualified by the Comelec (First Division). He was later substituted by his wife Mrs. Lourdes S. Cataquiz, former Vice Mayor of San Pedro (2004-2007). Her opponents are the incumbent vice-mayor Norvic Solidum under the Liberal Party and Berlene Alberto an independent candidate.

Seven candidates are running for vice-mayor; Sheriliz Almoro under Liberal Party, Nacionalista Party's Rafael Campos, Melvin Matibag from Nationalist People's Coalition and four independent candidates namely Roland De Leon, Ray Michael Junia, Lito Patromo and Ernesto Remoquillo, Jr.

== Results ==
The candidates for mayor and vice mayor with the highest number of votes wins the seat; they are voted separately, therefore, they may be of different parties when elected.

=== Mayoral and vice mayoral elections ===
San Pedro mayoralty election
| Party | Candidate | Votes | % |
|---|---|---|---|
| Nacionalista | Lourdes S. Catáquiz | 60,561 | 62.87 |
| Liberal | Norvic D. Solidum | 34,223 | 35.53 |
| Independent | Berlene T. Alberto | 1,548 | 1.60 |
| Margin of victory | | 26,338 | 27.34% |
| Turnout | | 96,332 | 100 |
| Nacionalista gain from Liberal | | | |

San Pedro vice mayoralty election
| Party | Candidate | Votes | % |
|---|---|---|---|
| Nacionalista | Rafael P. Campos | 37,211 | 38.67 |
| Liberal | Sheriliz B. Almoro | 32,713 | 34.48 |
| NPC | Melvin A. Matibag | 22,266 | 23.61 |
| Independent | Ray Michael M. Junia | 1,899 | 1.99 |
| Independent | Ernesto D. Remoquillo, Jr. | 583 | 0.63 |
| Independent | Roland De Leon | 293 | 0.33 |
| Independent | Libreto Y. Patromo | 290 | 0.30 |
| Margin of victory | | 4,498 | 4.72 |
| Turnout | | 95,255 | 100 |
| Nacionalista gain from Liberal | | | |

=== Municipal Council elections ===
San Pedro municipal Council election
| Party | Candidate | Votes | % |
|---|---|---|---|
| Nacionalista | Celso D. Ambayec | 51,072 | 8.09 |
| Nacionalista | Leslie E. Lu | 50,785 | 8.07 |
| Nacionalista | Delio L. Hatulan | 50 310 | 8.03 |
| Nacionalista | Michael M. Casacop | 49,970 | 7.95 |
| Nacionalista | Marlon A. Acierto | 47,033 | 7.46 |
| Nacionalista | Diwa T. Tayao | 44,613 | 7.01 |
| Nacionalista | Reynaldo B. Hermoso | 34,171 | 5.41 |
| NPC | Iryne V. Vierneza | 32,473 | 5.24 |
| Nacionalista | Julian V. Ventura | 31,434 | 4.92 |
| Independent | Divina Olivarez | 29,460 | 4.75 |
| Liberal | Reynaldo Capina | 27,557 | 4.32 |
| NPC | Carlon S. Ambayec | 25,353 | 4.06 |
| Liberal | Medvic Carrillo | 23,227 | 3.72 |
| Liberal | Andres T. Reyes III | 20,795 | 3.30 |
| Liberal | Ernesto G. Bismar | 18,372 | 2.89 |
| NPC | Robert Esquivel | 17,792 | 2.83 |
| Liberal | Eliezer Andres, Jr. | 15,955 | 2.56 |
| Liberal | Samuel R. Rivera | 13,248 | 2.12 |
| Liberal | Dodie F. King | 13,078 | 2.08 |
| NPC | Raul C. Abulencia | 12,327 | 1.92 |
| Independent | Anna Rosario Ramos | 4,160 | 0.68 |
| Independent | Jaime Barron | 3,982 | 0.64 |
| NPC | Carlos B. Dungao, Jr. | 3,358 | 0.54 |
| Independent | Cherry Pamaran | 3,012 | 0.51 |
| Independent | Ariel Gutierrez | 2,802 | 0.45 |
| Independent | Russell Edward Verder | 1,544 | 0.25 |
| NPC | Erwyn Narvas | 1,346 | 0.21 |
| Invalid or blank votes | | | |
| Total votes | | 86,787 | 100 |
