= 2013 Imus local elections =

1st City elections in Imus

- May 13, 2013
Nominee	Emmanuel Maliksi	Homer Saquilayan
Party	Liberal	Nacionalista
Running mate	Armando Ilano	Patrizenette Camia-Villena
Popular vote	52,137	49,562
Percentage	51.27	48.73
Mayor before election
Emmanuel Maliksi
Liberal
Elected mayor
Emmanuel Maliksi
Liberal

Local elections were held in Imus on May 13, 2013, in conjunction with the 2013 Philippine general election. Registered voters of the city elected candidates for the following elective local posts: district representative, provincial board members representing the city, mayor, vice mayor, and twelve councilors at-large.

Mayor Emmanuel Maliksi of the Liberal Party narrowly won over ousted Mayor Homer Saquilayan while his running mate, Vice Mayor Mandy Ilano was reelected overwhelmingly. Maliksi's ticket took the majority seats in the Sangguniang Panlungsod.

== Overview ==
The most recent elections conducted in the then-municipality of Imus in 2010 is considered as one of the most controversial, if not the most controversial, elections with questionable results. In the country's first-ever automated election, where precinct optical count scanning (PCOS) machines were utilized, then comebacking Homer Saquilayan defeated the then incumbent Mayor Manny Maliksi, once his vice mayor and the son of then governor Ayong Maliksi, by 8,429 votes. On May 21, 2010, Maliksi filed an election protest alleging irregularities caused by the PCOS machine count, among others "double-shading" of ballots, ambiguous votes, and over-voting.

After the first recount, Imus Regional Trial Court Judge Cesar Mangrobang released a decision in November 2011 declaring the younger Maliksi as the duly elected mayor of the town, with 41,088 votes as against that of Saquilayan's 40,423, for a difference of 665 votes. This decision angered the incumbent mayor's supporters and municipal employees and on December 2, 2011, they successfully prevented Maliksi in formally assuming office, thereby causing further tension between the rival camps. Such tension only averted three days before the turn of the year on December 28, 2011, when Saquilayan ceded the post to his rival with the promise of avenging his latest setback before the courts and the COMELEC.

Barely five months later, in May 2012, the COMELEC overturned the decision of Mangrobang, citing that he gravely abused its discretion when it issued the order since it did not have the necessary grounds and ordered Saquilayan to be reinstated. This prompted Maliksi to file a motion for reconsideration but it was dismissed by the poll body in September 2012 "for lack of merit." On October 10, 2012, Maliksi elevated his appeal to the Supreme Court and filed a petition for an issuance of a temporary restraining order (TRO). Five days later, Chief Justice Maria Lourdes Sereno issued him a TRO.

The TRO was lifted by the Supreme Court on March 12, 2013 and declared Saquilayan as the duly elected mayor. He took his oath six days later, on March 18. Maliksi, however, refused to recognize the ruling and filed for a motion for reconsideration, which the court granted on April 11, 2013, thereby reinstating him as mayor.

== Results ==
Names in boldface denote the winners.

=== District Representative ===
The candidates for district representative, mayor, and vice mayor with the highest number of votes win their respective seats. They are elected separately; therefore, they may be of different parties when elected.

Representative Ayong Maliksi is running for Governor. His party nominates former Board Member Alex Advincula.

Albert Villaseca is also nominated by Lakas–CMD.

Philippine House of Representatives election at Cavite's 3rd district
Party	Candidate	Votes	%
**Liberal**	**Alex Advincula**	**63,123**	**65.90**
Lakas	Albert Villaseca	31,854	33.26
Nacionalista	Eleazar Salon	809	0.84
Total votes		**95,786**	**100.00**
Liberal **hold**			

=== Board Members ===
Voters of Imus elect two members to the Sangguniang Panlalawigan of Cavite as part of the third district, which is contiguous with the legislative district. The two candidates with the highest number of votes for the positions win.

Larry Boy Nato is the only incumbent who sought reelection, which Rodrigo Arguelles did not run in favor of Councilor Arnel Cantimbuhan.

Sangguniang Panlalawigan election at Cavite's 3rd district
Party	Candidate	Votes	%
**Liberal**	**Arnel Cantimbuhan**	**52,141**	**36.06**
**Liberal**	**Larry Boy Nato**	**51,253**	**35.44**
Nacionalista	Anthony Astillero	19,800	13.69
Nacionalista	Rodrigo Camia Jr.	19,359	13.39
PMP	Lucius Minaldo	2,062	1.43
Total votes		**144,615**	**100.00**

=== Mayor ===
Imus Mayoral Election
Party	Candidate	Votes	%
**Liberal**	**Emmanuel Maliksi**	**52,137**	**51.27**
Nacionalista	Homer Saquilayan	49,562	48.73
Total votes		**101,699**	**100.00**
Liberal **hold**			

=== Vice Mayor ===
Imus Vice Mayoral Election
Party	Candidate	Votes	%
**Liberal**	**Armando Ilano**	**53,676**	**61.82**
Nacionalista	Patrizenette Camia-Villena	33,149	38.18
Total votes		**86,825**	**100.00**
Liberal **hold**			

=== City Councilors ===
Upon the adoption of a city charter, seats in the new Sangguniang Panglungsod of Imus (Imus City Council) have increased from eight to twelve and were elected at-large, similar to that of neighboring city of Dasmariñas and 98% of component cities in the Philippines.

==== Candidates ====
Of the incumbent councilors elected in 2010, only one did not seek re-election:

- **Argel Joseph Reyes**, and
- **Arnel Cantimbuhan**, who is running for provincial board member representing Imus.

Aside from re-electionist candidates, names in italics denote appointed councilors and ex officio officials, in the case of SK Federation President Darlon Jay Sayarot.

===== Administration coalition (Team Maliksi) =====
Liberal Party/Team Maliksi
Name	Party	Result
Emilio Aguinaldo V (inc.)	Liberal	won
Vincent "Vince" Amposta (inc.)	Liberal	won
Raymond Arguelles (inc.)	Liberal	won
George Cabarloc Jr.	Liberal	lost
Rommel Camerino	Liberal	lost
Oscar "Oca" De Quiroz (inc.)	Liberal	won
Leonardo Antonio Deocadis (inc.)	Liberal	won
Eunice Ferriol (inc.)	Liberal	won
Mary Jemeny "Jem" Yulo-Guinto* (inc.)	Liberal	won
Shernan Jaro (inc.)	Liberal	won
Dennis Lacson (inc.)	Liberal	won
Darlon Jay Sayarot	Liberal	won

===== Primary opposition coalition (Team Saki-Villena) =====
Nacionalista Party-Lakas-Magdalo/Team Saki-Villena
Name	Party	Result
Renato Aguirre	Nacionalista	lost
Jeffrey Asistio (inc.)	Nacionalista	won
Myrna Camaisa	Nacionalista	lost
Raymond Camama	Nacionalista	lost
Carina Camerino	Nacionalista	lost
Elena Damaso	Nacionalista	lost
Nelson Louie Genido	Nacionalista	lost
Darwin Marti Remulla	Nacionalista	lost
Lucio Salvador	Nacionalista	lost
Alexander San Juan	Nacionalista	lost
Edgardo Saquilayan	Nacionalista	won
Alexander Villanueva	Nacionalista	lost

===== Independent candidates not in tickets =====
Independent/City of Imus
Name	Party	Result
Domingo Reyes	Independent	lost
Ronnie Sapinoso	Independent	lost
Deng Sarte	Independent	lost

==== Results ====
Imus City Council election
Party	Candidate	Votes	%
**Liberal**	**Shernan Jaro**	**52,432**	**5.92**
**Liberal**	**Eunice Ferriol**	**50,643**	**5.72**
**Liberal**	**Mary Jemeny Yulo-Guinto**	**50,313**	**5.68**
**Liberal**	**Emilio Aguinaldo V**	**49,787**	**5.62**
**Liberal**	**Darlon Jay Sayarot**	**47,468**	**5.36**
**Liberal**	**Dennis Lacson**	**47,468**	**5.34**
**Nacionalista**	**Jeffrey Asistio**	**45,040**	**5.09**
**Liberal**	**Leonardo Antonio Deocadis**	**41,726**	**4.71**
**Liberal**	**Raymond Arguelles**	**41,391**	**4.67**
**Liberal**	**Vincent Amposta**	**40,272**	**4.55**
**Liberal**	**Oscar De Quiroz**	**39,860**	**4.50**
**Nacionalista**	**Edgardo Saquilayan**	**35,823**	**4.05**
Liberal	Rommel Camerino	35,560	4.02
Liberal	George Cabarloc Jr.	34,946	3.95
Nacionalista	Alex Villanueva	34,645	3.91
Nacionalista	Darwin Marti Remulla	32,876	3.71
Nacionalista	Myrna Camaisa	32,486	3.67
Nacionalista	Carina Camerino	29,123	3.29
Nacionalista	Lucio Salvador	26,698	3.02
Nacionalista	Raymond Camama	23,643	2.67
Nacionalista	Rey Aguirre	23,037	2.60
Nacionalista	Alexander San Juan	20,912	2.36
Nacionalista	Elena Damaso	18,648	2.11
Nacionalista	Nelson Louie Genido	18,615	2.10
Independent	Ronnie Sapinoso	5,179	0.58
Independent	Domingo Reyes	3,744	0.42
Independent	Deng Sarte	3,235	0.37
Total votes		**885,402**	**100.00**
