= 2013 Lipa local elections =

2013 Lipa mayoral election
- May 13, 2013
Nominee	Meynardo Sabili	Lydio Lopez, Jr.	Merlo Silva
Party	Liberal	UNA	PMP
Running mate	Eric Africa	Marlon Luancing	Avior Rocafort
Popular vote	50,140	38,519	2,996
Percentage	54.27	41.69	3.24
Mayor before election
Meynardo Sabili
Liberal
Elected mayor
Meynardo Sabili
Liberal

Local elections were held in Lipa, Batangas, on May 13, 2013, within the Philippine general election. The voters will elect for the elective local posts in the city: the mayor, vice mayor, and ten councilors.

== Mayoral and vice mayoral election ==
Incumbent Mayor Meynardo Sabili decided to run for reelection under the Liberal Party. He was elected as Mayor in 2010 defeating then incumbent Oscar L. Gozos despite his disqualification due to his residency. Sabili is from San Juan, Batangas, but it is stated in his certificate of candidacy that Sabili was a registered voter in Pinagtongulan. His running mate is councilor Eric Africa.

One of Sabili's opponents is the outgoing Vice Mayor Lydio Lopez, Jr.(running under the [United Nationalist Alliance])whose running mate is the Chairman of Barangay Antipolo del Sur and incumbent Liga ng mga Barangay President Marlon Luancing. Another opponent is the top councilor of Lipa (from the 2010 Elections), Merlo Silva running with incumbent three-time Lipa City councilor Avior Rocafort both under the party PMP (Pwersa ng Masang Pilipino) centering their platforms on the general masses or the marginalized populace of the city.

== Candidates ==
=== Mayoral and vice-mayoral ===
==== Administration Coalition ====
Liberal Party/Team Sabili-Africa ticket
Name	Party
Meynardo A. Sabili (Incumbent mayor)	Liberal
Eric Africa (Vice-mayor)	Liberal

==== Primary Opposition Coalition ====
UNA/Team Lead U ticket
Name	Party
Lydio Lopez, Jr. (Mayor/Incumbent Vice Mayor)	UNA
Marlon Luancing (Vice-mayor)	UNA

=== City Council election ===
Voting is via plurality-at-large voting: Voters vote for ten (10) candidates and the ten candidates with the highest number of votes are elected.

Retiring and Term limited candidates as follow:

- Merlo Silva-running for Mayor under Pwersa ng Masang Pilipino
- Eric Africa-running for Vice Mayor under Liberal Party
- Ralph Peter Umali-running for Vice Mayor under Nationalist People's Coalition
- Avior Rocafort-running for Vice Mayor under Pwersa ng Masang Pilipino
- Dy Pang Lim-running for Board Member of the 4th District of Batangas
- Dominador Mauhay

==== Administration coalition ====
Liberal Party/Team Sabili-Africa ticket
Name	Party
Kathleen Briones	Liberal
Josef Frederik Dijan	Liberal
Francisco Fajutagana	Liberal
Pacita Leviste	Liberal
Donato Linatoc	Liberal
Mark Aries Luancing	Liberal
Renato Malleta	Independent
Mario Medina	Independent
Nonato Monfero	Independent
Joel Pua	Liberal

==== Primary opposition coalition ====
United Nationalist Alliance/Team Lead U ticket
Name	Party
Leonilo Catipon	NPC
Bernardine Go	UNA
Ma. Concepcion Hernandez	UNA
Guillermo Ilagan	NPC
Juan Lat	UNA
Aries Macala	NPC
Eleno Mea	UNA
Aries Emmanuel Mendoza	NPC
Raul Montealto	NPC
Nicasio Virrey	UNA

== Results ==
The candidates for mayor and vice mayor with the highest number of votes wins the seat; they are voted separately, therefore, they may be of different parties when elected.

=== Mayoral and vice mayoral elections ===
Lipa City mayoral election
Party	Candidate	Votes	%
Liberal	Meynardo Sabili	50,140	54.27
UNA	Lydio Lopez, Jr.	38,519	41.69
PMP	Merlo Silva	2,996	3.24
Independent	Lyn Dimaano	590	0.64
Independent	Roy Sanggalang	152	0.16
Total votes		95,136	100.00
Liberal hold			

Lipa City Vice Mayoral Election
Party	Candidate	Votes	%
Liberal	Eric Africa	38,280	42.65
NPC	Ralph Peter Umali	20,865	23.25
UNA	Marlon Luancing	14,969	16.68
PMP	Avior Rocafort	10,106	11.26
Independent	Mario Panganiban	5,534	6.17
Total votes		95,136	
Liberal gain from UNA			

=== City Council election ===
Voting is via plurality-at-large voting: Voters vote for ten (10) candidates and the ten candidates with the highest number of votes are elected.

Lipa City Council election
Party	Candidate	Votes	%
Liberal	Kathleen Briones		
Liberal	Mark Aries Luancing		
NPC	Ma. Concepcion Hernandez		
NPC	Aries Emmanuel Mendoza		
Liberal	Joel Pua		
NPC	Raul Montealto		
Liberal	Pacita Leviste		
NPC	Leonilo Catipon		
Independent	Nonato Monfero		
Liberal	Donato Linatoc		
NPC	Aries Macala		
Liberal	Josef Frederik Dijan		
Independent	Mario Medina		
NPC	Guillermo Ilagan		
Liberal	Francisco Fajutagana		
Independent	Renato Malleta		
PMP	Ariel Africa		
UNA	Eleno Mea		
UNA	Bernardine Go		
UNA	Nicasio Virrey		
UNA	Juan Lat		
PMP	Edwin Katigbak		
PMP	Ricardo Leyesa		
Independent	Larry Maparangalan		
PMP	Larsil Cueto		
PMP	Apolinar Salvacion		
Independent	Leo Ona		
Independent	Ramir Bathan		
PMP	Ronald Allan Mangao		
PMP	Gina Sabater		
PMP	Rodelio Dimaano		
PMP	Luisito Papilla		
Independent	Mario Albalate		
Total votes			
