= 2013 San Pablo local elections =

Philippine election

2013 San Pablo mayoral election
- May 13, 2013
| Nominee | Loreto Amante | Hizon Arago | Angelo Adriano |
| Party | UNA | Liberal | Independent |
| Running mate | Angelita Yang | Martin Ilagan | Michael Anthony Potenciano |
| Popular vote | 59,449 | 17,612 | 12,143 |
| Percentage | 61.06 | 18.09 | 12.47 |
| Nominee | Florante Aquino |
| Party | PDP–Laban |
| Running mate | Restituto Mendoza |
| Popular vote | 8,162 |
| Percentage | 8.38 |
Mayor before election
Vicente B. Amante
Lakas–Kampi
Elected mayor
Loreto Amante
UNA

Local elections were held in San Pablo, Laguna, on May 13, 2013, within the Philippine general election. The voters elected for the elective local posts in the city: the mayor, vice mayor, and ten councilors.

== Mayoral and vice mayoral election ==
Incumbent Mayor Vicente B. Amante is term limited. his party UNA nominate his son and city administrator Loreto Amante. his opponents are former congressman in 3rd district and mayor Florante Aquino from PDP-Laban, former city administrator Hizon Arago, father of Congresswoman Maria Evita Arago from Liberal Party and Incumbent councilor Angelo Adriano as an independent candidate.

Incumbent vice-mayor Angelita Yang will run as a reelectionist under UNA, her opponents are Restituto Mendoza, PDP-Laban's nominee, Former councilor and vice-mayor Frederick Martin Ilagan from Liberal Party, Incumbent councilor Alejandro Yu from Nacionalista Party, Edwin Gapunay and Michael Anthony Potenciano both independent candidates.

== Results ==
The candidates for mayor and vice mayor with the highest number of votes wins the seat; they are voted separately, therefore, they may be of different parties when elected.

=== Mayoral and vice mayoral elections ===
San Pablo City mayoralty election
| Party | Candidate | Votes | % |
|---|---|---|---|
| UNA | Loreto Amante | 59,449 | 58.07 |
| Liberal | Hizon Arago | 17,612 | 17.20 |
| Independent | Angelo Adriano | 12,143 | 11.86 |
| PDP–Laban | Florante Aquino | 8,162 | 7.97 |
| Margin of victory | | 41,837 | 40.87 |
| Invalid or blank votes | | 5,007 | 4.89 |
| Total votes | | 102,373 | 100.00 |
| UNA gain from Lakas | | | |

San Pablo City vice mayoralty election
| Party | Candidate | Votes | % |
|---|---|---|---|
| UNA | Angelita Yang | 39,039 | 38.13 |
| Liberal | Frederick Martin Ilagan | 18,500 | 18.07 |
| Nacionalista | Alejandro Yu | 18,443 | 18.02 |
| PDP–Laban | Restiuto Mendoza | 13,337 | 13.03 |
| Independent | Michael Anthony Potenciano | 4,376 | 4.27 |
| Independent | Edwin Gapunay | 373 | 0.36 |
| Margin of victory | | 20,539 | 20.06 |
| Invalid or blank votes | | 8,305 | 8.11 |
| Total votes | | 102,373 | 100.00 |
| UNA hold | | | |

== City Council ==
Election in the city council is at large at 10 seats will be on the line.

San Pablo City Council election
| Party | Candidate | Votes | % |
|---|---|---|---|
| UNA | Justin Colago | 47,737 | 6.87 |
| UNA | Karla Monica Adajar | 46,122 | 6.64 |
| UNA | Rondel Diaz | 43,677 | 6.28 |
| Liberal | Gali Galicia | 41,745 | 6.01 |
| Nacionalista | Jojo Biglete | 41,323 | 5.95 |
| UNA | Ed Dizon | 38,532 | 5.54 |
| UNA | Arnel Ticzon | 36,588 | 5.26 |
| UNA | Nap Calatabra | 31,914 | 4.59 |
| Nacionalista | LC Pavico | 31,102 | 4.48 |
| Independent | Fernando See | 25,803 | 3.71 |
| UNA | Daboy Rogador | 25,713 | 3.70 |
| UNA | Rico Albanio | 24,080 | 3.46 |
| Liberal | Larry Dizon | 21,793 | 3.14 |
| Independent | Restie Puntanar | 21,655 | 3.12 |
| Liberal | Lina Buencillo | 19,556 | 2.81 |
| Liberal | Anthony Yang | 18,491 | 2.66 |
| Liberal | Jimmy Ticzon | 17,645 | 2.54 |
| UNA | Abner Dionglay | 17,449 | 2.51 |
| PDP–Laban | Michael Cosico | 14,795 | 2.13 |
| UNA | Willy Degoriztiza | 14,407 | 2.07 |
| PDP–Laban | Paolo Jose Lopez | 14,327 | 2.06 |
| Liberal | Alvy Ortiz | 12,142 | 1.75 |
| Independent | Aldin Rubit | 11,445 | 1.65 |
| PDP–Laban | Pol Cortez | 11,380 | 1.64 |
| Liberal | Gilbert Tan | 10,523 | 1.51 |
| Independent | Menandro Avanzado | 7,259 | 1.04 |
| PDP–Laban | Vio Villaflor | 7,154 | 1.03 |
| Independent | Anneline Castillo | 6,884 | 0.99 |
| Independent | Armando Macalintal | 5,791 | 0.83 |
| Independent | Nestor Reyes, Jr. | 5,675 | 0.82 |
| Independent | Greg Mercado | 4,871 | 0.70 |
| Independent | Ding Uri | 4,616 | 0.66 |
| Independent | Kalbo Dumaraos | 4,384 | 0.63 |
| PDP–Laban | Jeffrey Cruz | 4,297 | 0.62 |
| Independent | Delon Tan | 4,079 | 0.59 |
| Invalid or blank votes | | | |
| Total votes | | 102,373 | 100 |
