= Malungon =

Municipality in Sarangani, Philippines

- Municipality
- Municipality of Malungon

Other transcription(s)
  - Jawi: ملوڠون
- Seal

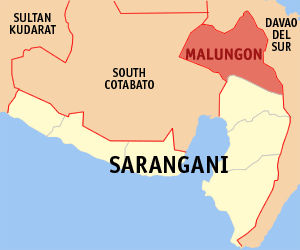
- Map of Sarangani with Malungon highlighted
- Interactive map of Malungon
- Location within the Philippines
- Coordinates: 6°22′39″N 125°16′22″E
- Country: Philippines
- Region: Soccsksargen
- Province: Sarangani
- District: Lone District
- Barangays: 31 (see Barangays)

Government
  - Type: Sangguniang Bayan
  - Mayor: Reynaldo F. Constantino
  - Vice Mayor: Maria Theresa D. Constantino
  - Representative: Steve Solon
  - Municipal Council: Members: Evelyn B. Alegario; Danilo F. Constantino; Victor M. Padernilla; Cesar B. Nallos Jr.; Erwin A. Asgapo; Benjamin P. Santos; Joey L. Espinosa; Rodrigo V. Palec Jr.
  - Electorate: 71,045 voters (2025)

Area
  - Total: 750.92 km^{2} (289.93 sq mi)
- Elevation: 233 m (764 ft)
- Highest elevation: 726 m (2,382 ft)
- Lowest elevation: 102 m (335 ft)

Population (2024 census)
  - Total: 108,429
  - Density: 144.39/km^{2} (373.98/sq mi)
  - Households: 25,809
- Demonym: Malungonian

Economy
  - Income class: 1st municipal income class
  - Poverty incidence: 22.94% (2023)
  - Revenue: ₱ 516.9 million (2024)
  - Assets: ₱ 852.2 million (2024)
  - Expenditure: ₱ 481.9 million (2024)
  - Liabilities: ₱ 347.9 million (2024)

Service provider
  - Electricity: South Cotabato 2 Electric Cooperative (SOCOTECO 2)
- Time zone: UTC+8 (PST)
- ZIP code: 9503
- PSGC: 1208007000
- IDD : area code: +63 (0)83
- Native languages: Cebuano; Tboli; Maguindanao; Blaan; Tagalog , Tagakaulo
- Website: malungon.gov.ph

Malungon, officially the Municipality of Malungon (Note: Blaan: Banwé Malungon Sinugboanon: Lungsod sa Malungon Mëgindënëwn: Inged nu Malungun Tboli: Benwu Malungon Tagakolu: Lunsud na Malungon Hiligaynon: Banwa sang Malungon Ilokano: Ili ti Malungon Filipino: Munisipalidad ng Malungon), is a municipality in the province of Sarangani, Philippines. According to the 2024 census, it has a population of 108,429 people.

The only landlocked municipality in Sarangani, Malungon lies in the north-eastern part of the province. It is bounded on the west by Tupi, South Cotabato, on the north by the province of Davao del Sur, east by Malita, capital of the newly created province of Davao Occidental, on the south by Alabel (the provincial capital) and General Santos, and on the south-west by Polomolok, South Cotabato.

Malungon has also marked milestones such as its foundation anniversary, which has been covered in national media.

== History ==
Malungon was created as a municipality through Republic Act No. 5522, which was approved on June 21, 1969. It was formerly part of the municipality of General Santos, then under the province of South Cotabato before the creation of Sarangani Province.

== Geography ==
=== Barangays ===
Malungon is politically subdivided into 31 barangays. Each barangay consists of puroks while some have sitios.

- Alkikan
- Ampon
- Atlae
- Banahaw
- Banate
- Blaan
- Datal Batong
- Datal Bila
- Datal Tampal
- J.P. Laurel
- Kawayan
- Kibala
- Kiblat
- Kinabalan
- Lower Mainit
- Lutay
- Malabod
- Malalag Cogon
- Malandag
- Malungon Gamay
- Nagpan
- Panamin
- Poblacion
- San Juan
- San Miguel
- San Roque
- Talus
- Tamban
- Upper Biangan
- Upper Lumabat
- Upper Mainit

=== Climate ===
Climate data for Malungon, Sarangani
| Month | Jan | Feb | Mar | Apr | May | Jun | Jul | Aug | Sep | Oct | Nov | Dec | Year |
|---|---|---|---|---|---|---|---|---|---|---|---|---|---|
| Mean daily maximum °C (°F) | 30 (86) | 30 (86) | 31 (88) | 31 (88) | 30 (86) | 29 (84) | 29 (84) | 29 (84) | 30 (86) | 30 (86) | 30 (86) | 30 (86) | 30 (86) |
| Mean daily minimum °C (°F) | 22 (72) | 22 (72) | 22 (72) | 23 (73) | 24 (75) | 24 (75) | 23 (73) | 23 (73) | 24 (75) | 24 (75) | 23 (73) | 23 (73) | 23 (73) |
| Average precipitation mm (inches) | 54 (2.1) | 41 (1.6) | 56 (2.2) | 81 (3.2) | 154 (6.1) | 212 (8.3) | 223 (8.8) | 218 (8.6) | 192 (7.6) | 184 (7.2) | 135 (5.3) | 73 (2.9) | 1,623 (63.9) |
| Average rainy days | 10.4 | 9.1 | 11.2 | 14.4 | 24.6 | 27.0 | 26.7 | 26.1 | 25.6 | 26.9 | 22.6 | 15.1 | 239.7 |
Source: Meteoblue

== Demographics ==
Population census of Malungon
| Year | Pop. | ±% p.a. |
|---|---|---|
| 1970 | 13,629 | — |
| 1975 | 30,060 | +17.19% |
| 1980 | 38,677 | +5.17% |
| 1990 | 57,982 | +4.13% |
| 1995 | 92,433 | +9.13% |
| 2000 | 93,232 | +0.18% |
| 2007 | 95,993 | +0.40% |
| 2010 | 95,044 | −0.36% |
| 2015 | 103,604 | +1.66% |
| 2020 | 105,465 | +0.38% |
| 2024 | 108,429 | +0.67% |
Source: Philippine Statistics Authority

== Economy ==
Poverty incidence of Malungon (%)

Source: Philippine Statistics Authority

Malungon's economy is largely based on agriculture with a high level production of dried coconut meat. Animal husbandry is the second biggest income earner, notably cattle farming. Other agricultural products are coconuts, maize, sugarcane, bananas, pineapples, mangoes, pork, eggs, beef, and fish.

The economy has accelerated in the past decade driven by advances in global communication technology and the finishing of a modern highway that tremendously improved trade and transport.

Malungon was among the municipalities recognized at the 2025 Philippine Model Cities and Municipalities awards and forum organized by The Manila Times.

The municipality was also included as one of the stops in the Philippine Experience Program, a tourism initiative highlighting cultural and heritage sites across the country.

The municipality has also been featured in national media for its scenic locations, including areas noted for their resemblance to cherry blossom landscapes.

Malungon was among the municipalities recognized at the 2025 Philippine Model Cities and Municipalities awards and forum organized by The Manila Times.

The municipality was included as one of the stops in the Philippine Experience Program, a tourism initiative highlighting cultural and heritage sites across the country.

National media outlets have likewise featured scenic locations in Malungon, including areas noted for their resemblance to cherry blossom landscapes.

Malungon has been included in national competitiveness assessments through the Cities and Municipalities Competitiveness Index (CMCI) conducted by the Department of Trade and Industry.
