= Olongapo City National High School =

Public high school in Olongapo, Philippines

- Pambansang Mataas na Paaralan ng Lungsod ng Olongapo (Filipino)

Location
- Rizal Avenue corner 14th Street, East Tapinac; Olongapo City, Zambales; Philippines
- 14°50′07″N 120°16′54″E

Information
- Type: Public Secondary
- Established: June 3, 1946
- Principal: Dr. Sandy T. Cabarle Ed.D.
- Area: 18,993 square meter
- Nickname: OCNHS, Jackson
- Newspaper: Ang Buklod (Filipino); The Anchor (English)
- Website: https://olongapocitynhs.com/

Olongapo City National High School is one of the biggest schools in Olongapo City, Philippines. It has an average population of 5,530 students. It is located in the central part of Olongapo City along Rizal Avenue, corner 14th Street, East Tapinac with a total service area of 18,993 square meters.

== History ==
Olongapo City National High School traces its humble beginning as a Reservation High School established on June 3, 1946, back when the municipality of Olongapo was still under the United States Reservation Administration. The time when Filipinos were at the height of rehabilitation from World War II. It started as the Reservation High School with an initial enrollment of 320 students under the United States (US) Naval Reservation Administration. For sometime, it was called JK Jackson High School in honor of US Reservation Commander, Captain JK Jackson who during the time of its establishment was the senior officer in charge.

Later on, it was called Olongapo High School but was still under the administration of the US Naval Reservation. As the municipality of Olongapo was populated and flourished due to economic activities brought by the expansion of the US Ship Repair Facility (SRF) and other port and military services during Korean War, the demand to turn over the town to Zambales Provincial government for added provincial revenues became stronger. Under the United States- Republic of the Philippines Military Base Agreement of 1954, the municipality and Olongapo High School were officially turned over to the provincial government in 1959.

On June 1, 1966, the school was renamed Olongapo City High School upon the passage of Republic Act 4645 - the law converting the municipality of Olongapo into a chartered city. The school was once again renamed as Olongapo City National High School in September 1972 and carries the same name to the present.

It offers various curricula for high school students designed to develop individual learning inclinations and interests, discover talent in journalism, creative arts, to learn foreign languages and stress discipline in the field of sports as well as physical sciences. It also opens its doors to non-conventional educational programs such as distance and special educations.

== Principal ==
School Year	Name	Official name of School
1946–1947	Maximo Adamos	Reservation High School
1947–1949	Guillermo Alonzo	Reservation High School
1949–1952	Zacarias Beltran	Olongapo Reservation High School
1952–1955	Martin B. Austria	J.K. Jackson High School
1955–1962	Quirino Barbo	Olongapo High School
1962–1965	Zacarias Beltran	Olongapo Provincial High School
1965–1966	Filemon Legaspi	Olongapo Provincial High School
1966–1972	Filemon Legaspi	Olongapo City High School
1972–1983	Lydia De Leon Salas	Olongapo City National High School
1983–1990	Veronica L. Cava	Olongapo City National High School
1990–1991	Norma P. Castillo	Olongapo City National High School
1991–1997	Rosalina N. Gabrito	Olongapo City National High School
1997–2012	Helen B. Aggabao	Olongapo City National High School
2012–2016	Leonardo P. De Guzman	Olongapo City National High School
2016–2019	Eva P. Unay	Olongapo City National High School
2019–2021	Espiridion F. Ordonio	Olongapo City National High School
2021-2023	Soledad E. Pozon	Olongapo City National High School
2023-2024	Roderick A. Tadeo	Olongapo City National High School
2024–present	Sandy T. Cabarle	Olongapo City National High School

== See also ==
- Regional Science High School III
- Kalalake National High School
