= Regional Science High School for Region VI =

Public high school in Aklan, Philippines

- Mataas na Paaralan ng Agham Panrehiyon ng Rehiyon VI
- Regionalium Scientia Alta Schola
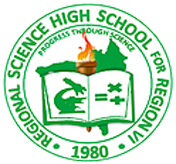

Location
- Old Buswang; Western Visayas; Kalibo, Aklan; Philippines; 11°43′18″N 122°22′49″E

Information
- School type: Science High School
- Motto: Scientia Et Virtus ("Knowledge And Virtue")
- Established: 1980
- Founder: Dr. Constancio I. Constantino
- School district: Kalibo II
- School number: 302332
- Principal: Maria Santia A. Arboleda
- Grades: 7 to 12
- Colors: Green and White
- Nickname: Sayans, RegSci, Regional Science, ADHS
- Publication: Scholar's Gazette (English) Pahayagang Iskolar (Filipino)
- Affiliations: Department of Education - Division of Aklan; Regional Science High School Union
- Website: http://www.rshsvi.edu.ph

The Regional Science High School for Region VI (formerly Aklan Development High School (ADHS) / Science Development High School of Aklan (SDHSA) / Science Development National High School (SDNHS) is a public secondary science school supervised by the Department of Education. It is located in Old Buswang, Kalibo, Aklan, Philippines.

== History ==
Dr. Constancio I. Constantino, then Chairman of the Committee on Education and Culture of the Sangguniang Panlalawigan of the Province of Aklan, in 1979 conceived the idea of establishing a provincial high school for the intellectually gifted and science-mathematics oriented youth of the province.

Former Governor Roberto Q. Garcia issued an Executive Order creating a steering committee to study and work for the establishment of the school.

The Sangguniang Panlalawigan, during the 45th regular session approved Resolution No.178, s. 1979 on December 7, 1979 which authorized the establishment of ADHS.

ADHS was modeled after the Manila Science High School which offers Special Science Secondary Education Curriculum with selective admission and retention requirements for students.

The authority to operate the first year class was endorsed by School Division Superintendent Joaquin Tesoro and was approved by Minister Onofre D. Corpus on March 11, 1980. The first year class consisted of 37 scholars who were selected based on a competitive admission test administered by the Science Foundation of the Philippines Center No.6.

The class was formally opened by the MEC Regional Director Antonio B. Tanchuan on June 9, 1980 for the school year 1980-81 and temporarily housed at the Bagong Lipunan Building of the Kalibo Pilot Elementary School.

The second, third and fourth years were progressively organized every succeeding year thereafter. The school was transferred to its temporary site at the Provincial Capitol compound in the school year 1981–82.

=== Science Development High School of Aklan ===
In school year 1982–83, a resolution requested a change from the name Aklan Development High School to Science Development High School of Aklan (SDHSA) to make it more suggestive of its Special Science Secondary Education Curriculum.

Approval of the change of name was signed by MEC Minister Onofre D. Corpus on December 23, 1982.

On June 21, 1991, the Sangguniang Panlalawigan approved a resolution donating a portion of one hectare of the real property acquired by the provincial government from the Development Bank of the Philippines to the SDHSA and authorizing the provincial governor to execute the Deed of Donation.

The Deed of Donation was entered into by and between the Provincial Government of Aklan and the Department of Education, Culture and Sports-Science Development National High School of Aklan, on July 11, 1991. The newly acquired school site is located in Barangay Old Buswang, Kalibo, Aklan.

The P3.2 Million DECS-SEDP consists of an administration office, four academic classrooms, library, laboratory and home economics room.

The new school site was inaugurated on October 4, 1993. SDHSA was then changed to Science Development National High School (SDNHS) due to the order of the Department of Education, Culture and Sports that all Barangay high schools should be named as national high schools.

A permanent extension classroom and guard house (through the effort of PTCA) were built in 1994–1995. Two more classrooms were constructed in 1995. Because of the growing population of the SDNHS, makeshift classrooms made of nipa and bamboo were built, four in 1994 and two in 1995, through the efforts of parents.

Gradually, classrooms made of light materials were demolished to give way to more permanent structures. In 1996, a science laboratory was constructed and each year thereafter, classrooms were built under the DECS Regular School Building Program. In March 1997, four classrooms funded out of the CDF of Senator Edgardo Angara were built.

=== Regional Science High School of Region VI ===
The school was converted into a Regional Science High School in 1999. With this conversion, the school caters to the needs of students who are scientifically and mathematically inclined, not just in the province of Aklan but also throughout Region VI.

It now houses the Provincial Adolescent Health and Youth Development Program Center of Aklan (AHYDP-Teen Center).

== Admission ==
=== Admission for Junior High School ===
Students who belong to the upper 10% of the Grade VI graduating class, recommended by their respective principals are qualified to take the entrance exam.

To acquire an entrance examination form, examinees should have:

- A final grade of 85% in English, Science and Mathematics
- A final grade of 83% in all other learning areas, and
- A weighted average of at least 85%.

Students should maintain a grade of 85 for major subjects and 83 in minor subjects. Students failing to meet this requirement used to beput under probation for the following year, but now failing to meet the requirements are due to disqualification and required to transfer to another school by the end of the school year.

For Senior High School students, failing to meet the required grade results to immediate disqualification.

=== Transfer ===
Only students who have maintained the grade requirement set for RSHS shall be allowed to transfer laterally, that is, from one RSHS to another. Transfer from general high school to the RSHS is not allowed in any curriculum year.

== Background ==
=== Faculty and Administration ===
Since its establishment, the institution had Dr. Concepcion P. Constantino as its principal until July 2009. The current principal is Merlyn S. Carrillo. Maria Santia A. Arboleda is the incumbent Principal II.

== Academics ==
=== Curriculum ===
The school implements the specialized science curriculum mandated by the Department of Education (DepEd). In compliance with DepEd Order No. 010, s. 2024, the Junior High School tier (Grades 7–10) follows the MATATAG Curriculum framework. This framework is heavily enriched with advanced mathematics, computer science, and scientific research methodologies that build upon the historical foundations originally established under DepEd Order No. 49, s. 2003.

At the Senior High School tier (Grades 11–12), the school has transitioned away from traditional, rigid K-to-12 strands under the Strengthened Senior High School Curriculum. It now operates on a flexible, major-based elective system.

=== Junior high school ===
There are a number of 5 classes (sections) for each grade level.

Minimum of 30 and a maximum of 50 students per class for better instruction and improved laboratory work.

=== Senior High School ===
Regional Science High School for Region VI only offers the STEM (Science, Technology, Engineering and Mathematics) and ABM (Accountancy and Business Management) strands of the Academic Track.

Senior High School students are catered in four (4) classes for the STEM strand and a single class for the ABM strand.

=== Strengthened SHS Curriculum ===
However, in alignment with the national transition to the Strengthened Senior High School Curriculum under DepEd Memorandum No. 012, s. 2026, traditional rigid tracking (such as the standard STEM and ABM strands) has been replaced by a modular elective system. While core general subjects are consolidated to maximize specialized instructional focus, students choose concentrated elective clusters tailored to advanced scientific and corporate career paths. RSHS VI notably organizes its specialized academic curriculum into four localized elective configurations:

=== BioChemistry (Sections Linnaeus & Franklin) ===
Focused on molecular biology, chemical processes within living organisms, and laboratory analytical techniques designed for medical and biotechnological career paths.

=== BioPhysics (Section Leeuwenhoek) ===
Emphasizing biological systems analyzed through the laws of physics, biomechanics, and bio-energetics.

=== ChemPhysics (Section Jenner) ===
A heavy mathematical and experimental combination focusing on physical chemistry, thermodynamics, quantum mechanics basics, and analytical engineering foundations.

=== Accountancy (Section Mendel) ===
Curated for students aiming toward corporate finance, mathematical economics, and enterprise management, providing advanced foundations in data analytics and financial reporting.

=== Publications ===
- The Scholar's Gazette - official student publication in English
- Ang Pahayagang Iskolar - official student publication in Filipino

== Sports ==
=== 2020 ===
Alexander Salvador of the RSHS-VI Basketball Boys represented the Unit V in the Aklan provincial athletic meet, winning the championship later on. The 3x3 Basketball girls also won the Provincial trophy, a team composed of Rachelle Serrato, Esther Amador, and Feby Talaguit. They were set to battle for the Western Visayas Regional Athletic Association meet, but the event was cancelled due to the Coronavirus disease 2019 pandemic.

=== Rythmic Gymnastics ===
Leighanne Militar Jizmundo at the 2025 Western Visayas Regional Athletic Association (WVRAA) Meet in Antique, dominated the Secondary Level for Dance Sports by securing four silver medals (Hoop, Clubs, Individual All-Around, and Team Play) alongside two bronze medals (Ball and Ribbon). This powerhouse performance officially punched her ticket to her first Palarong Pambansa.

=== Competitive Swimming ===
Nuche Veronica V Ibit recorded one of the most dominant seasons in junior swimming history in 2025, securing 70 medals (56 gold, 10 silver, and 4 bronze) and shattering 3 national meet records. For Palarong Pambansa 2025 (Laoag City, Ilocos Norte) She won 4 gold medals and 2 silver medals. She broke the national meet record in the 50-meter freestyle and anchored the Western Visayas team to break the national record in the 4×50-meter freestyle relay. For Batang Pinoy 2025, she swept 5 gold medals and was recognized as the Most Outstanding Swimmer after establishing a new national meet record in the 50-meter freestyle. For the 14th ASEAN School Games, she represented the Philippine national junior team, successfully making the finals and finishing in the top 8 across 4 distinct events.

=== Rythmic Gymnastics ===
Leighanne Militar Jizmundo snatched the Gold Medal in the Secondary Girls Clubs category at WVRAA 2026 Meet. She then advanced to the Palarong Pambansa 2026 held in Agusan del Sur, where she secured the prestigious National Silver Medal in the same category.

Competing alongside Leighanne, Yvainne Shannon I. Briones at the 2026 Western Visayas Regional Athletic Association (WVRAA) Meet delivered a spectacular performance across individual and team events. She brought home an impressive haul of medals, notably:A gold medal in the Team Event, silver medals in Hoop and Ribbon, and Bronze Medals in Ball, Clubs, and Individual All-Around (IAA). Yvainne Shannon qualified as an official Region VI delegate for the 2026 Palarong Pambansa. Competing against the top athletes in the country, she successfully advanced through a pool of 54 gymnasts to become a Ribbon Finals Qualifier.

=== Competitive Swimming ===
Nuche Veronica V Ibit took home the Gold Medal in the Secondary Girls' 100m Freestyle at Palarong Pambansa 2026 (Agusan del Sur) on May 28, 2026. She also secured Bronze Medals in the 200m Freestyle and 50m Butterfly. For WVRAA Meet 2026 (Passi City), she captured the Gold Medal in the Secondary Girls' 50-meter Butterfly. For the 4th South East Asian Open Water Championship (August 2026), she transitioned into open-water competition, securing a 4th-place finish for the Philippines in the 14-18 mixed relay division alongside teammates Alexander Chu, Graziella Sophia Ato, and Anton Paulo Dominick Della.

== Awards and recognitions ==
=== Faculty and Mentorship Honors ===
The school has produced two Metrobank Foundation Inc. awardees in the search for Outstanding Teachers of the Philippines namely, Dioso A. Torre in 1993, and Ruby Agnes B. Estrada in 1999 respectively.

=== Institutional and Program Awards ===
- Outstanding Public Secondary School: Recognized at the DepEd Aklan Pagkilaea Awards for performance and governance.
- CIRCLE Award: Named Western Visayas Regional Champion for Learning Excellence as a top learning-focused secondary school.
- WinS Three-Star School & GAD Implementer: Recognized for top standards in Water, Sanitation, and Hygiene (WinS) and inclusive Gender and Development (GAD) execution.

=== Academic and Scientific Congresses ===
- Science Fairs & Congresses: Regularly secures Overall Champion titles at the Division Science Congress and top placements at the Regional Science and Technology Fair (RSTF) in Life and Physical Sciences.
- Student Journalism: Student publications excel at the Regional Schools Press Conference (RSPC), notably sweeping categories in Radio Script Writing and Broadcasting.

=== Cultural and Extracurricular Triumphs ===
- Kalibo Ati-Atihan Festival: Achieved a four-peat championship (2022-2026) in Sinaot sa Calle it mga Inungang Ati, winning best mass demonstration, costume, and artistry.

=== Student Athletics and Student Leadership ===
- Athletics: Students represent Western Visayas at regional and national meets like the WVRAA and Palarong Pambansa, securing multiple medals.
- Leadership & Scholarships: Graduates receive honors such as the Gerry Roxas Leadership Award and national EBEST scholar recognitions.
