= Alabel National Science High School =

Public high school in Sarangani, Philippines

- Mataas na Pambansang Paaralan ng Agham ng Alabel (Filipino)
- Regionalium Scientia Alta Schola

Location
- Alabel, Sarangani Province; Philippines; 6°05′59″N 125°16′29″E

Information
- Other name: Regional Science High School for Region XII
- Type: Science High School
- Motto: Scientia et Virtus ("Knowledge and Virtue")
- Established: 1995
- Language: English, Filipino
- Colors: Black and Yellow
- Nickname: ANSHS, AlSci
- Affiliations: Department of Education - Division of Sarangani Province; Regional Science High School Union

Alabel National Science High School is the Regional Science High School for Region XII situated in Alabel, Sarangani, Philippines.

== History ==
Alabel National Science High School was established in Alabel, Sarangani Province through RA 8078, authored by the late Congressman James Chiongbian. It was conceived in 1995, primarily, to cater the intellectually capable students of Sarangani Province and nearby areas. Classes were formally organized and began on June 3, 1996. Students are intensively screened and mostly belong to the upper 10% of the graduating pupils of the elementary schools in the region.

The school started its operation with zero budget. Funds for the maintenance and operation of the school were sourced out from private individuals, GOs, NGOs and LGUs of Alabel, Malapatan, and Sarangani Province. Textbooks, books, chairs and other school needs were provided by nearby high schools and DECS Division Office. Teachers were borrowed from Alabel National High School and it was staffed on a part-time basis by the principal of Kling National High School.

The school received its first budget in CY 1997, with appropriations for salaries of three teacher items and ₱45,000 allotment for school maintenance and other operating expenses (MOOE), until finally, the school was allotted appropriations for salaries of four teacher items and ₱1,122,000.00 for MOOE in the 1999 General Appropriation Act.

On June 1, 1999, through DECS Order No. 58, the school was designated as the Regional Science High School for Region XI effective SY 1999–2000, in replacement of Philippine Science High School in Mintal, Davao City which was previously identified as the Regional Science Competition.

During SY 1999–2000, the school has finally occupied its newly constructed building worth ₱5 million, erected at a 5-hectare school site donated by the benevolent Alcantara Family. The school has a water system and school cafeteria with a total budget of ₱3 million. This project, worth ₱8 million, was constructed through the CDF of the late Hon. Congressman James Chiongbian.

On August 6, 2002, when the Soccsksargen area was turned over to Region XII, the Alabel National Science High School became the Regional Science High School for Region XII.
