= Regional Science High School III =

Public high school in Olongapo, Philippines

- Mataas na Paaralan ng Agham Panrehiyon ng Rehiyon III (Filipino)
- Regionalium Scientia Alta Schola

Location
- Olongapo City, Zambales; Philippines; 14°50′20″N 120°18′48″E

Information
- Type: Science High School
- Motto: Scientia Vinces (Through Knowledge, We Win)
- Established: 1994
- Principal: Soledad E. Pozon
- Grades: 7 to 12
- Language: English, Filipino
- Campus: East Kalayaan, Subic Bay Freeport Zone, Olongapo City
- Colors: Blue and Black
- Nickname: RegSci, Reggies
- Affiliations: Schools Division Office of Olongapo City; Regional Science High School Union; Department of Education (Philippines)
- School Publications: The Eagle (English); Ang Sanghaya (Filipino)

Regional Science High School III (commonly known as RSHS III) is a science high school situated in East Kalayaan, within the Subic Bay Freeport Zone, in Olongapo City, Philippines. Established in 1994, the school offers a specialized science and mathematics-oriented curriculum tailored for academically adept adolescents. RSHS III comprises a junior high school and a senior high school with a focus on the STEM strand. The student body primarily consists of residents from nearby cities and provinces, with the majority hailing from Olongapo, Bataan, and Zambales.

Since then, it has clinched various awards and representation in STEM-related competitions (Math, Science, Research) both in the national and international level

== History ==
Regional Science High Schools were established in the Philippines under DECS Order No. 69 Series of 1993. These schools cater to above-average students with a strong inclination towards science and technology. They offer an advanced curriculum in Science, Math, and English, along with enriched programs and research opportunities not typically available in regular schools.

Originally situated at Angeles City High School in Angeles City, the school was later moved to Olongapo City National High School before officially opening its doors on June 6, 1994. Under the leadership of then-Olongapo Mayor Kate H. Gordon and SBMA Chairman Richard J. Gordon, the school was relocated once again to the former U.S. Naval Base Subic Bay within the Subic Bay Freeport Zone in Olongapo City, near present-day Mondriaan Aura College.

The school was again moved to its present location, in a former elementary school in East Kalayaan.

The building was initially constructed in the late 1950s by the United States Navy for the education of their dependent children and was originally named George Dewey Elementary School. It was later renamed Kalayaan Elementary School and operated under the administration of the Philippine Department of Defense.

== Environment ==
The Regional Science High School is situated within one of the Philippines' remaining natural rainforests in the Subic Bay Freeport Zone, with an untouched forest reserve beyond the school fence. The existing school buildings were originally constructed for the education of U.S. naval officers' children during the American colonial occupation and have remained largely unchanged since then. Only a few structures on the campus were modified to accommodate the relocation of the high school.

== Exchange programs ==
Since 2014, 12 students from Regional Science High School have participated as International Student Ambassadors and student exchange delegates to Tallwood High School in Virginia Beach, USA, as part of the Olongapo City-Virginia Beach Sister Cities Agreement program.

== Panorama ==
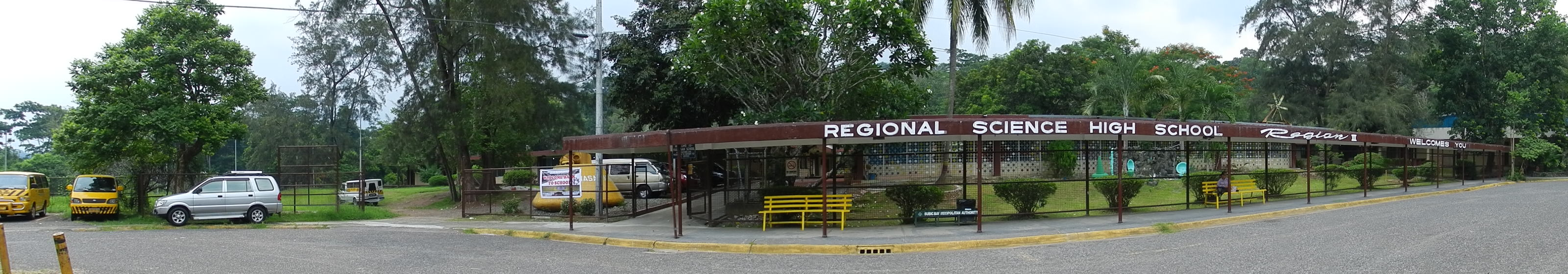
Panoramic view of Regional Science High School III on June 3, 2013.
