= Regional Science High School for Region 2 =

Public high school in Isabela, Philippines

Regional Science High School for Region 02
- Mataas na Paaralan ng Agham Panrehiyon ng Rehiyon II (Filipino)
- Official seal of the Regional Science High School for Region 02

Location
- Tumauini, Isabela; Philippines; 17°16′N 121°49′E

Information
- Former names: Tumauini National High School-NSEC RSHS Annex
- Type: Public specialized high school
- Motto: Scientia Et Virtus ("Knowledge and Virtue")
- Established: 1994
- Principal: Honorato A. Malabad Jr.
- Language: English, Filipino
- Campus: Camp Samal, Arcon, Tumauini, Isabela
- Colors: Blue and white
- Nickname: Regsay Dos / RegScie
- Affiliations: Regional Science High School Union

Regional Science High School for Region 2 (RSHS Region II) is a public, specialized secondary school located at Camp Samal, Arcon, Tumauini, Isabela, in the Cagayan Valley Region of the Philippines. It is under the Regional Science High School Union. It is supervised by the Department of Education. Its principal is Honorato Malabad. RSHS curriculum specializes in science and mathematics.

The Regional Science High School for Region 2 traces its origins to the 1994–1995 school year, when it was established as an annex of Isabela National High School. It was initially housed at Tumauini National High School, which served as the mother school during its formative years.

In its first year of operation, the school admitted 79 pioneering students, most of whom came from Tumauini, Isabela. Several others traveled from neighboring provinces such as Cagayan, reflecting the school's emerging regional significance as a center for advanced secondary education in science and mathematics. During this period, Ms. Nelia Z. Anguluan served as the Officer-in-Charge (OIC), overseeing the school's early development.

Classes were conducted in a newly constructed two-story Secondary Education Development Program (SEDP) building within the Tumauini National High School campus. Due to limited financial resources, the school shared facilities—including classrooms, science laboratories, and educational equipment—with its mother institution.

The RSHS Hymn, which symbolizes the school's identity and spirit, was inspired by the Our Lady of Guibang Hymn, reflecting the cultural and spiritual heritage of the region.

Later on, the school transferred to its permanent site at Camp Samal, Barangay Arcon, Tumauini, Isabela, where it continues to stand today as a hub for science-focused secondary education in Cagayan Valley.

As one of the pioneering Regional Science High Schools in the country, RSHS Region 2 has consistently upheld a legacy of academic excellence. It remains one of the top-performing secondary schools in the region, excelling in various local and national competitions in mathematics, scientific research, campus journalism, and even sports. This well-rounded performance highlights the institution’s commitment to producing not only academically gifted students but also well-rounded individuals.

Over the years, the school has been led by a number of dedicated administrators. Notable past principals include Inocencio T. Balag, Fabio M. Macalling Jr., Peter Batarao, Nelia Z. Anguluan, Evelyn Bumanglag, Romel L. Ricardo, Victor C. Allam, and Junapoli A. Tumolva, whose leadership has contributed to the sustained growth and prestige of the institution.

== Admission ==
Students who belong to the upper 10% of the 6th-grade graduating class, recommended by their respective principals, are eligible to take the entrance exam.

To acquire an entrance examination form, examinees must have:

- A final grade of 85% in English, Science, and Mathematics.
- A final grade of 83% in all other learning areas, and
- A weighted average of at least 85%.

Students must maintain a grade of 85 for major subjects and 83 for minor subjects. Students failing to meet this requirement are put on probation for the following year. Students still failing to meet the requirements are subject to disqualification and to transfer to another school by the end of the school year.

== Curriculum ==
The school follows the curriculum by the Department of Education, the Enhanced K to 12 Curriculum, as of the school year 2012–2013, and the Curricula of English, Science, and Mathematics are enriched by additional subjects and electives prescribed in DepEd Order no. 49, s. 2003.
