= Cavite Science Integrated School =

Public high school in Cavite, Philippines

- Mataas na Paaralang Pang-Agham ng Kabite (Filipino)
- Instituto Regional de Ciencia de la Region Calabarzon - Escuela Secundaria Nacional de Ciencia del Cavite

Location
- Maragondon, Cavite; Philippines; 14°16′24″N 120°44′18″E

Information
- Former names: Cavite National Science High School; Cavite Provincial Science High School
- School type: Science high school
- Motto: We Engage. We Explore. We Excel.
- Established: 1981
- Principal: Dr. Joie E. Buendia
- Grades: 7–12
- Language: English, Filipino, Spanish
- Campus: Governor's Drive, Garita-B, Maragondon, Philippines
- Colors: Blue and White
- Nickname: CavSci, RegSci
- Publication: The Molecules (English); Ang Molekyuls (Filipino)
- Affiliation: Schools Division - Cavite; Regional Science High School Union

The Cavite Science Integrated School (Filipino: Pambansang Mataas na Paaralang Pang-Agham ng Kabite), formerly known as Cavite Provincial Science High School & Cavite National Science High School, is a secondary public science high school located in Garita-B (beside Maragondon Elementary School), Maragondon, Cavite in the Philippines. It is the Regional Science High School for Region IV-A.
