= Davao Oriental Regional Science High School =

Public high school in Davao Oriental, Philippines

Location
- Government Center, Dahican, Mati City, Davao Oriental 8200; Philippines; 6°56′35″N 126°15′28″E

Information
- School type: Public Regional Science High School
- Established: 2009
- Principal: Flavia T. Latras
- Grades: 7 to 12
- Enrollment: 578
- Affiliations: Schools Division of the City of Mati; Regional Science High School Union; Department of Education

Davao Oriental Regional Science High School (Filipino: Mataas na Paaralan ng Agham Panrehiyon ng Davao Oriental) (School I.D. 304328) is a public science high school supervised by the Department of Education. The school was established on May 28, 2009, through the R.A. No. 9630 as the Regional Science High School for Region XI: Davao Region. It is located in Mati City, Davao Oriental, Philippines. The school is colloquially known as "DORSHS", "RegSci", or simply "RS".

== History ==
Formerly known as Gov. Leopoldo Lopez Memorial Science High School, in 2002, it was designated as the Regional Science High School for Region XI (Davao Region) by virtue of Dep. Ed order no. 48 s. 2002. In 2009, through Republic Act 9630, the school's name was changed to Davao Oriental Regional Science High School.

== Admission ==
Students who belong to upper 10% of the Grade 6 graduating class, recommended by their respective principals are qualified to take the entrance exam.

To acquire an entrance examination form, examinees should have:

- A final grade of 85% in English, Science and Mathematics
- A final grade of 83% in all other learning areas, and
- A weighted average of at least 85%.

Students should maintain a grade of 85 for major subjects and 83 in minor subjects. If a student fails to meet this requirement, they would be put under probation for the following year. If the student still fails to meet the requirements they will be disqualified, and are to transfer to another school by the end of the school year.

=== Curriculum ===
The school is following the new curriculum by the Department of Education, the Enhanced K to 12 Curriculum, as of the school year 2012-2013 and Curricula of English, Science and Mathematics shall be enriched by additional subjects and electives prescribed in DepEd Order no. 49, s. 2003.
