= Bicol Regional Science High School =

Public high school in Albay, Philippines

- Mataas na Paaralan ng Agham Panrehiyon ng Bicol (Filipino)
- Bicol Regional Science High School

Location
- Ligao City, Albay; Philippines; 13°14′19″N 123°32′56″E

Information
- Type: Regional Science High School
- Motto: A School Where Quality is a Habit and Excellence is a Lifestyle
- Established: 1994
- Principal: Rene P. Preña
- Enrollment: 758 (all levels)
- Language: English, Filipino
- Campus: Tuburan, Ligao City, Albay
- Colors: Green and yellow
- Nickname: Brisay, BriSci, BR, BRSHS
- Newspaper: The Matrix (English); Ang Hulmahan (Filipino)
- Affiliations: Department of Education - Schools Division Office of Ligao City; Regional Science High School Union

Bicol Regional Science High School (Filipino: Mataas na Paaralan ng Agham Panrehiyon ng Bicol) (colloquially BRSHS) is the Regional Science High School for Bicol Region (Region V) in the Philippines. It is located in barangay Tuburan, Ligao City, Albay and was established in June 1994.

== History ==
Bicol Regional Science High School (BRSHS) was conceived by virtue of DECS Order No. 69, series of 1993. In the beginning of the school year 1994–1995, students were enrolled in Ligao National High School since BRSHS had no site of its own. The organization used the LNHS's facilities and classrooms for its daily operations.

In 2000, after six years of existence, BRSHS achieved independence and completely separated from its mother school. The institution was then transferred to barangay Tuburan.
