= Regional Science High School for Region 1 =

Public high school in La Union, Philippines

Regional Science High School for Region I
- Mataas na Paaralan ng Agham Panrehiyon ng Rehiyon I
- Regional Science High School I

Location
- Bangar, La Union; Philippines; 16°53′48″N 120°25′53″E

Information
- Former names: Dona Francisca Lacsamana de Ortega Memorial National High School Annex
- Type: Science High School
- Motto: Epitomé of Excellence
- Established: 1994
- Former Principal: (1994 – 2022) Dr. Amerfina D. Nelmida, Secondary School Principal IV
- Former Principal: (2022 – 2024) Dr. Nancy G. Hoggang, Secondary School Principal II
- Principal: (2024 - Present) Dr. Elsie V. Mayo, Secondary School Principal IV
- Assistant Principal: Aurelia S. Garcia, Head Teacher III of the Science Department/OIC-Assistant Principal
- Language: English, Filipino
- Campus: National Highway, Ma. Cristina East, Bangar, La Union
- Colors: Green and Yellow
- Song: RSHS for Region I Hymn
- Nickname: RegSci or RegSay Uno
- Publication: The RSHS Catalyst, Ang Tagatuklas
- Affiliations: Regional Science High School Union
- Former names: DFLOMNHS Special Science Class, SY (1994-1995 to 1996-1997); Regional Science High School, SY (1997-1998 to 2003-2004)

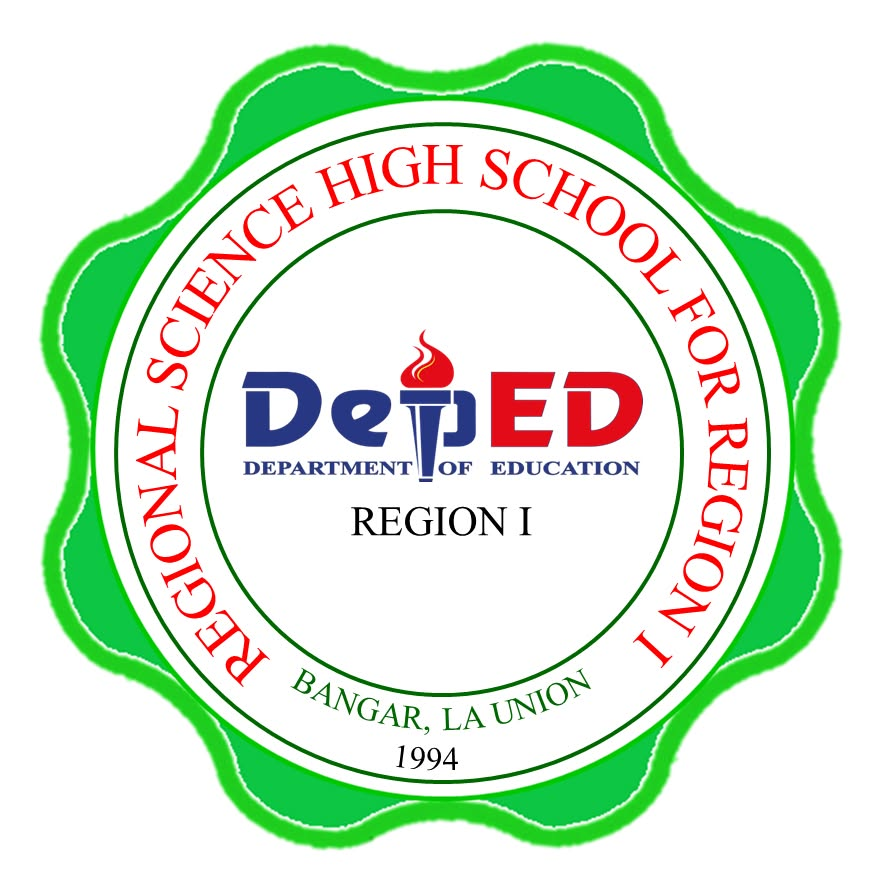

Regional Science High School for Region 1 (RSHS for R1) is a Magnet school of the Department of Education (Philippines), established in 1994 by virtue of DECS Order No. 69, s.1993. The school has a curriculum that specializes in science and research (different from Special Science Program/Engineering and Science Education Program schools).

Facebook Page: https://www.facebook.com/rshsregion1

== History ==
The school started with a single classroom consisting of 60 bright students coming from different provinces in the Ilocos Region, with Dr. Igmedio M. Cariaga as principal. For almost four years, it shared classrooms with its mother school DFLOMNHS located at National Highway, San Blas, Bangar, La Union. Then in July 1998, RSHS moved to its present site at Ma. Cristina East, Bangar, La Union. The RSHS-1 campus was donated by the Municipal Government of Bangar.

== Admission ==
Admission to any RSHS is a three-step screening given to all qualified elementary students. To be eligible for admission, applicants must be Filipino students who belong to the top 10% of the graduating class and must have special aptitude in science and math. The screening includes two examinations and one interview.

== Performance ==
=== NSAT and NAT and other examinations ===
Regional Science High School for Region 1 is one of the top high schools in the National Secondary Assessment Test (NSAT) and National Achievement Test (NAT). Likewise it also maintains a high passing rate in college entrance examinations from top caliber universities in the Philippines, such as: University of the Philippines College Admission Test (UPCAT), Ateneo de Manila University College Entrance Test (ACET), De La Salle University College Entrance Test (DLSU-CET), University of Santo Tomas College Entrance Test (UST-CET) and Saint Louis University- Baguio City College Entrance Examination (SLU-CEE). RSHS-1 seniors also showed good passing rate in the Department of Science and Technology Scholarship Examinations.

=== Competitions ===
- National competitions
  - National Intel Philippine Science Fair
  - National Science and Engineering Fair
  - Philippine Super Quiz bee Science
  - DAMATHS Olympiad
  - National School Press Conference
- International competitions
  - Delegate to the SEAMEO Search for Young Scientists, Penang, Malaysia-July 5–9, 1999
  - Delegate to the 53rd Intel International Science and Engineering Fair, Kentucky, USA – May 12–18, 2002
  - Delegate to the Future Creation Fair, JIII, Tokyo, Japan-August 26–31, 2004

=== National Science and Technology Fair (NSTF) ===
The National Science and Technology Fair (NSTF) is an annual and the most prestigious STEM competition in the Philippines for junior and senior high school students, organized by the Department of Education (DepEd). The fair was conducted on-site again in 2024 following the pandemic.

2026 Finalist @Great Eastern Hotel, Quezon City (March 10–13, 2026)

- Life Science: An individual project developed a novel magneto-microgravity seed priming technique to enhance rice agronomic performance and arsenic tolerance, contributing to improved food security and safety. The study was conducted by Adrian Q. Azada under the mentorship of Rowel P. Lucina.
- Mathematics: The study investigated palindromic patterns in relation to the sum of distinct permutations of four to six non-negative integers, considering the number of digits and the resulting integer sums. The research was conducted by Dhennizze Sofia C. Moster, Stephanie L. Semillano, and Ivanna T. Rapisura under the mentorship of Imelda Canumay.

2025 Finalist @Great Eastern Hotel, Quezon City (March 24–28, 2025)

- Robotics: An individual project on developing an Arduino-based device, ECOSENSE, for identifying levels of Escherichia coli in water systems via colorimetric detection, by Charlson Lacasandile, mentored by Rowel Lucina.
- Mathematics: Continuation of a study on palindromic patterns in relation to non-negative integers and their sums, with applications in cryptography, by Peter John Haboc, Ian Chris Semillano, and Stephanie Semillano, mentored by Imelda Canumay.
- Life Science (Qualifier): An individual plant science project developed “AzoLuse,” a nanocellulose-enhanced biostimulant derived from Azolla and Musa acuminata × balbisiana to enable onion growth in waterlogged and saline clay soil. The study was conducted by Adrian Q. Azada under the mentorship of Leonard Levi L. Suguitan.

2024 Finalist @Sequoia Hotel, Parañaque City (April 1–5, 2024)

- Life Science: An individual plant science project developed “OxyRizon,” a novel biostimulant derived from hydrogen peroxide and Musa acuminata × balbisiana to enable onion growth in waterlogged clay soil. The study was conducted by Adrian Q. Azada under the mentorship of Anna Mae Valdez.
- Mathematics: Investigation of palindromic patterns in relation to permutations, arithmetic sequences, and Fibonacci sequences, conducted by Peter John Haboc, Ian Chris L. Semillano, and Joross P. Lamarca under the mentorship of Imelda Canumay.

== Student opportunities ==
=== Research ===
- Students are given opportunities to conduct original research in the biological, physical, and social sciences, as well as in mathematics, to develop investigative skills and prepare for academic competitions.
- A Research Congress (Final Oral Defense) is held for Grades 9, 10, and 12 featuring external panelists from local universities and statistician teachers (internal). Awards are given for the best research papers, best display boards, and the recognition of the Researcher/s of the Year or Best in Research.
- The school organizes a School Science and Technology Fair to select qualified projects for Division, Regional, and National Science and Technology Fairs, featuring projects in life sciences, physical sciences, robotics, innovation, and mathematics.

=== Journalism (Publications) ===
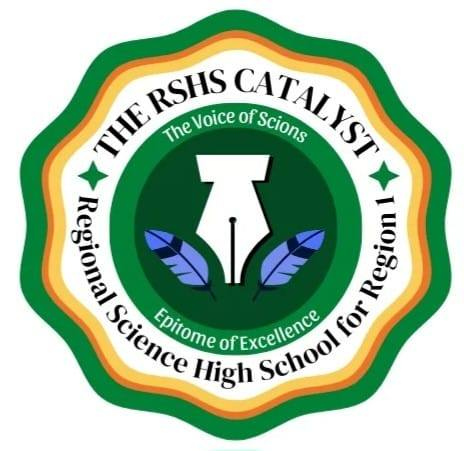
THE RSHS CATALYST

The RSHS Catalyst, the official English Publication - provides students with opportunities to develop skills in writing news and feature articles, columns, editorials, and science, technology, and sports reporting. It also allows students to practice copyreading, headlining, cartooning, TV broadcasting (Pulse 360), radio broadcasting, and collaborative desktop publishing. Notably, the radio broadcasting team has remained the three-time champion of DSPC La Union from 2024 to 2026.

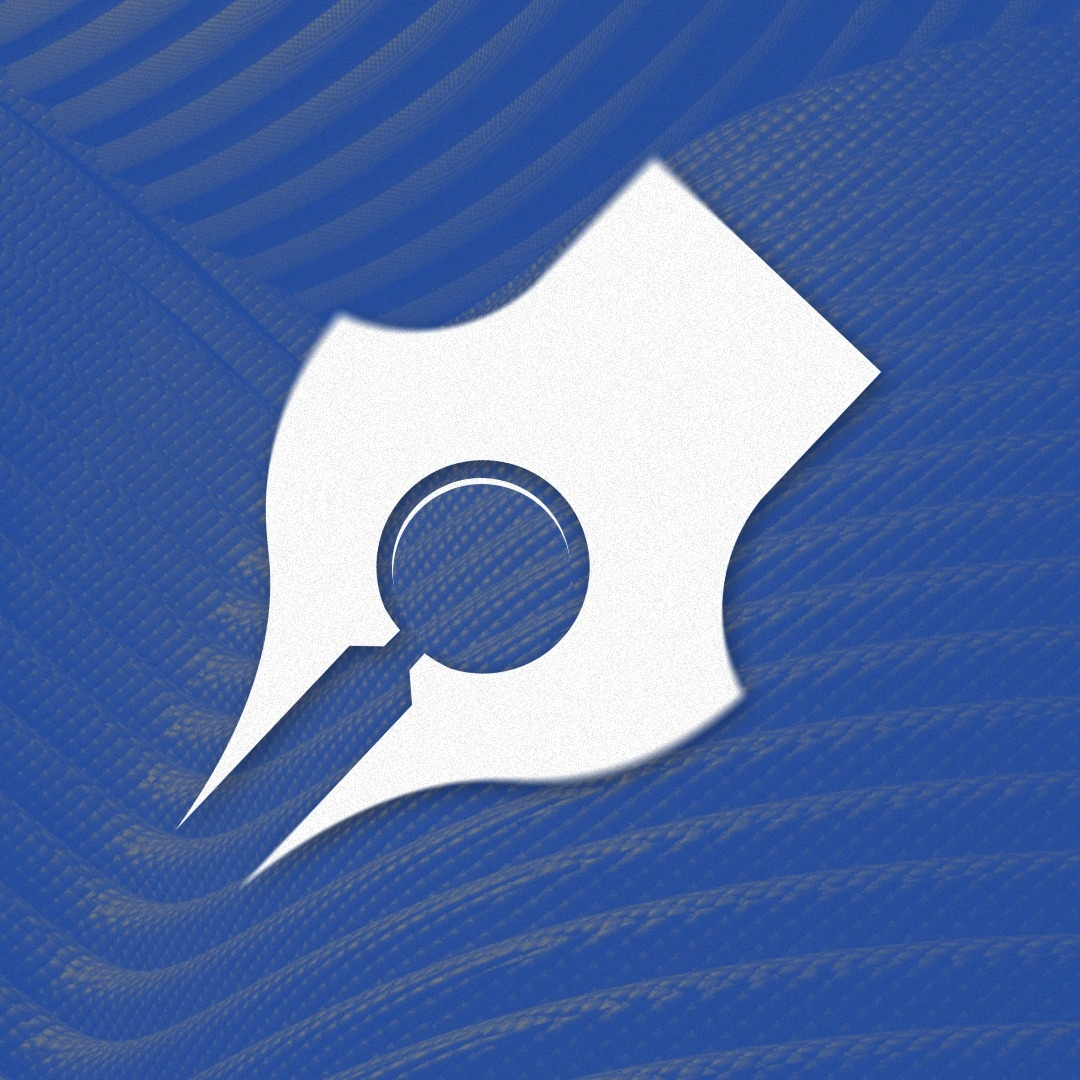

Ang Tagatuklas, ang opisyal na publikasyon sa Filipino - nagbibigay ito sa mga estudyante ng pagkakataon na hasain ang kanilang kasanayan sa pagsusulat ng balita, lathalain, kolum, editoryal, ulat sa agham at teknolohiya, at palakasan. Pinahihintulutan din nito ang mga estudyante na magsanay sa pagwawasto o copyreading, paggawa ng headline, cartooning, radio broadcasting, online publishing, at collaborative desktop publishing.

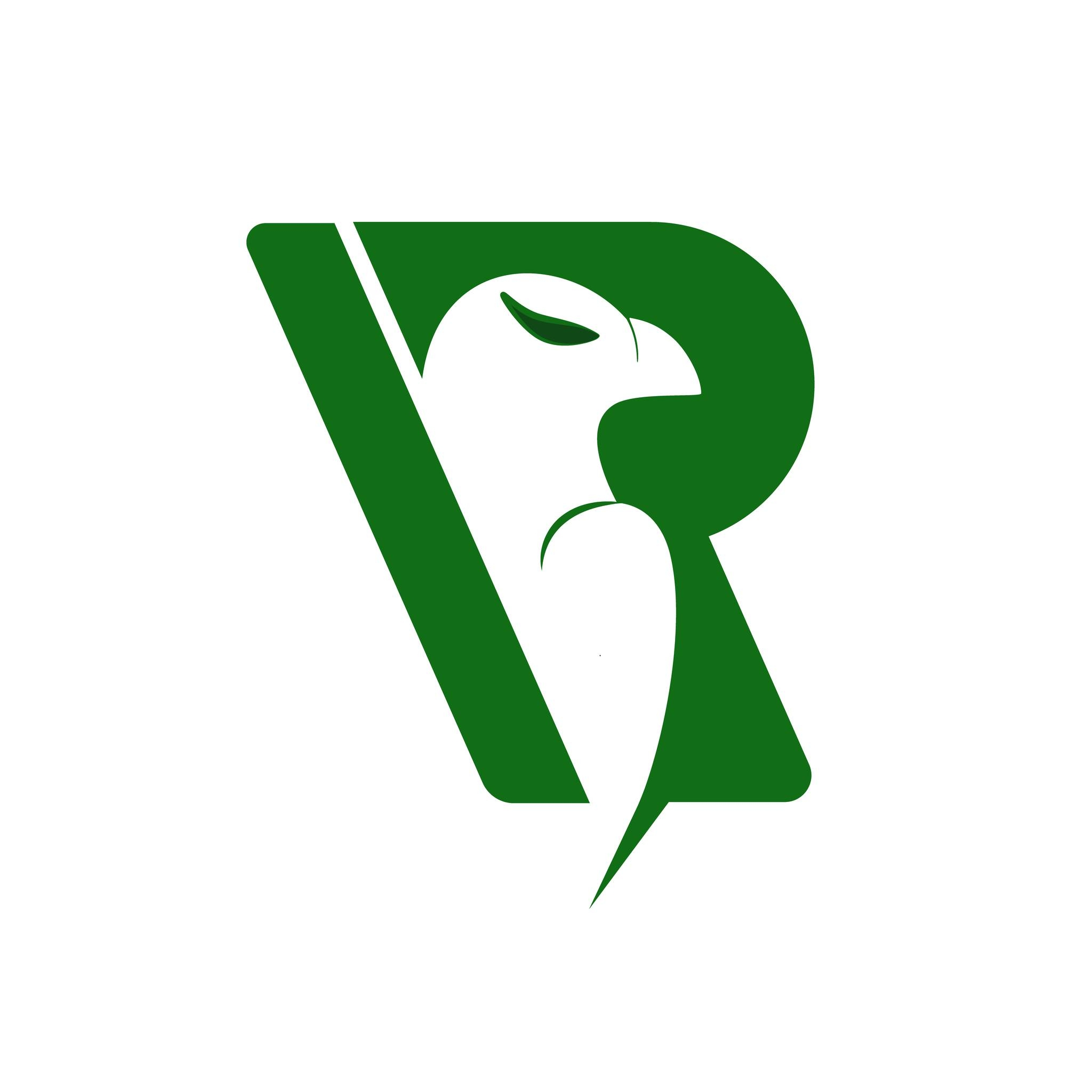
REGSEYE SSLG

=== Supreme Secondary Learner Government (RegsEye SSLG) ===
- The main student government of the school, which students can join by forming or running as partylists at the end of the school year. Its tagline is “We care, we lead, we serve the SSLG way”, coined as RegsEye to emphasize the essence of an eagle.

=== Youth for Environment in Schools Organization (Regsay Uno Siyensikat) ===
- An organization that facilitates environmental, science, and research-related activities, including environmental awareness programs, STEMAZING research seminars, and the celebration of National Science Month.

=== Media and Technical Team ===
- A group of students responsible for managing the school’s technical systems during events, including sound management, editing, videography, and photography.

=== Regsay Sindaw ===
- A student dance group divided into traditional and creative dancers, participating in school and community events such as the annual fiesta of Bangar, La Union, for the Cultural Revival Night.

=== SC1ON Sports Club ===
- A sports organization composed of student-athletes that promotes sportsmanship, organizes athletic events, and encourages participation in various sports competitions.

=== Red Cross Youth Council ===
- Responsible for handling emergencies, assisting the school clinic, and supporting disaster preparedness activities such as earthquake simulations and first-aid initiatives.

=== Regsay Youth Ministry ===
- A Catholic student club composed of students who actively participate in church-related activities, including serving as a choir during Masses such as Foundation Day, the Baccalaureate Mass, and other school–church events.

== Facilities and resources ==
The RSHS for Region 1 campus contains three buildings: the old academic building, a laboratory building, and the administrative building. The academic building houses all the lecture classes of the students and ICT laboratory. The laboratory building houses science laboratories. The Administrative building houses the Office of the Principal, Faculty Office, and School Library.

Located beside the Administrative building, the laboratory building houses the four laboratories: the General Science Laboratory, the Biology Laboratory, the Chemistry Laboratory and the Physics Laboratory.

The RSHS Library supports the students by providing resources ranging from traditional print and microform to electronic subscription e-journals and databases. Located on the administrative building, the library is composed of the General Library, which stores encyclopedias; the Natural Science Section which covers sciences, mathematics and ICT; the Human Sciences Library which covers history, languages and literature, and other fields of social sciences; and the Multi-media and Internet Library.

The school has also one covered court where sports activities and other productions are held. Construction of the facility began in 2001 as part of the project of the 5th batch of SCIons (class 2002).

Recent expansions include a two-storey Grade 7 building, with a PTA dhaving ing, an air-conditioned School Clinic, and a school museum called GASERA. A four-storey Senior High School Building now accommodates Medical and Engineering (STEM)-focused senior high programs. This building also contains a computer, a new library, and the Senior High School Faculty Offices. The latest building, completed in 2025, includes new classrooms, an unpublished research room housing student research collected over the years, and new senior high school categories.

== Milestones (1994-2005) ==
Date	Event
1994	The eleven Regional Science High Schools were established nationwide by virtue of DECS Order No. 69, s.1993.
1998	RSHS-I moved to its own home at Ma. Cristina East, Bangar, La Union
1998	RSHS joined an international competition for Investigatory Projects. Alvin Jay Mostoles, then a third year student, represented the Philippines for its invention "Stone Segregator", in SEAMEO Science Fair, held in RECSAM Penang Malaysia.
2000	RSHS-I joined the National Secondary Achievement Test (NSAT). It ranked 43rd among top performing secondary schools in the Philippines.
2000	RSHS-I had an internet connection, the first public secondary school in La Union to do so.
2001	For the second time to join NSAT, RSHS ranked number 29 all over Philippines
2002	Mr. Rogelio C. Valdez, a Science Project adviser, was nominated as the best Science Project adviser in the 53rd Intel International Science and Engineering Fair, Kentucky, USA.
2002	RSHS held its Graduation exercises on its own campus for the first time.
2004	A group of RSHS students represented the Philippines in the Future Creation Fair, JIII, held in Tokyo, Japan.
2004	The first National Achievement Test was held. RSHS-I ranked number 10 nationwide.
2005	RSHS-I ranked number 2 nationwide in the National Achievement Test

== Alumni ==
RSHS-1 alumni are called "SCIons" from the word "Scio" (Latin) word which means science, knowledge and to know; "ions" which implies their importance to society; and the word itself "scion" which denotes descendant of Galileo Galilei, the Father of Modern Science.

Roughly one percent (1%) of alumni is in the sciences, engineering, and mathematics. The rest are in the humanities, journalism, law, business administration, accountancy, medicine, public administration, and the military.
