= Eastern Visayas Regional Science High School =

Public high school in Samar, Philippines

- Mataas na Paaralan ng Agham Panrehiyon ng Silangang Visayas (Filipino)

Location
- Catbalogan, Samar; Philippines; 11°46′23″N 124°53′04″E

Information
- Type: Science High School
- Motto: Scientia Et Virtus ("Knowledge And Virtue")
- Established: 1994
- Principal: Rolex Jacosalem, School Head II
- Enrollment: Approximately 200 (all levels)
- Language: English, Filipino
- Campus: San Roque, Catbalogan, Samar
- Colors: Blue and white
- Nickname: EVRSHS, EVSci, RegSci
- Affiliations: Department of Education - Division of Samar; Regional Science High School Union

Eastern Visayas Regional Science High School (Filipino: Mataas na Paaralan ng Agham Panrehiyon ng Silangang Visayas) is one of the campuses of the Regional Science High School Union under the supervision of the Bureau of Secondary Education of the Department of Education. It is located at San Roque, Catbalogan, Samar along the Arteche Boulevard.

== Admission ==
Students who belong to upper 10% of the Grade 6 graduating class, recommended by their respective principals are qualified to take the entrance exam.

To acquire an entrance examination form, examinees should have:

- A final grade of 85% in English, Science and Mathematics
- A final grade of 83% in all other learning areas, and
- A weighted average of at least 85%.

Students should maintain a grade of 85 for major subjects and 83 in minor subjects. If a student fails to meet this requirement, they would be put under probation for the following year. If the student still fails to meet the requirements, they will be due to disqualification, hence, they are advised to transfer to another school by the end of the school year. They are then not allowed anymore to enroll once eliminated.

=== Curriculum ===
The school is following the new curriculum by the Department of Education, the Enhanced K to 12 Curriculum, as of the school year 2012-2013 and Curricula of English, Science and Mathematics shall be enriched by additional subjects and electives prescribed in DepEd Order no. 49, s. 2003. The school offers Senior High School with STEM (Science and Technology, Engineering and Mathematics) as the academic track since Science and Mathematics are the core subjects in the school.
