= Mimaropa Regional Science High School =

Public high school in Oriental Mindoro, Philippines

- Mataas na Paaralan ng Agham Panrehiyon ng Mimaropa (Filipino)
- Regional Science High School for Mimaropa

Location
- Bansud, Oriental Mindoro; Philippines
- Coordinates: 12°52′10″N 121°27′15″E

Information
- Former names: Bansud National High School
- Type: Science High School
- Motto: Scientia et Virtus ("Knowledge And Virtue")
- Established: 2005
- Enrollment: approx 100-300 (all levels)
- Language: English, Filipino
- Campus: Pag-asa, Bansud, Oriental Mindoro
- Colors: Moss green and cream
- Nickname: BNHS-MRSHS
- Affiliations: Department of Education - Division of Oriental Mindoro; Regional Science High School Union

Mimaropa Regional Science High School (Filipino: Mataas na Paaralang ng Agham Panrehiyon ng Mimaropa - Bansud National High School), is a public science high school supervised by the Department of Education. It is the Regional Science High School for Mimaropa: Southern Tagalog Islands or collectively known as Mimaropa. It is located in Pag-asa, Bansud, Oriental Mindoro, Philippines with a land area of 30,000 square meters.

The school was chosen by the Department of Education through Department Order No. 60 in collaboration with the Bureau of Secondary Education (BSE) to become a Regional Science High School after it has complied with all of the requirements needed.

Established in 2011, the campus is newest member of the Regional Science High School Union of the Philippines.

== Admission ==
Students who belong to upper 10% of the Grade 6 graduating class, recommended by their respective principals are qualified to take the entrance exam.

To acquire an entrance examination form, examinees should have:

- A final grade of 85% in English, Science and Mathematics
- A final grade of 83% in all other learning areas, and
- A weighted average of at least 85%.

Students should maintain a grade of 85 for major subjects and 83 in minor subjects. If a student fails to meet this requirement, they would be put under probation for the following year. If the student still fails to meet the requirements, they will be due to disqualification, hence, they are to transfer to another school by the end of the school year.
