= Dumaguete Science High School =

Public high school in Negros Oriental, Philippines

- Mataas na Paaralan ng Agham ng Dumaguete (Filipino)
- Regionalium Scientia Alta Schola

Location
- Dumaguete City, Negros Oriental; Republic of The Philippines; 9°19′21″N 123°17′41″E

Information
- Former names: Ramon Teves Pastor Memorial-DSHS
- Type: Regional Science High School
- Motto: Scientia Et Vita (Science and Life (or Knowledge and Life))
- Established: 1988
- Principal: Dr. Roxan C. Dayao
- Grades: 7 to 12
- Language: English, Filipino, Korean
- Campus: Dumaguete, Negros Oriental
- Colors: Pink and white
- Nickname: DuSci, DumaSci, RegSci, SciHigh, Science High
- Affiliations: DepEd Dumaguete; Regional Science High School Union

Ramon Teves Pastor Memorial - Dumaguete Science High School (RTPM-DSHS) is a public science high school in Dumaguete, Philippines. It is a DepEd-recognized science high school and serves as the Regional Science High School for the Negros Island region.

== History ==
The school was founded and established in 1988 per Ordinance No. 81, Resolution No. 6 dated August 10, 1988, upon the recommendation of the Board of Directors of the Dumaguete Science Foundation, Inc. which is the resourcing arm of the school to maintain and sustain its operation.

RTPM - Dumaguete Science High School, started as a single-level and single-class high school temporarily occupying an area within the campus of the Dumaguete City National High School in Calindagan. It moved to its permanent school site in Villa Amada Subdivision of Barangay Daro on land donated by Ramon Teves-Pastor, in 1991 and has since grown from a single classroom within other city schools to a complete high school of more than 40 students.

On July 21, 1993, the RTPM – Dumaguete Science High School was integrated into the national roll by virtue of DECS Order No. 69, s. 1993 as among the thirteen Regional Science High Schools throughout the country (now composed of sixteen regions). It is one of the top high schools in the region.

The school also served as Regional Science High School for the short-lived Negros Island Region (Region XVIII) under the new setup of the national government to establish DepEd Regional Office in Dumaguete. However, the region only existed from May 29, 2015, through Executive Order No. 183 signed by President Benigno Aquino III and later abolished by President Rodrigo Duterte on August 9, 2017, through signed Executive Order No. 38 to revoke EO No. 183. DepEd Regional Office for Negros Island Region in Dumaguete became what is now the DepEd Sub-Regional Office of Region VII when the province of Negros Oriental returned to Central Visayas and the school once again served as RSHS for its original region.

In 2016, the school was extended to include a senior high school teaching up to grade 12.

== Facilities ==
=== Socorro Building ===
The newest building of RTPM-DSHS is primarily used as a science laboratory and now is also used for second-year classes. It was constructed on March 23, 2009, and completed on August 23, 2009. The Socorro Building hosts the school's Biology and Chemistry Laboratories at the ground floor and a function hall on its second floor.

=== Information and Communications Technology (ICT) Laboratories ===
RTPM - Dumaguete Science High School is equipped with two dedicated Information and Communications Technology (ICT) Laboratories, situated on the second floor directly above the school library. These laboratories are strategically split to cater to the specific needs of different academic levels: one lab is designated for Junior High School (JHS) students (located on the left side from the main entrance), while the other serves Senior High School (SHS) students (located on the right side). This arrangement ensures specialized access and resources for both academic stages.

== Student affairs ==
=== Student levels ===
Ramon Teves Pastor Memorial - Dumaguete Science High School consists of six year levels namely Discoverers, Seekers, Explorers, Analysts, Probers, and Researchers. As of 2026, the batch "Analysts" has been retired. The students, including alumni, are called DuScians.

=== Supreme Secondary Learner Government (SSLG) ===
The student body of RTPM - Dumaguete Science High School is represented by the Supreme Secondary Learner Government (SSLG). The SSLG is composed of a set of elected student officers who lead and serve the student population. These positions typically include the President, Vice President, Secretary, Treasurer, Auditor, Protocol Officer (PO), and Public Information Officer (PIO). Additionally, each year level, from Grade 7 to Grade 12, is represented by an elected representative, ensuring a voice for all students in the school's governance.

=== Clubs and organizations ===
RTPM - Dumaguete Science High School has a range of clubs and organizations. Some clubs also require students to audition for membership.

Notable examples of organizations include the Youth for the Environment in Schools Organization (YES-O), which promotes environmental awareness and action among students. Among the various clubs, Ang Lipon ng mga Aktibong Kabataan sa Asignaturang Araling Panlipunan (ALAPAAP) stands out as a prominent example, focusing on activities related to social sciences.

All clubs and organizations operate under the oversight of the Learner Activities Commission. This commission is led by the Learner Activities Chair (LAC), who is responsible for reviewing club registries, approving activities, and conducting post-activity assessments. The LAC ultimately reports to the Supreme Secondary Learner Government (SSLG), ensuring student-led oversight and coordination of all co-curricular initiatives.
