= Regional Science High School Union =

Regional Science High School
- Philippines

Information
- Type: Science high school network
- Motto: Latin: Scientia Et Virtus Filipino: Kaalaman at Kabutihan (Knowledge and Virtue)
- Established: 1994; 32 years ago
- Enrollment: RSHS 1- 295; RSHS 2- 343; RSHS 3- 483; RSHS 4a- 494; RSHS 4b- n/a RSHS 5- 270; RSHS 6- 726; RSHS 7- 488; RSHS 8- 126; RSHS 9- n/a RSHS 10- 432; RSHS 11- n/a RSHS 12- 245; CARAGA RSHS - 400; CAR RSHS- 272; ARMM RSHS- n/a NCR RSHS- 1045; TOTAL 5178+x
- Campus: 17 (one per region)
- Ranking: 1 (1999)- RSHS NCR 47 (1999) - RSHS Region 1; 1 (2000)- RSHS Region 3; 27(2000) RSHS Region 1; 10 (2004)-RSHS Region 1; 1 (2005)- RSHS CARAGA; 2 (2005)- RSHS Region 1; 5 (2006)- RSHS CARAGA

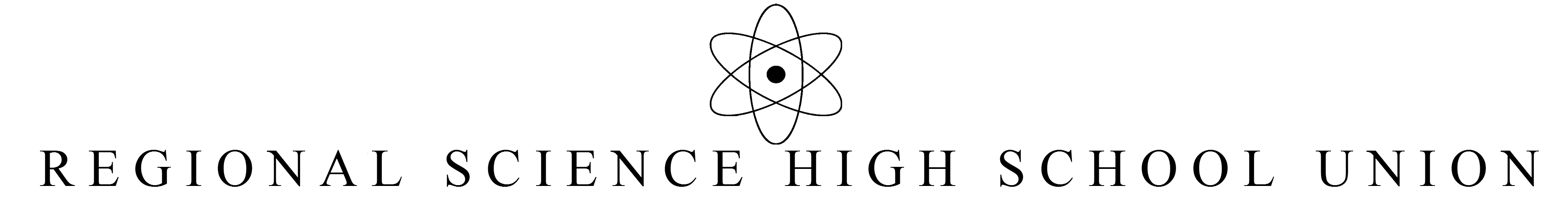
Logo of the RSHS

The Regional Science High School Union (RSHS-Union) is a specialized system of public secondary schools in the Philippines, established during the academic year 1994–1995. It is operated and supervised by the Department of Education, with a curriculum heavily focused on math and science. It remains within the ambit of the Department of Education, unlike the specialized science high school system of national scope, the Philippine Science High School (an attached agency of the Department of Science and Technology).

== History ==
Timeline
Date	Event
1994	The eleven Regional Science High Schools were established nationwide by virtue of DECS Order No. 69, s.1993.
1996	CARAGA Regional Science High School was established in Surigao City by DepEd Order No. 29, s. 1996.
1997	Quesci became the Regional Science High School, by DECS Order No. 58 Series 99 and Republic Act 8496.
1999	Science Development National High School (SDNHS), was converted to RSHS for NCR and Western Visayas, respectively by virtue of DECS Order No. 58, series 1999 in consonance with R.A. 8496 (An Act to Establish the Philippine Science High School System and Providing Funds Therefore).
1998	RSHS-I joined for the first time an international competition for Investigatory Projects. Alvin Jay Mostoles, then third year student, represented the Philippines for its invention "Stone Segregator", in SEOMEO Science Fair, held in RECSAM Penang Malaysia.
2000	RSHS-II topped the National Secondary Achievement Test
October 3, 2002	Gusa National High School (RSHS-annex), Gov. Leopoldo Lopez Memorial Science High School and Alabel National Science High School, was identified as RSHS for Regions X, XI and XII, respectively, pursuant to Dep. Ed order no. 48 s. 2002.
November 3, 2004	Bansud National High School, in Oriental Mindoro, was conferred as RSHS for Region IV-B (MIMAROPA), by virtue of Dep. Ed. order no. 60 s. 2004, making it the 17th RSHS.
2004	a group of RSHS for Region I students represented the Philippines in the Future Creation Fair, JIII, held in Tokyo, Japan.
2004	The first National Achievement Test was held. RSHS-I and RSHS-XII ranked number 10 & 4, respectively, nationwide.
2004	The first RSHS Congress was held in NCR (Quezon City Science High School), with the theme: " RSHS: The Epitome of Excellence".
2007	The first RSHS Achievement Test was administered

== Campuses ==
Regional Science High School Union comprises 17 campuses nationwide. Some had been annexes of public secondary schools, while others had been established as specialized science high school prior to establishment of RSHS in 1994.

Below is a list of RSHS's and their mother school or former name.

- Regional Science High School for Region I
  (formerly annex of Doña Francisca Lacsamana de Ortega Memorial National High School - Special Science Class)
- Regional Science High School for Region II
  (formerly annex of Tumauini NHS- NSEC RSHS)
- Cordillera Regional Science High School
  (formerly Benguet Public High School)
- Regional Science High School for Region III
  (formerly annex of Olongapo City NHS-SSC)
- Regional Science High School for Region IV-A
  (formerly Cavite National Science High School - est. 1980)
- Regional Science High School for Region IV-B
  (formerly Bansud National High School)
- Regional Science High School for Region V
  (formerly Bicol Regional Science High School)
- Regional Science High School for Region VI
  (formerly Aklan Science Development NHS - est. 1980 / Science Development National High School)
- Regional Science High School for Region VIII
  (formerly Calbiga National High School / Samar National High School)
- Regional Science High School for Region IX
  (formerly Zamboanga City NHS Main- RSHS) annex
- Regional Science High School for Region X
  (formerly Gusa National High School)
- Regional Science High School for Region XI
  (Established through the R.A. No. 9630)
- Regional Science High School for Region XII
  (formerly Alabel National Science High School)
- Caraga Regional Science High School
  (formerly San Juan NHS- RSHS annex)
- ARMM Regional Science High School
  (formerly Parang National High School - Landasan Campus / Amir Bara Lidasan National High School)
- Regional Science High School for NCR
  (Quezon City Science High School - est. 1967)
- Regional Science High School for Negros Island Region
  (also known as Ramon Teves Pastor Memorial-Dumaguete Science High School)

== Logos ==
There is no unified logo for Regional Science High Schools. Each RSHS has its own logo.

== Admission and retention ==
=== Admission ===
Students who belong to the upper 10% of the Grade VI graduating class and who have been recommended by their respective principals are qualified to take the entrance examination.

Selection is done in three stages and is conducted by the school. The first stage is the administration of standardized mental ability and aptitude test. The student applicant must belong to the 40 percent of the first stage of examination in order to advance to the second stage.

The second stage is the proficiency test in Science, English, and Mathematics. The stage qualifier should obtain at least 75 percent proficiency level in order to advance to the last stage of the selection process.

The last stage is the interview of the student and parents conducted by the RSHS screening committee. The interview is scored.

=== Retention ===
A student should obtain a final average grade of at least 85% in all subjects, in any grading period. If a student fails to meet the latter grade requirement the student will be in probation for a period of one year.

There were plans to increase the cut-off grade in Science, Math, and English subjects from 85% to 88% and the rest of the subjects from 83% to 85% but this was not implemented.

==== Transfer ====
Only students who have maintained the grade requirement set for RSHS are allowed to transfer laterally, that is, from one RSHS to another. Transfer from general high school to the RSHS is not allowed in any curriculum year.

== Curriculum ==
=== Overview ===
Regional Science High Schools implement a curriculum which is different from Regular High Schools (which uses RBEC curriculum) and Science High Schools other than RSHS (which uses ESEP curriculum) in the Philippines and Philippine Science High School (which implements curriculum prescribed by DOST).

The curriculum consists of four levels, which is two years of general studies, followed by two years of a student-chosen major. Students apply for majors in sophomore year, and take four semesters of major classes throughout junior and senior year.

The schools offer an accelerated curriculum for math, science and information and communications technology and a custom-made curriculum tailored for the school in the areas of the English and Filipino language, social studies, and humanities, with required courses and a wide selection of electives. Students have an opportunity to do independent research, and many compete in the annual Intel Science Fair.

The basic science courses includes earth & environmental sciences, biology, chemistry, and physics. First year students tackles earth & environmental science, and Introduction to Physical Sciences (Physics & Chemistry). Biology, chemistry and physics is introduced during second year. Sophomores tackles the areas of botany, inorganic chemistry, and mechanics. Zoology, organic chemistry, and thermodynamics is being studied by juniors. Seniors have human biology, analytical chemistry and electricity, electronics, electromagnetics, and vectors.

In mathematics, students take up elementary mathematics, elementary and intermediate algebra, plane and solid geometry, and probability and statistics during freshman. Linear algebra, analytic geometry, plane and spherical trigonometry, and statistics in research were taken during sophomore. Differential and integral calculus and differential equations, and Advanced Statistics are learned by juniors. Seniors tackles advanced topics in mathematics.

Students takes a four-year English course. Grammar and composition is tackled by freshmen and sophomores, while journalism, and speech and drama are included in the junior and senior course respectively. Technical writing is also included in the freshmen English course. Philippine literature, Asian literature, world Literature, and contemporary literature are taught during freshman, sophomore, junior, and senior years, respectively.

Information and communications technology (ICT) is also a part of the curriculum. Freshmen, learn about computer fundamentals, digital design, and programming. Sophomores undergo a computer programming and applications course. Digital signal processing is learned by juniors. Data communication and networking is a part of the senior year.

Four years of Filipino language and literatures are required. Sining ng Pakikipagtalastasan (communication arts) courses are studied by freshman and sophomores. Juniors tackle pagbasa at pagsulat sa iba't ibang disciplina (reading and writing in different disciplines) while seniors learn about retorika (rhetoric). Included in their panatikan (literature) course are Ibong Adarna, Florante at Laura, Noli Me Tangere, and El Filibusterismo, which are tackled during freshman, sophomore, junior, and senior years, respectively.

Social studies and history classes are required. Philippine history, Asian history, world history, and the Life of Jose Rizal are taken up by freshmen, sophomores, juniors and seniors, respectively. Sociology, geography, economics, and political science are learned during freshman, sophomore, junior and senior, respectively.

Health and Physical Education courses are also required, with many activities to choose from.

Previously Values education was taught in RSHSs in freshman and sophomore levels, however the subject was removed from the RSHSs curricula in 2003. The subject was replaced by Technical Writing and Introduction to Statistics in freshman curricula and Statistics in Research in sophomore curricula.

=== Amendments ===
In reference to Dep. Ed order No. 25 S. 2006, the following are amendments to enclosure no. 1 of Dep. Ed order no. 49 s. 2003 entitled " The 2003 Curriculum of Regional Science High Schools"

a. Mathematics Curricular offerings effective school year 2006–2007

- Mathematics III(elective)- Analytic Geometry
- Mathematics IV(core)- Calculus
- Mathematics IV(elective)-Analytic Geometry

b. Mathematics Curricular offerings effective school year 2007–2008

- Mathematics III(elective)- Analytic Geometry
- Mathematics IV(core)-Calculus
- Mathematics IV(elective)- Linear Algebra

c. Differential Equation and Geology/Meteorology/Astronomy as electives in fourth year shall not be offered as electives for high school students.

== Subsidy ==
Each of the 17 Regional Science High Schools are given by the government an allocation for Maintenance and Other Operating Expenses (MOOE) separate from other public high schools in the Philippines. The annual subsidy of RSHSs is divided as follows: 10% for the procurement of supplies and materials for mathematics, science and English, 15% procurement of instructional materials including textbooks for Science, Mathematics, English, and other subject areas, professional books, video materials and software in science, mathematics and English including internet subscription, 20% for procurement of science and mathematics equipment including the maintenance and repair of previously owned equipment and upgrading computers and printers, 12.5% will go for payment of electric and water bills, 25% for expenses for training/professional upgrading of all teachers, principals/OICs directly managing RSHSs, including attendance in seminars that may be sponsored by DepEd or other agencies; expenses for students participation in science and mathematics related activities, 12.5% for student researches and projects, and 5% for extra essential services such as security services.

== Stipend ==
Students of RSHS receive a monthly stipend from the local government of its respective region. This monthly stipend is intended to support the academic expenses of the students such as research projects.

Stipend of students vary per campus, although Regional Science High Schools 3, 4-A 6, 9, 10, and the NCR RSHS do not give stipend to their students.

== RSHS Achievement Test ==
Pursuant to DepEd memorandum 23 series 2007, the RSHS Achievement Test is administered by the Curriculum Development Division of Bureau of Secondary Education and Department of Education. The test administered consists of Calculus, Chemistry, Research, and Analytic Geometry. Being the youngest RSHS and only on its second year of operation, Bansud NHS-RSHS annex MIMAROPA administered the achievement test to its second year students. The test subjects administered in BNHS-RSHS annex MIMAROPA were, Geometry, Technical Writing, Botany and Business Mathematics.

== RSHS Congress ==
RSHS Congress is an annual meeting of RSHSs which started in 2004.

On January 23–28, 2004 the 16 RSHSs conducted the first RSHS Congress at RSHS for NCR (Quezon City Science High School), with the theme: " RSHS: The Epitome of Excellence".

The Congress aimed to provide effective medium for the promotion of science culture among RSHS students, formulate strategies to sustain quality delivery of science and mathematics education, encourage research and development and create pockets of excellence among RSHSs.

The 2006 second RSHS Congress was hosted and held at CARAGA Regional Science High School. The Congress theme was "Making Giant Strides in the Delivery of Science Education".

The 2007 third RSHS Congress was held at RELC, Catabangan, Zamboanga City and hosted by RSHS Zamboanga Peninsula. The theme of the congress was "Promotion of Strong Science Culture".

The 2008 fourth RSHS Congress was held at the Regional Science High School for Region III at SBMA, Olongapo, Zambales.
