= ARMM Regional Science High School =

Public high school in Maguindanao del Norte, Philippines

ARMM Regional Science High School (Note: Despite being superseded by Bangsamoro in 2019, the school continues to bear "ARMM" for "Autonomous Region in Muslim Mindanao" in its name.) Mataas na Paaralan ng Agham Panrehiyon ng ARMM Regionalium Scientia Alta Schola

Location
- Parang, Maguindanao del Norte; Philippines
- Coordinates: 7°20′14″N 124°14′58″E

Information
- Former names: Parang National High School-Landasan Campus; Amir Bara Lidasan National High School
- Type: Science High School
- Motto: Scientia Et Virtus ("Knowledge And Virtue")
- Established: 1996
- Principal: Bernardo D. Libetario
- Language: English, Filipino
- Campus: Sarmiento, Parang, Maguindanao del Norte
- Colors: Blue and yellow
- Nickname: ARMM RSHS, RegSci,
- Affiliations: Department of Education - Division of Maguindanao del Norte; Regional Science High School Union

ARMM Regional Science High School (Filipino: Mataas na Paaralan ng Agham Panrehiyon ng ARMM) is the Regional Science High School for the Bangsamoro Autonomous Region in Muslim Mindanao. It is a public science high school supervised by the Department of Education. The school is the former Parang National High School - Landasan Campus - Amir Bara Lidasan National High School. It became the Regional Science High School for Autonomous Region in Muslim Mindanao (ARMM) in 1996. It is located in Landasan, Parang, Maguindanao del Norte, Philippines.

In 2009, the five-classroom donated by Embassy of Japan was completed in support of peace and development initiatives in conflict-affected areas in Mindanao. Such initiative boosted the institution to become the center for excellence in science and in mathematics in the region.
