= Alabel =

Capital of Sarangani, Philippines

- Municipality
- Municipality of Alabel

Other transcription(s)
  - Jawi: ءلبيل
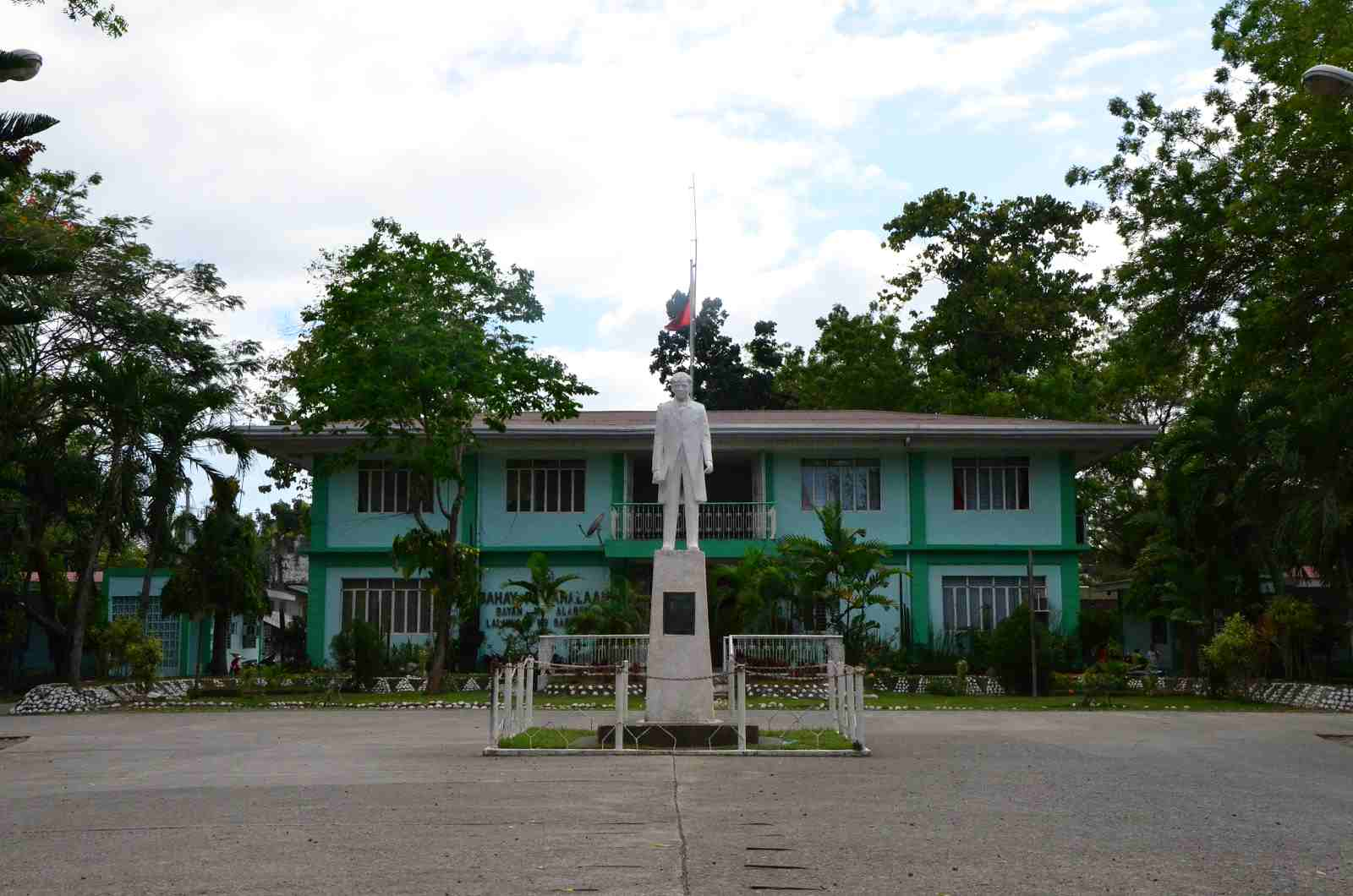
- Municipal Hall

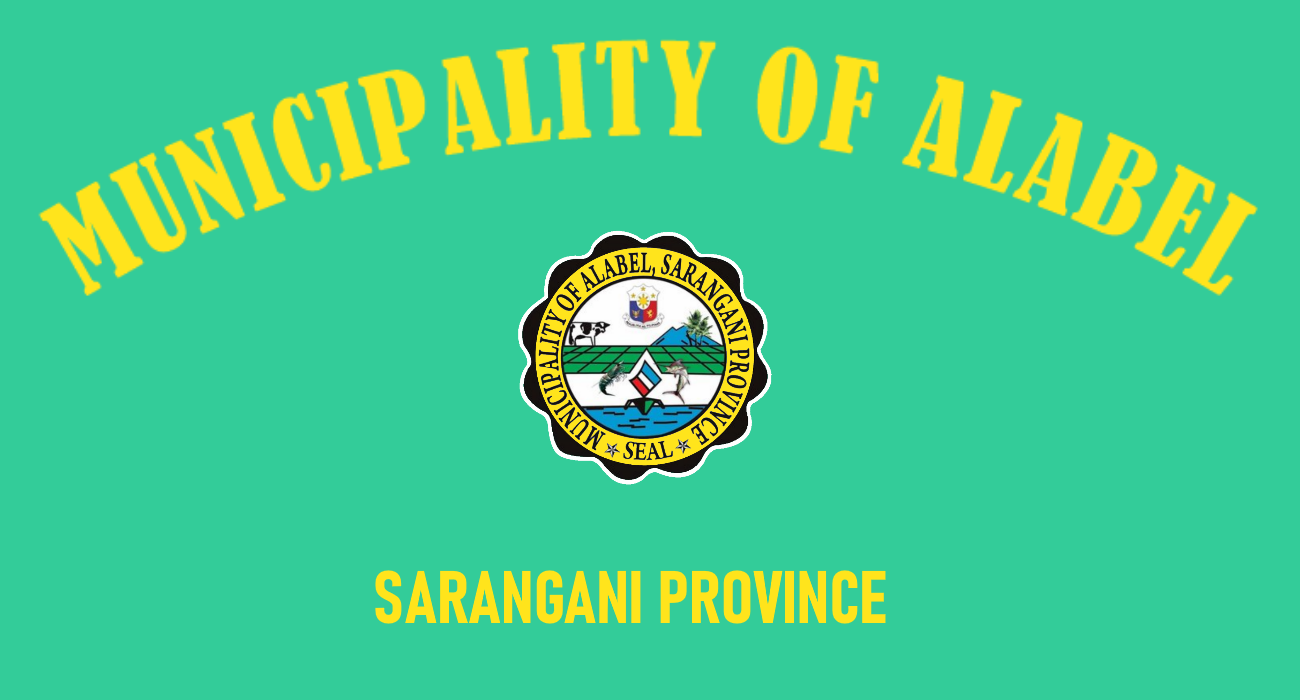
- Flag Seal
- Motto: Smile Alabel
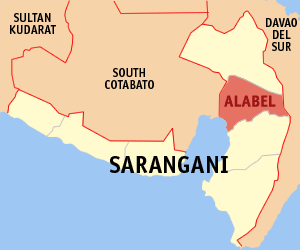
- Map of Sarangani with Alabel highlighted
- Interactive map of Alabel
- Location within the Philippines
- Coordinates: 6°06′08″N 125°17′13″E
- Country: Philippines
- Region: Soccsksargen
- Province: Sarangani
- District: Lone district
- Named for: Santiago Alaba & Tomas Beldad, Sr.
- Barangays: 13 (see Barangays)

Government
  - Type: Sangguniang Bayan
  - Mayor: Lilibeth Jabilles Salarda
  - Vice Mayor: Lente L. Salway Jr.
  - Representative: Steve Solon
  - Municipal Council: Members: Tungko P. Sadavao; Hermie C. Galzote; Jocelyn Q. Grafilo; Joel E. Aton; Paul S. Villamora; Ferdinand Rey O. Flores; Bonifacio M. Pacquiao; Danilo J. Jabilles
  - Electorate: 59,895 voters (2025)

Area
  - Total: 510.98 km^{2} (197.29 sq mi)
- Elevation: 74 m (243 ft)
- Highest elevation: 358 m (1,175 ft)
- Lowest elevation: 0 m (0 ft)

Population (2024 census)
  - Total: 90,120
  - Density: 176.4/km^{2} (456.8/sq mi)
  - Households: 20,956

Economy
  - Income class: 1st municipal income class
  - Poverty incidence: 22.68% (2023)
  - Revenue: ₱ 466 million (2024)
  - Assets: ₱ 1,078 million (2024)
  - Expenditure: ₱ 446.7 million (2024)
  - Liabilities: ₱ 557 million (2024)

Service provider
  - Electricity: South Cotabato 2 Electric Cooperative (SOCOTECO 2)
- Time zone: UTC+8 (PST)
- ZIP code: 9501
- PSGC: 1208001000
- IDD : area code: +63 (0)83
- Native languages: Cebuano; Tboli; Maguindanao; Blaan; Tagalog
- Festival: Kasadyaan Festival
- Website: www.alabel-sarangani.gov.ph

Alabel, officially the Municipality of Alabel (Note: Blaan: Banwé Alabél Sinugboanon: Lungsod sa Alabel Mëgindënëwn: Inged nu Alabil Tboli: Benwu Alabél Tagakolu: Lunsud na Alabél Hiligaynon: Banwa sang Alabel Ilokano: Ili ti Alabel Filipino: Munisipalidad ng Alabel), is a municipality and capital of the province of Sarangani, Philippines. According to the 2024 census, it has a population of 90,120 people.

== History ==
In 1947, the families of Santiago Alaba and Tomas Beldad Sr. settled in Buayan. The place became a barrio of the municipality of Dadiangas (now General Santos) on September 17, 1956, through Hadji Abdawa Mohamad and Marcos Malinao and named Alabel in honor of two families.

Alabel became a municipality under Republic Act 6393 (formerly House Bill No. 3222 sponsored by Rep. James Chiongbian) dated September 10, 1971, comprising eight barrios separated from the city: Alabel (now Poblacion), Alegria, Maribulan, Pag-asa, Kawas, Domolok, Bagacay and Tokawal. Barangays Spring, Baluntay, Datal Anggas, and Paraiso were created between 1986 and 1989, bringing the number to twelve.

=== Alaba Administration (1971–1986) ===
The first set of elected officials were; Lucio J. Alaba as Mayor, Jose Orlino, Jr. as Vice Mayor, and Councilors; Dionisio Lim, Gregorio Lumanta, Hermogenes Pecolados, Ignacio Solis, Alfredo Radaza, Honorio Navarro, Teodolito Jabilles, and Exequil Tecson.

=== Martial Law ===
The so-called battle of Ilaga (Ilonggo Land Grabbers Association, its acronym is spelled out of ilaga, meaning "rat" in Visayan languages) Muslim and Lumads happened in Alabel during Marcos administration in 1974. Many Lumads and Muslim were killed by Ilaga.

Civilian fled and evacuated in Dadiangas (now General Santos) in order to survive from brutalities in Alabel while some transfer and went home to their place of origin in Visayan Islands.

=== Sibugan Administration (1986–1998) ===
In 1986 EDSA Revolution, Mayor Alaba was replaced by Hernando L. Sibugan, the appointed mayor of the Ministry of Local Government and was elected to the same office in 1988 and 1992. Finally, Alabel was chosen the capital town of the newly created Sarangani Province by virtue of Republic Act No. 7228 on March 16, 1992, through the representation of James Chiongbian.

President Corazon Aquino landed in Barangay Spring in 1988 during her visit in South Cotabato. The President together with her team visited Mindanao to watch the solar eclipse. Astronomers and other tourists watched the said celestial phenomena.

President Corazon Aquino and Defense Secretary Fidel Ramos were among the estimated 20,000 sight-seers and scientists who jammed the cities of Davao and General Santos for the event, seen as a total eclipse only in the nation's extreme southern tip and parts of Indonesia. It was the first total eclipse seen in the Philippines since 1955. Another is not expected until the year 2042.

=== The Grafilos ===
Two Grafilos became local chief executives of Alabel for a span of 18 year from 1998 to 2016.

Narsico Ra. Grafilo Jr., served as mayor of Alabel from 1998 to 2007. His priority projects are road opening to far-flung barangays and the construction of phase 1 of Alabel MEGA PUBLIC MARKET. In his term, Kasadyaan Festival was inaugurated in 2001.

Corazon Sunga Grafilo succeeded Mayor Jun as mayor in 2007. In her term, her flagship program was the Garantisadong Serbisyo (GS) wherein the LGU bring all the local offices and the National Agancies closer to the people. Alabel became a sister city of Makati. She also completed the construction of the Alabel MEGA PUBLIC MARKET. Abante Alabel as a town's tagline was popularized in her term.

=== Creation of Ladol ===
Provincial Ordinance Nos. 2003-025 (dated December 1, 2003) and 2011-7-048 (July 26, 2011) of the Sarangani Provincial Board provided for the constitution of Sitio Ladol in Brgy. Poblacion into a regular barangay. This was ratified in a plebiscite held on August 18, 2012.

The separation was further formalized when Pres. Rodrigo Duterte signed Republic Act 11599 on December 10, 2021.

=== Salarda Administration (2016–present) ===
The administration of Vic Paul Salarda started in 2016. Infrastructure projects and community services were his administration's priority. Serbisyong Smile sa Barangay (SSB) was his flagship program where government agencies joined to bring services to various barangay in the municipality. Smile Alabel is the popular tagline of Mayor Nonoy.

=== Creation of New Canaan ===
Plebiscite for the creation of Barangay New Canaan
Choice	Votes	%
For	1,286	98.77
Against	16	1.23
Total	1,302	100.00
Registered voters/turnout	4,960	26.25%
Source: Posts from Alabel Information Office Facebook page and Boses ng Sambayanan Twitter Page

On August 20, 2022, majority of selected residents of Alabel ratified in a plebiscite Provincial Ordinance No. 2009-6-044, dated June 29, 2009, separating a part of Barangay Pag-asa to create a new one to be called New Canaan.

== Geography ==
Alabel is located at the head of Sarangani Bay in the southern part of Mindanao Island.

=== Barangays ===
Alabel is politically subdivided into 14 barangays, which are further subdivided into puroks and sitios.

- Alegria (Note: Cebuano: /ʔaˈlɛg.riˌja/)
- Bagacay (Note: Cebuano: /baˈga.kaj/)
- Baluntay (Note: Cebuano: /ba.lunˈtaj/)
- Datal Anggas (Note: Cebuano: /ˈda.tal ˌʔaŋ.gas/)
- Domolok (Note: Cebuano: /do.moˈlok/)
- Kawas (Note: Cebuano: /kaˈwas/)
- Ladol (Note: Cebuano: /ˈla.dol/)
- Maribulan (Note: Cebuano: /ma.ri.buˈlan/)
- New Canaan (Note: Cebuano: /ˈɲu ka.naˌʔan/)
- Pag-asa (Note: Cebuano: /paɡˈʔa.sa/)
- Paraiso (Note: Cebuano: /pa.raˈʔi.so/)
- Poblacion (Note: Cebuano: /pob.laˈʃon/)
- Spring (Note: Cebuano: /ʔɛsˈpriŋ/)
- Tokawal (Note: Cebuano: /to.kaˈwal/)

=== Climate ===
Climate data for Alabel, Sarangani
Month	Jan	Feb	Mar	Apr	May	Jun	Jul	Aug	Sep	Oct	Nov	Dec	Year
Mean daily maximum °C (°F)	31 (88)	31 (88)	31 (88)	31 (88)	30 (86)	29 (84)	29 (84)	29 (84)	30 (86)	30 (86)	30 (86)	30 (86)	30 (86)
Mean daily minimum °C (°F)	23 (73)	23 (73)	23 (73)	24 (75)	25 (77)	24 (75)	24 (75)	24 (75)	24 (75)	24 (75)	24 (75)	24 (75)	24 (75)
Average precipitation mm (inches)	129 (5.1)	106 (4.2)	148 (5.8)	180 (7.1)	261 (10.3)	316 (12.4)	295 (11.6)	274 (10.8)	220 (8.7)	238 (9.4)	243 (9.6)	181 (7.1)	2,591 (102.1)
Average rainy days	17.4	16.2	19.5	22.8	27.6	27.9	26.5	25.7	24.0	26.6	27.2	23.5	284.9
Source: Meteoblue

== Demographics ==
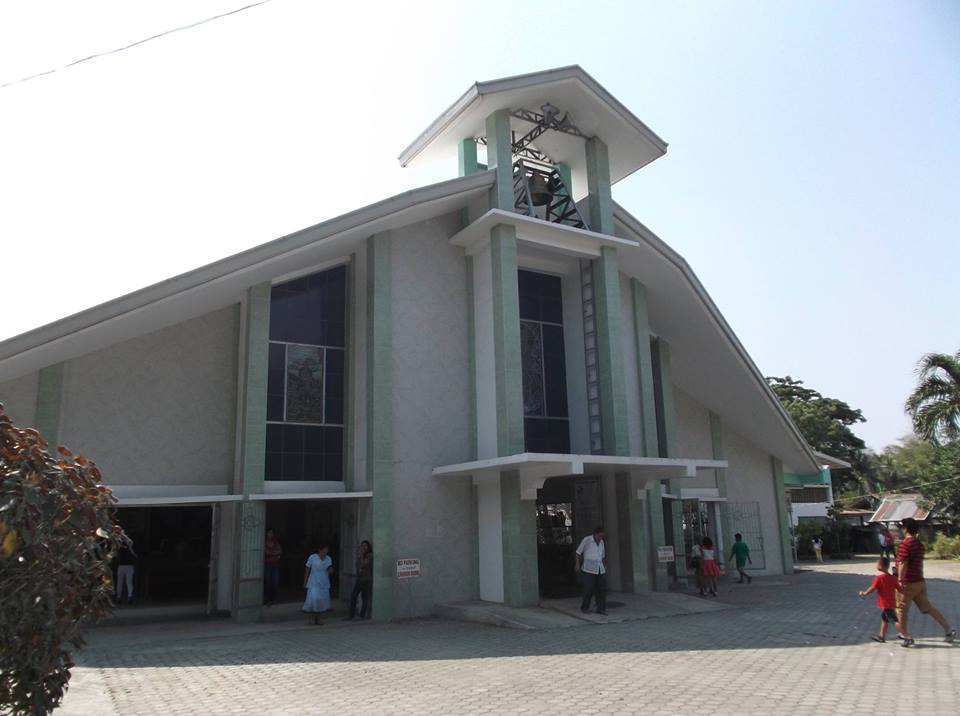
Parish Church in Alabel, Sarangani Province

Population census of Alabel
Year	Pop.	±% p.a.
1975	18,186	—
1980	25,620	+7.09%
1990	40,730	+4.75%
1995	46,527	+2.52%
2000	60,779	+5.90%
2007	71,872	+2.34%
2010	75,477	+1.80%
2015	80,359	+1.20%
2020	88,294	+2.00%
2024	90,120	+0.49%
Source: Philippine Statistics Authority

== Economy ==
Poverty incidence of Alabel (%)

Source: Philippine Statistics Authority

Alabel is largely based on agriculture with a high level production of dried coconut meat. Animal husbandry is the second biggest income earner, notably cattle farming. Other agricultural products are coconuts, maize, sugarcane, bananas, pineapples, cotton, mangoes; goat farming, pork, eggs, beef; fish; charcoal; coconut weaving. It is adjacent to the highly urbanized sea port city of General Santos.

The economy has accelerated in the past decade driven by advances in global communication technology and the finishing of a modern highway that tremendously improved trade and transport.

== Tourism ==
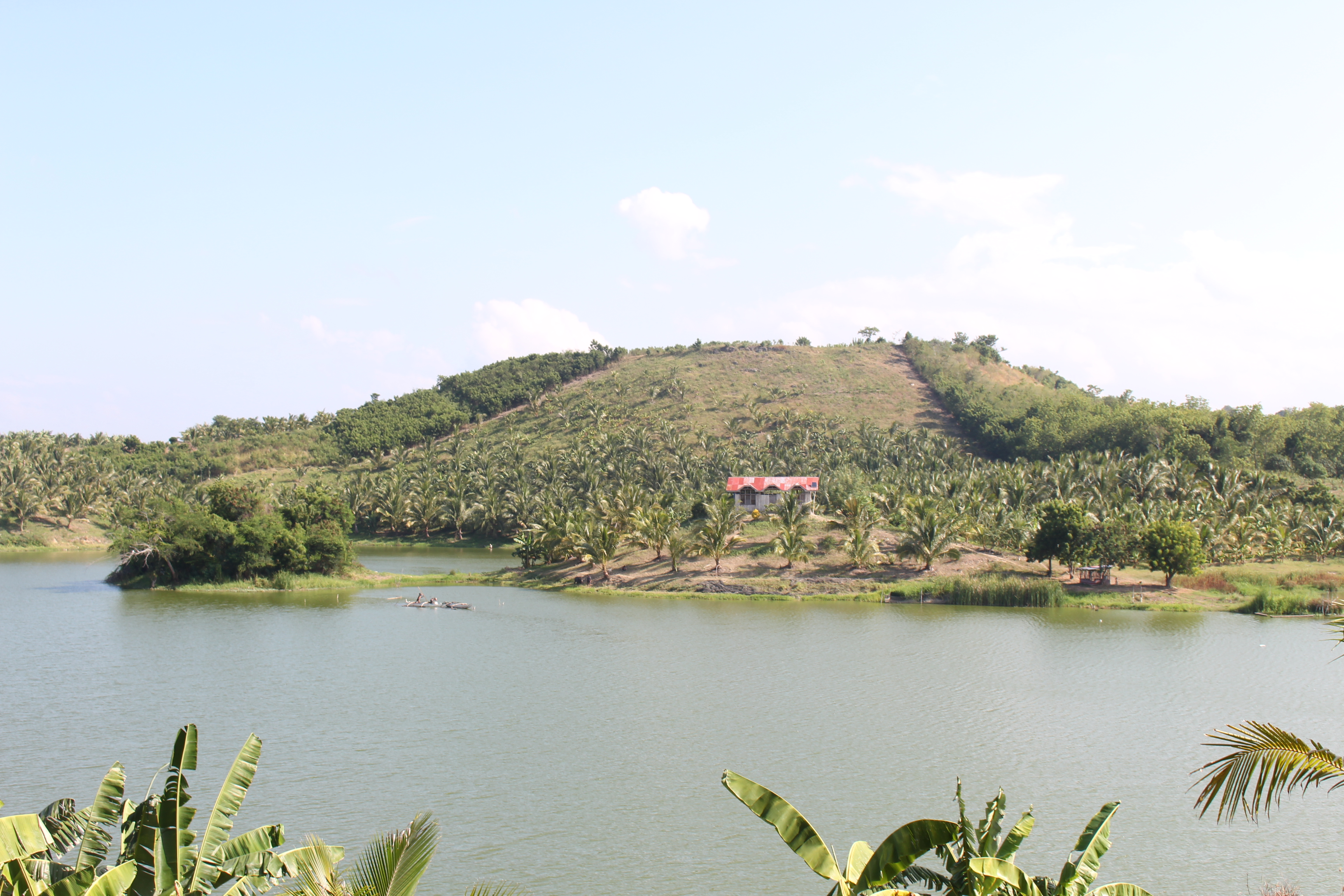
Lake Beto in Alabel, Sarangani Province

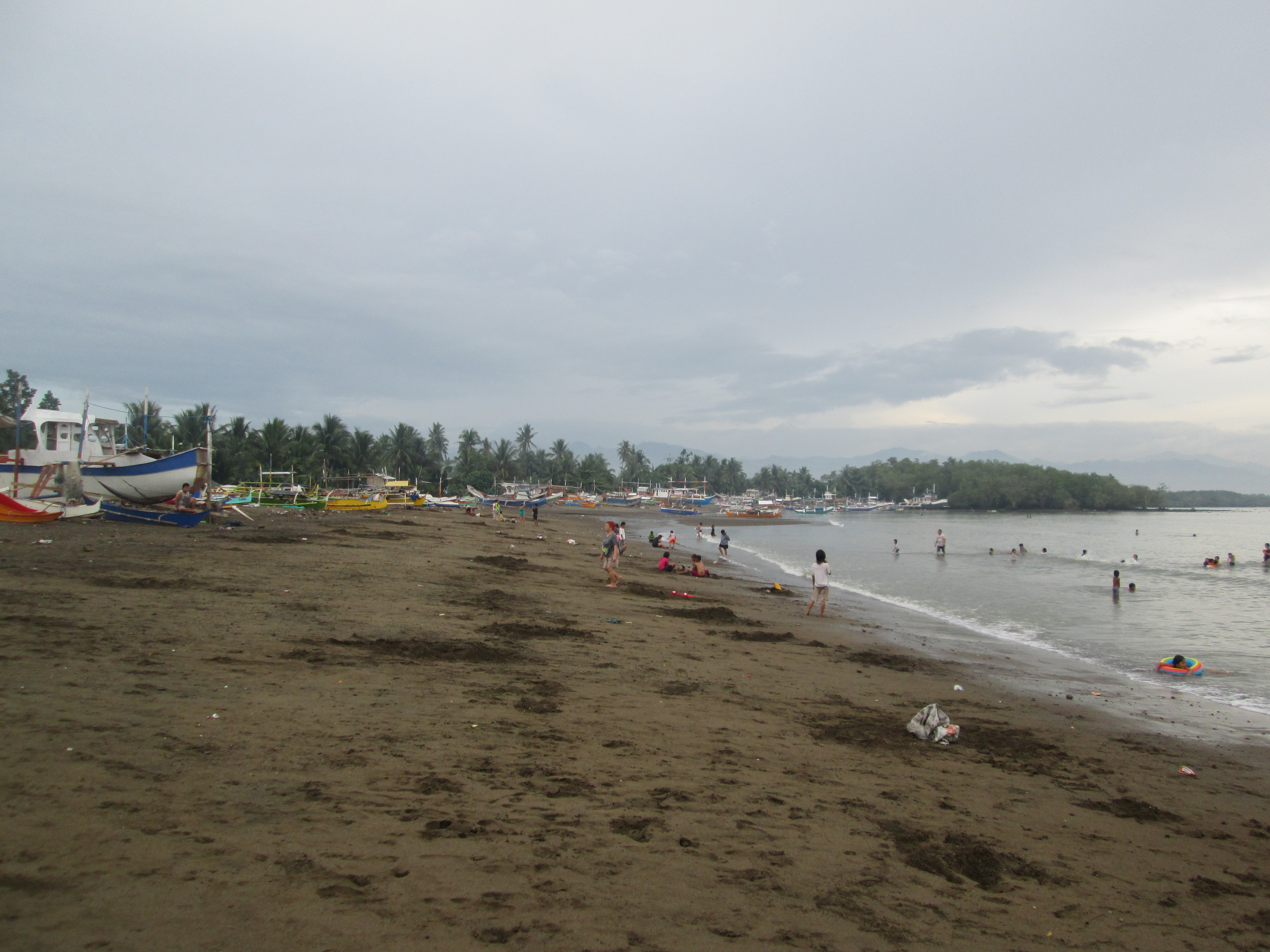
Barangay Ladol Beach

Alabel is known for its beaches and agricultural lands.

- Ladol Beach
- Half Moon (known as Kawas) Beach

== Culture ==
The Municipality of Alabel celebrates it Foundation anniversary every 10th day of September. It is an annual celebration to commemorate the founding of the town. Together the people of Alabel also celebrates the Kasadyaan Festival. Kasadyaan means bliss, to give an ideal representation of what is Alabel.

The annual Patronal Fiesta in Alabel is celebrated every May 15. It is feast day of San Isidro Labrador, the town's patron saint and the patron saint of farmers.

Barangay	Anniversary
Datal Anggas	April 9
Poblacion	September 15
Bagacay	June 8
Spring	June 9
Ladol	August 22
Maribulan	August 12
Pag-asa	August 10
Baluntay	September 25
Kawas	October 16
Paraiso	October 11
Alegria	November 25
Domolok	November 29
Tokawal	December 15
New Canaan, Pag-asa	August 20

Mutya ng Alabel is the annual beauty and brains pageant held in Alabel.

== Infrastructure ==
The construction of new municipal hall building was initialized in 2016. Municipal Civic Gymnasium facade was also renovated.

=== Transportation ===
It takes 30 minutes land travel by a PUV or tricycle from General Santos to Alabel. ALTRAMSCO is the accredited transport union in Alabel.

Various roads and bridges in different sites in the municipality helps to render efficient services to people especially in far flung locations. Farm to Market roads were essential in bring goods and crops to the town's center.

=== Health ===
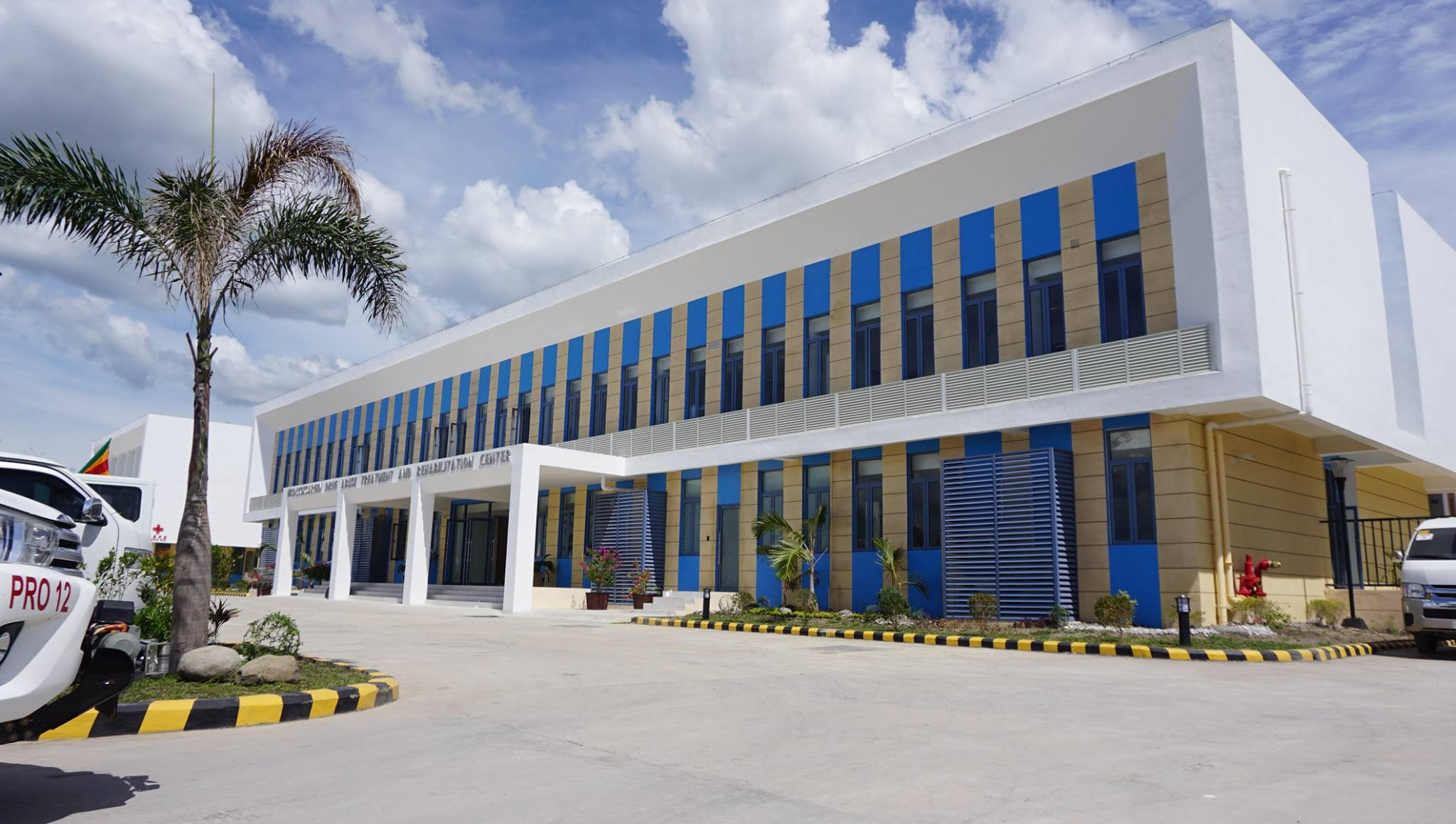
Soccsksargen Drug Abuse Treatment and Rehabilitation Center

Alabel Municipal Health Office was headed by Dr. Honorato Fabio. The Alabel Birthing Home was built to supplement the need of maternal health services.

The Rehabilitation Center in Kawas, Alabel, is a China-funded P350 million regional drug treatment and rehabilitation center. This facility will serve as rehabilitation center for drug dependents and users.

In 2016, Alabel received the DOH's prestigious award known as Red Orchid Award. The LGU-Alabel strict implementation of its No Smoking Policy bagged it Hall of Famer DOH's Red Orchid Award in 2018 DOH 12 Regional Awards.

=== Security ===
Peace and order in Alabel was maintain by Philippine National Police (PNP) and Armed Forces of the Philippines (AFP).

== Education ==
The Division office of the Department of Education (DEPED) Sarangani Province is located in the Provincial Compound in Alabel.

=== Elementary ===
- Alabel Central Integrated SPED Center – located in Poblacion, Alabel

=== Secondary ===
Alabel National High School was one of the many Tech-Voc School in the Province. It was established in 1960's as community high school.

The current vice mayor of Alabel, Ronnel Saldua Espaňol, MPA is one of the alumni of ANHS in the year 1992.

Alabel National Science High School, the only regional science high school in Soccsksargen, is located in Alabel. It was created through the initiative of the then Congressman James Chiongbian. It is the best performing school in Sarangani Province in the discipline of Math and Science. Its students have represented Alabel in many international research competition abroad.

=== Tertiary ===
- Primasia Foundation College Inc.

== Government ==
=== List of Alabel Mayors ===
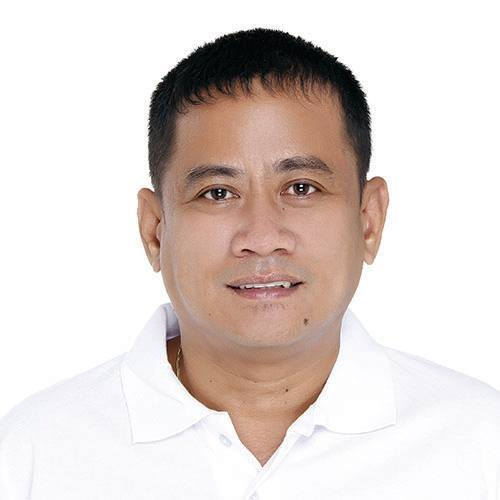
former Mayor Vic Paul Molina-Salarda

1. Lucio Alaba (1971–1986)
2. Hernando Sibugan (1986–1998)
3. Narciso Ra. Grafilo Jr. (1998–2007)
4. Corazon Sunga Grafilo (2007–2016)
5. Vic Paul Molina Salarda, MPA (2016–2025)
6. Lilibeth Jabilles Salarda, MPA (2025–Present)

=== List of Alabel Vice Mayors ===
1. Jose A. Orlino Jr. (1978–1986)
2. Honorio Cayetuna Navarro (1986–1993)
3. Narciso Ra. Grafilo Jr.(1993–1998)
4. Armando Chavez Rabia (1998–2001)
5. Virgilio Clark Tobias (Ret.) (2001–2004)
6. Ptr. Hermie Galzote (2004–2007)
7. Vic Paul Molina Salarda, MPA (2007–2016)
8. Ronnel Saldua Español, MPA (2016–2022)
9. Lente Lee Salway Jr. (2022–Present)

== Sister cities ==
- (Philippines) Makati, Metro Manila
