= Cordillera Regional Science High School =

Public high school in Benguet, Philippines

Location
- Wangal, La Trinidad, Benguet; 2601; Philippines; 16°27′17″N 120°34′15″E

Information
- Type: Public, science school
- Principal: Mr. Wilber G. Gondales
- Faculty: 16 teaching 6 non-teaching
- Grades: 7 to 12
- Enrollment: 358
- Campus: 1,732 sq.m

Cordillera Regional Science High School (CRSHS) is a public high school located in La Trinidad, Benguet, Philippines. It serves as the campus of the Regional Science High School Union system for the Cordillera Administrative Region.

Considered one of the most prestigious schools in the region, the school was established in November 18 on the Philippine school year 1994–1995.

== History ==
The school is among the eleven Regional Science High Schools established in the country in the school year 1994-1995 by virtue of DECS order No . 69, s. 1993. It is operated and supervised by the Department of Education. It is also dependent on funds provided by the Department of Education and not the Department of Science and Technology (DOST), as was a popular misconception.

The school opened in the school year 1994–1995 with an enrollment of 86 first-year students. It operated under the Benguet National High School until Republic Act No. 8376, authored by then Congressman Ronald M. Cosalan, entitled “An Act Establishing the Cordillera Regional Science High School in La Trinidad, Benguet and Appropriating Funds Therefor” was approved on November 13, 1997.

From June 1994 to December 1998, the school used the Benguet School Teacher's Association building in the barangay hall and warehouse at the Puguis Elementary School site for its classes.

The school was transferred to its present site at Wangal on January 4, 1999.

== School curriculum ==
CRSHS implements the curriculum for Regional Science High Schools prescribed by the Department of Education, which is different from the 2003 Basic Education Curriculum (BEC). The CRSHS curriculum is enriched with science, mathematics and English subjects, although Filipino, MAPE and TLE are also included. For Technology Livelihood and Economics (TLE), the only component offered is computer education and it is only given to the first and second year students.

The curriculum is prescribed by the Dep-Ed central office. The school year 2003-2004 was the first year of implementation of the 2003 Revised Curriculum for Regional Science High Schools. It was implemented in the First Year level, and the old students were left to graduate with the old curriculum. The main differences between the old and new curriculum are the time allotment and elective subjects.

== Physical facilities ==
=== Land ===
The school is located on a 1,732 square meter lot area adjacent to the Dep-Ed-CAR Regional office. The lot was donated by the Provincial government of Benguet through Governor Raul M. Molintas.

=== Building ===
There are two primary buildings, a laboratory complex, and an extension building. The two primary buildings consists of eight classrooms utilized for classes, a science laboratory room, a computer room, a faculty room, two offices, two female comfort rooms, and two male comfort rooms. The three classrooms of the first floor of the first building can be merged to form a multi-purpose hall for programs and events. The laboratory complex contains the physics and chemistry labs. In October 2016, a building with two classrooms, made for the senior high department, was completed after construction began in November 2015. It was turned over to the school on its foundation anniversary on November 9 later that year.

=== Equipment ===
Cordillera Regional Science High School is among the few schools in CAR that has various school equipment. Aside from the equipment received from other agencies, Dep-Ed CAR, and the division office of Benguet, it had been receiving a special MOOE fund of 2 million per year from CY 1997 to CY 2002. The amount has been used to purchase science, math and English equipment.

Based on the Regional Science High School manual issued by Dep-Ed, the maximum number of students per class is 36.
