= Kalalake National High School =

Public high school in Olongapo, Philippines

Location
- Olongapo City; Philippines
- 14°49′44″N 120°17′20″E

Information
- Type: Public Secondary
- Established: December 23, 1979
- Principal: Ricardo Aggabao
- Grades: 7 to 12
- Campus: 14th Street, New Kalalake, Olongapo City, Philippines
- Nickname: KNHS
- Newspaper: Ang Batingaw, The Gem

Kalalake National High school or (KNHS) is a Public-Based school located at 14th St. New Kalalake, Olongapo City, Philippines (near 14th St. gate) and founded on December 23, 1979. KNHS is based on 3 curriculums, which are K-12 curriculum & the Open High School Program.

== History ==
Kalalake National High School was founded in 1979. Due to changes in 2003, such as changing Department of Education, Culture and Sport (DECS) to Department of Education (DepEd), Kalalake High School was converted into Kalalake National High School.
