= Gerry Roxas Leadership Award =

National recognition in the Philippines

The Gerry Roxas Leadership Award (GRLA) is a prestigious national recognition in the Philippines bestowed upon outstanding high school graduates. Established in 1967 by the Gerry Roxas Foundation (GRF), the award is designed to honor students who exemplify the core values of integrity, service, and excellence. Over its 50-year history, it has become one of the most recognized youth leadership honors in the Philippines, with over 46,000 awardees recorded since its inception.

== History ==
The award traces its origins to the Roxas Educational Advancement Committee (REAC), founded in 1958 by Senator Gerardo "Gerry" M. Roxas to provide scholarships to underprivileged youth in the province of Capiz.

In 1967, the committee was reconstituted as the Roxas Educational and Welfare Committee, Inc. (REWC), and the scholarship program was expanded into a nationwide recognition project known as the Gerry Roxas Leadership Award. The initiative was intended to identify and nurture "the beginnings of individual excellence and leadership" among Filipino youth. Following the senator's death in 1982, the foundation was renamed the Gerry Roxas Foundation, which continues to administer the award today.

== Criteria and Selection ==
The award is conferred annually to a single graduating student (traditionally from Grade 10 or Grade 12, depending on the school's curriculum) from over 2,000 partner public and private high schools across the Philippines.

Candidates are evaluated based on the following pillars:

- Academic Excellence: The student must maintain high scholastic standing.
- Leadership: Evidence of active participation and leading roles in extra-curricular activities and campus organizations.
- Character: Adherence to the foundation's core values: Integrity, Service, and Excellence.

Recipients are traditionally presented with the Gerry Roxas Leadership Award Medallion, a gold-plated medal featuring the likeness of Senator Gerry Roxas, during their commencement exercises.

== Legacy and Impact ==
The GRLA serves as an entry point into the Academy of Leaders, a formation program managed by the foundation. This program provides awardees with opportunities for leadership training, community outreach, and internships during their collegiate years. The Gerry Roxas Leadership Awardees Student Society (GRLASS) and other alumni networks allow former recipients to collaborate on social development projects, including the Bayanihan Camp and Brigada Eskwela operations.

== Notable Past Awardees ==
The following notable past awardees have gone on to serve in various sectors of Philippine society, including the Catholic church, government, law, medicine, arts, and civil society. The foundation views the award not merely as a terminal honor, but as a lifelong commitment to nation-building.

- Luis Antonio Tagle
- Leila De Lima
- Dinky Soliman
- Prudencio Andaya Jr.
- Avelino Cruz Jr.
- Joey Lina
- Austere Panadero
- Mario Deriqulto
- Florencio Miraflores
- Joy Belmonte
- Manuel Tordesillas
- Charo Santos-Concio
- Josette Biyo
- Antonio Meloto
- Tonisito Umali
- Ramon Isberto
- Gary Granada
- Malou Mangahas
- Nicasio Conti
- Eduardo Oban
- Anthony Pangilinan
- Marissa Fernan
- Juan Mayo Ragragio
- Sitti Navarro

== See also ==
- Gerry Roxas
