= Chulak =

Chulak (Persian: چولك) may refer to:

- Chulak-e Asali, Hamadan Province
- Chulak Qapanuri, Hamadan Province
- Chulak-e Sadeqabad, Hamadan Province
- Chulak, Ilam
- Chulak, a fictional planet in the Stargate franchise

== See also ==
- Chulaki, Iran (disambiguation)
