= Chulaki, Iran =

Chulaki or Chuleki (Persian: چولكي), also rendered as Chaliki, may refer to:

- Chulaki (31°48′ N 49°52′ E), Izeh
- Chulaki (31°51′ N 50°01′ E), Izeh

== See also ==
- Chaliki
- Chulak (disambiguation)
