= List of earthquakes in 2017 =

Earthquakes in 2017
Approximate epicenters of notable earthquakes in 2017
- 4.0–5.9 magnitude
- 6.0–6.9 magnitude
- 7.0–7.9 magnitude
- 8.0+ magnitude
- Strongest: 8.2 M_{w} Mexico
- Deadliest: 7.3 M_{w} (Iran) Iran; 630 deaths
- Total fatalities: 1,246

Number by magnitude
- 9.0+: 0
- 8.0–8.9: 1
- 7.0–7.9: 6
- 6.0–6.9: 106
- 5.0–5.9: 1,451
- 4.0–4.9: 11,296

Map of earthquakes in 2017 as of December 31. A total of 12,797 earthquakes are plotted.

This is a list of earthquakes in 2017. Only earthquakes of magnitude 6 or above are included, unless they result in damage and/or casualties, or are notable for some other reason. All dates are listed according to UTC time. Maximum intensities are indicated on the Mercalli intensity scale and are sourced from United States Geological Survey (USGS) ShakeMap data. Major events took place in Iran and Mexico, with the latter experiencing two such events, one of them exceeding magnitude 8.

== Compared to other years ==
Number of earthquakes worldwide for 2007–2017
Magnitude	2007	2008	2009	2010	2011	2012	2013	2014	2015	2016	2017
8.0–9.9	4	0	1	1	1	2	2	1	1	0	1
7.0–7.9	14	12	16	21	19	15	17	11	18	16	6
6.0–6.9	178	168	144	151	204	129	125	140	124	128	106
5.0–5.9	2,074	1,768	1,896	1,963	2,271	1,412	1,402	1,475	1,413	1,502	1,451
4.0–4.9	12,080	12,292	6,805	10,164	13,303	10,990	9,795	13,494	13,239	12,771	11,296
Total	14,350	14,240	8,862	12,300	15,798	12,548	11,341	15,121	14,795	14,420	12,860

An increase in detected earthquake numbers does not necessarily represent an increase in earthquakes per se. Population increase, habitation spread, and advances in earthquake detection technology all contribute to higher earthquake numbers being recorded over time.

== By death toll ==
Rank	Death toll	Magnitude	Location	MMI	Depth (km)	Date
1	630	7.3	Iran, Kermanshah	IX (Violent)	19.0	November 12
2	370	7.1	Mexico, Puebla	IX (Violent)	48.0	September 19
3	98	8.2	Mexico, Chiapas offshore	IX (Violent)	47.4	September 7
4	34	5.7	Italy, Abruzzo	VIII (Severe)	7.0	January 18
5	25	6.5	China, Sichuan	VII (Very strong)	9.0	August 8
6	12	6.3	North Korea, Ryanggang	VI (Strong)	0.0	September 3

Listed are earthquakes with at least 10 dead.

== By magnitude ==
Rank	Magnitude	Death toll	Location	MMI	Depth (km)	Date
1	8.2	98	Mexico, Chiapas offshore	IX (Violent)	47.4	September 8
2	7.9	5	Papua New Guinea, Bougainville	IX (Violent)	135.0	January 22
3	7.7	0	Russia, Komandorski Islands offshore	VII (Very strong)	10.0	July 17
4	7.3	0	Philippines, Mindanao offshore	III (Weak)	627.2	January 10
4	7.3	630	Iran, Kermanshah	IX (Violent)	19.0	November 12
6	7.1	370	Mexico, Puebla	IX (Violent)	48.0	September 19
7	7.0	0	New Caledonia, Loyalty Islands offshore	VI (Strong)	10.0	November 19

Listed are earthquakes with at least 7.0 magnitude.

== By month ==
=== January ===
January
- Strongest: 7.9 M_{w} Papua New Guinea
- Deadliest: 5.7 M_{w} (Italy) Italy; 34 deaths
- Total fatalities: 46

Number by magnitude
- 8.0–8.9: 0
- 7.0–7.9: 2
- 6.0–6.9: 6
- 5.0–5.9: 146
- 4.0–4.9: 1002

Date	Country and location	M_{w}	Depth (km)	MMI	Notes	Casualties	
Date	Country and location	M_{w}	Depth (km)	MMI	Notes	Dead	Injured
2	Tonga offshore, 180 km northwest of the Minerva Reefs	6.3	551.6	II			
3	India, Tripura, 18 km east northeast of Ambassa	5.7	32.0	VI	2017 Tripura earthquake: One person died and five others were injured in India. 50 houses were damaged due to landslides that occurred in Dhalai district in the state of Tripura. Roads were blocked after numerous trees were uprooted. Two people died and three others were injured in neighboring Bangladesh.	3	8
3	Brazil, Maranhão, 21 km south southeast of Vargem Grande	4.5	10.0	V	Two apartments and a house were damaged.		
3	Fiji offshore, 225 km southwest of Nadi	6.9	12.0	IV	A tsunami warning was issued for Fiji, with waves of 0.01 m reported in Suva.		
3	Fiji offshore, 195 km southwest of Nadi	6.0	10.0	IV	This was an aftershock of the 6.9 quake.		
6	Iran, 74 km north northeast of Mohr	5.0	10.0	VI	Four people were killed in Seyfabad in Khonj County. Three people were injured in the village of Chartala.	4	3
8	Canada, Nunavut, 79 km east southeast of Resolute	6.0	31.0	VII	Homes suffered light damage in Resolute. A magnitude 5.2 aftershock struck 18 hours later. The 6.0 quake was a once-in-300-years event.		
10	Philippines offshore, 189 km south southeast of Tabialan	7.3	627.2	III			
10	Solomon Islands, 104 km west northwest of Kirakira	6.3	26.0	V	This was a foreshock of the 6.5 quake.		
11	Madagascar, 41 km south southwest of Betafo	5.5	7.3	VII	It was the strongest earthquake in the region since 1991. In Betafo, many houses collapsed and windows were shattered.		
16	Indonesia, North Sumatra, 14 km north northwest of Berastagi	5.6	6.0	VII	At least seven homes destroyed, 70 others, three schools and a mosque damaged in Karo Regency. Several houses damaged in Medan.		
18	Italy, 5 km east southeast of Cittareale	5.7	7.0	VI	January 2017 Central Italy earthquakes: Four earthquakes above 5.0 M_{w} occurred in less than 5 hours, with new damage recorded in Amatrice and Abruzzo. Two people died in Campotosto and three in Teramo. These earthquakes may have triggered an avalanche that struck a hotel in Farindola, killing 29 people and injuring 11.	34	11
18	Italy, 4 km southeast of Cittareale	5.6	10.0	VII	January 2017 Central Italy earthquakes: Four earthquakes above 5.0 M_{w} occurred in less than 5 hours, with new damage recorded in Amatrice and Abruzzo. Two people died in Campotosto and three in Teramo. These earthquakes may have triggered an avalanche that struck a hotel in Farindola, killing 29 people and injuring 11.	34	11
19	Solomon Islands, 65 km west of Kirakira	6.5	36.0	VI			
22	Papua New Guinea, 35 km west northwest of Panguna	7.9	135.0	IX	2017 Papua New Guinea earthquake: Damage occurred in Arawa and parts of central Bougainville, while a power outage occurred in Buka. One person was killed by rockfalls, while two young children and two teenagers were killed by landslides, with seventeen others injured, including two men, and fifteen children.	5	17
31	Ecuador, 28 km south of Esmeraldas	5.5	10.0	VI	There were reports of damage to several houses.		

=== February ===
February
- Strongest: 6.9 M_{w} Tonga
- Deadliest: 6.7 M_{w} Philippines; 8 deaths
- Total fatalities: 8

Number by magnitude
- 8.0–8.9: 0
- 7.0–7.9: 0
- 6.0–6.9: 5
- 5.0–5.9: 106
- 4.0–4.9: 774

Date	Country and location	M_{w}	Depth (km)	MMI	Notes	Casualties	
Date	Country and location	M_{w}	Depth (km)	MMI	Notes	Dead	Injured
3	France, Martinique offshore, 59 km east northeast of Sainte-Marie	5.8	44.0	V	One woman was injured. Objects fell on the floor in supermarkets.		1
6	Turkey, 23 km west northwest of Assos	5.2	7.2	VI	Around 90 houses in eleven villages were damaged. Five people were injured.		5
6	Colombia, 16 km east northeast of Colombia	5.5	38.0	V	Some damage was reported in the town of Colombia. One person was injured. Roads were blocked by falling rocks.		1
6	India, Uttarakhand state, 36 km northwest of Pipalkoti	5.1	16.1	IV	One person was injured, with panic scenes around the epicenter. Many cracks in buildings were reported.		1
7	Pakistan, 22 km west southwest of Pasni	6.3	29.1	VI	60 houses collapsed in Pasni, where one girl was injured by a falling wall.		1
8	China, Yunnan, 28 km northwest of Zhaotong	4.9	10.0		Five people were injured in Ludian County and some old houses collapsed.		5
10	Philippines, 11 km north of Surigao City	6.5	15.0	VII	2017 Surigao earthquake: Multiple buildings were damaged in Surigao City and seven bridges collapsed, isolating San Francisco. At least eleven towns were affected, including by a power outage. The airport was closed due to the damaged runway. Eight people died and 250 others were injured.	8	250
10	Taiwan, 18 km south of Tainan	5.3	15.8	VI	Four people were injured in Tainan and Kaohsiung. Grocery stores sustained minor damage.		4
15	Indonesia, Aceh, 15 km southeast of Sigli	5.4	13.0	rowspan="2"| Two earthquakes hit a region of Aceh previously affected by the 2016 Aceh earthquake in rapid succession. Two houses collapsed and nine people suffered injuries.		9	
15	Indonesia, Aceh, 15 km west northwest of Meureudu	5.0	10.0	V		9	
18	Argentina, Jujuy Province, 52 km northwest of San Antonio de los Cobres	6.4	222.0	IV			
21	Bolivia, 41 km east of Padilla	6.5	596.0	III			
23	Philippines, 3 km west southwest of Davao City	4.7	11.9	V	Two women were injured when a waiting shed fell on them in Davao City.		2
24	Zambia, 40 km east of Kaputa	5.9	30.0	VI	Various houses were damaged in Kaputa District, leaving 11 families homeless. Five people were injured.		5
24	Tonga offshore, 43 km north northwest of the Minerva Reefs	6.9	414.5	III			

=== March ===
March
- Strongest: 6.6 M_{w} Russia
- Deadliest: 5.1 M_{w} Myanmar; 2 deaths
- Total fatalities: 4

Number by magnitude
- 8.0–8.9: 0
- 7.0–7.9: 0
- 6.0–6.9: 6
- 5.0–5.9: 129
- 4.0–4.9: 863

Date	Country and location	M_{w}	Depth (km)	MMI	Notes	Casualties	
Date	Country and location	M_{w}	Depth (km)	MMI	Notes	Dead	Injured
2	Turkey, 5 km northwest of Samsat	5.6	10.0	VII	At least thirty people were injured and some buildings collapsed.		30
4	Solomon Islands, 115 km south southeast of Panguna, Papua New Guinea	6.1	17.0	VI			
5	Philippines, 4 km north of Surigao City	5.7	10.5	VI	One person died of a heart attack, 45 others were injured and some walls collapsed. This was an aftershock of the 6.7 quake.	1	45
5	Papua New Guinea, 31 km northwest of Kandrian	6.3	37.0	VI			
10	Spain, 11 km north of Olza	4.1	2.7	VI	Cracks appeared in walls and road surfaces and some windows broke.		
13	Myanmar, 36 km southeast of Tharrawaddy	5.1	10.0	VI	Some temples were damaged in Yangon and 38 people were injured. Two of them died later in the hospital.	2	36
14	India, Andaman and Nicobar Islands offshore, 230 km south southwest of Mohean	6.0	10.0	III			
19	Solomon Islands, 70 km north of Auki	6.0	8.4	VI			
20	Philippines, Central Visayas, 6 km north of Buanoy	4.3	51.2	V	At least 22 schools in Balamban suffered cracks on walls.	–	-
21	Indonesia, Bali, 6 km east northeast of Ubud	5.6	111.7	V	Various houses, temples, offices and schools were damaged during the quake. Four people, included three children, were injured.		4
24	Egypt, 69 km northwest of Suez	4.1	1.6		One person died and seven others were injured after a poorly constructed building collapsed.	1	7
26	China, Yunnan, 54 km northwest of Dali	5.0	27.6	V	About 500 houses were damaged and some collapsed. One person was injured by falling tiles.		1
27	United States, Alaska, 63 km west of Attu Station	6.2	20.0	V			
29	Russia, Kamchatka, 81 km north northeast of Ust-Kamchatsk	6.6	17.0	VII			
29	Mexico, Sinaloa offshore, 71 km west southwest of Las Grullas Margen Derecha	5.7	17.0	IV	Some buildings and schools suffered light damage in Cajeme.		

=== April ===
April
- Strongest: 6.9 M_{w} Chile; 6.9 M_{w} Philippines
- Deadliest: 6.1 M_{w} Iran; 2 deaths
- Total fatalities: 3

Number by magnitude
- 8.0–8.9: 0
- 7.0–7.9: 0
- 6.0–6.9: 7
- 5.0–5.9: 129
- 4.0–4.9: 953

Date	Country and location	M_{w}	Depth (km)	MMI	Notes	Casualties	
Date	Country and location	M_{w}	Depth (km)	MMI	Notes	Dead	Injured
2	Panama, 18 km northeast of Cerro Punta	5.3	10.0	VII	Two buildings were damaged. Some objects fell in supermarkets.		
3	South Africa, 7 km south southeast of Stilfontein	5.2	5.0	VII	Plaster fell from walls and houses were slightly damaged in Orkney and Klerksdorp.		
3	Botswana, 132 km west southwest of Moiyabana	6.5	29.0	VIII	The 2017 Botswana earthquake was the strongest earthquake recorded in Botswana since 1952. Thirty-six students were injured in a stampede sparked by the quake.		36
4	Philippines, 5 km west of Batangas City	5.1	18.2	VI	2017 Batangas earthquakes: The earthquake damaged houses in Batangas City and the Taal Basilica. Some power outages occurred in San Pascual. This was a foreshock of the 5.9 quake.		
5	Iran, 61 km north northwest of Torbat-e Jam	6.1	13.0	VII	40% of buildings have been ruined in four villages. Some houses and buildings were seriously damaged in Mashhad. Phone lines were disrupted. Two people were killed and 34 others injured.	2	34
5	Greece, 1 km west southwest of Nafpaktos	4.8	10.0	VII	Older buildings suffered minor damage, with bricks and stones falling into the streets below. A power outage occurred in the town of Rio.		
8	Philippines, 1 km north northwest of Talaga	5.9	14.3	VI	2017 Batangas earthquakes: Houses and buildings were damaged, landslides occurred at Mount Macolod and power outages were reported. Six people were injured. Around 14,000 people were temporarily relocated to evacuation centers.		6
8	Albania, Lezhë, 8 km northeast of Rrëshen	4.8	27.8	VI	Dozens of buildings were damaged and landslides occurred in the epicentral area.		
10	El Salvador, 4 km west southwest of Tonacatepeque	4.8	10.0	VII	The earthquake damaged houses in Antiguo Cuscatlán and caused landslides as well as power failures in some areas. One person died and three others were injured when a falling rock hit their car on a highway.	1	3
11	Philippines, 8 km north of Osias	5.8	8.3	VII	About 500 homes and 2 mosques were damaged in Lanao del Sur. Power failures also occurred and cracks appeared on the national highway. One person was injured.		1
15	Chile, 62 km southeast of San Pedro de Atacama	6.3	155.0	IV			
18	Fiji, 245 km east of Levuka	6.0	628.0	II			
23	Chile offshore, 37 km west of Valparaíso	6.0	21.0	V	This was a foreshock of the 6.9 quake.		
24	Chile offshore, 40 km west of Valparaíso	6.9	28.0	VII	2017 Valparaiso earthquake: Santiago International Airport suffered light damage on floors and ceilings. A car was hit by a falling rock on a service road near a highway.		
28	Philippines, 31 km southwest of Burias	6.9	26.0	VI	Several buildings were damaged and at least one house collapsed. Five people were injured.		5

=== May ===
May
- Strongest: 6.8 M_{w} Vanuatu
- Deadliest: 5.4 M_{w} China; 8 deaths
- Total fatalities: 12

Number by magnitude
- 8.0–8.9: 0
- 7.0–7.9: 0
- 6.0–6.9: 11
- 5.0–5.9: 139
- 4.0–4.9: 930

Date	Country and location	M_{w}	Depth (km)	MMI	Notes	Casualties	
Date	Country and location	M_{w}	Depth (km)	MMI	Notes	Dead	Injured
1	Canada, British Columbia, 88 km west northwest of Mosquito Lake, United States	6.2	10.0	rowspan="2"|This pair of similarly sized quakes occurring in close proximity is an example of a doublet earthquake. Some buildings were damaged and power outages occurred in Yukon Territory and Alaska.			
1	Canada, British Columbia, 88 km west northwest of Mosquito Lake, United States	6.3	2.5	VIII			
2	Iran, 65 km north of Torbat-e Jam	5.1	10.0	VI	Two people were injured. This was an aftershock of the 6.1 quake on April 5.		2
3	Tajikistan, 29 km north northwest of Karakenja	6.0	11.0	VII	Two houses were partially damaged in Tajikistan. In Kyrgyzstan, a rockfall killed 110 sheep, over 100 buildings were damaged, and one man was injured by a falling wall.		1
4	China, Sichuan, 38 km south southeast of Xunchang	4.9	10.0	Numerous buildings were severely damaged, and five people were injured.		5	
8	United States, Alaska, 135 km west of Adak	6.2	13.0	VI			
9	Japan, 110 km east southeast of Hirara, Okinawa Prefecture	6.0	10.0	IV			
9	Vanuatu, 59 km north northeast of Port-Olry	6.8	169.0	V			
10	China, Xinjiang, 131 km east southeast of Murghab, Tajikistan	5.4	7.6	VII	Eight people were killed and 29 injured. Some people were buried after their houses collapsed. In Quzgun village, the quake caused the collapse of 1,520 houses. 9,200 people have been relocated.	8	29
10	South Georgia and the South Sandwich Islands offshore, 95 km east northeast of Visokoi Island	6.5	15.0	IV			
11	Azerbaijan, 16 km east southeast of Tel'manked	5.1	62.9	IV	Twenty people were injured in Parsabad, Iran.		20
11	Turkey, 13 km north northeast of Aşkale	5.1	13.4	VII	Twenty-five houses were damaged in Aşkale.		
12	El Salvador offshore, 78 km south southwest of Acajutla	6.2	16.0	IV			
13	Iran, 34 km north northwest of Bojnurd	5.6	8.0	VIII	Three people were killed and more than 400 were injured near Pasandarreh. Some buildings were damaged and several roads blocked.	3	417
15	Papua New Guinea, 40 km east northeast of Rabaul	6.2	10.0	VII			
16	Peru, 25 km west southwest of Cotaruse	5.4	10.0	VII	This earthquake caused landslides in Ayacucho region, and various schools were slightly damaged. Seven houses were damaged and two destroyed while eight people were displaced.		
20	Philippines, 25 km south of Alburquerque	6.0	533.0	II			
24	Albania, 8 km north northwest of Bulqizë	4.5	10.0	IV	In Mat municipality, 7 homes and a health center suffered cracked walls while 3 schools in Bulqiza municipality suffered minor damage.		
24	Indonesia, South Sulawesi, 138 km north northwest of Kendari	5.7	10.0	VII	Dozens of houses were damaged in Morowali Regency.		
25	Tanzania, 22 km west southwest of Misasi	4.4	10.0	V	Eighteen students were injured in a panic caused by the earthquake. One policeman also died of a heart attack.	1	18
27	Turkey, 10 km northwest of Gölmarmara	5.1	10.0	VII	Various houses were badly damaged in Manisa province. One person was also injured.		1
29	Poland, Silesia, 4 km southeast of Katowice	3.3	10.0	-	The quake caused a mine collapse in the Mysłowice-Wesoła Coal Mine, injuring three miners.		3
29	Indonesia, Central Sulawesi, 37 km west northwest of Poso	6.6	12.0	VII	Hundreds of buildings were damaged in Poso as well as surrounding villages, and some collapsed. Twenty-five people were injured, with 5 of them in a serious condition.		25

=== June ===
June
- Strongest: 6.9 M_{w} Guatemala
- Deadliest: 6.9 M_{w} Guatemala; 5 deaths
- Total fatalities: 7

Number by magnitude
- 8.0–8.9: 0
- 7.0–7.9: 0
- 6.0–6.9: 10
- 5.0–5.9: 90
- 4.0–4.9: 839

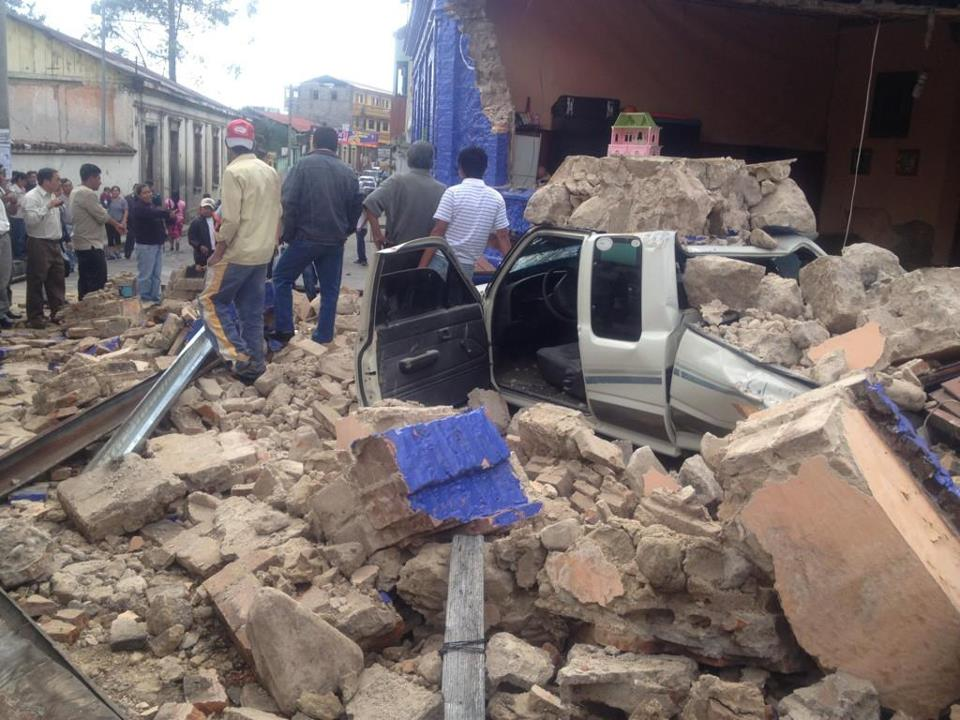
Damage caused by the earthquake in San Marcos, Guatemala.

Date	Country and location	M_{w}	Depth (km)	MMI	Notes	Casualties	
Date	Country and location	M_{w}	Depth (km)	MMI	Notes	Dead	Injured
2	United States, Alaska offshore, 200 km northwest of Attu Station	6.8	5.0	IV			
3	China, Gansu, 60 km east of Wuwei	4.9	10.0	III	220 houses were damaged by the quake, 67 of them severely.		
5	Ecuador, 36 km east southeast of Cañaveral, Peru	5.6	49.0	V	Some houses were damaged in Peru and Ecuador near the epicenter. Two people were injured in Piura province.		2
12	Greece, 5 km south of Plomari	6.3	12.0	VIII	2017 Lesbos earthquake: Many houses were damaged in Plomari and some collapsed. The village of Vrisa, where one woman was found dead, was almost completely destroyed. The quake left 15 people injured and displaced 800. The quake was felt across Greece, Turkey, and Bulgaria.	1	15
14	Guatemala, 2 km south southwest of San Pablo	6.9	93.0	VI	2017 Guatemala earthquake: Five people died (three of heart attacks) and 19 others were injured in Guatemala. A lot of houses were damaged in San Marcos department and landslides also occurred. In Mexico, 11 people were injured in neighbouring Chiapas.	5	30
15	New Zealand offshore, 129 km northeast of L'Esperance Rock, Kermadec Islands	6.0	34.0	III			
17	Tonga offshore, 110 km west southwest of Minerva Reefs	6.1	511.0	II			
21	Nepal, Makwampur district	3.2			A labourer working at a brick factory was killed when bricks fell on him. His son also sustained injuries.	1	1
22	Guatemala offshore, 28 km southwest of Puerto San Jose	6.8	38.1	VI	Houses were damaged in Antigua Guatemala. San Marcos department suffered new damage after the 6.9 quake on June 14. Four people were injured during this earthquake.		4
24	Peru, 14 km northeast of Cahuacho	5.7	97.0	IV	Some adobe houses collapsed in Caraveli province.		
25	Japan, 31 km east northeast of Gero	5.2	10.0	V	Two people were injured, some landslides occurred and various houses were slightly damaged.		2
25	Tonga offshore, 198 km west of Pangai	6.0	10.0	IV			
26	Iran, Gilan, 23 km east southeast of Khalkhal	4.1	10.0	V	Minor damage and two people were slightly injured.		2
28	New Zealand offshore, 117 km south of Raoul Island, Kermadec Islands	6.0	19.0	rowspan="2"|These were aftershocks of the 6.0 quake on June 15.			
29	New Zealand offshore, 116 km west northwest of L'Esperance Rock, Kermadec Islands	6.0	404.8	III			
30	Ecuador, 35 km north northwest of Bahía de Caráquez	6.0	13.0	VII	One house collapsed and minor damage occurred in many areas. Thirteen people were slightly injured.		13

=== July ===
July
- Strongest: 7.7 M_{w} Russia
- Deadliest: 6.5 M_{w} Philippines; 4 deaths
- Total fatalities: 7

Number by magnitude
- 8.0–8.9: 0
- 7.0–7.9: 1
- 6.0–6.9: 9
- 5.0–5.9: 100
- 4.0–4.9: 1109

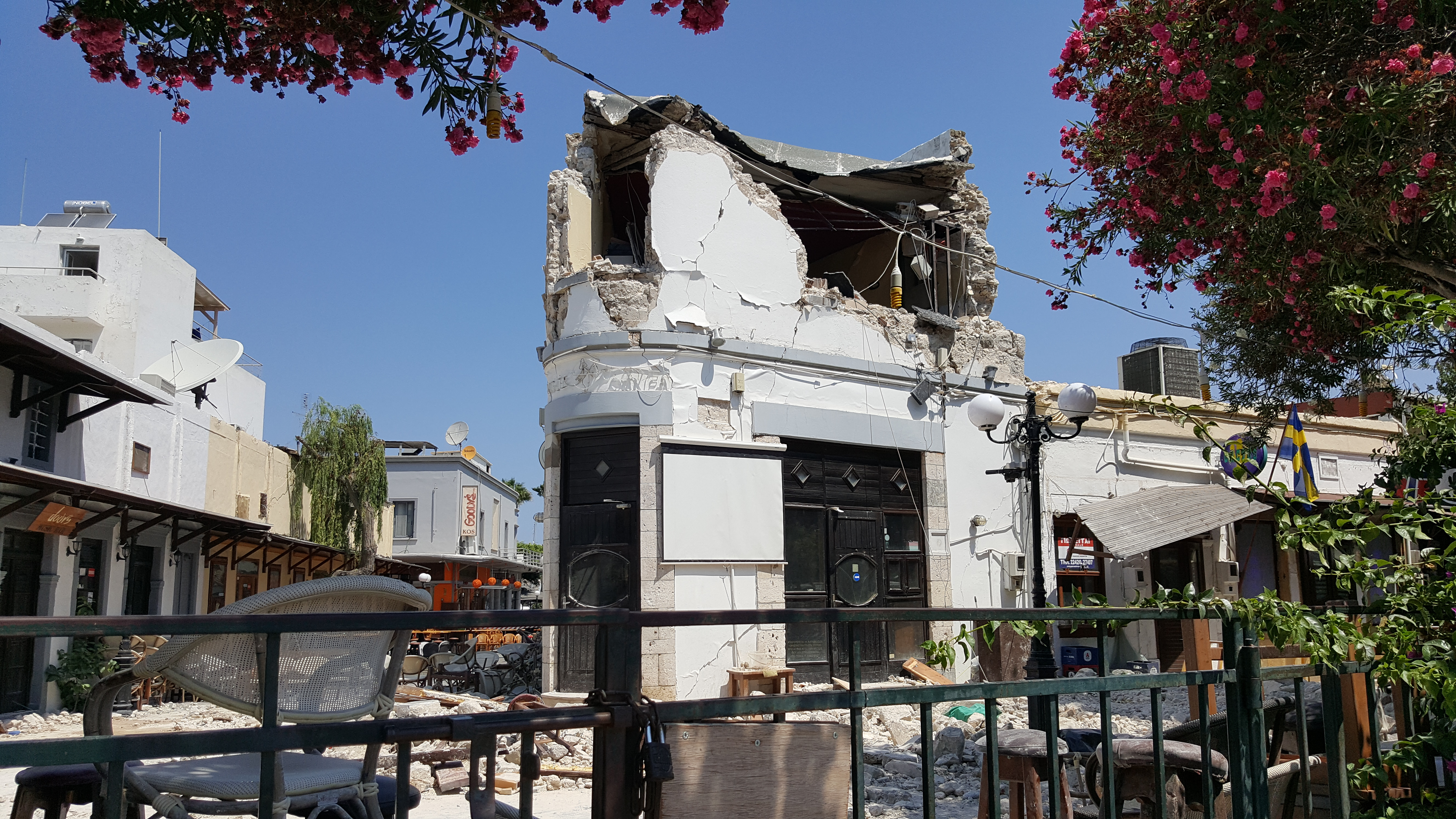
A damaged bar in Kos, Greece

Date	Country and location	M_{w}	Depth (km)	MMI	Notes	Casualties	
Date	Country and location	M_{w}	Depth (km)	MMI	Notes	Dead	Injured
1	Japan, 22 km east of Chitose	5.3	36.7	VI	A woman broke her ribs when she fell during the earthquake.		1
3	North Macedonia, 8 km northwest of Jankovec	4.8	10.0	V	This quake caused a power outage in Ohrid; some supermarkets and other buildings were slightly damaged as well.		
6	United States, Montana, 11 km southeast of Lincoln	5.8	12.2	VII	It was the strongest earthquake in Montana since 1975. It caused power outages in Lincoln and at least one gas leak in Helena.		
6	Philippines, 2 km south of Masarayao	6.5	9.0	VIII	The 2017 Leyte earthquake caused power interruption in Jaro and Tacloban City in Leyte. The quake was felt in places as far apart as Sorsogon in Luzon and Surigao del Norte in Mindanao. In Kananga, a commercial building collapsed, one person died, and 20 were injured. In Ormoc City, three people died and around 100 were injured.	4	120+
10	Philippines, 5 km northwest of San Pedro	5.8	7.1	VI	Some damage and five people were injured, two of them by jumping from a hotel's window in Ormoc City. This was an aftershock of the 6.5 quake on July 6.		5
11	New Zealand offshore, 204 km northwest of Auckland Island	6.6	10.0	IV			
13	Papua New Guinea, 115 km east southeast of Kokopo	6.4	34.0	VI			
14	Indonesia, North Sumatra, 13 km northwest of Padangsidempuan	4.9	10.0		One person was wounded and dozens of houses were damaged.		1
17	Russia, Kamchatka offshore, 183 km east southeast of Nikol'skoye	6.3	9.0	V	This was a foreshock of the 7.7 quake.		
17	Russia, Kamchatka offshore, 202 km east southeast of Nikol'skoye	7.7	10.0	VII	The 2017 Komandorski Islands earthquake was recognized as a supershear event. A tsunami warning was issued, and a slight sea surge was observed in the Aleutian Islands.		
18	Peru, 22 km south of Atico	6.4	43.7	VI	Roads were blocked by falling rocks in Arequipa region. One truck driver was killed and nine people were injured.	1	9
19	Mauritius offshore, 405 km northwest of Rodrigues Island	6.0	10.0	II			
20	Turkey, Greece, 11 km east northeast of Kos, Greece	6.6	7.0	VII	The 2017 Aegean Sea earthquake killed two people and injured more than 120 others on the Greek island of Kos, while at least 360 injuries were reported in Turkey. A small tsunami caused flooding and some damage along the Greek and Turkish coasts. The quake was felt as far south as Egypt and as far north as Romania.	2	481+
23	Iran, 52 km east southeast of Kerman	5.2	10.0	VI	Some buildings were damaged and cracks on walls appeared. Power lines were broken in the region.		
26	Japan offshore, 176 km south southeast of Naze	6.0	12.0	III			
27	North Atlantic Ocean, 977 km north northeast of Sinnamary, French Guiana	6.0	10.0	I			
28	Iran, 12 km southwest of Gamasb	4.7	10.0	V	Some damage to buildings and 15 people were injured.		15
30	Iran, 49 km south of Farsan	5.0	10.0	VI	This quake damaged rural buildings and cut phone and power lines in Naghan County.		25

=== August ===
August
- Strongest: 6.6 M_{w} Ascension Island, United Kingdom
- Deadliest: 6.5 M_{w} China; 25 deaths
- Total fatalities: 31

Number by magnitude
- 8.0–8.9: 0
- 7.0–7.9: 0
- 6.0–6.9: 8
- 5.0–5.9: 112
- 4.0–4.9: 853

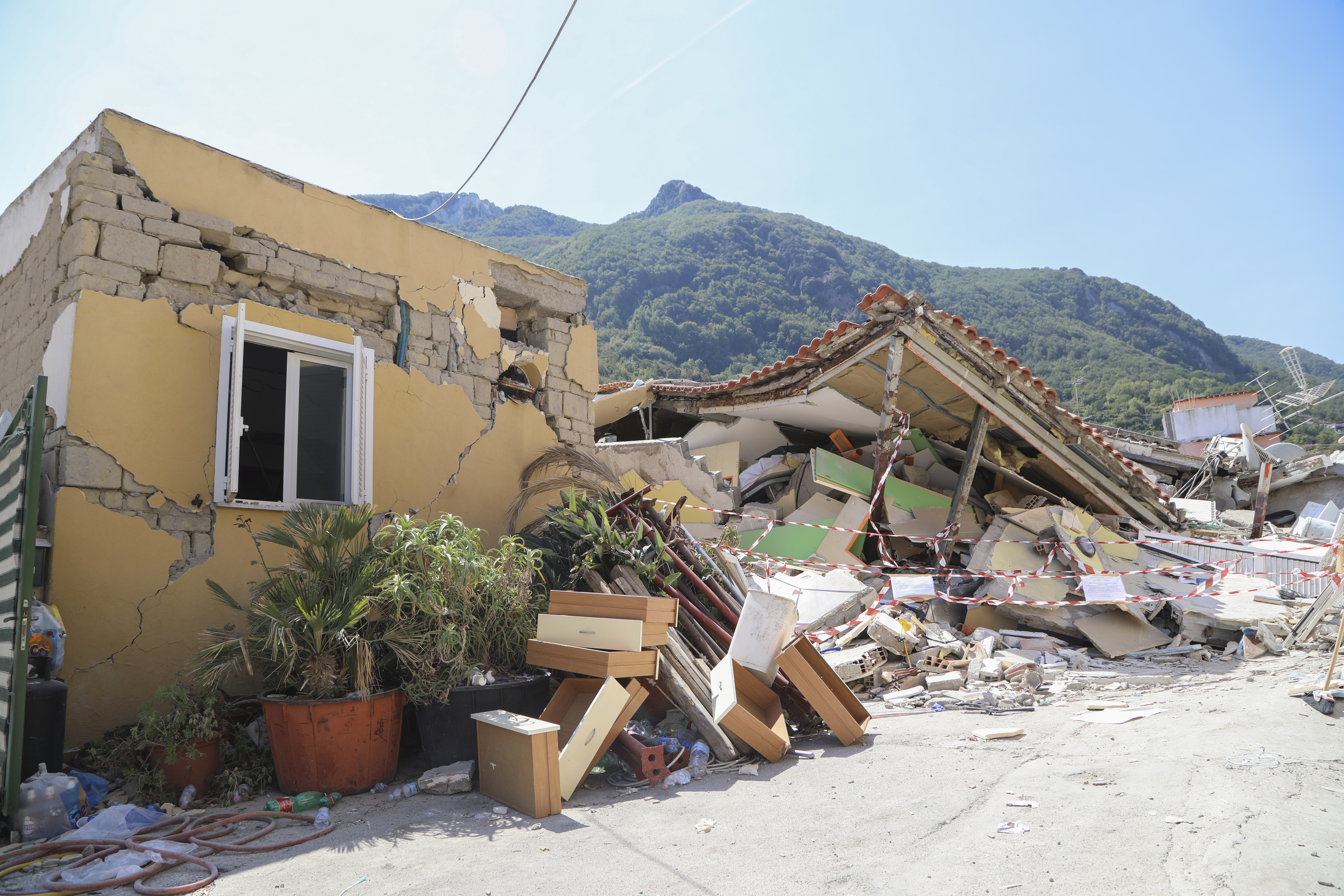
Damage to buildings caused by the earthquake in Italy.

Date	Country and location	M_{w}	Depth (km)	MMI	Notes	Casualties	
Date	Country and location	M_{w}	Depth (km)	MMI	Notes	Dead	Injured
1	Japan, 6 km west of Kitaibaraki	5.2	8.3	VI	A woman fell from her bed and sustained injuries in Chiba.		1
2	Chile, Santiago Metropolitan Region, 8 km north northeast of Chicureo Abajo	5.4	92.0	V	An elderly man died of cardiac arrest in Maipú.	1	
5	Philippines, 6 km west northwest of Little Baguio	5.1	20.8	VI	Some houses were damaged in Bukidnon. An elderly woman was injured by falling debris.		1
8	China, Sichuan, 168 km southwest of Mawu	6.5	9.0	VII	The 2017 Jiuzhaigou earthquake killed 25 people, including numerous tourists, and 525 others were injured, with 45 of them in serious condition. Many houses were damaged and landslides occurred.	25	525
8	China, Xinjiang, 102 km north northwest of Xinyuan	6.3	20.0	VII	Due to the 2017 Jinghe earthquake, more than 1,000 houses were damaged, including 142 which collapsed, and 33 people were injured.		33
11	Philippines, 1 km southeast of Tuy	6.2	172.0	IV	2017 Batangas earthquakes: Buildings and schools were evacuated in Manila, where the quake was felt moderately.		
11	Peru, 18 km east southeast of Atico	5.6	41.0	V	This earthquake caused landslides in Arequipa region. One driver was killed by falling rocks and two others were injured.	1	2
13	Indonesia, Bengkulu Province, 71 km west of Bengkulu	6.4	31.0	V	The quake caused power outages.		
13	Peru, Pasco, 41 km east northeast of Santa Rosa	5.8	32.0	VI	Several windows and lamps were damaged by the quake. Several people were injured in Satipo while fleeing in panic.		Several
18	United Kingdom, Ascension Island offshore, 763 km north of Georgetown	6.6	35.0	I			
19	Fiji, 195 km east of Levuka	6.4	544.0	III			
21	Italy, 4 km north northeast of Casamicciola Terme	4.2	2.7	VIII	The 2017 Ischia earthquake caused major damage in Ischia despite its moderate magnitude; several buildings and a church collapsed. Two people died and 42 were injured. Three children were trapped under the rubble.	2	42
22	Philippines, 0 km east northeast of Talisayan	5.0	17.2	V	Two people were killed and 56 houses slightly damaged.	2	
23	Iraq, 29 km east northeast of Koy Sanjaq	5.1	8.0	VII	Damage to buildings in Kurdistan region. 17 people were injured.		17
27	Papua New Guinea offshore, 110 km northeast of Lorengau	6.3	8.0	IV			
27	Iran, 52 km north of Hashtrud	5.2	17.3	VI	Some damage to buildings in Sharabian Rural District. Thirteen people were injured.		13
30	Venezuela, 25 km north northeast of Guatire	4.5	11.0	IV	Two people were injured during panic movements in Caracas. Slight damage was observed in Guatire.		2
31	Indonesia, West Sumatra, 76 km southwest of Pariaman	6.3	43.1	V			

=== September ===
September
- Strongest: 8.2 M_{w} Mexico
- Deadliest: 7.1 M_{w} Mexico; 370 deaths
- Total fatalities: 486

Number by magnitude
- 8.0–8.9: 1
- 7.0–7.9: 1
- 6.0–6.9: 8
- 5.0–5.9: 136
- 4.0–4.9: 1221

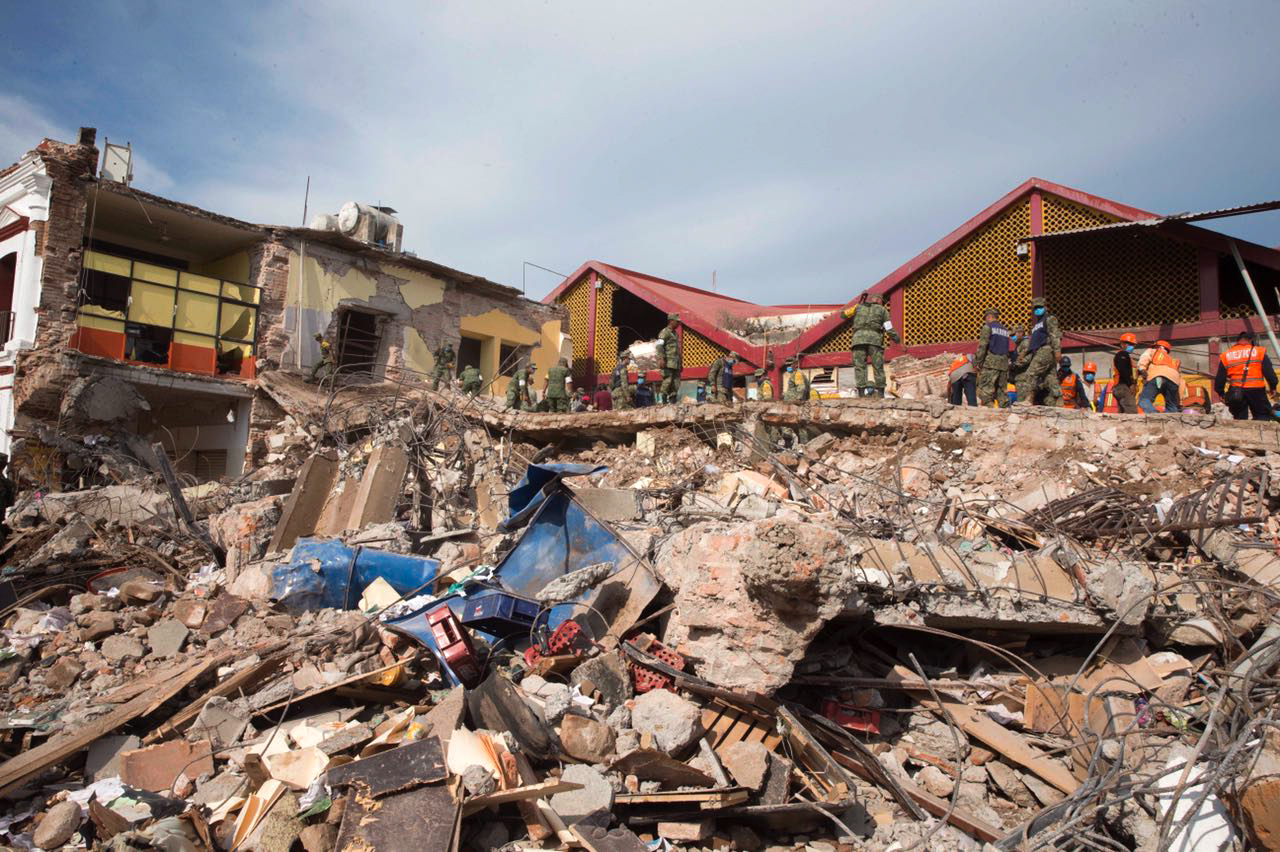
Municipal Palace of Juchitán de Zaragoza, collapsed by the September 8 earthquake

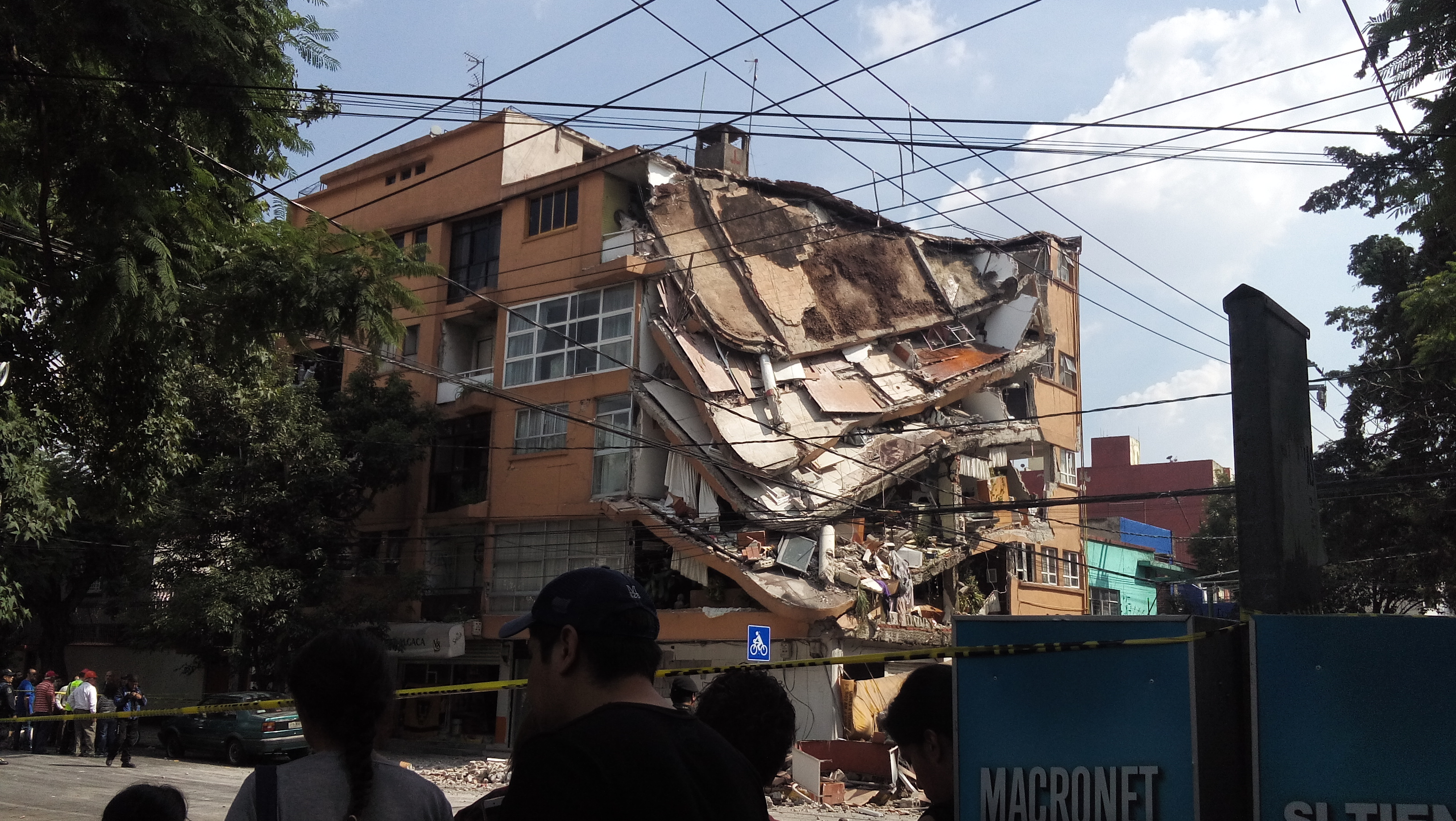
Buildings collapsed in Mexico City after the earthquake in September 19

Date	Country and location	M_{w}	Depth (km)	MMI	Notes	Casualties	
Date	Country and location	M_{w}	Depth (km)	MMI	Notes	Dead	Injured
2	Haiti, 10 km west southwest of Thomonde	4.3	9.4	IV	One person was injured. Six homes and a school suffered damage.		1
3	North Korea, Ryanggang, 21 km east northeast of Sungjibaegam	6.3	0.0	VI	The 2017 North Korea earthquake was among the largest ever to have been caused by a nuclear explosion. "Dozens" were reported to be killed or injured. Several civilian houses, and a school with around 150 students inside collapsed.	"Dozens"	
4	United Kingdom, South Georgia and the South Sandwich Islands offshore, 150 km southeast of Visokoi Island	6.1	25.0	IV			
7	Japan offshore, 250 km west northwest of Chichijima	6.1	451.0	II			
8	Mexico, Chiapas offshore, 91 km southwest of El Palmarcito	8.2	47.4	IX	The 2017 Chiapas earthquake caused widespread damage in southern Mexico, especially in Oaxaca, Chiapas and Tabasco. Many buildings were destroyed. 98 people died (78 in Oaxaca, 16 in Chiapas and 4 in Tabasco) and more than 300 were injured. Some damage also occurred in Guatemala, where 4 people were injured. This was the largest earthquake of 2017.	98	304+
14	Peru, 11 km north northwest of Lahuaytambo	4.6	10.0	V	One person was injured by falling rocks in Matucana.		1
16	China, Xinjiang, 72 km northeast of Kuqa	5.4	16.0	-	55 buildings were damaged, including 50 apartment buildings.		
18	Brazil, Paraná	4.5	53.0	-	There were reports of damage to some buildings.		
19	Mexico, Puebla, 1 km south of Matzaco	7.1	48.0	IX	The 2017 Puebla earthquake occurred just two hours after an earthquake drill done yearly on the anniversary of the 1985 Mexico earthquake. Widespread damage in Mexico City, Morelos and Puebla. Many buildings collapsed. 370 people were killed (228 in Mexico City, 74 in Morelos, 46 in Puebla, 15 in Mexico State, 6 in Guerrero and 1 in Oaxaca) and more than 6,000 injured.	370	6,011
20	New Zealand offshore, 247 km west of Auckland Island	6.1	8.0	III			
20	Japan offshore, 282 km east southeast of Kamaishi	6.1	11.0	III			
20	Vanuatu, 85 km north northwest of Isangel	6.4	197.0	IV			
23	Mexico, Oaxaca, 7 km north northeast of Ixtepec	6.1	10.0	VI	A bridge collapsed in Oaxaca and some additional damage occurred after the 8.2 earthquake on September 8. Four people died and seven others were injured. Two women also died of a heart attack in Mexico City.	6	7
23	Philippines, 3 km east of Malinao	5.7	8.2	VII	58 houses were totally destroyed in Bukidnon province. Various schools also suffered damage. 10 people were injured.		10
26	Tonga offshore, south of the Fiji Islands	6.4	96.0	IV			
28	Indonesia, North Maluku offshore, 15 km north northwest of Sofifi	4.6	17.0	-	1,350 buildings were damaged and 150 others were destroyed. Two people were injured. It is the largest in a swarm of 1,500 earthquakes (40 of them felt) since September 26.		2

=== October ===
October
- Strongest: 6.8 M_{w} New Caledonia, France
- Deadliest: 6.1 M_{w} Indonesia; 1 death
- Total fatalities: 1

Number by magnitude
- 8.0–8.9: 0
- 7.0–7.9: 0
- 6.0–6.9: 10
- 5.0–5.9: 110
- 4.0–4.9: 911

Date	Country and location	M_{w}	Depth (km)	MMI	Notes	Casualties	
Date	Country and location	M_{w}	Depth (km)	MMI	Notes	Dead	Injured
6	Japan offshore, 259 km east southeast of Ishinomaki	6.2	9.0	III			
8	Tonga offshore, 156 km northwest of Pangai	6.1	10.0	IV			
8	Antarctica offshore, Balleny Islands region	6.2	10.0	I			
8	United States, Alaska offshore, 247 km east southeast of Attu Station	6.5	119.0	V			
10	Chile, 58 km east of Arica	6.3	85.0	V	Some landslides blocked roads in Arica region. Seven people were injured.		7
10	Norway offshore, Bouvet Island region	6.7	9.0	I			
18	Tonga offshore, 103 km southeast of Pangai	6.1	10.0	IV			
22	New Zealand, Canterbury, 100 km north northeast of Amberley	5.0	10.0	VI	Landslides occurred in Kaikōura.		
24	Indonesia, East Nusa Tenggara, 181 km north northeast of Maumere	6.7	553.8	III			
28	Russia, Arkhangelsk Oblast offshore, 560 km north of Franz Josef Land	5.9	10.0	I	It was the most northern earthquake having a magnitude higher than 5.5 M_{w} ever recorded.		
31	New Caledonia offshore, 132 km east of Tadine	6.7	24.0	IV	This was a foreshock of the 7.0 quake on November 19.		
31	Indonesia, Maluku, 48 km west of Ambon	6.1	6.0	VI	An airport tower and 14 houses suffered damage. One person died of a heart attack.	1	

=== November ===
November
- Strongest: 7.3 M_{w} (Iran) Iran
- Deadliest: 7.3 M_{w} (Iran) Iran; 630 deaths
- Total fatalities: 634

Number by magnitude
- 8.0–8.9: 0
- 7.0–7.9: 2
- 6.0–6.9: 14
- 5.0–5.9: 154
- 4.0–4.9: 1109

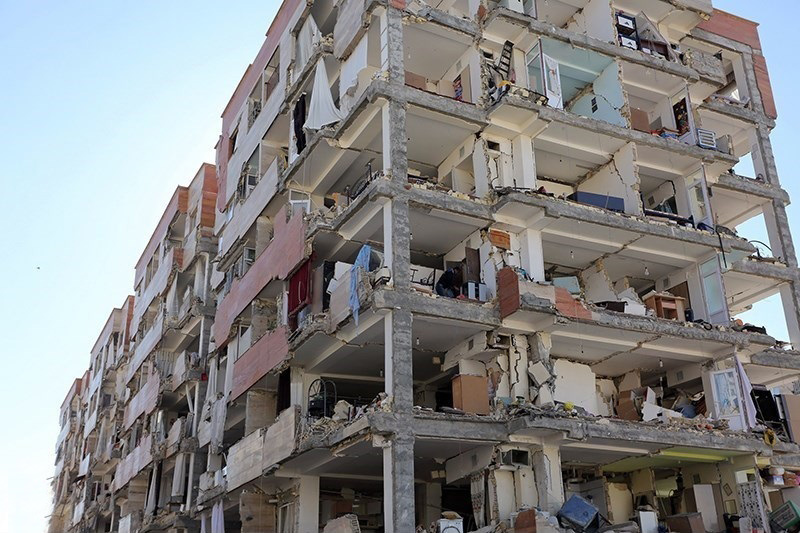
Damage to an apartment block in Sarpol-e Zahad

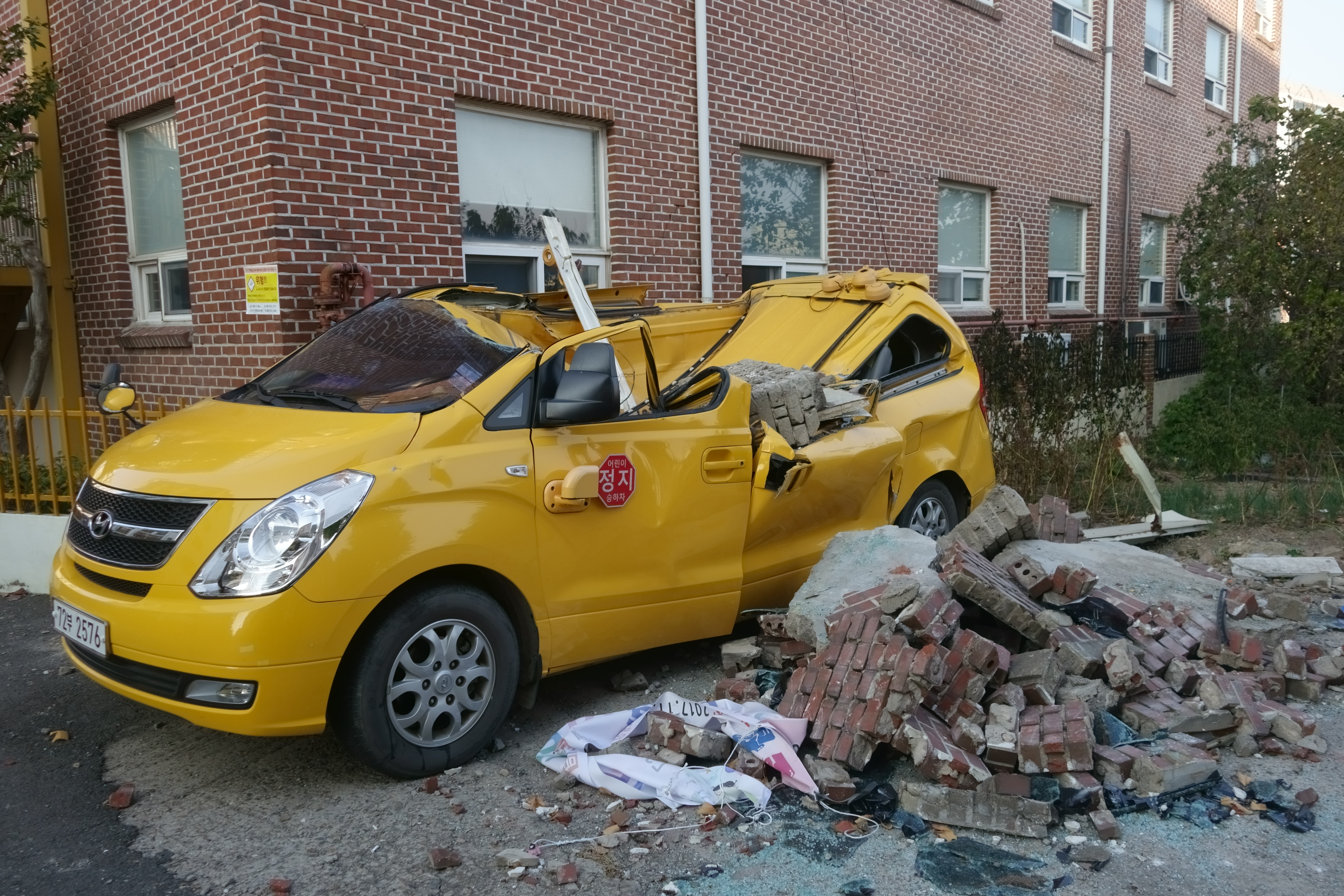
Debris falls on a vehicle after the earthquake in South Korea.

Date	Country and location	M_{w}	Depth (km)	MMI	Notes	Casualties	
Date	Country and location	M_{w}	Depth (km)	MMI	Notes	Dead	Injured
1	New Caledonia offshore, 110 km east of Tadine	6.1	11.0	IV	These were foreshocks of the 7.0 quake on November 19.		
1	New Caledonia offshore, 101 km east of Tadine	6.6	22.0	V			
4	Tonga offshore, 97 km northeast of Hihifo	6.8	10.0	V			
7	Papua New Guinea, 67 km west southwest of Angoram	6.5	110.6	V			
8	Indonesia, Bali, 17 km north northwest of Bedugul	4.9	22.7	V	Some buildings collapsed in Karangasem. One person was injured when a ceiling collapsed.		1
9	Japan offshore, 165 km east southeast of Hachijō-jima	6.0	12.0	III			
11	United Kingdom, Ascension Island offshore, 426 km south of Georgetown	6.1	10.0	II			
12	Iran, Kermanshah 29 km south of Halabja, Iraq	7.3	19.0	IX	The 2017 Iran–Iraq earthquake killed 630 people (620 in Iran and 10 in Iraq) and injured more than 8,400 others. Widespread damage in Kermanshah and Kurdistan region. Many buildings collapsed. This was the deadliest earthquake of 2017.	630	8,435
13	Costa Rica, 18 km west of Parrita	6.5	19.4	VIII	During the 2017 Costa Rica earthquake, buildings and supermarkets suffered damage in Jaco region. Three people died of a heart attack.	3	
15	South Korea, 7 km southwest of Pohang	5.5	10.0	VII	During the 2017 Pohang earthquake, the strongest earthquake in the country's modern history, 82 people were injured and more than 2,600 buildings were damaged.		82
15	Azerbaijan, 19 km east southeast of Barda	5.2	22.1	VI	More than 130 houses suffered damage in Barda raion. One person was injured.		1
17	Ecuador, 28 km south southeast of Guayaquil	5.4	78.1	V	Some buildings suffered damage in Guayas. Six people fainted. This earthquake occurred at the time of an earthquake simulation.		6
17	China, Tibet Autonomous Region, 156 km north northeast of Shi Yomi, India	6.4	8.0	VII	The quake caused power outages and damage in villages near Nyingchi and a road was blocked by a rockslide. Three people were injured.		3
18	Ecuador, 13 km east southeast of Balao	5.5	35.0	V	Some structural damage and walls collapsed in Balao.		
18	Indonesia, North Maluku, 82 km north of Tobelo	5.8	8.0	VI	294 houses and 12 churches suffered damage on Morotai Island. One person died.	1	
19	New Caledonia offshore, 82 km east of Tadine	6.3	14.0	V	It is a foreshock of the 7.0 quake.		
19	New Caledonia offshore, 74 km east of Tadine	6.6	13.0	V	It is another foreshock of the 7.0 quake.		
19	New Caledonia offshore, 85 km east northeast of Tadine	7.0	10.0	VI	A tsunami warning was issued for New Caledonia, with waves of 0.37 m reported in the Ouinné River.		
20	New Caledonia offshore, 96 km east of Tadine	6.0	10.0	IV	This was an aftershock of the 7.0 quake.		
20	Tonga offshore, 191 km northwest of Hihifo	6.0	9.0	IV			
23	China, Chongqing, 75 km east southeast of Fuling	5.1	10.0	VI	Around 1,000 homes were damaged, and eight people were injured in Wulong County.		8
23	Iran, 22 km south southwest of Borujerd	4.4	10.0	V	36 people were injured in a panic.		36
27	Papua New Guinea, 109 km east southeast of Kokopo	6.0	54.0	V			
30	Brazil offshore, 700 km east southeast of Saint Peter and Saint Paul Archipelago	6.5	10.0	I			
30	Democratic Republic of Congo, 16 km southwest of Kabare	5.0	10.0	III	Houses suffered damage in Walungu, and some collapsed.		

=== December ===
December
- Strongest: 6.5 M_{w} Bouvet Island, Norway; 6.5 M_{w} Indonesia
- Deadliest: 6.5 M_{w} Indonesia; 4 deaths
- Total fatalities: 7

Number by magnitude
- 8.0–8.9: 0
- 7.0–7.9: 0
- 6.0–6.9: 10
- 5.0–5.9: 100
- 4.0–4.9: 732

Date	Country and location	M_{w}	Depth (km)	MMI	Notes	Casualties	
Date	Country and location	M_{w}	Depth (km)	MMI	Notes	Dead	Injured
1	Iran, 55 km north northeast of Kerman	6.1	9.0	VII	Damage reported in several villages, and 51 people were injured.		51
1	Papua New Guinea, 51 km north northwest of Finschhafen	6.0	34.0	V			
3	Ecuador, 18 km northeast of Bahía de Caráquez	6.1	17.0	VII	Cracks on walls and power outages in Manabí Province. Two people were injured.		2
5	Iran, 99 km west northwest of Mohr	4.9	10.0	II	Some buildings were damaged and 11 people injured.		11
5	Iran, 5 km east southeast of Langarud	4.8	10.0	V	Partial damage to residential units in Gilan Province. Thirty people were injured.		30
5	Indonesia, Bengkulu Province, 56 km northwest of Curup	5.1	45.5	V	233 houses were damaged and 42 totally destroyed in Bengkulu Province. A nine-year-old boy was injured by a falling wall.		1
8	Micronesia offshore, 50 km northwest of Fais	6.4	12.8	V			
8	Micronesia offshore, 45 km northwest of Fais	6.3	8.0	rowspan=2|These were aftershocks of the 6.4 quake.			
9	Micronesia offshore, 50 km northwest of Fais	6.1	10.0	V			
11	Iraq, 23 km west southwest of Halabja	5.4	17.6	VI	Several houses collapsed in Sulaimani province and 50 people were hospitalized, nine of them with injuries. This was an aftershock of the 7.3 quake on November 12.		50
12	Iran, 53 km north northeast of Kerman	6.0	12.0	VII	Some damage at least 29 people were injured. This was an aftershock of the 6.1 quake on December 1.		29
12	Iran, 63 km north northeast of Kerman	6.0	8.0	VII	Additional damage occurred and 58 people were injured. This was an aftershock of the 6.1 quake on December 1.		58
13	Norway offshore, 80 km west northwest of Bouvet Island	6.5	17.0	V			
15	Indonesia, West Java, 12 km south southwest of Kawalu	6.5	90.0	VII	During the 2017 Java earthquake, four people were killed and 36 others injured; 2935 houses and buildings collapsed or suffered damage in West and Central Java.	4	36
20	Iran, 2 km southwest of Malard	4.9	10.0	V	Power outages and disruptions to communications and the internet in some towns of Tehran Province. Buildings in the village of Akhtar Abad sustained damage. Two people died and 97 others were injured.	2	97
21	Iran, 30 km north northwest of Shahrak-e Pabedana	5.2	10.0	III	300 houses were destroyed and 42 people slightly injured. This was an aftershock of the 6.1 quake on December 1.		42
26	Iran, 15 km west of Tehran	4.0	10.0	IV	One person died of a heart attack and 75 others were injured during panic movements. It was an aftershock of the 4.9 quake on December 20.	1	75
28	United States, Oklahoma, 3 km north northeast of Dale	3.7	5.1	IV	At least one house was damaged in McLoud.		
