= 2017 Philippines earthquake =

The 2017 Philippines earthquake may refer to:

- 2017 Surigao earthquake - M_{w} 6.5 earthquake near Surigao City, at least 8 dead
- 2017 Batangas earthquakes - Earthquake swarm, largest is M_{s} 6.0, 6 injured
- 2017 Leyte earthquake - M_{s} 6.5 earthquake in Leyte, 4 killed, 100+ injured

== See also ==
- List of earthquakes in 2017
- List of earthquakes in the Philippines
