= Karak, Hamadan =

Karak كرك
- Village
- Location within Iran
- Coordinates: 34°03′36″N 48°27′24″E
- Country: Iran
- Province: Hamadan
- County: Nahavand
- Bakhsh: Central
- Rural District: Gamasiyab

Population (2006)
  - Total: 294
- Time zone: UTC+3:30 (IRST)
  - Summer (DST): UTC+4:30 (IRDT)

Karak (Persian: كرك; also known as Garak, Garrak, and Gorg) is a village in Gamasiyab Rural District, in the Central District of Nahavand County, Hamadan Province, Iran. At the 2006 census, its population was 294, in 65 families.
