= Do Cheshmeh =

Do Cheshmeh (Persian: دوچشمه) may refer to:

- Do Cheshmeh, Hamadan
- Do Cheshmeh, Kermanshah
