= Qaleh-ye Qobad =

Qaleh-ye Qobad or Qaleh Qobad (Persian: قلعه قباد) may refer to:

- Qaleh-ye Qobad, Hamadan
- Qaleh-ye Qobad, Kermanshah
