= Kafraj =

Kafraj or Kefraj (Persian: كفراج) may refer to:

- Kafraj, Hamadan
- Kafraj, Lorestan
