= Sadeqabad-e Qapanuri =

Sadeqabad-e Qapanuri صادق ابادقپانوري
- Village
- Location within Iran
- Coordinates: 34°13′51″N 48°17′24″E
- Country: Iran
- Province: Hamadan
- County: Nahavand
- Bakhsh: Central
- Rural District: Tariq ol Eslam

Population (2006)
  - Total: 594
- Time zone: UTC+3:30 (IRST)
  - Summer (DST): UTC+4:30 (IRDT)

Sadeqabad-e Qapanuri (Persian: صادق ابادقپانوري, also Romanized as Şādeqābād-e Qapānūrī; also known as Chūlak-e Şādeqābād) is a village in Tariq ol Eslam Rural District, in the Central District of Nahavand County, Hamadan Province, Iran. At the 2006 census, its population was 594, in 164 families.
