= Deh-e Heydar, Hamadan =

Village in Hamadan province, Iran

Deh-e Heydar Persian: ده حيدر
- Village
- Location within Iran
- Coordinates: 34°04′31″N 48°24′47″E
- Country: Iran
- Province: Hamadan
- County: Nahavand
- District: Central
- Rural District: Gamasiyab

Population (2016)
  - Total: 823
- Time zone: UTC+3:30 (IRST)

Deh-e Heydar (Persian: ده حيدر) (Note: Also romanized as Deh Heidar, Deh Ḩeydar, and Deh-e Ḩeydar) is a village in Gamasiyab Rural District of the Central District in Nahavand County, Hamadan province, Iran.

== Demographics ==
=== Population ===
At the time of the 2006 National Census, the village's population was 674 in 181 households. The following census in 2011 counted 755 people in 249 households. The 2016 census measured the population of the village as 823 people in 250 households.
