= Bian, Hamadan =

Village in Hamadan province, Iran

Bian Persian: بيان
- Village
- Location within Iran
- Coordinates: 34°05′52″N 48°24′49″E
- Country: Iran
- Province: Hamadan
- County: Nahavand
- District: Central
- Rural District: Gamasiyab

Population (2016)
  - Total: 1,349
- Time zone: UTC+3:30 (IRST)

Bian (Persian: بيان) (Note: Also romanized as Bīān; also known as Bayān) is a village in Gamasiyab Rural District of the Central District in Nahavand County, Hamadan province, Iran.

== Demographics ==
=== Population ===
At the time of the 2006 National Census, the village's population was 1,479 in 413 households. The following census in 2011 counted 1,545 people in 466 households. The 2016 census measured the population of the village as 1,349 people in 448 households.
