= Dehqanabad-e Chulak =

Village in Hamadan province, Iran

Dehqanabad-e Chulak Persian: دهقان ابادچولك
- Village
- Location within Iran
- Coordinates: 34°15′16″N 48°17′30″E
- Country: Iran
- Province: Hamadan
- County: Nahavand
- District: Central
- Rural District: Tariq ol Eslam

Population (2016)
  - Total: 599
- Time zone: UTC+3:30 (IRST)

Dehqanabad-e Chulak (Persian: دهقان ابادچولك) (Note: Also romanized as Dehqānābād-e Chūlak; also known as Dehqānābād) is a village in Tariq ol Eslam Rural District of the Central District in Nahavand County, Hamadan province, Iran.

== Demographics ==
=== Population ===
At the time of the 2006 National Census, the village's population was 508 in 130 households. The following census in 2011 counted 568 people in 170 households. The 2016 census measured the population of the village as 599 people in 178 households.
