= Chulak Qapanuri =

Chulak Qapanuri چولك قپانوري
- Village
- Location within Iran
- Coordinates: 34°14′05″N 48°18′00″E
- Country: Iran
- Province: Hamadan
- County: Nahavand
- Bakhsh: Central
- Rural District: Tariq ol Eslam

Population (2006)
  - Total: 456
- Time zone: UTC+3:30 (IRST)
  - Summer (DST): UTC+4:30 (IRDT)

Chulak Qapanuri (Persian: چولك قپانوري, also Romanized as Chūlak Qapānūrī; also known as Chūlak and Chūlak-e Qabānūrī) is a village in Tariq ol Eslam Rural District, in the Central District of Nahavand County, Hamadan Province, Iran. At the 2006 census, its population was 456, in 132 families.
