= Deh Bureh, Nahavand =

Village in Hamadan province, Iran

Deh Bureh Persian: ده بوره
- Village
- Location within Iran
- Coordinates: 34°12′16″N 48°19′34″E
- Country: Iran
- Province: Hamadan
- County: Nahavand
- District: Central
- Rural District: Tariq ol Eslam

Population (2016)
  - Total: 750
- Time zone: UTC+3:30 (IRST)

Deh Bureh (Persian: ده بوره) (Note: Also romanized as Deh Būreh; also known as Deh Būt) is a village in Tariq ol Eslam Rural District of the Central District in Nahavand County, Hamadan province, Iran.

== Demographics ==
=== Population ===
At the time of the 2006 National Census, the village's population was 807 in 207 households. The following census in 2011 counted 777 people in 246 households. The 2016 census measured the population of the village as 750 people in 233 households.
