= 2017 Botswana earthquake =

- Location within Botswana Location within Africa
- UTC time: 2017-04-03 17:40:18
- ISC event: 610478084
- USGS-ANSS: ComCat
- Local date: 3 April 2017
- Local time: 19:40:18 CAT
- Magnitude: 6.5 M_{w}
- Depth: 29 km (18 mi)
- Epicenter: 22.658°S 25.147°E
- Areas affected: Central District, Botswana
- Max. intensity: MMI VIII (Severe)
- Casualties: 36 injured

A magnitude 6.5 earthquake struck the Central District of Botswana on 3 April 2017 at 17:40:18 UTC, or 19:40:18 local time. It is the second largest earthquake recorded in Botswana, after the magnitude 6.7 Maun earthquake in 1952.

== Earthquake ==
The earthquake struck at 19:40 local time according to the US Geological Survey. It was felt for 30 seconds in the country's capital of Gaborone and was reportedly felt in neighboring South Africa, Zimbabwe, and Swaziland. At least 36 students were injured in a stampede sparked by the earthquake.

== Geology ==
The epicenter area of the earthquake is covered by wind-blown sediments and there is no trace of a fault at the surface prior to the earthquake. The phenomenon was suspected to be an artificial earthquake allegedly caused by hydraulic fracking activity in the Central Kalahari Game Reserve. This speculation has been dismissed by the Botswana Geoscience Institute saying that the earthquake was natural, taking note that the earthquake was recorded at a depth of 29 km (18 mi). Geophysical investigation of the epicenter region show that the earthquake is natural, related to deep mantle fluids moving up the crust and causing the extensional reactivation of an ancient thrust fault. Slip along a low-angle segment of the fault caused a slight ground deformation at the surface detectable only by satellite radar technology.

== See also ==
- List of earthquakes in 2017
- Geology of Botswana
