= Varayeneh =

Village in Hamadan province, Iran

Varayeneh Persian: وراينه
- Village
- Location within Iran
- Coordinates: 34°04′43″N 48°24′14″E
- Country: Iran
- Province: Hamadan
- County: Nahavand
- District: Central
- Rural District: Gamasiyab

Population (2016)
  - Total: 1,719
- Time zone: UTC+3:30 (IRST)

Varayeneh (Persian: وراينه) (Note: Also romanized as Var Āyneh, Varā’īneh, Varāyeneh, and Varāyneh; also known as Āyeneh, Varāmīneh, Varavīna, Varvenī, and Waraweni) is a village in Gamasiyab Rural District of the Central District in Nahavand County, Hamadan province, Iran.

== Demographics ==
=== Population ===
At the time of the 2006 National Census, the village's population was 1,557 in 391 households. The following census in 2011 counted 1,614 people in 503 households. The 2016 census measured the population of the village as 1,719 people in 509 households, the most populous in its rural district.
