= Gusheh-ye Badi ol Zaman =

Gusheh-ye Badi ol Zaman گوشه بديع الزمان
- Village
- Location within Iran
- Coordinates: 34°06′10″N 48°29′55″E
- Country: Iran
- Province: Hamadan
- County: Nahavand
- Bakhsh: Central
- Rural District: Gamasiyab

Population (2006)
  - Total: 452
- Time zone: UTC+3:30 (IRST)
  - Summer (DST): UTC+4:30 (IRDT)

Gusheh-ye Badi ol Zaman (Persian: گوشه بديع الزمان, also Romanized as Gūsheh-ye Badī‘ ol Zamān; also known as Badī‘ oz Zamān, Gusa, Gūseh, and Gūsheh-ye Sālārābād) is a village in Gamasiyab Rural District, in the Central District of Nahavand County, Hamadan Province, Iran. At the 2006 census, its population was 452, in 136 families.
