= Sefid Khaneh =

Village in Hamadan province, Iran

Sefid Khaneh Persian: سفيدخانه
- Village
- Location within Iran
- Coordinates: 34°04′14″N 48°30′29″E
- Country: Iran
- Province: Hamadan
- County: Nahavand
- District: Central
- Rural District: Gamasiyab

Population (2016)
  - Total: 729
- Time zone: UTC+3:30 (IRST)

Sefid Khaneh (Persian: سفيدخانه) (Note: Also romanized as Sefīd Khāneh; also known as Isbīkhāni, Safīd Khānī, Safīd Kohni, and Sefīd Khānī) is a village in Gamasiyab Rural District of the Central District in Nahavand County, Hamadan province, Iran.

== Demographics ==
=== Population ===
At the time of the 2006 National Census, the village's population was 747 in 207 households. The following census in 2011 counted 845 people in 250 households. The 2016 census measured the population of the village as 729 people in 224 households.
