= 2017 Komandorski Islands earthquake =

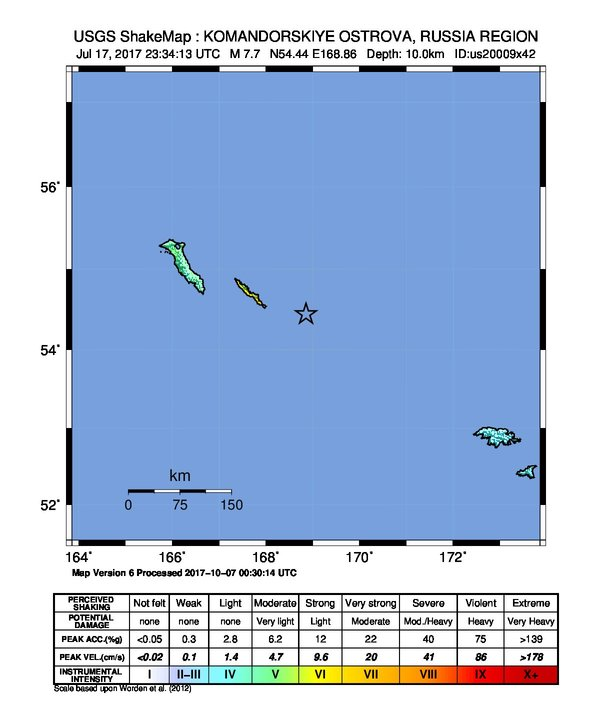

- Location within Kamchatka Krai
- UTC time: 2017-07-17 23:34:13
- ISC event: 610785483
- USGS-ANSS: ComCat
- Local date: July 18, 2017
- Local time: 11:34:13
- Duration: > 80 seconds
- Magnitude: 7.8 M_{w}
- Depth: 8.4 km
- Epicenter: 54.443°N 168.857°E
- Fault: Bering Fracture Zone
- Type: Strike-slip (Dextral)
- Areas affected: Russia
- Total damage: None
- Max. intensity: MMI VII (Very strong)
- Tsunami: 0.3 ft
- Foreshocks: Yes
- Aftershocks: Yes

On July 18, 2017, an earthquake struck near the Komandorski Islands, east of the Kamchatka Peninsula in the Bering Sea at 11:34 local time (23:34 UTC on July 17). Although there were no casualties from this earthquake, it was notable for a rare characteristic known as supershear, and is one of the few times a large supershear earthquake has been observed. It was preceded by a few foreshocks months earlier, and aftershocks that continued for nearly six months.

== Tectonic setting ==
The M_{w} 7.8 earthquake nucleated along the Bering fracture zone, parallel to the Aleutian Islands arc and Aleutian Subduction Zone. This is a transform fault between the Pacific and North American plates, and in between, the Komandorski Sliver. Formed from the highly oblique movement of the Pacific plate, the direction of convergence is nearly parallel to the trench at 7.8 mm/yr. The Bearing Fracture Zone acts as a back-arc fault to accommodate the lateral motion at a rate of 5.1 mm/yr. The same fracture zone may have produced a similar sized earthquake in 1929 close to the Near Islands of Alaska. Energy released from this earthquake was sufficient to accommodate strain built-up since the last earthquake on that section of fault in 1858.

== Earthquake ==
Initially registering a magnitude 7.4, the earthquake was quickly revised to a 7.7 by the US Geological Survey. No loss of life or property damage was reported following the earthquake due to the remoteness of the event, although it could be felt by people. Shaking intensities V to VI was felt at Bering Island, and in Petropavlovsk-Kamchatsky, was felt as II. Tsunami warning was issued but cancelled a few less than two hours later. A non-destructive tsunami of 0.3 feet was observed. The small tsunami was attributed to the lack of vertical displacement during the event.

The earthquake focal mechanism was almost pure strike-slip, and the entire rupture process took more than 80 seconds. Displacements of 4 to 8.5 meters along the upper 15 km of the crust, with evidence of extension at 20 to 30 km depth. Evidence of supershear was discovered when researchers realized that rupture velocity of this event increased from 2.1 km/s to 5.0 km/s after the rupture jumped onto another segment at a step-over. The rupture speed far exceeded the shear wave velocity. Its rupture length of 400 km is also one of the longest in the world for a strike-slip fault, comparable to the 1906 San Francisco and 2001 Kokoxili earthquake.

== Foreshocks and aftershocks ==
A magnitude 6.7 earthquake occurred close to Attu Station, Alaska on 2 June, and a 6.3 thirteen hours before that. The 2 June 6.3 event had a foreshock of its own on 27 March.

Nearly all of the aftershocks from this earthquake were relatively small, mostly in the M4.0s range, which meant that the initial quake had released most of the strain that had been building-up. The largest aftershock was an M 6.2 on January 25, 2018. On December 12, a 7.3 struck near the Kamchatka Peninsula with strike-slip mechanism was not part of the aftershock sequence, but was likely triggered by stress transfer from the July 17 quake.

== See also ==
- List of earthquakes in 2017
- List of earthquakes in Russia
