= Gusheh-ye Sad-e Vaqas =

Village in Hamadan province, Iran

Gusheh-ye Sad-e Vaqas Persian: گوشه سعدوقاص
- Village
- Location within Iran
- Coordinates: 34°17′17″N 48°15′05″E
- Country: Iran
- Province: Hamadan
- County: Nahavand
- District: Central
- Rural District: Tariq ol Eslam

Population (2016)
  - Total: 663
- Time zone: UTC+3:30 (IRST)

Gusheh-ye Sad-e Vaqas (Persian: گوشه سعدوقاص) (Note: Also romanized as Gūsheh Sa‘d-e Vaqqāş and Gūsheh-ye Sa‘d-e Vaqāş; also known as Gūsheh) is a village in Tariq ol Eslam Rural District of the Central District in Nahavand County, Hamadan province, Iran.

== Demographics ==
=== Population ===
At the time of the 2006 National Census, the village's population was 653 in 171 households. The following census in 2011 counted 644 people in 201 households. The 2016 census measured the population of the village as 663 people in 210 households.
