= Baba Qasem =

Village in Hamadan province, Iran

Baba Qasem Persian: باباقاسم
- Village
- Location within Iran
- Coordinates: 34°04′48″N 48°26′55″E
- Country: Iran
- Province: Hamadan
- County: Nahavand
- District: Central
- Rural District: Gamasiyab

Population (2016)
  - Total: 1,652
- Time zone: UTC+3:30 (IRST)

Baba Qasem (Persian: باباقاسم) (Note: Also romanized as Bābā Qāsem; also known as Bāba Gūsam) is a village in, and the capital of, Gamasiyab Rural District in the Central District of Nahavand County, Hamadan province, Iran.

== Demographics ==
=== Population ===
At the time of the 2006 National Census, the village's population was 1,723 in 443 households. The following census in 2011 counted 1,835 people in 538 households. The 2016 census measured the population of the village as 1,652 people in 514 households.
