= Sohran, Hamadan =

Village in Hamadan province, Iran

Sohran Persian: سهران
- Village
- Location within Iran
- Coordinates: 34°02′07″N 48°28′54″E
- Country: Iran
- Province: Hamadan
- County: Nahavand
- District: Central
- Rural District: Gamasiyab

Population (2016)
  - Total: 903
- Time zone: UTC+3:30 (IRST)

Sohran (Persian: سهران) (Note: Also romanized as Sahran and Sohrān) is a village in Gamasiyab Rural District of the Central District in Nahavand County, Hamadan province, Iran.

== Demographics ==
=== Population ===
At the time of the 2006 National Census, the village's population was 852 in 213 households. The following census in 2011 counted 936 people in 254 households. The 2016 census measured the population of the village as 903 people in 267 households.
