= Tayemeh, Nahavand =

Village in Hamadan province, Iran

Tayemeh Persian: طايمه
- Village
- Location within Iran
- Coordinates: 34°19′10″N 48°16′38″E
- Country: Iran
- Province: Hamadan
- County: Nahavand
- District: Central
- Rural District: Tariq ol Eslam

Population (2016)
  - Total: 651
- Time zone: UTC+3:30 (IRST)

Tayemeh (Persian: طايمه) (Note: Also romanized as Ţā’emeh, Ţāīmeh, and Ţāyemeh; also known as Somāq and Thaimāq) is a village in Tariq ol Eslam Rural District of the Central District in Nahavand County, Hamadan province, Iran.

== Demographics ==
=== Population ===
At the time of the 2006 National Census, the village's population was 673 in 162 households. The following census in 2011 counted 660 people in 192 households. The 2016 census measured the population of the village as 651 people in 205 households.
