= Deh Ful =

Village in Hamadan province, Iran

Deh Ful Persian: ده فول
- Village
- Location within Iran
- Coordinates: 34°13′38″N 48°18′55″E
- Country: Iran
- Province: Hamadan
- County: Nahavand
- District: Central
- Rural District: Tariq ol Eslam

Population (2016)
  - Total: 2,416
- Time zone: UTC+3:30 (IRST)

Deh Ful (Persian: ده فول) (Note: Also romanized as Deh Fūl and Dehfūl) is a village in, and the capital of, Tariq ol Eslam Rural District in the Central District of Nahavand County, Hamadan province, Iran.

== Demographics ==
=== Population ===
At the time of the 2006 National Census, the village's population was 2,582 in 737 households. The following census in 2011 counted 2,411 people in 796 households. The 2016 census measured the population of the village as 2,416 people in 802 households, the most populous in its rural district.
