= GUSA =

GUSA may refer to:

- Georgetown University Student Association, a student representative organisation at Georgetown University in Washington, D.C.
- Glasgow University Sports Association, a student sport organisation at the University of Glasgow, United Kingdom
- Sangarédi Airport, Guinea (by ICAO code)

== See also ==
- Gusa
