= Gamasb =

Village in Hamadan province, Iran

Gamasb Persian: گاماسب
- Village
- Location within Iran
- Coordinates: 34°02′16″N 48°27′42″E
- Country: Iran
- Province: Hamadan
- County: Nahavand
- District: Central
- Rural District: Gamasiyab

Population (2016)
  - Total: 628
- Time zone: UTC+3:30 (IRST)

Gamasb (Persian: گاماسب) (Note: Also romanized as Gāmāsb; also known as Fāmāst, Gāmāsp, and Pamas) is a village in Gamasiyab Rural District of the Central District in Nahavand County, Hamadan province, Iran.

== Demographics ==
=== Population ===
At the time of the 2006 National Census, the village's population was 1,028 in 231 households. The following census in 2011 counted 824 people in 229 households. The 2016 census measured the population of the village as 628 people in 199 households.

== Gallery ==
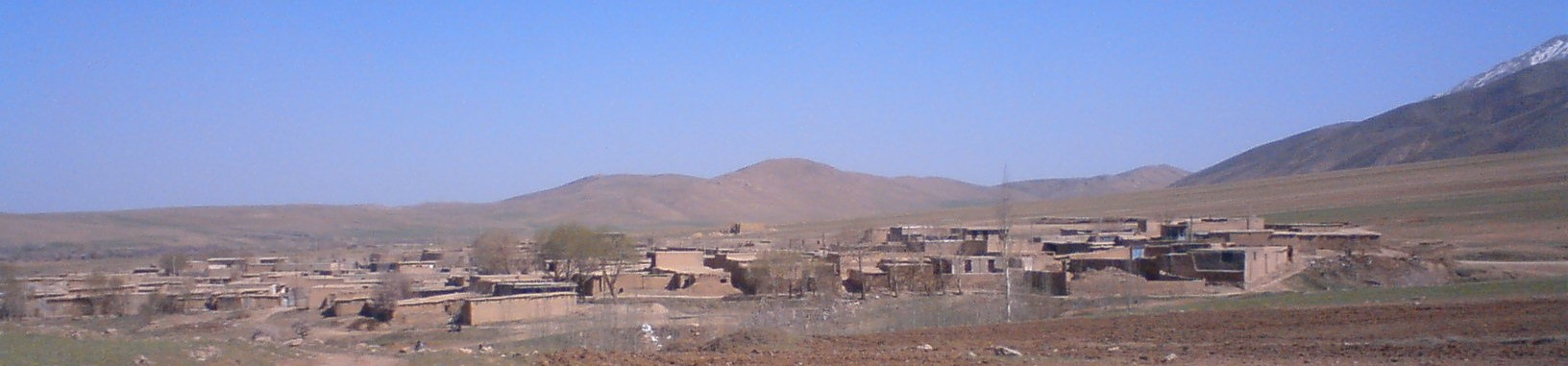
Panoramic view from the square
