= Qaleh-ye Qobad, Hamadan =

Village in Hamadan province, Iran

Qaleh-ye Qobad Persian: قلعه قباد
- Village
- Location within Iran
- Coordinates: 34°06′05″N 48°25′33″E
- Country: Iran
- Province: Hamadan
- County: Nahavand
- District: Central
- Rural District: Gamasiyab

Population (2016)
  - Total: 822
- Time zone: UTC+3:30 (IRST)

Qaleh-ye Qobad (Persian: قلعه قباد) (Note: Also romanized as Qal‘eh-ye Qobād; also known as Ghal’eh Ghobad) is a village in Gamasiyab Rural District of the Central District in Nahavand County, Hamadan province, Iran.

== Demographics ==
=== Population ===
At the time of the 2006 National Census, the village's population was 1,026 in 288 households. The following census in 2011 counted 999 people in 309 households. The 2016 census measured the population of the village as 822 people in 272 households.
