= 2017 Papua New Guinea earthquake =

Earthquake affecting Papua New Guinea

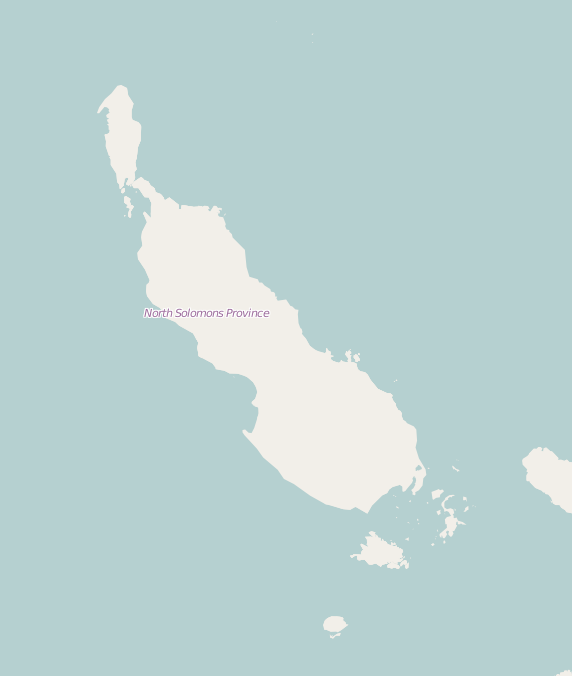
- Location within Bougainville Island
- UTC time: 2017-01-22 04:30:22
- ISC event: 611831635
- USGS-ANSS: ComCat
- Local date: 22 January 2017
- Local time: 15:30:22 BST
- Magnitude: 7.9 M_{w}
- Depth: 135 km (84 mi)
- Epicenter: 6.246°S 155.172°E
- Areas affected: Papua New Guinea Solomon Islands
- Max. intensity: MMI IX (Violent)
- Casualties: 5 dead, 18 injured

The 2017 Papua New Guinea earthquake was an M_{ww} 7.9 earthquake that struck at 04:30 UTC on 22 January 2017.

== Impact ==
=== Damage ===
Damage occurred in Arawa and parts of central Bougainville, while a power outage occurred in Buka.

=== Casualties ===
Two children were killed and another was injured from a landslide, and a 7-year-old girl died after she was hit by falling rocks. Another landslide killed two teenagers as well. Fifteen children were injured by falling trees and rocks, while two men were slightly injured by a landslide in Panguna.

== See also ==
- List of earthquakes in 2017
- List of earthquakes in Papua New Guinea
- 2016 Solomon Islands earthquakes
