= Do Cheshmeh, Hamadan =

Village in Hamadan province, Iran

Do Cheshmeh Persian: دوچشمه
- Village
- Location within Iran
- Coordinates: 34°13′33″N 48°21′51″E
- Country: Iran
- Province: Hamadan
- County: Nahavand
- District: Central
- Rural District: Tariq ol Eslam

Population (2016)
  - Total: 1,532
- Time zone: UTC+3:30 (IRST)

Do Cheshmeh (Persian: دوچشمه) (Note: Formerly known as Kaleh Khān (کله خان), also romanized as Kalleh Khān; also known as Kela Khān and Qal‘eh Khān) is a village in Tariq ol Eslam Rural District of the Central District in Nahavand County, Hamadan province, Iran.

== Demographics ==
=== Population ===
At the time of the 2006 National Census, the village's population was 710 in 169 households. The following census in 2011 counted 1,152 people in 312 households. The 2016 census measured the population of the village as 1,532 people in 431 households.
