= 2017 Jinghe earthquake =

Earthquake in Xinjiang, China

2017 Jinghe earthquake 2017年精河地震
- Location within Dzungaria
- UTC time: 2017-08-08 23:27:53
- ISC event: 610874246
- USGS-ANSS: ComCat
- Local date: 9 August 2017 CST (UTC+8)
- Local time: 07:27 CST
- Magnitude: 6.6 (CENC) 6.3 M_{w} (USGS)
- Depth: 11 kilometres (CENC) 20.0 kilometres (USGS)
- Epicenter: 44.27°N 82.89°E (CENC); 44.306°N 82.836°E (USGS); Jinghe County, Bortala Mongol Autonomous Prefecture, Xinjiang Uyghur Autonomous Region, China
- Areas affected: most part in Xinjiang Uyghur Autonomous Region, China
- Total damage: 142 buildings were collapsed and 1060 buildings were damaged
- Max. intensity: MMI VII (Very strong)
- Aftershocks: 108+, including 20 major aftershocks
- Casualties: 32 injured (2 serious)

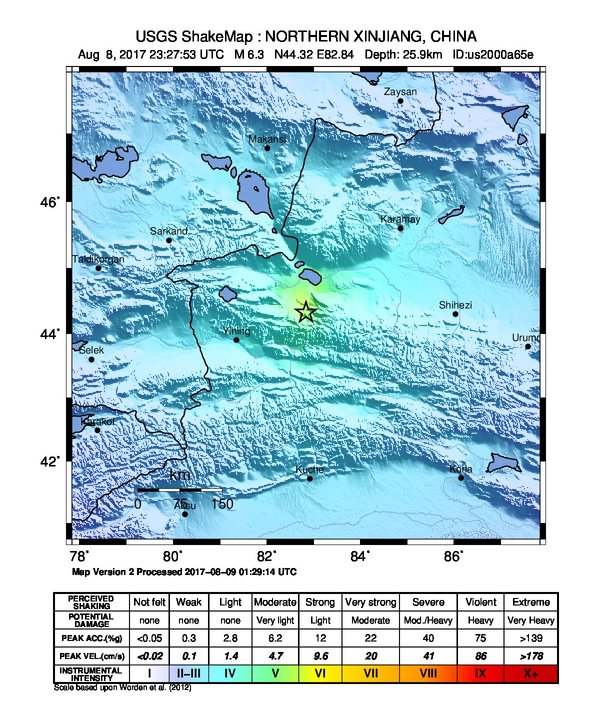
The distribution of the seismic intensity of this earthquake, where the epicentre is labelled with a star (USGS)

The 2017 Jinghe earthquake occurred at 07:27 China Standard Time (CST, UTC+8) on 9 August 2017, in Jinghe County, Bortala Mongol Autonomous Prefecture, Xinjiang Uyghur Autonomous Region, China, with magnitude 6.6 and depth 11 kilometres. The epicentre was 44.27°N 82.89°E. Most cities in northern Xinjiang felt the quake. This earthquake occurred on the Tian Shan seismic zone. There was no direct relationship to the earthquake in Jiuzhaigou County that occurred the previous day.

== Casualties and damage ==
Until 11:00 CST (UTC+8) on 9 August 2017, this earthquake caused 32 people injured, including 2 critical injuries, and 142 buildings were collapsed and 1060 buildings were damaged. A wall at the Gezhou 110kv Substation in Bajiahu Village fell, but the power supply was still normal.

== Aftershocks ==
Until 12:00 CST (UTC+8) on 9 August 2017, there occurred 108 aftershocks. Until 15:00 CST (UTC+8) on 10 August 2017, there occurred 18 major aftershocks that reached a magnitude of 3.0, six of which reached a magnitude of 4.0. The major aftershock reported by China Earthquake Networks Center are listed below:

#	CST date and time	Epicentre		Depth	magnitude	Sources
#	CST date and time	Coordinate	Place	Depth	magnitude	Sources
Main	2017-08-09 07:27:52	44.27°N 82.89°E	Jinghe County, Bortala Mongol Autonomous Prefecture, Xinjiang Uyghur Autonomous Region, China	11 kilometres	6.6	
1	2017-08-09 07:31:06	44.28°N 82.82°E	Jinghe County, Bortala Mongol Autonomous Prefecture, Xinjiang Uyghur Autonomous Region, China	6 kilometres	4.0	
2	2017-08-09 07:32:51	44.29°N 82.74°E	Jinghe County, Bortala Mongol Autonomous Prefecture, Xinjiang Uyghur Autonomous Region, China	12 kilometres	4.0	
3	2017-08-09 07:35:02	44.33°N 82.90°E	Jinghe County, Bortala Mongol Autonomous Prefecture, Xinjiang Uyghur Autonomous Region, China	8 kilometres	3.2	
4	2017-08-09 07:36:27	44.29°N 82.75°E	Jinghe County, Bortala Mongol Autonomous Prefecture, Xinjiang Uyghur Autonomous Region, China	13 kilometres	3.3	
5	2017-08-09 07:39:18	44.29°N 82.75°E	Jinghe County, Bortala Mongol Autonomous Prefecture, Xinjiang Uyghur Autonomous Region, China	7 kilometres	4.5	
6	2017-08-09 07:44:31	44.31°N 82.76°E	Jinghe County, Bortala Mongol Autonomous Prefecture, Xinjiang Uyghur Autonomous Region, China	8 kilometres	4.7	
7	2017-08-09 08:22:37	44.30°N 82.71°E	Jinghe County, Bortala Mongol Autonomous Prefecture, Xinjiang Uyghur Autonomous Region, China	6 kilometres	4.0	
8	2017-08-09 08:27:26	44.28°N 82.70°E	Jinghe County, Bortala Mongol Autonomous Prefecture, Xinjiang Uyghur Autonomous Region, China	5 kilometres	3.1	
9	2017-08-09 08:40:23	44.29°N 82.59°E	Jinghe County, Bortala Mongol Autonomous Prefecture, Xinjiang Uyghur Autonomous Region, China	14 kilometres	3.7	
10	2017-08-09 08:51:02	44.29°N 82.74°E	Jinghe County, Bortala Mongol Autonomous Prefecture, Xinjiang Uyghur Autonomous Region, China	12 kilometres	3.0	
11	2017-08-09 08:52:34	44.29°N 82.70°E	Jinghe County, Bortala Mongol Autonomous Prefecture, Xinjiang Uyghur Autonomous Region, China	5 kilometres	3.1	
12	2017-08-09 08:54:32	44.28°N 82.69°E	Jinghe County, Bortala Mongol Autonomous Prefecture, Xinjiang Uyghur Autonomous Region, China	12 kilometres	3.1	
13	2017-08-09 13:22:40	44.29°N 82.78°E	Jinghe County, Bortala Mongol Autonomous Prefecture, Xinjiang Uyghur Autonomous Region, China	8 kilometres	4.6	
14	2017-08-09 13:30:01	44.10°N 82.07°E	Nilka County, Ili Kazakh Autonomous Prefecture, Xinjiang Uyghur Autonomous Region, China	7 kilometres	3.0	
15	2017-08-09 18:02:09	44.31°N 82.85°E	Jinghe County, Bortala Mongol Autonomous Prefecture, Xinjiang Uyghur Autonomous Region, China	7 kilometres	3.2	
16	2017-08-09 23:47:52	44.33°N 82.79°E	Jinghe County, Bortala Mongol Autonomous Prefecture, Xinjiang Uyghur Autonomous Region, China	7 kilometres	3.3	
17	2017-08-10 01:14:12	44.28°N 82.73°E	Jinghe County, Bortala Mongol Autonomous Prefecture, Xinjiang Uyghur Autonomous Region, China	7 kilometres	3.3	
18	2017-08-10 08:10:22	44.26°N 82.71°E	Jinghe County, Bortala Mongol Autonomous Prefecture, Xinjiang Uyghur Autonomous Region, China	8 kilometres	3.3	
19	2017-08-12 06:19:06	44.28°N 82.71°E	Jinghe County, Bortala Mongol Autonomous Prefecture, Xinjiang Uyghur Autonomous Region, China	16 kilometres	3.3	
20	2017-08-13 15:41:49	44.30°N 82.85°E	Jinghe County, Bortala Mongol Autonomous Prefecture, Xinjiang Uyghur Autonomous Region, China	8 kilometres	3.0	

== See also ==
- List of earthquakes in 2017
- List of earthquakes in China
