= 2017 Iran–Iraq earthquake =

Fatal 7.3 Mw earthquake near the Iran–Iraq border

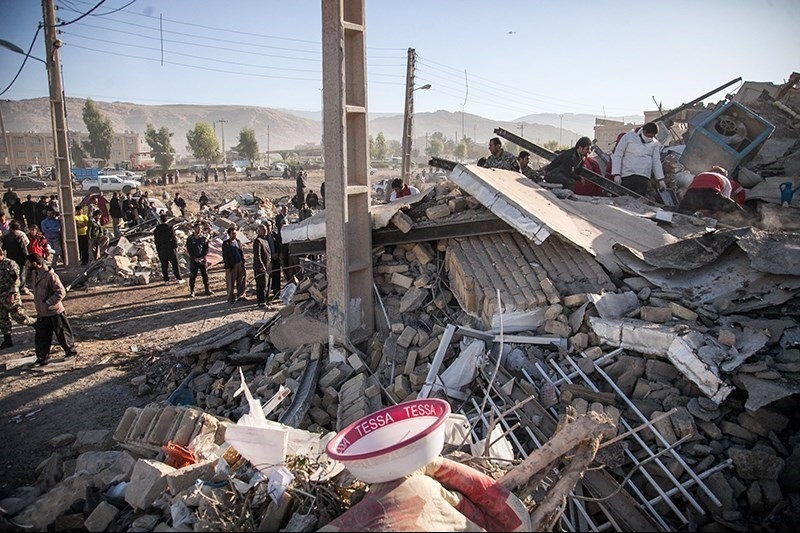
- Damage in Kermanshah.

- Location within Iran
- UTC time: 2017-11-12 18:18:17
- ISC event: 617943542
- USGS-ANSS: ComCat
- Local date: 12 November 2017
- Local time: 21:48 IRST
- Magnitude: M_{w} 7.4
- Depth: 19.0 km (12 mi)
- Epicenter: 34.905°N 45.956°E
- Fault: Zagros fold and thrust belt
- Type: Thrust
- Areas affected: Iran; Iraq
- Max. intensity: MMI IX (Violent)
- Landslides: Yes
- Casualties: 630 dead 8,100+ injured 70,000+ homeless

On 12 November 2017 at 18:18 UTC (21:48 Iran Standard Time, 21:18 Arabia Standard Time), an earthquake with a moment magnitude of 7.4 occurred on the Iran–Iraq border, with the Iraqi Kurdish city of Halabja, and the Kurdish dominated places of Ezgeleh, Salas-e Babajani County, Kermanshah province in Iran, closest to the epicentre, 30 kilometres (19 mi) south of the city of Halabja, Iraqi Kurdistan.

It was felt as far away as Israel and the United Arab Emirates. With at least 630 people killed (mostly in Iraq's Kurdish Halabja area and the Iranian Kurdish dominated province of Kermanshah), more than 8,100 injured, and many more unaccounted for, it was the deadliest earthquake of 2017.

== Tectonic setting ==
The earthquake was located within the Zagros fold and thrust belt, part of the broad and complex zone of continental collision between the Arabian and Eurasian plates. At this location, the relative convergence of the plates is about 26 mm per year. The convergence is quite oblique to the Zagros belt, although it is partitioned into orthogonal dip-slip motion within the active thrust belt and dextral (right lateral) strike-slip motion along the Main Recent Fault to the northeast of the Zagros Mountains.

== Earthquake ==
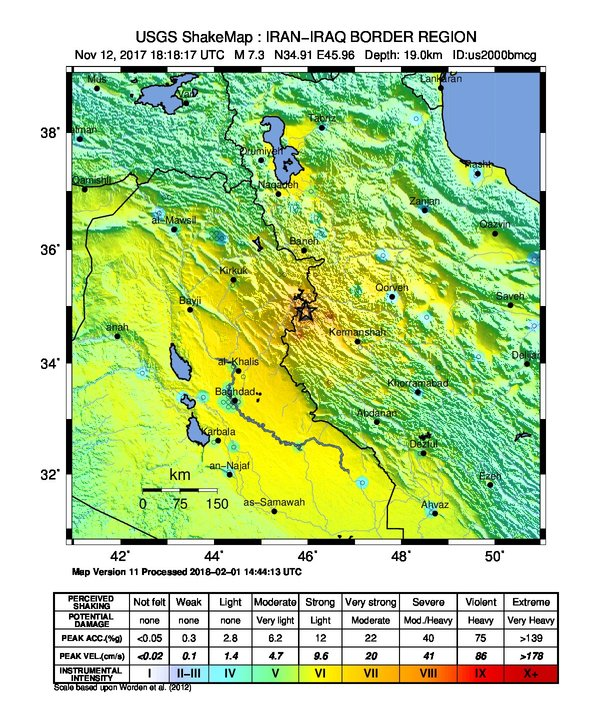
USGS shakemap.

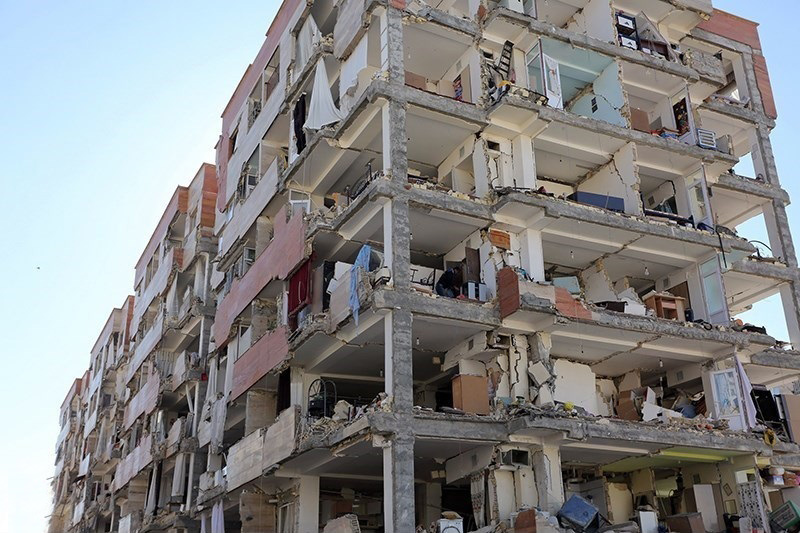
Damaged apartment block of the Mehr housing project in Sarpol-e Zahab, Iran

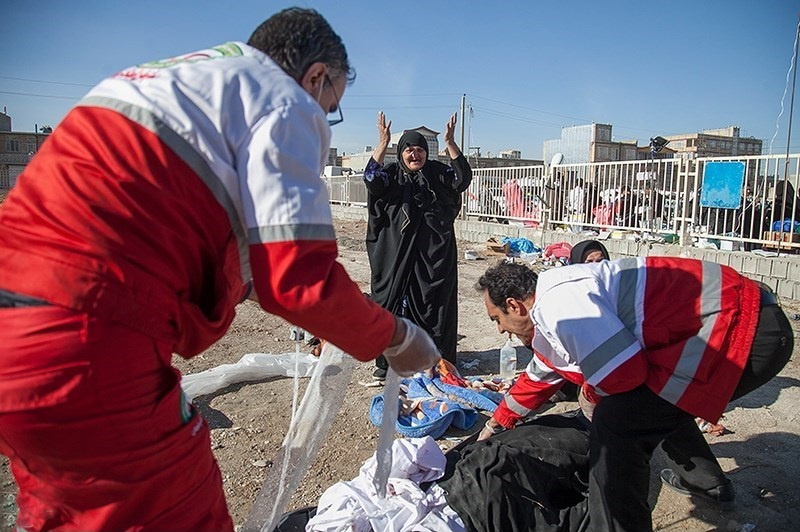
Red Crescent offering help for the injured people

Chart of the aftershocks that followed 12 November main shock

The earthquake occurred near the Iran–Iraq border, approximately 220 kilometres (140 mi) northeast of Baghdad. The International Seismological Centre (ISC) reported a magnitude of M_{w} 7.4 on the moment magnitude scale. According to the United States Geological Survey, the earthquake was caused by movement on a thrust fault dipping at a shallow angle to the northeast. The hypocentre was at a depth of 19.0 kilometres (11.8 mi), and the maximum perceived intensity was IX (Violent) on the Mercalli intensity scale.

This was the first powerful earthquake recorded in the region since a 6.1 M_{w} event in January 1967. The earthquake was felt throughout the Middle East and as far away as Israel, the Arabian Peninsula and Turkey.

=== Aftershocks ===
| Date | M_{w} | Casualties | Notes | Source(s) |
| 2017-12-11 | 5.4 | 50 injured | Several houses destroyed | |
| 2018-01-06 | 5.0 | 51 injured | Additional damage | |
| 2018-01-11 | 5.5 | 5 injured | Some old homes destroyed | |
| 2018-04-01 | 5.0 | 54 injured | - | |
| 2018-06-26 | 4.7 | 12 injured | - | |
| 2018-07-22 | 5.8 | 287 injured | Severe damage | |
| 2018-08-26 | 6.0 | 3 dead, 243 injured | Further damage | |
| 2018-11-26 | 6.3 | 1 dead, 761 injured | Severe damage | |

The Iranian seismological centre registered at least 50 aftershocks within a few hours of the earthquake, with a total of 242 earthquakes. These aftershocks killed at least four and injured at least 1,488 others.

== Aftermath ==
=== Casualties and damage ===
The province of Kermanshah was the most affected area along with the cities of Halabja, Iraq and Sarpol-e Zahab being the hardest-hit. Ezgeleh was the nearest city to the epicentre of the earthquake. More than half of the Iranian casualties were from Sarpol-e-Zahab and the Ezgeleh District, which have a combined population of over 30,000. Officials announced closure of schools in Kermanshah and Ilam provinces following the quake.

630 people died. More than 7,000 others were injured. In Sarpol-e Zahab, the hospital was damaged and at least 142 people were killed, many who had lived in social housing complexes built by former president Mahmoud Ahmadinejad. At least seven people were killed and another 500 injured in neighbouring Iraq, according to officials in Iraqi Kurdistan. Further damages were seen as possible due to the threat of landslides induced by the shallow depth of the earthquake.

The earthquake left about 70,000 people homeless across 14 Iranian provinces, destroying approximately 12,000 homes and damaging another 15,000. Relief camps in Iran distributed 22,000 tents and 52,000 blankets in the days after the earthquake. On 17 November, the Iranian government announced that the disaster has caused at least €5 billion of damage.

In Sarpol-e Zahab, some residents blamed the widespread destruction on poor construction quality and government corruption. It was noted that older buildings remained standing, while many newer blocks collapsed.

=== Aid ===
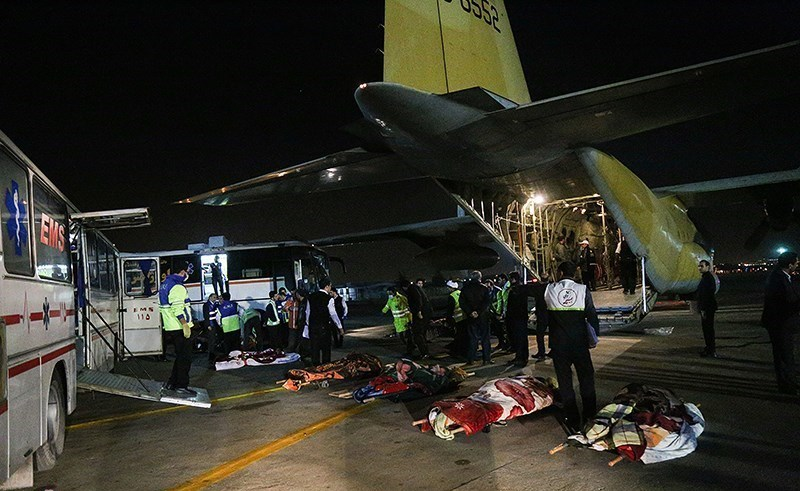
Military plane at Merhabad Airport carrying injured people

Turkey was the first country to offer aid, through its Disaster and Emergency Management Presidency, announcing that 92 rescue personnel were on standby, together with 4,000 tents and 7,000 blankets.

European Union Foreign Policy Chief Federica Mogherini said the bloc was ready to cooperate with Iran in providing emergency relief aid, and Italy's government issued orders to send 12 tonnes of tents, blankets and mobile kitchens on 13 November.

The International Committee of the Red Cross had arrived by 13 November. Sunni charities, such as the Iranian Call and Reform Organisation, were providing tents and water. Rescue dogs were also used by the Iranian Red Crescent in order to search for survivors.

The South Korean actress Lee Young-ae donated $45,000 to the Embassy of Iran in Seoul to help the victims of the earthquake.

On 14 November, Iranian minister of foreign affairs Mohammad Javad Zarif expressed his gratitude for all the sympathy and offers of assistance Iran has received but declared that his country can manage the situation with its own resources for the time being.

It was also reported that the Iranian Officials were visiting various affected places to provide assistance, according to CNN.

== See also ==
- List of earthquakes in 2017
- List of earthquakes in Iran
