= 2018 Sarpol-e Zahab earthquake =

Earthquake in Iran

2018 Kermanshah earthquake
- Location within Iran
- UTC time: 2018-11-25 16:37:17
- ISC event: 614337169
- USGS-ANSS: ComCat
- Local date: 25 November 2018
- Local time: 20:07 Time in Iran 19:37 Time in Iraq
- Magnitude: 6.3 M_{w}
- Epicenter: 34.304°N 45.740°E
- Areas affected: Iran; Iraq
- Max. intensity: MMI VII (Very strong)
- Casualties: 1 dead 886 injured

2018 Sarpol-e Zahab earthquake (زمین‌لرزه ۱۳۹۷ سرپل ذهاب) with magnitude 6.3 earthquake struck western Iran near its border with Iraq at 20:07 local time (19:37 local time in Iraq) on Sunday night, 25 November 2018 injuring over 700 people and sending fearful residents running into the street. One fatality and 45 injuries were also reported in the neighbouring Iraq. According to CNN, some houses were destroyed in several rural areas of Qasr-e-Shirin and SarPol-e zahab. As soon as the quake stopped, several rescue teams were quickly dispatched, the authorities said.

The tremor was also felt in the Iraqi capital Baghdad and in Kuwait. It was also experienced in Erbil, in the region of Kurdistan, according to Al Jazeera.

== See also ==
- List of earthquakes in Iran
- 2017 Iran–Iraq earthquake
