= Kafraj, Hamadan =

Village in Hamadan province, Iran

Kafraj Persian: كفراج
- Village
- Location within Iran
- Coordinates: 34°13′28″N 48°20′11″E
- Country: Iran
- Province: Hamadan
- County: Nahavand
- District: Central
- Rural District: Tariq ol Eslam

Population (2016)
  - Total: 1,337
- Time zone: UTC+3:30 (IRST)

Kafraj (Persian: كفراج) (Note: Also romanized as Kafrāj and Kefraj; formerly known as Kafrāsh (کفراش)) is a village in Tariq ol Eslam Rural District of the Central District in Nahavand County, Hamadan province, Iran.

== Demographics ==
=== Population ===
At the time of the 2006 National Census, the village's population was 1,670 in 421 households. The following census in 2011 counted 1,539 people in 514 households. The 2016 census measured the population of the village as 1,337 people in 457 households.
