= Geology of Botswana =

The geology of Botswana plays a significant part in the country's economy. The basement rocks of the Kaapvaal-Zimbabwe craton extend into Botswana whilst in the east and southeast, metamorphic rocks of Archaean age are dominant. A younger cover of Karoo rocks and post-Cretaceous Kalahari Group sediments conceal the western margins of these older rocks and largely conceal Proterozoic orogenic belts too. This younger stratum was laid down in the Kalahari Basin underlying large parts of the centre of the country. In the northwest of Botswana, more recent sediments overlie rocks of Meso- and Neoproterozoic age rocks, belonging probably to the Damara Belt.

The city of Orapa, located in Eastern Botswana, contains a fossilized crater lake with the most insect and plant bearing taphocoenosis of middle Cretaceous in Africa.

== Economic geology ==
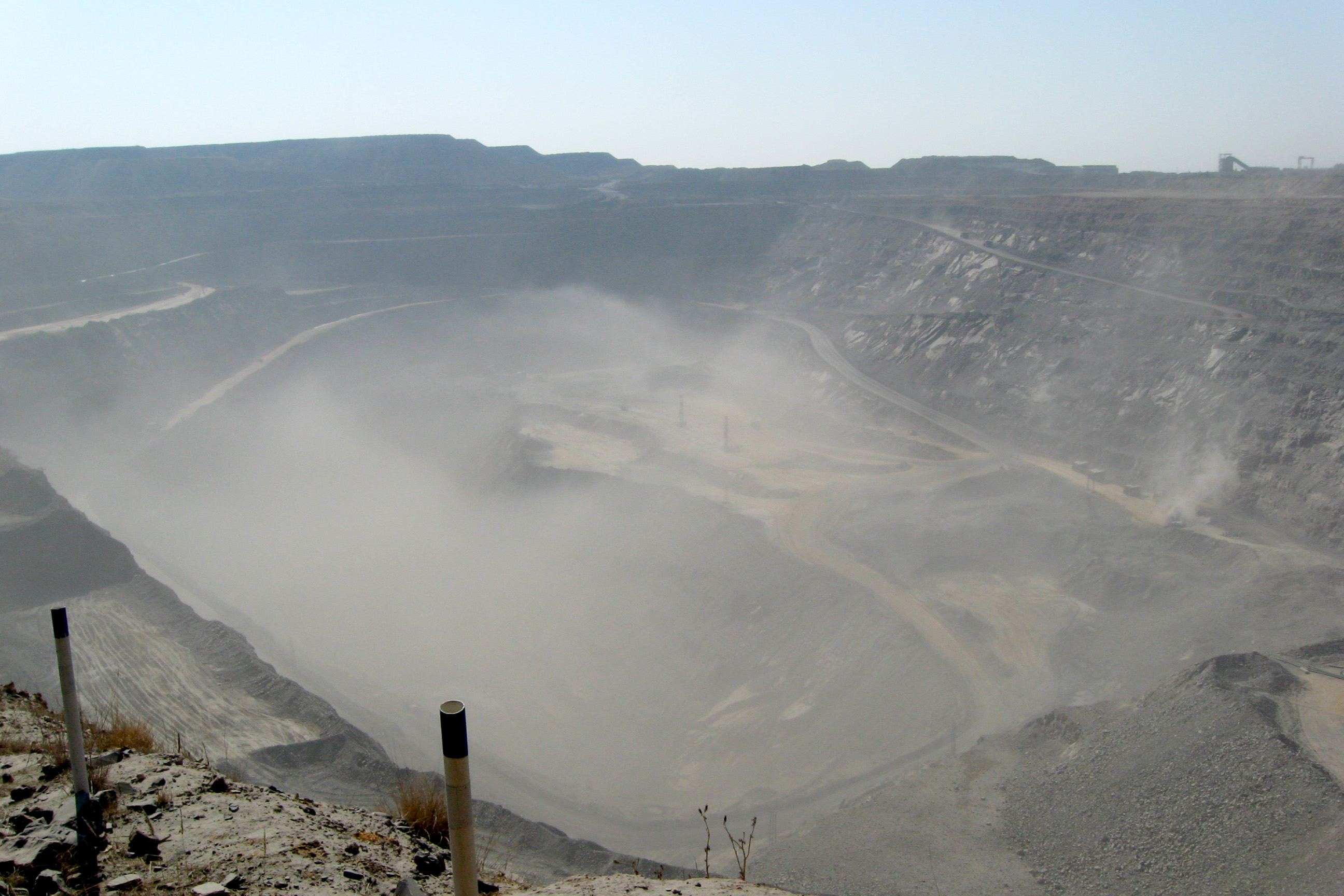
Jwaneng diamond mine, the richest diamond mine in the world.

The mining of diamonds is especially important to Botswana's economy accounting in 2007 for over a quarter of the country's GDP. Indeed, Botswana was the leading global diamond producer by value and second only to the Russian Federation in terms of volume. There are more than 20 kimberlite pipes, mostly of Cretaceous age, in Botswana, though the especially diamondiferous Jwaneng pipe dates from the Permian. The country also produces copper, gold, nickel and cobalt whilst coal and soda ash are also significant, reserves of the latter being second only to those of the United States of America. Coal reserves in the east of the country are estimated at 17 billion tonnes. Botswana also produces salt and a variety of semi-precious stones including both agate and carnelian.
