= Qaleh-ye Qobad, Kermanshah =

Qaleh-ye Qobad قلعه قباد
- Village
- Location within Iran
- Coordinates: 34°16′43″N 47°16′22″E
- Country: Iran
- Province: Kermanshah
- County: Kermanshah
- Bakhsh: Central
- Rural District: Dorudfaraman

Population (2006)
  - Total: 113
- Time zone: UTC+3:30 (IRST)
  - Summer (DST): UTC+4:30 (IRDT)

Qaleh-ye Qobad (Persian: قلعه قباد, also Romanized as Qal‘eh-ye Qobād and Qal‘eh Qobād; also known as Qal‘eh Kabūd) is a village in Dorudfaraman Rural District, in the Central District of Kermanshah County, Kermanshah Province, Iran. At the 2006 census, its population was 113, in 22 families.
