= Moiyabana =

Village in Botswana

Coordinates: 22°38′7″S 26°24′16″E

Location of Moiyabana

Moiyabana is a village in Central District of Botswana. The village is located 50 km south-west of Serowe, and it has primary and secondary schools and a health clinic. The population was 2,619 in 2001 census.
