= Chaliki =

Chaliki چليكي
- Village
- Location within Iran
- Coordinates: 37°03′35″N 50°07′15″E
- Country: Iran
- Province: Gilan
- County: Langarud
- Bakhsh: Otaqvar
- Rural District: Lat Leyl

Population (2006)
  - Total: 83
- Time zone: UTC+3:30 (IRST)
  - Summer (DST): UTC+4:30 (IRDT)

Chaliki (Persian: چليكي, also Romanized as Chalīkī) is a village in Lat Leyl Rural District, Otaqvar District, Langarud County, Gilan Province, Iran. At the 2006 census, its population was 83, in 22 families.
