= Jol Khvor =

Jol Khvor جل خور
- Village
- Location within Iran
- Coordinates: 33°52′00″N 46°14′00″E
- Country: Iran
- Province: Ilam
- County: Eyvan
- Bakhsh: Zarneh
- Rural District: Kalan

Population (2006)
  - Total: 47
- Time zone: UTC+3:30 (IRST)
  - Summer (DST): UTC+4:30 (IRDT)

Jol Khvor (Persian: جل خور, also Romanized as Jol Khowr; also known as Chaulak, Chavlak, Chovalk, and Chūlak) is a village in Kalan Rural District, Zarneh District, Eyvan County, Ilam Province, Iran. At the 2006 census, its population was 47, in 10 families. The village is populated by Kurds.
