= 2017 Batangas earthquakes =

Earthquakes in the Philippines

- 2017 Southern Luzon earthquakes
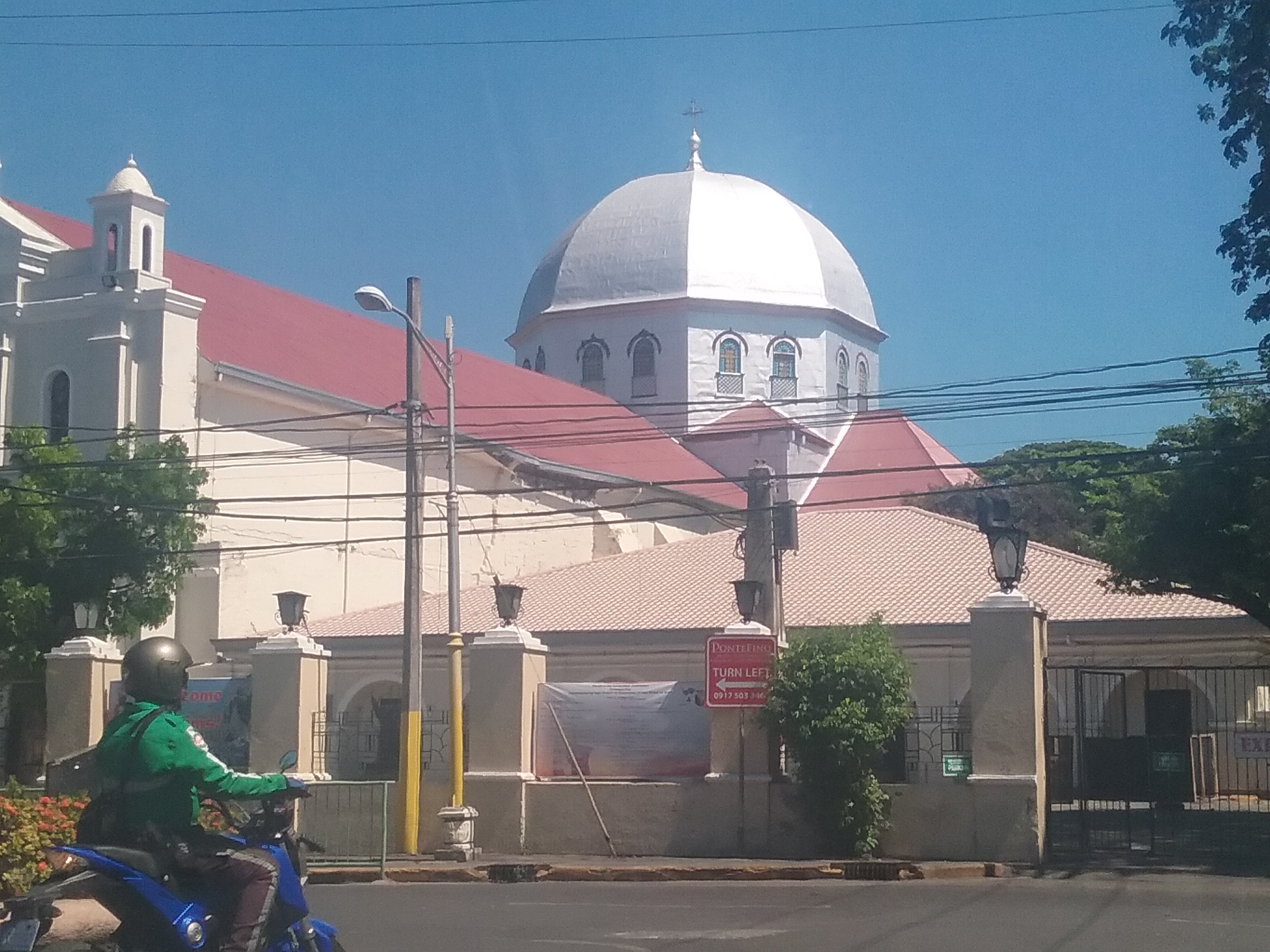
- The partially damaged Basilica of the Immaculate Conception in Batangas City after the earthquake

- Location within Philippines
- UTC time: 2017-04-08 07:09:23
- ISC event: 610639847
- USGS-ANSS: ComCat
- Local date: April 8, 2017
- Local time: 15:09:21 PST
- Magnitude: 6.0 M_{s} (Note: PHIVOLCS recorded the strongest earthquake as having a surface wave magnitude of 6.0 while the United States Geological Survey recorded the same earthquake's moment magnitude as 5.9. Addressing the discrepancy, PHIVOLCS notes the USGS has a relatively small number of stations in the Philippines, claiming that their figure is more accurate.)
- Depth: 8 km (5 mi)
- Epicenter: 12°42′N 120°56′E
- Type: Tectonic
- Areas affected: Calabarzon, Mimaropa, Metro Manila
- Total damage: ₱18 million (April 4 earthquake)
- Max. intensity: PEIS VII (MMI VI)
- Tsunami: No
- Landslides: Yes
- Aftershocks: 2,390
- Casualties: 6 injured

The 2017 Batangas earthquakes were an earthquake swarm that occurred from early April to mid-August 2017, affecting the province of Batangas in the Philippines and other nearby areas.

The first major earthquake occurred on April 4 at 8:58 pm Philippine Standard Time, with a surface-wave magnitude of 5.5 off the coast of Batangas. According to the PHIVOLCS earthquake intensity scale, the earthquake had an intensity of VII (Very Strong).

On April 8, stronger earthquakes occurred in the province. The PHIVOLCS recorded the strongest earthquake later that afternoon that had a surface wave magnitude of 6.0. Another earthquake struck on August 11, with a surface wave magnitude of 6.3.

Three years later, Taal Volcano, about 25 kilometers from the epicenter, erupted after 43 years of inactivity.

== Earthquakes ==
=== April 4 earthquake ===
The quake was recorded by PHIVOLCS on April 4, 2017, at 8:58 PM (UTC+8). Based on that record, the epicenter of the 5.5 earthquake was located 7 kilometers northwest of Tingloy, Batangas. The earthquake was of tectonic origin. Metro Manila and nearby provinces felt shaking at Intensity 3 while Obando, Bulacan felt Intensity 4, and Batangas City experienced Intensity 6 shaking. The earthquake is suspected to be the caused by the movement of the Lubang Fault. At 1:00 pm on April 7, PHIVOLCS stated that they have recorded 934 aftershocks; 118 of which were plotted and while 14 were reportedly felt.

=== April 8 earthquakes ===
Two earthquakes occurred near the towns of Mabini and Tanauan on April 8. PHIVOLCS recorded the first earthquake which occurred near Mabini at 3:07 pm as having a surface wave magnitude of 5.6 while the second earthquake which happened in Talaga Proper, Mabini, Batangas, at 3:09 pm was recorded as having a surface wave magnitude of 6.0. The United States Geological Survey (USGS) recorded the first as a magnitude 5.7 earthquake while the second as a moment magnitude of 5.9 earthquake.

=== August 11 earthquake ===
PHIVOLCS recorded the earthquake which occurred at 1:28 pm as having a surface wave magnitude of 6.3. The United States Geological Survey (USGS) recorded the earthquake as a moment magnitude of 6.2 earthquake.

== Shocks ==
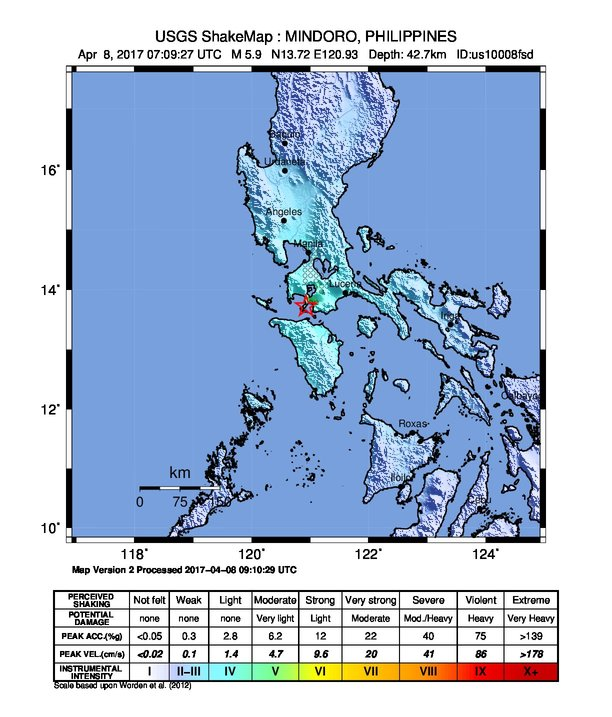
Shakemap of the strongest earthquake on April 8, 2017, which was prepared by the USGS.

Earthquakes with at least magnitude 5 as recorded by PHIVOLCS:

Date / time (PST)	Magnitude	Type	Depth Hypocenter	Epicenter			Ref.
Date / time (PST)	Magnitude	Type	Depth Hypocenter	Location	Latitude	Longitude	Ref.
April 4, 2017 20:58:45	5.5	M_{s}	7 km (4.3 mi)	Tingloy	13.68°N	120.93°E	Report
April 8, 2017 15:07:55	5.6	M_{s}	27 km (17 mi)	Mabini	13.75°N	120.93°E	Report
April 8, 2017 15:09:21	6.0	M_{s}	8 km (5.0 mi)	Mabini	13.70°N	120.93°E	Report
August 11, 2017 13:28:00	6.3	M_{s}	177 km (110 mi)	Nasugbu	13.95°N	120.52°E	Report

== Impact ==
Damages on some buildings, resorts and houses have been reported. The Basilica of Saint Martin of Tours or Taal Basilica, which is considered to be the largest Roman Catholic Church in Asia and located in Taal, Batangas, sustained damage during the April 4 earthquake. The April 8 earthquakes caused concrete blocks to fall from the church facade. The Basilica of the Immaculate Conception Church in Batangas City also sustained damage on its walls during the April 8 quake.

The Batangas Provincial capitol also sustained damaged from the April 4 earthquake. The initial estimated cost of damage to the building was ₱18 million. On April 5, the Batangas provincial government declared a state of calamity.

Six people were injured by the April 8 quake. Around 14,000 people were temporarily relocated in evacuation centers.

During his installation on April 21, 2017, Lipa Archbishop Gilbert Garcera ordered Father Aurelio Oscar Dimaapi to temporarily close the Minor Basilica of the Immaculate Conception in order to prevent injuries.

In the aftermath of the August 11 tremor, many students were disturbed since the tremor struck during class hours. Several schools suspended classes after the earthquake. So far, no damage has been reported.

=== Power ===
The earthquake also damaged several power plants supplying the Luzon Grid, one generator unit of the Ilijan Power Plant, one unit of Avion Power Plant, all units of Santa Rita Combined Cycle Power Plant, and one unit of San Lorenzo Combined Cycle Power Plant, resulting to a loss of 2,584 MW. The switchyard of San Lorenzo Power Plant was damaged and a transmission tower was toppled also by the earthquakes. As a result, the power supply reserve for Luzon decreased, leading the National Grid Corporation of the Philippines to place the Luzon Grid on "yellow" alert on April 10 and 11, and the Department of Energy ordered immediate repair of power plants damaged. A policy to protect the grid from earthquake damage is being drafted by the Department of Energy after the quakes.

== See also ==
- List of earthquakes in 2017
- List of earthquakes in the Philippines
- 2020 Taal Volcano eruption, occurred three years after the earthquake
