= Chulaki (31°48′ N 49°52′ E), Izeh =

Chulaki چولكي
- Village
- Location within Iran
- Coordinates: 31°47′50″N 49°51′31″E
- Country: Iran
- Province: Khuzestan
- County: Izeh
- Bakhsh: Central
- Rural District: Howmeh-ye Sharqi

Population (2006)
  - Total: 87
- Time zone: UTC+3:30 (IRST)
  - Summer (DST): UTC+4:30 (IRDT)

Chulaki (Persian: چولكي, also Romanized as Chūlakī and Chūlekī; also known as Chaliki and Chelīkī) is a village in Howmeh-ye Sharqi Rural District, in the Central District of Izeh County, Khuzestan Province, Iran. At the 2006 census, its population was 87, in 14 families.
