= 2017 Java earthquake =

Earthquake centered in Tasikmalaya, West Java, Indonesia

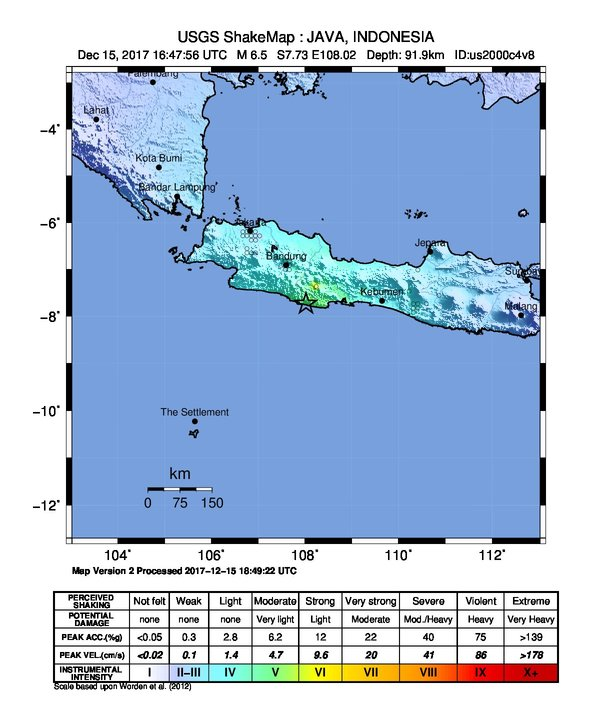
- UTC time: 2017-12-15 16:47:58
- ISC event: 611604605
- USGS-ANSS: ComCat
- Local date: 15 December 2017
- Local time: 23:47:58 WIB
- Duration: 1–10 seconds
- Magnitude: 6.5 M_{w}
- Depth: 91.9 km (57.1 mi)
- Epicenter: 7.492°S 108.174°E
- Fault: Indo-Australian plate
- Type: Strike-slip
- Areas affected: South Sumatra, Lampung, West Java, Central Java, East Java, Yogyakarta, Banten, Jakarta, Bali.
- Max. intensity: MMI VII (Very strong)
- Tsunami: No
- Landslides: Unknown
- Aftershocks: 19 confirmed
- Casualties: 4 dead 36 injured 200 displaced

The 2017 Java earthquake occurred on 15 December 2017 when a moment magnitude 6.5 earthquake struck the Indonesian island of Java, specifically the city of Tasikmalaya on 23:47:58 West Indonesian Time (16:47:58 UTC) in West Java, Indonesia. The earthquake struck at a depth of 91 km and was categorized as a strong but deep earthquake. It was initially registered as a 7.3 magnitude earthquake by Indonesian agencies. Widespread damage was reported across Tasikmalaya, the nearest major city to the epicentre. A tsunami warning was immediately issued by the authorities but was subsequently cancelled. Four people have been confirmed dead.

== Earthquake ==
The earthquake struck with a moment magnitude of 6.5 M_{w} near Tasikmalaya, West Java at 23:47 local time. The epicentre was reportedly located 11 km from Tasikmalaya. Strong shaking were widely reported across West Java, Central Java, Banten, Yogyakarta and Jakarta. Hundreds of people rushed out from high rise buildings in the capital Jakarta. People in Yogyakarta also reported strong shaking during the earthquake. In Bali the earthquake was registered as a light shaking in the Mercalli intensity scale. Strong shaking was also reported in Mataram, West Nusa Tenggara. The earthquake struck at 23:47, meaning that most residents were sleeping during the earthquake.

The earthquake was initially registered as a 7.3 M_{w} and prompted a tsunami warning due to its intensity. There were also unconfirmed reports which claimed that there were two earthquakes in Java. Confusion and panic immediately ensued and sounds of horns were heard everywhere as streets were jammed. People who were living in the coastal area were told to evacuate to high grounds. Tsunami warnings and advisory were in effect in several locations in Java, particularly in Tasikmalaya and Pangandaran. The Indonesian Agency for Meteorology, Climatology and Geophysics stated that tsunami warnings were issued in Ciamis and Tasikmalaya. Tsunami advisories were in effect in the following regencies and cities in Java: Bantul, Kulonprogo, Cianjur (Sindangbarang), Garut, Sukabumi (Ujung-Genteng), Cilacap, Kebumen.

Rise in water level has been reported in Tasikmalaya. However, Indonesian official later confirmed that there was no tsunami. The warning was subsequently cancelled on 02.26 WIB. Authorities later advised people to return to their homes.

== Aftermath ==
Widespread damage was reported in cities near the epicentre. At least 40 houses collapsed and 2,953 were heavily damaged. A municipal hospital was damaged in Banyumas, while a man was killed in Ciamis as his house collapsed due to the earthquake. An elderly woman was killed in a house collapse. Another injury was reported in Kebumen after a house collapsed. Photos of damaged structures were widely shared in social media. Numerous houses were either damaged or collapsed in Pangandaran Regency, West Java. A woman died in Bantul because she panicked and fell when the earthquake happened. A person died of a heart attack in Ciamis during an earthquake. Two women were killed by fallen debris in Pekalongan and Ciamis.

Immediately after the earthquake, reports of blackouts were widely received by the government. Government officials in Cilacap, Central Java reported that at least 504 structures across Cilacap Regency were either badly damaged or destroyed due to the earthquake. Eight schools reportedly collapsed in Garut. A stadium in Wonosobo, Central Java was badly damaged. As many as 2,935 structures across Java were damaged, most of them were structures in West Java. Indonesian National Board for Disaster Management in Tasikmalaya received reports that 6,000 structures were damaged. The total cost of damage that was caused by the earthquake was estimated to be at around Rp 4,6 billion.

President Joko Widodo was immediately informed about the earthquake and subsequently ordered aids for the people affected by the quake. Social Minister Khofifah Indar Parawansa announced that the government would send supplies of foods and medicines. The Social Ministry announced that aids equivalent to Rp 823 million have been delivered to the hardest hit areas. Hundreds of personnel were deployed to clear debris. The earthquake revealed that tsunami detection system in Indonesia was still minimal. Twenty two tsunami buoys were found to be inoperative since 2012.
