= Attu Station, Alaska =

- CDP
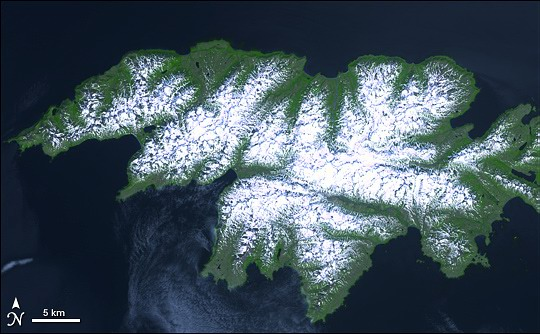
- Attu Island with land area of 892.795 km^{2} (344.710 sq mi)

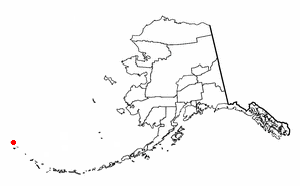
- Location of Attu Station, Alaska
- Coordinates: 52°50′47″N 173°11′10″E
- Country: United States
- State: Alaska
- Census Area: Aleutians West

Government
  - State senator: Lyman Hoffman (D)
  - State rep.: Bryce Edgmon (I)

Area
  - Total: 143.62 sq mi (371.97 km^{2})
  - Land: 142.54 sq mi (369.17 km^{2})
  - Water: 1.08 sq mi (2.80 km^{2})

Population (2020)
  - Total: 0
  - Density: 0/sq mi (0/km^{2})
- Time zone: UTC-10 (Hawaii-Aleutian (HST))
  - Summer (DST): UTC-9 (HDT)
- ZIP code
- Area code: 907
- FIPS code: 02-04670

Attu is a census-designated place (CDP) located on Attu Island in the Aleutians West Census Area in the U.S. state of Alaska. The community consisted entirely of Coast Guard personnel who resided and worked at Casco Cove Coast Guard Station, but they left the island when the station was closed in August 2010, leaving it uninhabited. As of the 2020 census, Attu Station had a population of 0. LORAN Station Attu had provided a navigational signal for mariners of the North Pacific since the 1970s.

Although it is relatively the westernmost point in the United States, Attu Station is technically one of the easternmost points, located at 52°50′47″N 173°11′10″E, opposite the 180th meridian from the rest of the United States.

== History ==
After the Japanese invasion of Attu Island and the battle to retake it, the United States government constructed a LORAN station on the southern tip of the island, at Theodore Point. The equipment to build the station came from Holtz Bay and was ferried on barges and landing craft to Baxter Cove, about 1 mile (1.6 km) east of the station. Bulldozers were used to cut a road from Baxter Cove to Theodore Point.

In 1960, the station was moved to Casco Cove, near the former United States Navy base at Massacre Bay. Later, it was moved to Massacre Bay. LORAN Station Attu ceased transmission of the LORAN signal on February 8, 2010, and the Russian-American signal ceased on August 1, 2010. There has been no talk of reviving Attu since 2010.

In 2025, the U.S. Naval Institute proposed reviving the military airfield on Attu.

== Geography ==
According to the U.S. Census Bureau, the CDP has a total area of 143.6 square miles (371.9 km^{2}), for which 142.6 square miles (369.3 km^{2}) of it is land and 1.1 square miles (2.8 km^{2}) of it (0.75%) is water.

== Demographics ==
Historical population
Census	Pop.	Note	%±
1980	28		—
2000	20		—
2010	21		5.0%
2020	0		−100.0%
U.S. Decennial Census

Attu (Naval) Station first appeared on the 1980 U.S. Census as "Attu", a census-designated place (CDP). It did not return on the 1990 census. The name was changed to Attu Naval Station and redesignated a CDP in 2000. It appeared on the 2010 census with a population of 21 just before the closure of the station in August that year and the departure of its remaining residents.

=== 2020 census ===
Attu Station CDP, Alaska – Racial and ethnic composition Note: the US Census treats Hispanic/Latino as an ethnic category. This table excludes Latinos from the racial categories and assigns them to a separate category. Hispanics/Latinos may be of any race.
Race / Ethnicity (NH = Non-Hispanic)	Pop 2000	Pop 2010	Pop 2020	% 2000	% 2010	% 2020
White alone (NH)	15	15	0	75.00%	71.43%	0.00%
Black or African American alone (NH)	0	0	0	0.00%	0.00%	0.00%
Native American or Alaska Native alone (NH)	0	1	0	0.00%	4.76%	0.00%
Asian alone (NH)	0	0	0	0.00%	0.00%	0.00%
Native Hawaiian or Pacific Islander alone (NH)	0	1	0	0.00%	4.76%	0.00%
Other race alone (NH)	0	0	0	0.00%	0.00%	0.00%
Mixed race or Multiracial (NH)	0	0	0	0.00%	0.00%	0.00%
Hispanic or Latino (any race)	5	4	0	25.00%	19.05%	0.00%
Total	20	21	0	100.00%	100.00%	0.00%

At the 2000 census there were 20 people, 0 households, and 0 families in the CDP. The population density was 0.1 inhabitants per square mile (0.039/km^{2}). There were 0 housing units at an average density of 0.0 units per square mile (0 units/km^{2}). The racial makeup of the CDP was 18 White, 1 from other races, and 1 from two or more races. Five of the population were Hispanic or Latino of any race. The age distribution was 7 from 18 to 24, 12 from 25 to 44, and 1 from 45 to 64. The median age was 30 years. There were 19 men and one woman.

Males had a median income of $26,250, which is the same as for females. The per capita income for the CDP was $26,964. None of the population was below the poverty line.

As noted above, however, due to the closure of the station the community is presently uninhabited.
