= Tariq ol Eslam Rural District =

Rural district in Hamadan province, Iran

Tariq ol Eslam Rural District Persian: دهستان طريق الاسلام
- Rural District
- Location within Iran
- Coordinates: 34°17′N 48°18′E
- Country: Iran
- Province: Hamadan
- County: Nahavand
- District: Central
- Established: 1987
- Capital: Deh Ful

Population (2016)
  - Total: 13,171
- Time zone: UTC+3:30 (IRST)

Tariq ol Eslam Rural District (Persian: دهستان طريق الاسلام) is in the Central District of Nahavand County, Hamadan province, Iran. Its capital is the village of Deh Ful.

== Demographics ==
=== Population ===
At the time of the 2006 National Census, the rural district's population was 13,956 in 3,603 households. There were 13,513 inhabitants in 4,160 households at the following census of 2011. The 2016 census measured the population of the rural district as 13,171 in 4,174 households. The most populous of its 24 villages was Deh Ful, with 2,416 people.

=== Other villages in the rural district ===
- Deh Bureh
- Dehqanabad-e Chulak
- Do Cheshmeh
- Gusheh-ye Sad-e Vaqas
- Kafraj
- Tayemeh
