= Gamasiyab Rural District (Nahavand County) =

Rural district in Hamadan province, Iran

Gamasiyab Rural District Persian: دهستان گاماسياب
- Rural District
- Location within Iran
- Coordinates: 34°05′N 48°25′E
- Country: Iran
- Province: Hamadan
- County: Nahavand
- District: Central
- Established: 1987
- Capital: Baba Qasem

Population (2016)
  - Total: 13,616
- Time zone: UTC+3:30 (IRST)

Gamasiyab Rural District (Persian: دهستان گاماسياب) is in the Central District of Nahavand County, Hamadan province, Iran. Its capital is the village of Baba Qasem.

== Demographics ==
=== Population ===
At the time of the 2006 National Census, the rural district's population was 14,597 in 3,834 households. There were 14,983 inhabitants in 4,461 households at the following census of 2011. The 2016 census measured the population of the rural district as 13,616 in 4,244 households. The most populous of its 32 villages was Varayeneh, with 1,719 people.

=== Other villages in the rural district ===
- Bian
- Deh-e Heydar
- Gamasb
- Qaleh-ye Qobad
- Sefid Khaneh
- Sohran
