= Central District (Nahavand County) =

District in Hamadan province, Iran

Central District (Nahavand County) Persian: بخش مرکزی شهرستان نهاوند
- District
- Location within Iran
- Coordinates: 34°12′N 48°21′E
- Country: Iran
- Province: Hamadan
- County: Nahavand
- Capital: Nahavand

Population (2016)
  - Total: 117,270
- Time zone: UTC+3:30 (IRST)

The Central District of Nahavand County (Persian: بخش مرکزی شهرستان نهاوند) is in Hamadan province, Iran. Its capital is the city of Nahavand.

== Demographics ==
=== Population ===
At the time of the 2006 National Census, the district's population was 116,092 in 30,864 households. The following census in 2011 counted 119,191 people in 35,849 households. The 2016 census measured the population of the district as 117,270 inhabitants in 36,778 households.

=== Administrative divisions ===
Central District (Nahavand County) Population
Administrative Divisions	2006	2011	2016
Gamasiyab RD	14,597	14,983	13,616
Shaban RD	15,321	15,250	14,321
Tariq ol Eslam RD	13,956	13,513	13,171
Nahavand (city)	72,218	75,445	76,162
Total	116,092	119,191	117,270
RD = Rural District
