= Joseph Welland =

Joseph Welland may refer to:

- Joseph Welland (architect) (1798-1860), Irish architect
- Joseph Welland (missionary) (1834-1879), Irish missionary
