= 1879 =

1879 in various calendars
- Gregorian calendar: 1879; MDCCCLXXIX
- Ab urbe condita: 2632
- Armenian calendar: 1328; ԹՎ ՌՅԻԸ
- Assyrian calendar: 6629
- Baháʼí calendar: 35–36
- Balinese saka calendar: 1800–1801
- Bengali calendar: 1285–1286
- Berber calendar: 2829
- British Regnal year: 42 Vict. 1 – 43 Vict. 1
- Buddhist calendar: 2423
- Burmese calendar: 1241
- Byzantine calendar: 7387–7388
- Chinese calendar: 戊寅年 (Earth Tiger); 4576 or 4369 — to — 己卯年 (Earth Rabbit); 4577 or 4370
- Coptic calendar: 1595–1596
- Discordian calendar: 3045
- Ethiopian calendar: 1871–1872
- Hebrew calendar: 5639–5640
- Hindu calendars
- Vikram Samvat: 1935–1936
- Shaka Samvat: 1800–1801
- Kali Yuga: 4979–4980
- Holocene calendar: 11879
- Igbo calendar: 879–880
- Iranian calendar: 1257–1258
- Islamic calendar: 1296–1297
- Japanese calendar: Meiji 12 (明治１２年)
- Javanese calendar: 1807–1808
- Julian calendar: Gregorian minus 12 days
- Korean calendar: 4212
- Minguo calendar: 33 before ROC 民前33年
- Nanakshahi calendar: 411
- Thai solar calendar: 2421–2422
- Tibetan calendar: ས་ཕོ་སྟག་ལོ་ (male Earth-Tiger); 2005 or 1624 or 852 — to — ས་མོ་ཡོས་ལོ་ (female Earth-Hare); 2006 or 1625 or 853

1879 (MDCCCLXXIX) was a common year starting on Wednesday of the Gregorian calendar and a common year starting on Monday of the Julian calendar, the 1879th year of the Common Era (CE) and Anno Domini (AD) designations, the 879th year of the 2nd millennium, the 79th year of the 19th century, and the 10th and last year of the 1870s decade. As of the start of 1879, the Gregorian calendar was 12 days ahead of the Julian calendar, which remained in localized use until 1923.

== Events ==
=== January ===
- January 1
  - The Specie Resumption Act takes effect. The United States Note is valued the same as gold, for the first time since the American Civil War.
  - Brahms' Violin Concerto is premiered in Leipzig with Joseph Joachim as soloist and the composer conducting.
- January 11 – The Anglo-Zulu War begins.
- January 22 – Anglo-Zulu War – Battle of Isandlwana: A force of 1,200 British soldiers is wiped out by over 20,000 Zulu warriors.
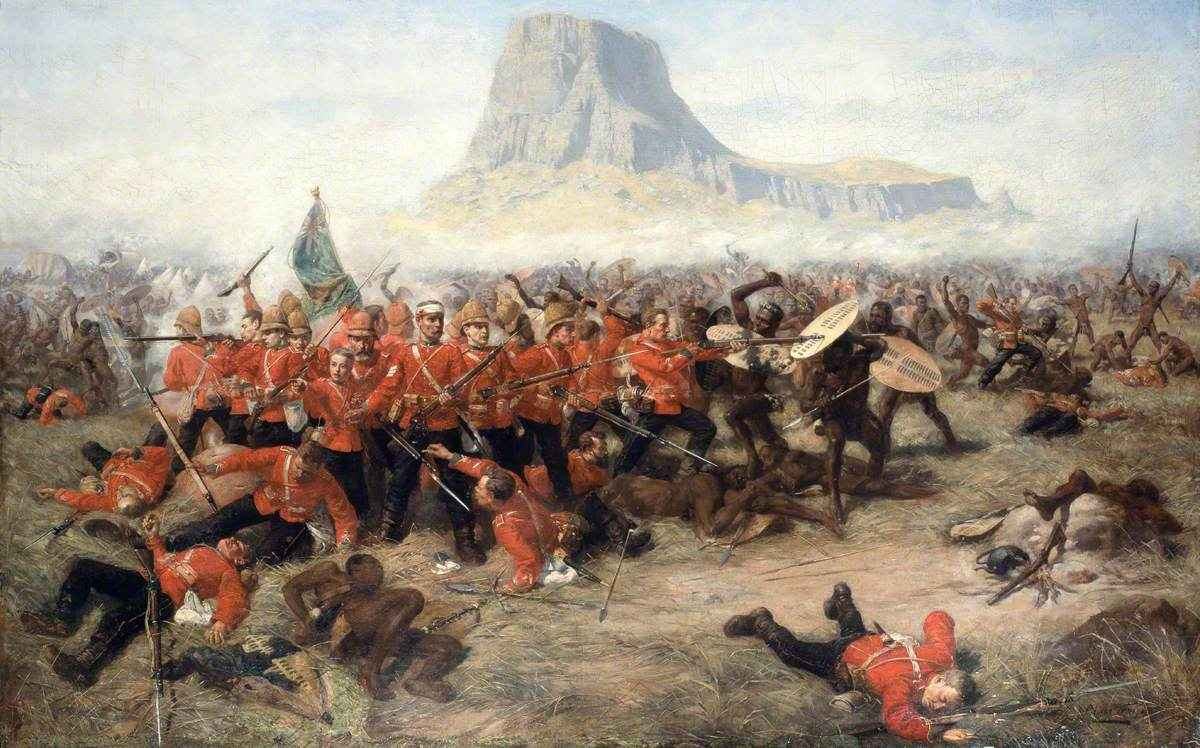
  January 22: Battle of Isandlwana
- January 23 – Anglo-Zulu War – Battle of Rorke's Drift: Following the previous day's defeat, a smaller British force of 140 successfully repels an attack by 4,000 Zulus.
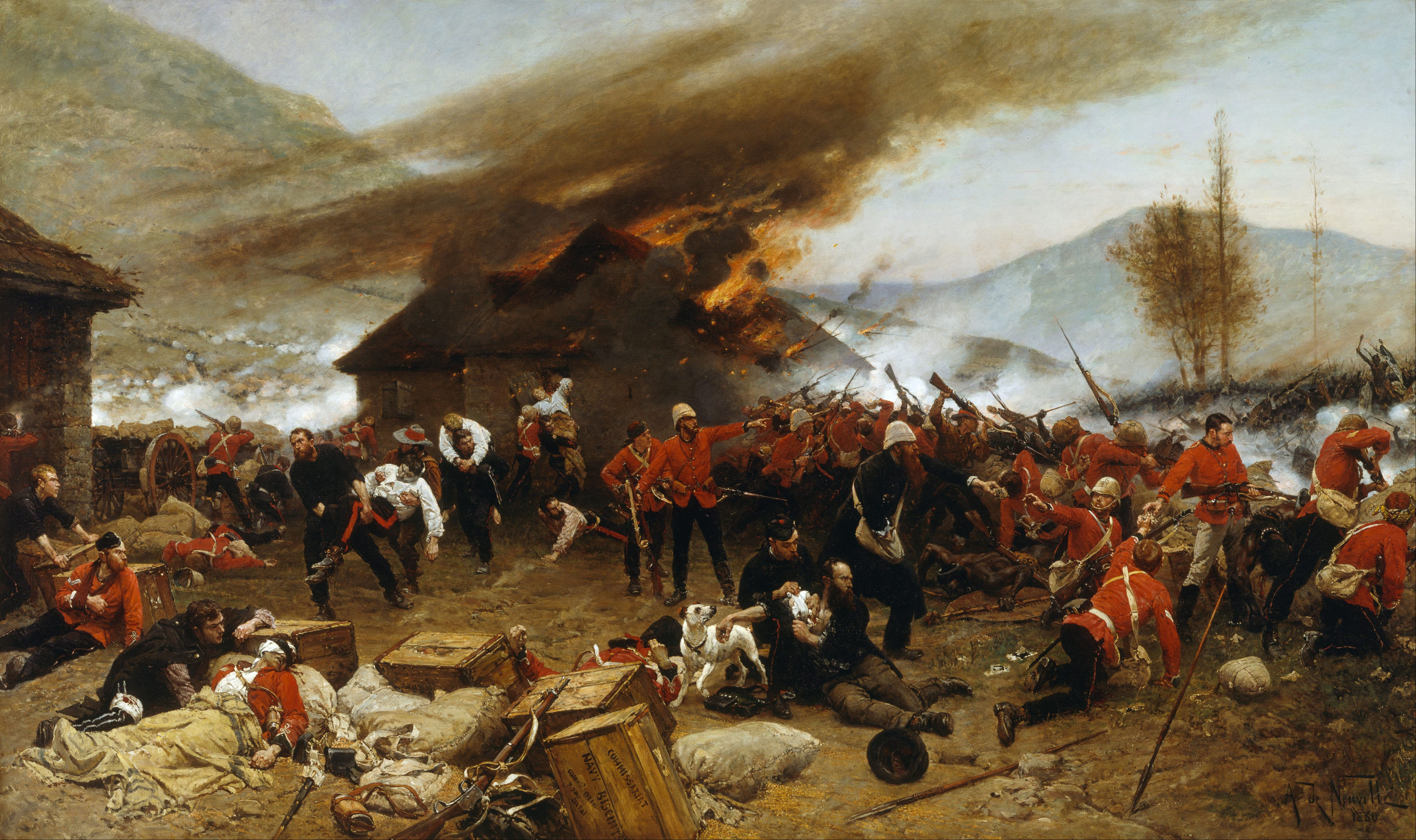
  January 22–23: Battle of Rorke's Drift

=== February ===
- February 3 – Mosley Street in Newcastle upon Tyne (England) becomes the world's first public highway to be lit by the electric incandescent light bulb invented by Joseph Swan.
- February 8 – At a meeting of the Royal Canadian Institute, engineer and inventor Sandford Fleming first proposes the global adoption of standard time.

=== March ===
- March 3 – United States Geological Survey is founded.
- March 11 – The Ryukyu Domain is incorporated into the Okinawa Prefecture of Japan and the last ruler, Shō Tai, exiled to Tokyo.
- March 25 – Dvořák's Symphony No. 5 in F major, Op. 76, B. 54, is premiered (four years after being written) in Prague with Adolf Čech conducting.
- March 28 – Anglo-Zulu War – Battle of Hlobane: British forces suffer a defeat.
- March 29 – Anglo-Zulu War – Battle of Kambula: British forces defeat 20,000 Zulus.

=== April ===
- April 5 – War of the Pacific: Chile formally declares war on Bolivia and Peru.
- April 12 – Mary Baker Eddy founds the Church of Christ, Scientist in Boston, Massachusetts.
- April 26 – The National Park, later renamed the Royal National Park, is declared in New South Wales, Australia, the world's second-oldest purposed national park.
- April – Postman Ferdinand Cheval begins to build his Palais Idéal at Hauterives in France.

=== May ===
- May 2 – The Spanish Socialist Workers' Party (Partido Socialista Obrero Español) is founded clandestinely at the Casa Labra tavern in Madrid, by printer Pablo Iglesias.
- May 7 – The current constitution of the State of California in the United States is ratified.
- May 10 – The Archaeological Institute of America (AIA) is formed.
- May 12 – English Catholic convert John Henry Newman is elevated to Cardinal.
- May 14 – The first group of 463 Indian indentured labourers arrive in Fiji, aboard the Leonidas.
- May 26 – Mohammad Yaqub Khan, Emir of Afghanistan, and the United Kingdom sign the Treaty of Gandamak, putting the Afghan state into the British sphere of influence.
- May 30 – New York City's Gilmore's Garden is renamed Madison Square Garden by William Henry Vanderbilt and is opened to the public at 26th Street and Madison Avenue.

=== June ===
- June 1 – Anglo-Zulu War: Louis-Napoléon, Prince Imperial of France, son of Napoléon III, is killed in a skirmish with Zulus while attached to the British Army.
- June 4 – Yasukuni Shrine is officially renamed from Tokyo Shokonsha Shrine in Japan.
- June 6 – William Denny and Brothers launch the world's first ocean-going steamer to be built of mild steel, the SS Rotomahana, on the River Clyde in Scotland. On October 2 they launch the first transatlantic steamer of the same material, the SS Buenos Ayrean; on December 1 she makes her maiden voyage out of Glasgow, bound for South America.
- June 14 – Sidney Faithorn Green, a priest in the Church of England, is tried and convicted for using Ritualist practices.
- June 21 – German chemical company Linde is founded by Carl von Linde.
- June 30 – The 1879 Surigao earthquake measuring M_{w} 7.4 causes major damage in the northern tip of Mindanao Island.

=== July ===
- July 1
  - An 8.0 earthquake shakes southern Gansu, killing 22,000 people.
  - American Restorationist Charles Taze Russell publishes the first issue of the monthly Zion's Watch Tower and Herald of Christ's Presence which, as The Watchtower, will become the most widely circulated magazine in the world.
- July 4 – Anglo-Zulu War – Battle of Ulundi: A British victory effectively ends the war.
- July 8 – Led by George W. De Long, the ill-fated United States Jeannette Expedition departs San Francisco, in an attempt to reach the North Pole, by pioneering a route through the Bering Strait.
- July 16 – The city of Kotka is founded in Kymenlaakso, Finland, by separating its two islands from the old Kymi parish.

=== August ===
- August 1 – Tokio Marine (insurer) is founded in Japan, as Tokio Marine Holdings.
- August 16 – Fulham F.C. is founded in London as a church soccer team.
- August 21 – Claimed apparition to local people at Knock, County Mayo, Ireland, of the Blessed Virgin Mary, Saint Joseph, Saint John the Evangelist and Jesus Christ (as the Lamb of God).

=== September ===
- September 8 – 1879 Octagon fire: A fire in The Octagon, Dunedin (New Zealand), claims 12 victims.
- September 19 – The Blackpool Illuminations in England are switched on for the first time.
- September 23 – The Macedo-Romanian Cultural Society is founded.
- September 25 – A fire in Deadwood, South Dakota, leaves 2,000 people homeless and 300 buildings destroyed; total loss of property is estimated at $3 million.
- September 26 – Wilhelm Marr founds the Antisemitenliga (League of Antisemites), the first German organization committed specifically to combating the alleged threat to German culture posed by Jews.
- September 29 – Meeker Massacre: Nathan Meeker and others are killed in an uprising at the White River Ute Indian reservation in Colorado.
- September – Henry George self-publishes his major work Progress and Poverty.

=== October ===
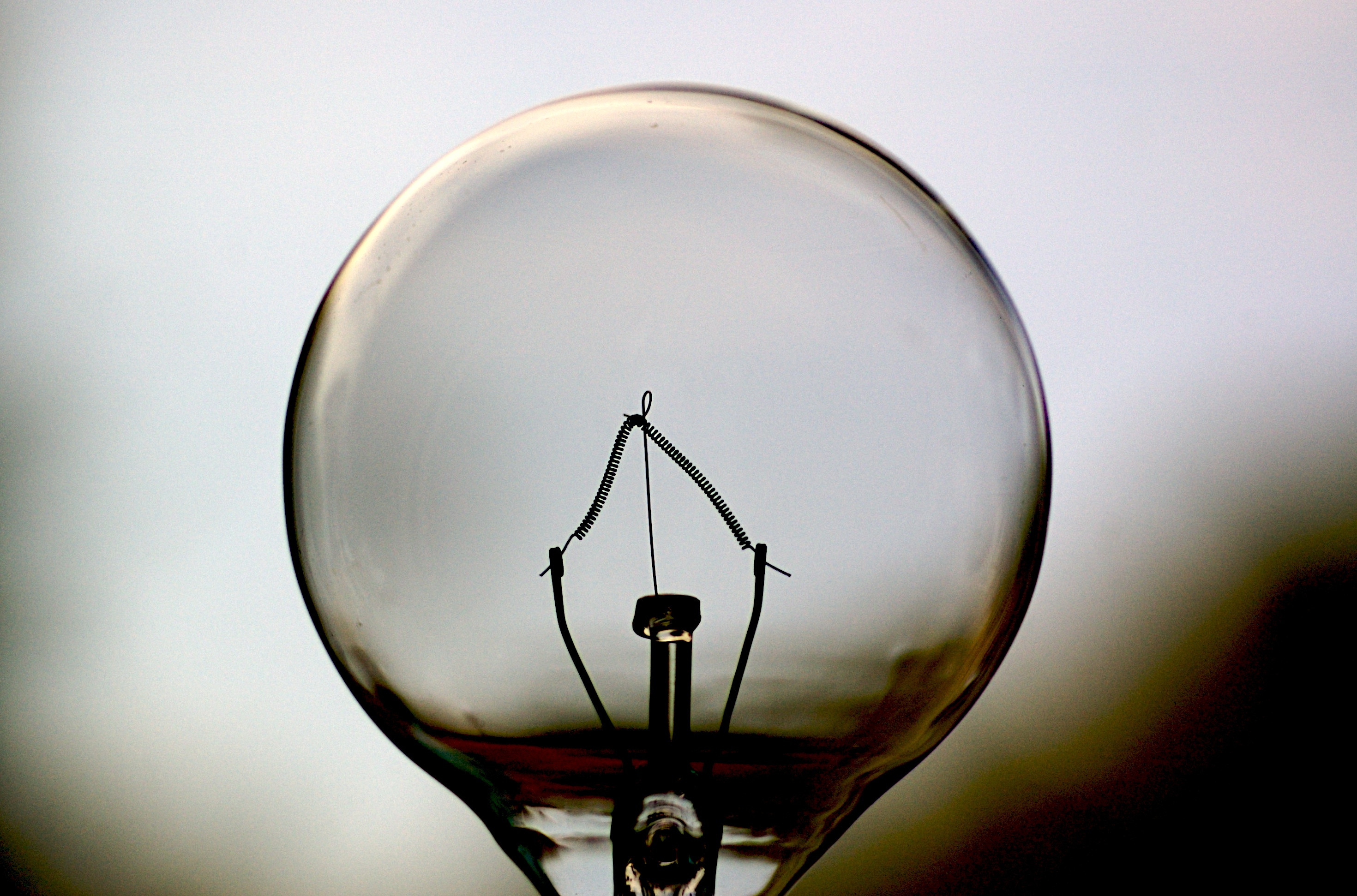
October 22 – Using a filament of carbonized thread, Thomas Edison tests his first practical electric light bulb

- October 1 – University of Nebraska Cornhusker Marching Band is founded in Lincoln, Nebraska. The group will go on to perform the first football halftime show in 1892 and, under Director Donald A. Lentz, invent Band Day.
- October 2 – Qing dynasty China signs the Treaty of Livadia with the Russian Empire.
- October 7 – The Dual Alliance is formed by Germany and Austria-Hungary.
- October 8 – War of the Pacific: Battle of Angamos – The Chilean Navy defeats Peruvian naval forces.
- October 13 – The first female students are admitted to study for degrees of the University of Oxford in England, at the new Lady Margaret Hall and Somerville Hall, and with the Society of Oxford Home-Students.
- October 17 – Sunderland Association Football Club is formed by a group of schoolteachers in northeast England.
- October 22 – Using a filament of carbonized thread, Thomas Edison tests his first practical electric light bulb (it lasts 13 1/2 hours before burning out).
- October 28 – The Hall effect is discovered by Edwin Hall at Johns Hopkins University in the United States.

=== November ===
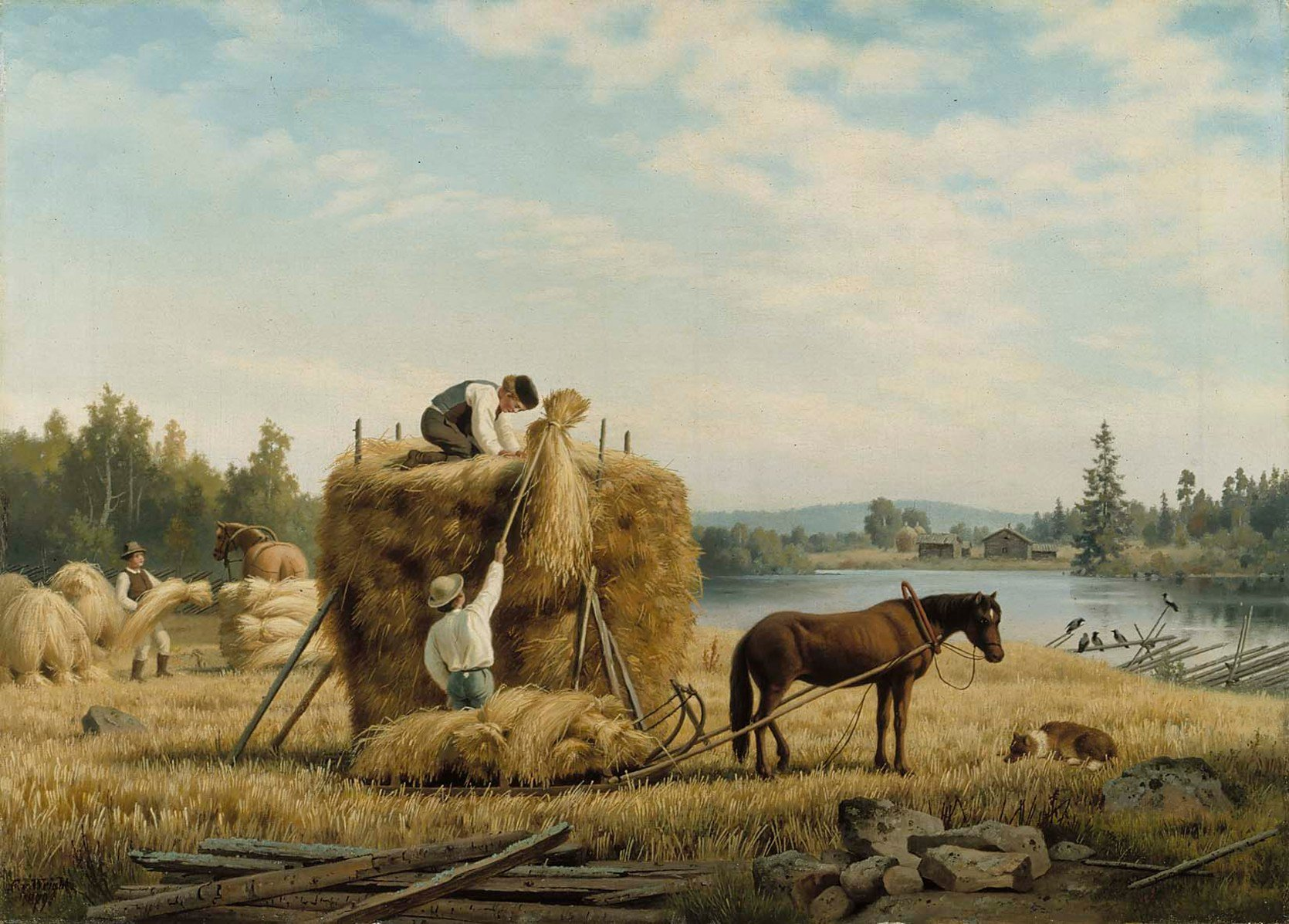
Harvesters in Finland in 1879, by Ferdinand von Wright

- November 4 – Thomas Edison applies for a patent for his invention of the incandescent light bulb (U.S. Patent 223,898 will be granted on January 27, 1880).
- November 10 – The Bell Telephone Company and Western Union reach an agreement in the United States, in which the former agrees to stay out of telegraphy and the latter to keep out of the telephone business.
- November – Land is acquired for Simmons College of Kentucky, a historically black school, established as a Baptist institution.

=== December ===
- December 2-28 – the Winter 1879 cold wave freeze Europe with record low temperatures.
- December 28 – Tay Bridge disaster: The central part of the Tay Rail Bridge at Dundee, Scotland, collapses in a storm as a train passes over it, killing 75.
- December 31
  - Thomas Edison demonstrates incandescent lighting to the public for the first time, in Menlo Park, New Jersey.
  - Gilbert and Sullivan's comic opera The Pirates of Penzance opens at the Fifth Avenue Theatre in New York City (following a token performance the day before for U.K. copyright reasons in Paignton, Devon).

=== Date unknown ===
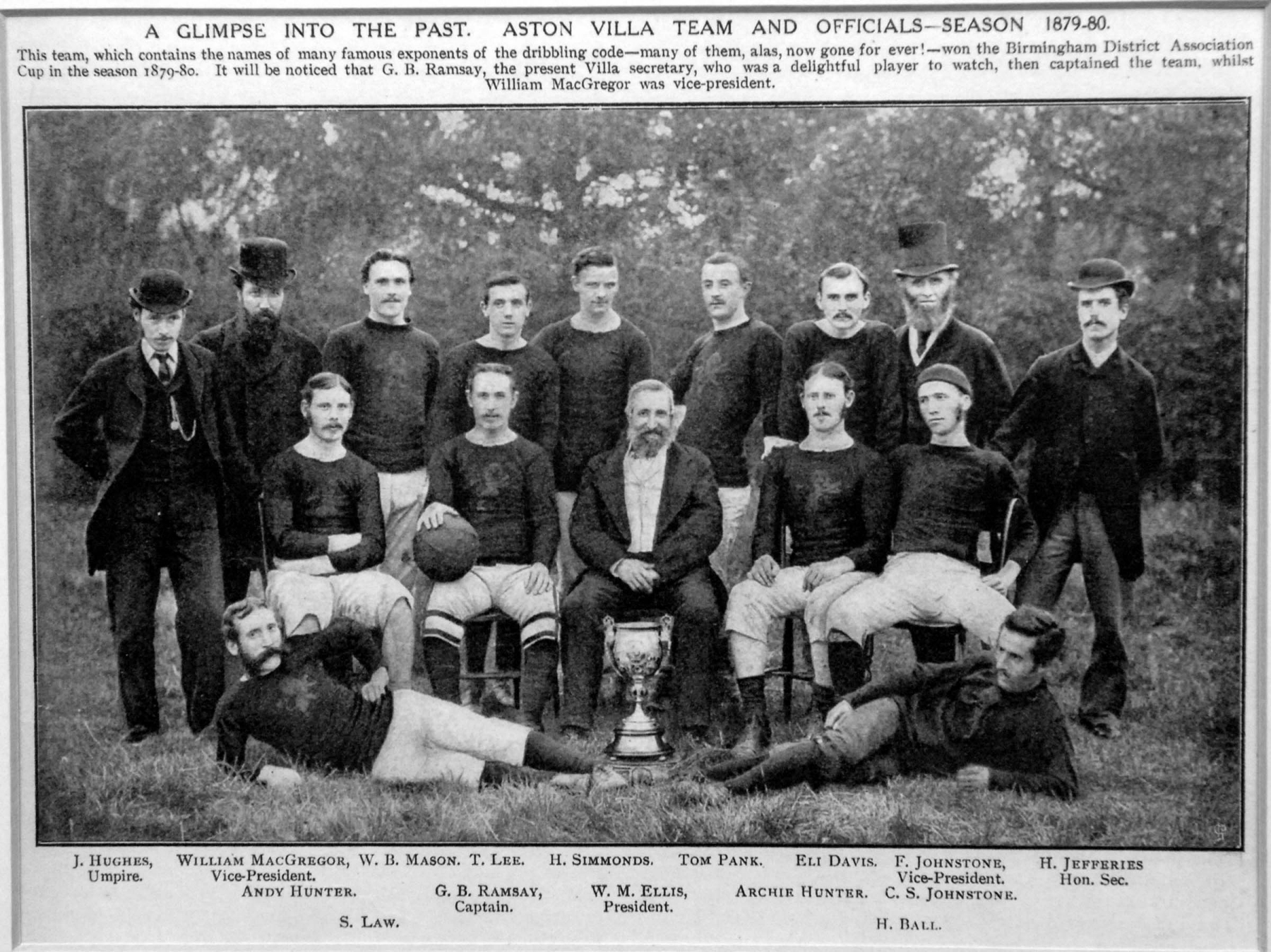
Aston Villa team and officials, 1879–80 season, which included their first-ever FA Cup appearance

- Colonel Ahmed ‘Urabi forms the Egyptian Nationalist Party.
- The Stefan–Boltzmann law is discovered by Jozef Stefan.
- Wilhelm Wundt establishes the first psychological research laboratory, at the University of Leipzig.
- Tetteh Quarshie first brings cocoa beans to Ghana from Equatorial Guinea.
- Gottlob Frege publishes Begriffsschrift, eine der arithmetischen nachgebildete Formelsprache des reinen Denkens in Halle, a significant text in the development of mathematical logic.

== Births ==
=== January–March ===
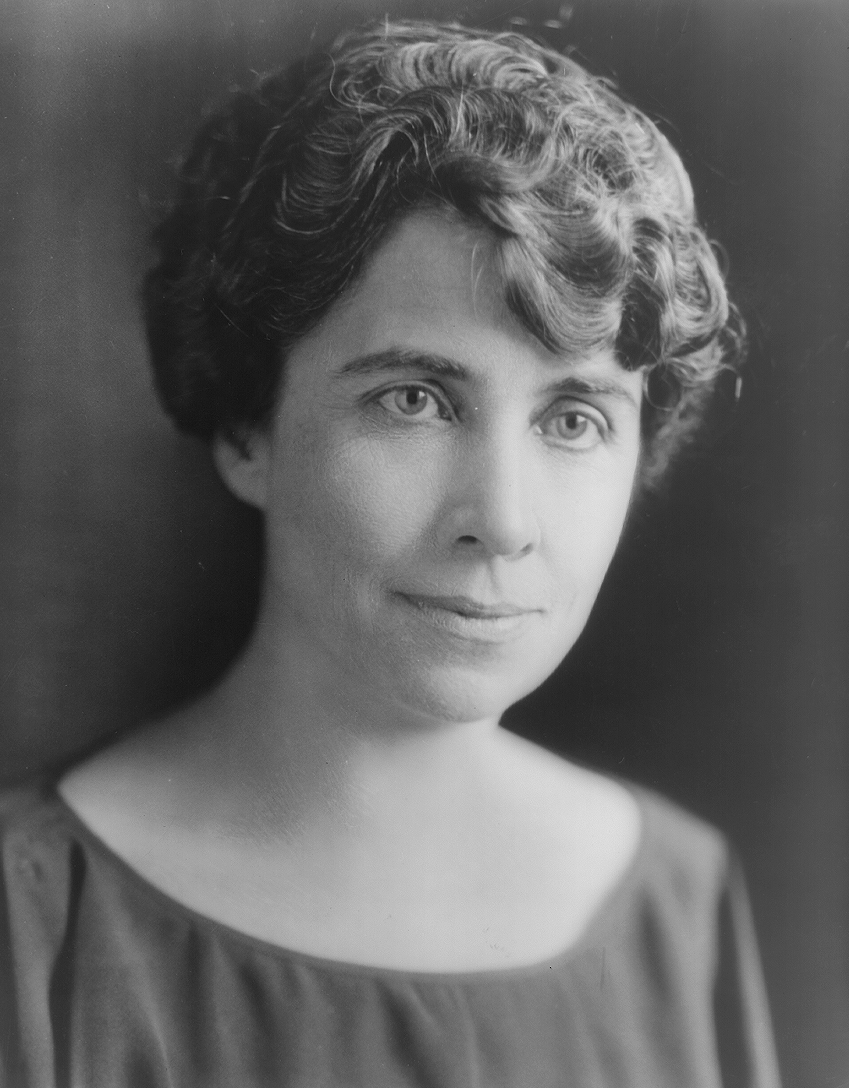
Grace Coolidge

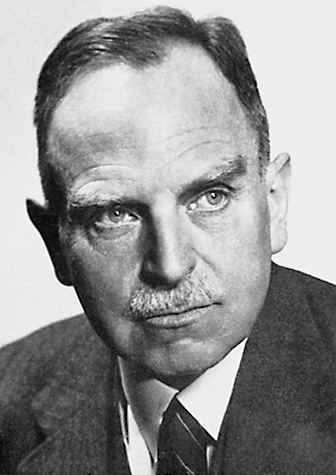
Otto Hahn

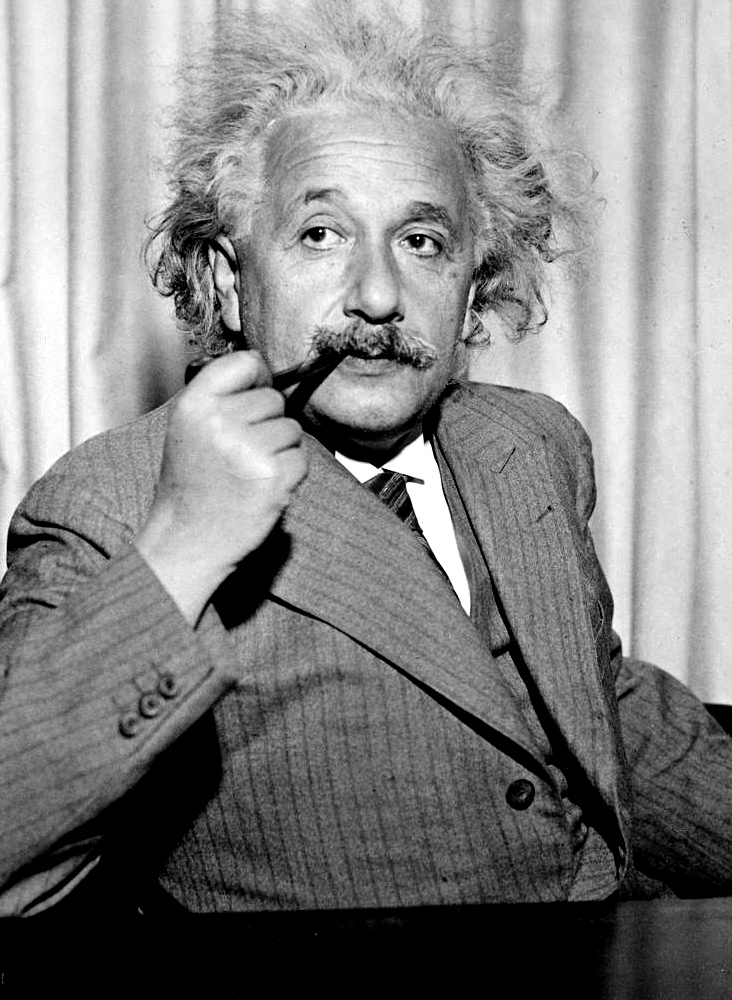
Albert Einstein

- January 1
  - E. M. Forster, English writer (d. 1970)
  - William Fox, Hungarian-American screenwriter and producer, founded the Fox Film Corporation and Fox Theatres (d. 1952)
- January 3 – Grace Coolidge, First Lady of the United States (d. 1957)
- January 12 – Calbraith Perry Rodgers, American pioneer aviator, makes first transcontinental U.S. flight (d. 1912)
- January 20 – Ruth St. Denis, American dancer (d. 1968)
- January 28
  - Betty Kuuskemaa, Estonian actress (d. 1966)
  - Francis Picabia, French painter, poet (d. 1953)
- February 6 – Magnús Guðmundsson, 3rd prime minister of Iceland (d. 1937)
- February 13 – Sarojini Naidu, Indian independence activist and poet (d. 1949)
- February 20 – Hod Stuart, Canadian professional ice hockey player (d. 1907)
- February 22
  - Johannes Nicolaus Brønsted, Danish chemist (d. 1947)
  - Norman Lindsay, Australian painter (d. 1969)
- February 26 – Frank Bridge, English composer (d. 1941)
- March 6 – William P. Cronan, 19th Naval Governor of Guam (d. 1929)
- March 8 – Otto Hahn, German chemist, Nobel Prize laureate (d. 1968)
- March 13 – Alfredo Kindelán, Spanish general and politician (d. 1962)
- March 14 – Albert Einstein, German-born physicist, Nobel Prize laureate (d. 1955)
- March 18 – Emma Carus, American opera singer (d. 1927)
- March 20 – Maud Menten, Canadian biochemist and medical researcher (d. 1960)
- March 26 – Othmar Ammann, Swiss-born American engineer (d. 1965)
- March 27
  - Sándor Garbai, Prime Minister of Hungary (d. 1947)
  - Edward Steichen, Luxembourgeois-born American painter and photographer (d. 1973)

=== April–June ===
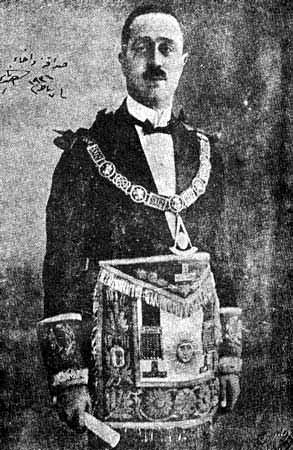
Ahmad Nami

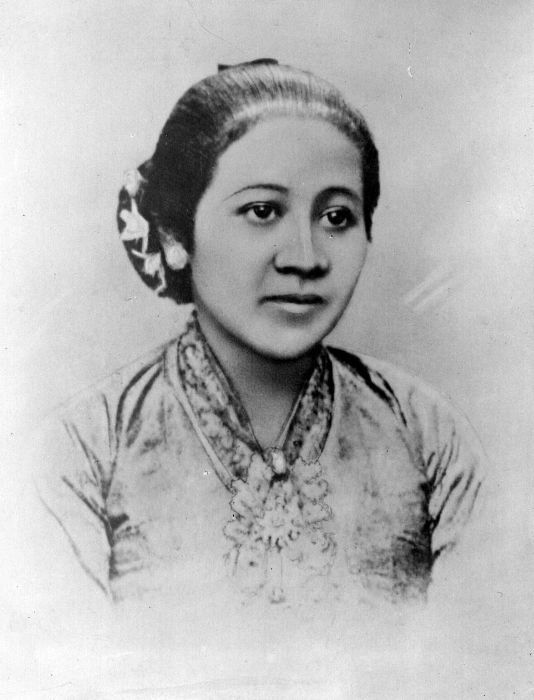
Kartini

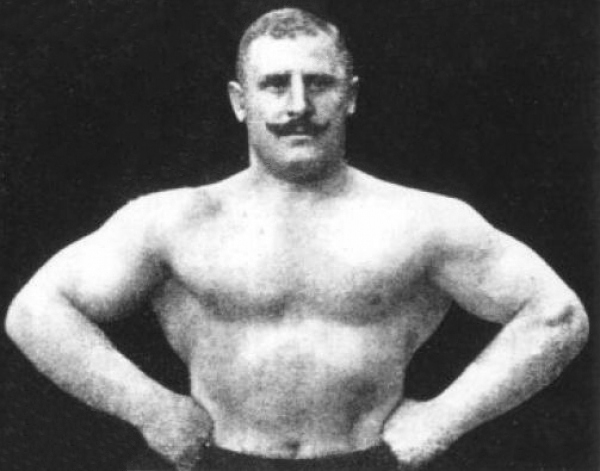
Richárd Weisz

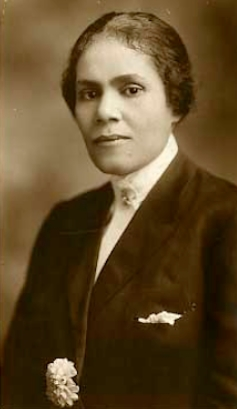
Georgia Ann Robinson

- April 1 – Mary J. L. Black, Canadian librarian and suffragist (d. 1939)
- April 9 – Thomas Meighan, American actor (d. 1936)
- April 11 – Bernhard Schmidt, German-Estonian optician, inventor (d. 1935)
- April 16 – Gala Galaction, Romanian writer (d. 1961)
- April 20
  - Italo Gariboldi, Italian general (d. 1970)
  - Robert Wilson Lynd, Irish essayist, writer (d. 1949)
  - Paul Poiret, French couturier (d. 1944)
- April 21
  - Kartini, Indonesian national heroine, women's rights activist (d. 1904)
  - Mary Willie Arvin, American nurse (d. 1947)
- April 26 – Owen Willans Richardson, British physicist, Nobel Prize laureate (d. 1959)
- April 29 – Sir Thomas Beecham, English conductor (d. 1961)
- April 30 – Richárd Weisz, Hungarian Olympic champion wrestler (d. 1945)
- May 6 – Bedřich Hrozný, Czech orientalist, linguist (d. 1952)
- May 11 – Ahmad Nami, Prince of the Ottoman Empire, 5th Prime Minister of Syria and 2nd President of Syria (d. 1962)
- May 12
  - George Landenberger, United States Navy Captain and the 23rd Governor of American Samoa (d. 1936)
  - Georgia Ann Robinson, community worker, first African-American woman to be appointed a Los Angeles police officer (d. 1961)
- May 16 – Gustaf Aulén, Bishop of Strängnäs in the Church of Sweden (d. 1977)
- May 19
  - Nancy Astor, Viscountess Astor, American-born British politician, wife of Waldorf Astor, 2nd Viscount Astor (d. 1964)
  - Waldorf Astor, 2nd Viscount Astor, British businessman, politician, husband of Nancy Astor, Viscountess Astor (d. 1952)
- May 20 – Hans Meerwein, German chemist (d. 1965)
- May 22 – Alla Nazimova, Russian-born American stage, film actress (d. 1945)
- May 25 – Max Aitken, 1st Baron Beaverbrook, Canadian-born British statesman and newspaper publisher (d. 1964)
- May 27 – Lucile Watson, Canadian-born American film, stage actress (d. 1962)
- May 28 – Milutin Milanković, Serbian scientist (d. 1958)
- June 3 – Raymond Pearl, American biologist (d. 1940)
- June 4 – Mabel Lucie Attwell, British illustrator (d. 1964)
- June 9 – Joseph Avenol, 2nd Secretary General of the League of Nations (d. 1952)
- June 7 – Knud Rasmussen, Danish polar explorer, anthropologist (d. 1933)
- June 10 – Rafael Erich, Prime Minister of Finland (d. 1946)
- June 13
  - Charalambos Tseroulis, Greek general (d. 1929)
  - Lois Weber, American film director, screenwriter (d. 1939)
- June 23 – Huda Sha'arawi, Egyptian feminist (d. 1947)

=== July–September ===
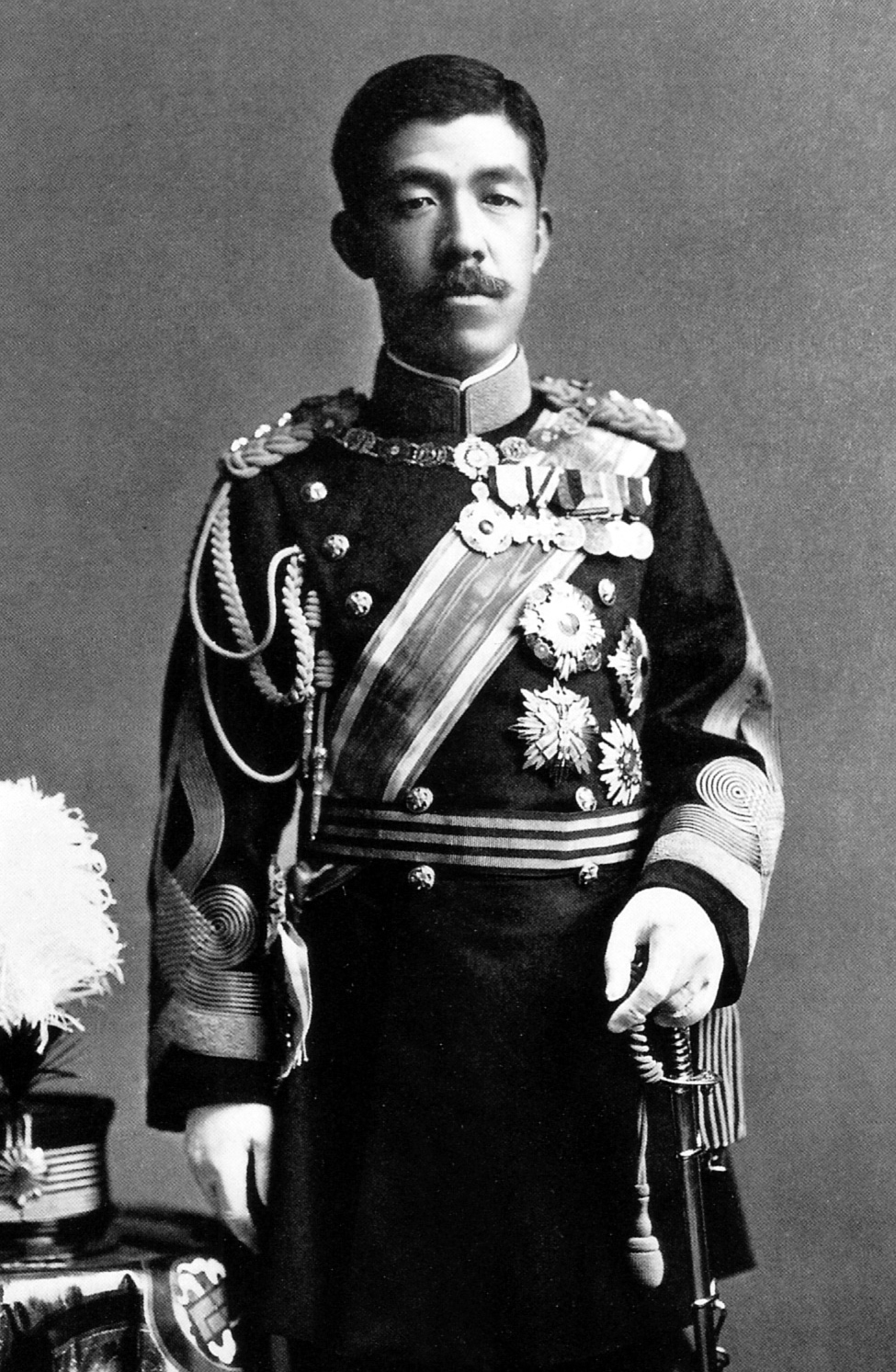
Emperor Taishō

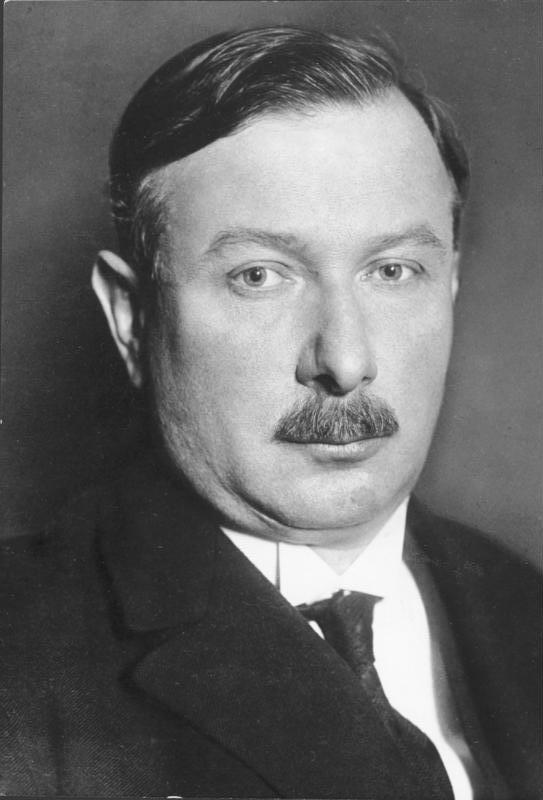
Joseph Wirth

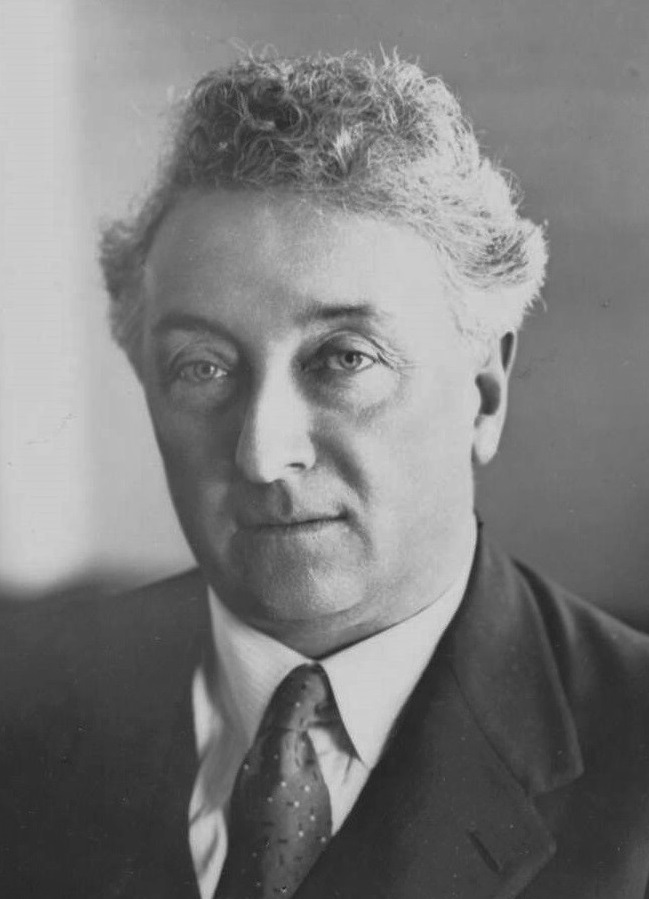
Joseph Lyons

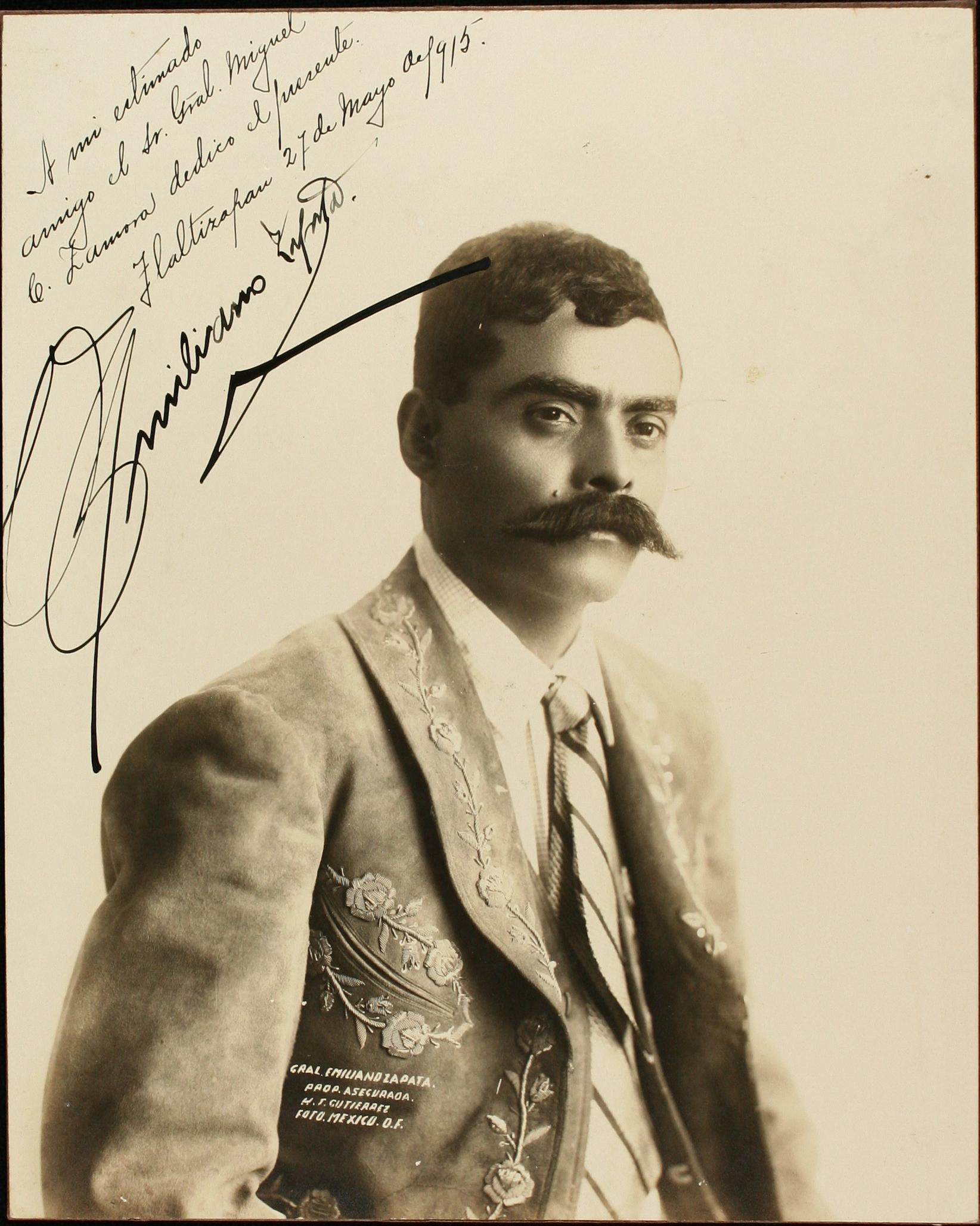
Emiliano Zapata

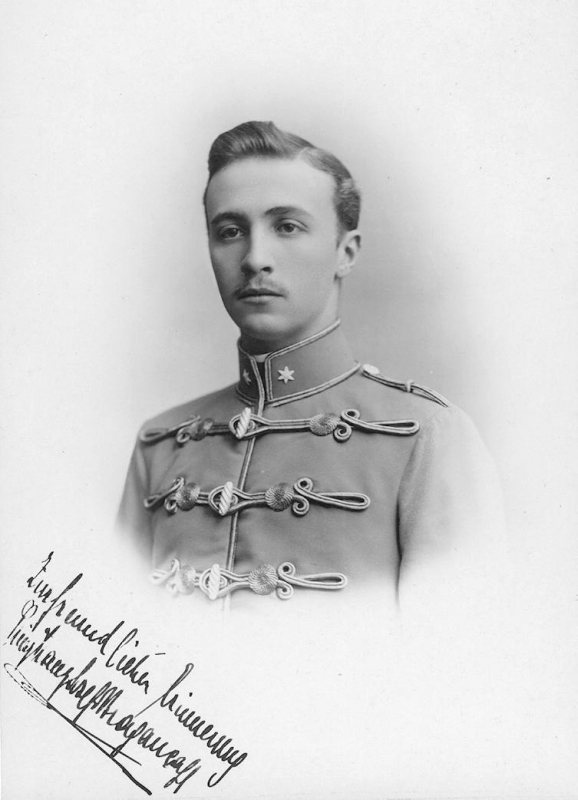
Prince Fransisco José of Bragança

- July 1 – Léon Jouhaux, French labour leader, recipient of the Nobel Peace Prize (d. 1954)
- July 5
  - Wanda Landowska, Polish harpsichordist, musicologist (d. 1959)
  - José Millán-Astray, Spanish general, founder of the Spanish Legion (d. 1954)
- July 9 – Ottorino Respighi, Italian composer, musicologist and conductor (d. 1936)
- July 15 – Joseph Campbell, Irish poet, lyricist (d. 1944)
- July 22 – Janusz Korczak (pen-name of Henryk Goldszmit), Polish-Jewish children's author, pediatrician and child pedagogist (b. 1878 or 1879) (d. 1942)
- July 26 – Shunroku Hata, Japanese field marshal (d. 1962)
- July 28 – Lucy Burns, American women's rights campaigner (d. 1966)
- August 8
  - Hisaichi Terauchi, Japanese field marshal (d. 1946)
  - Emiliano Zapata, Mexican revolutionary (d. 1919)
- August 13 – John Ireland, English composer and organist (d. 1962)
- August 15 – Ethel Barrymore, American film and stage actress (d. 1959)
- August 21 – Claude Grahame-White, British aviation pioneer (d. 1959)
- August 23 – Yevgenia Bosch, Ukrainian politician (d. 1925)
- August 26 – Joe Jeanette, American boxer (d. 1958)
- August 30 – Fritzi Scheff, Viennese-born American actress and singer (d. 1954)
- August 31
  - Isidro Ayora, 22nd president of Ecuador (d. 1978)
  - Emperor Taishō, 123rd Emperor of Japan (d. 1926)
- September 6
  - Max Schreck, German actor (d. 1936)
  - Joseph Wirth, Chancellor of Germany (d. 1956)
- September 7 – Francisco José of Bragança, exiled member of the Miguelist branch of the House of Bragança and officer in the Austro-Hungarian army (died 1919)
- September 14 – Margaret Sanger, American birth control advocate (d. 1966)
- September 15 – Joseph Lyons, 10th Prime Minister of Australia, Premier of Tasmania (d. 1939)
- September 20 – Victor Sjöström, Swedish film actor, director (d. 1960)
- September 25
  - Shinobu Ishihara, Japanese ophthalmologist and professor (d. 1963)
  - Lope K. Santos, Filipino writer and grammarian (d. 1963)
- September 27
  - Hans Hahn, Austrian mathematician (d. 1934)
  - Cyril Scott, English composer and writer (d. 1970)

=== October–December ===
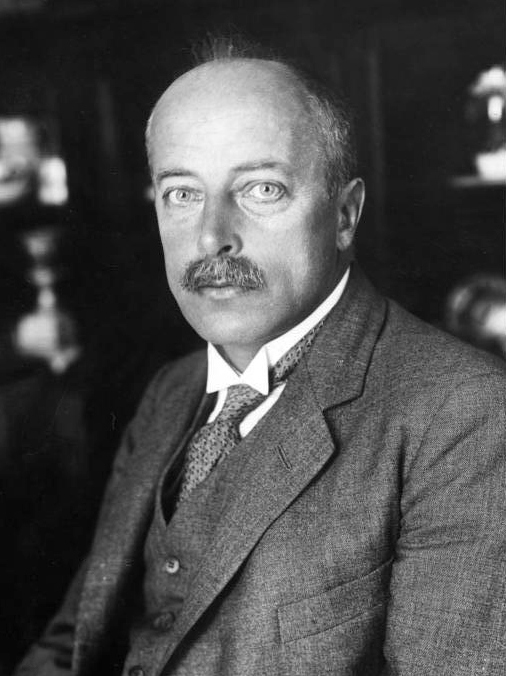
Max von Laue

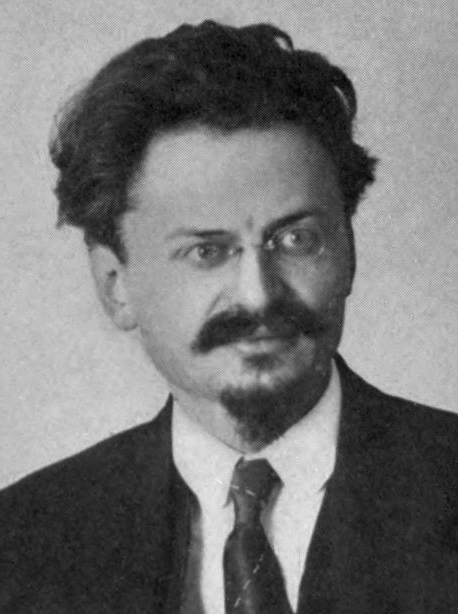
Leon Trotsky

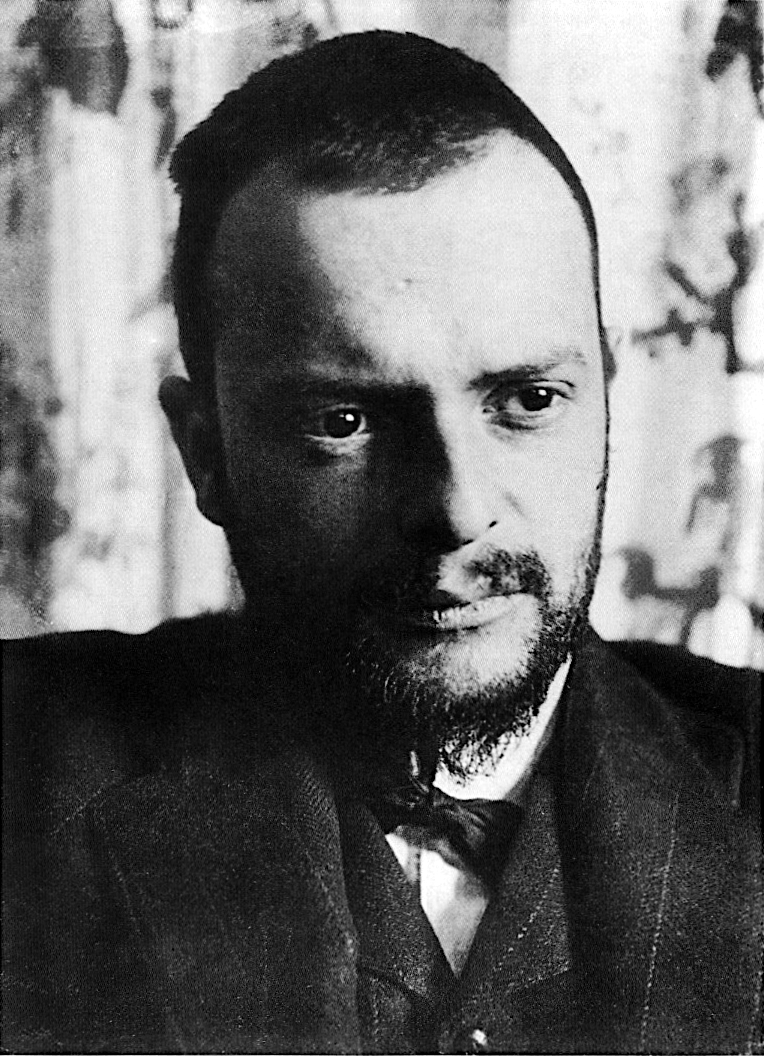
Paul Klee

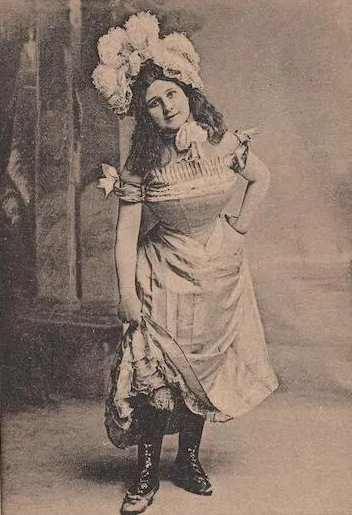
Prudencia Grifell

- October 2 – Wallace Stevens, American poet (d. 1955)
- October 3 – Warner Oland, Swedish-born American actor (d. 1938)
- October 5 – Francis Peyton Rous, American pathologist, recipient of the Nobel Prize in Physiology or Medicine (d. 1970)
- October 9 – Max von Laue, German physicist, Nobel Prize laureate (d. 1960)
- October 15 – Jane Darwell, American actress (d. 1967)
- October 18 – Giovanni Marinelli, Italian Fascist political leader (d. 1944)
- October 21
  - Joseph Canteloube, French composer, singer (d. 1957)
  - Eugene Burton Ely, American pioneer aviator (d. 1911)
- October 25 – Fritz Haarmann, German serial killer (d. 1925)
- October 29 – Franz von Papen, German diplomat and politician; Chancellor (1932) and Vice-Chancellor (1933–34; under Adolf Hitler) (d. 1969)
- November 1 – Pál Teleki, 2-time prime minister of Hungary (d. 1941)
- November 4 – Will Rogers, Native American humorist (d. 1935)
- November 7 – Leon Trotsky, Russian revolutionary (d. 1940)
- November 9 – S. O. Davies, oldest post-war British MP (d. 1972)
- November 10
  - Vachel Lindsay, American poet (d. 1931)
  - Patrick Pearse, Irish rebel leader (d. 1916)
- November 15 – Lewis Stone, American stage, film actor, known for playing Judge Hardy (d. 1953)
- November 21 – Marie Köstler, Austrian nurse, trade unionist and politician (d. 1965)
- December 4 – Nagai Kafu, Japanese writer (d. 1959)
- December 5 – Clyde Cessna, American aviator, aircraft designer, manufacturer (d. 1954)
- December 10 – E. H. Shepard, English artist, book illustrator (d. 1976)
- December 12 – Laura Hope Crews, American film, stage actress (d. 1942)
- December 18 – Paul Klee, Swiss artist (d. 1940)
- December 20 – Ion G. Duca, 35th prime minister of Romania (d. 1933)
- December 27
  - Prudencia Grifell, Spanish-born Mexican actress (d. 1970)
  - Sydney Greenstreet, British-born American film, stage actor (d. 1954)
- December 28 – Billy Mitchell, U.S. general, military aviation pioneer (d. 1936)
- December 29 – Florence Mary Taylor, Australia's first female architect (d. 1969)
- December 30 – Ramana Maharshi, Indian sage, jivanmukta (d. 1950)

=== Date unknown ===
- Abdallah Beyhum, 10th prime minister of Lebanon (d. 1962)
- Ali Muhammad Shibli, Bengali revolutionary (d. unknown)

== Deaths ==
=== January–June ===
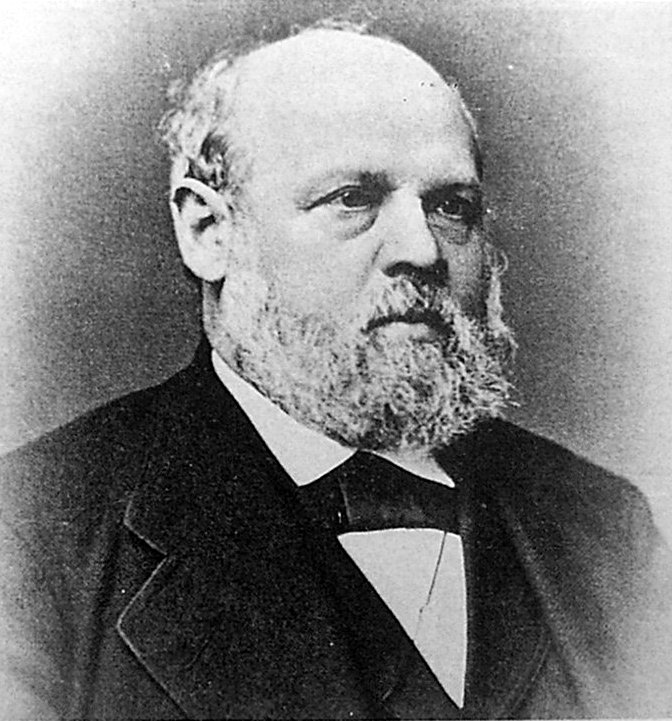
Heinrich Geissler

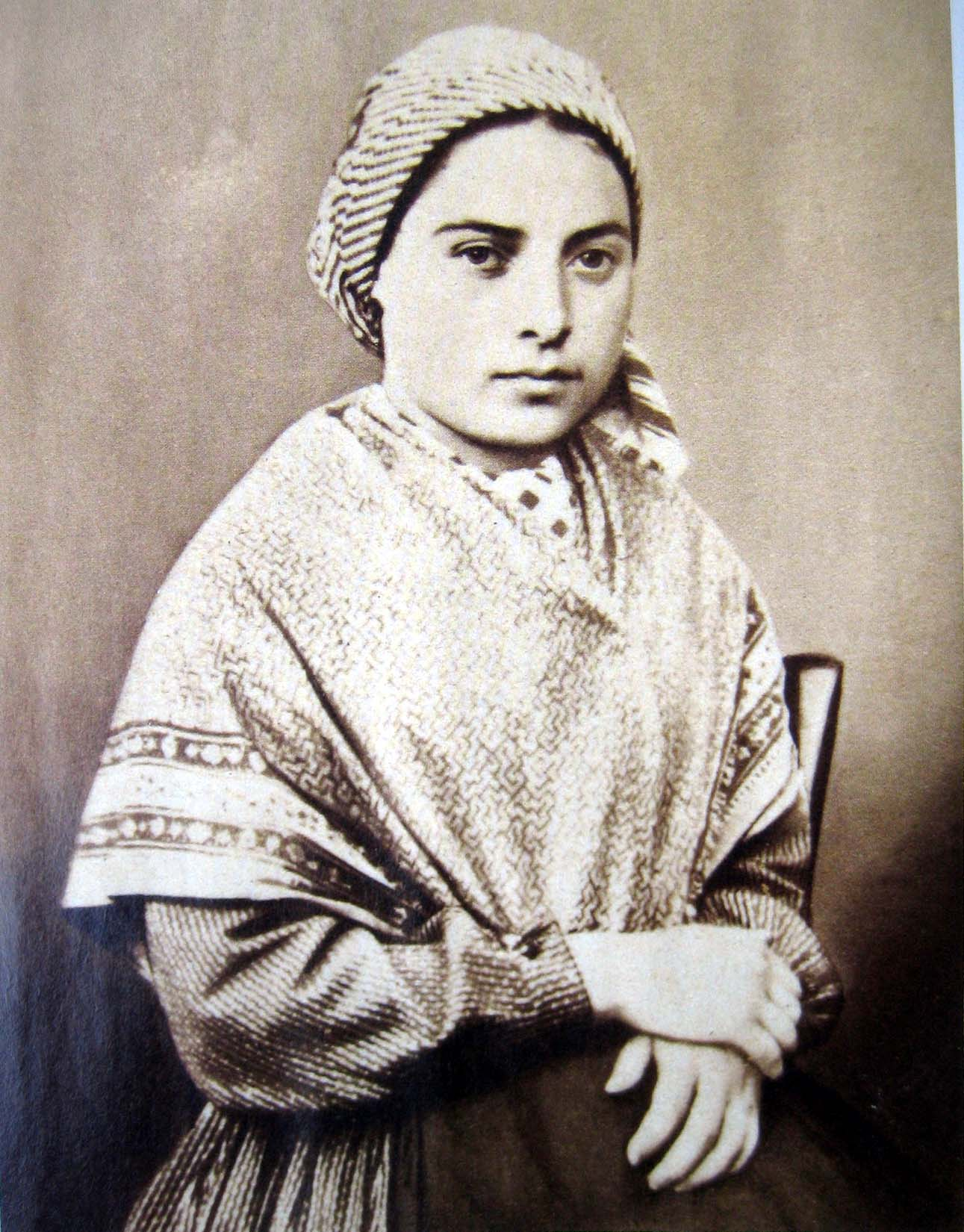
Saint Bernadette Soubirous

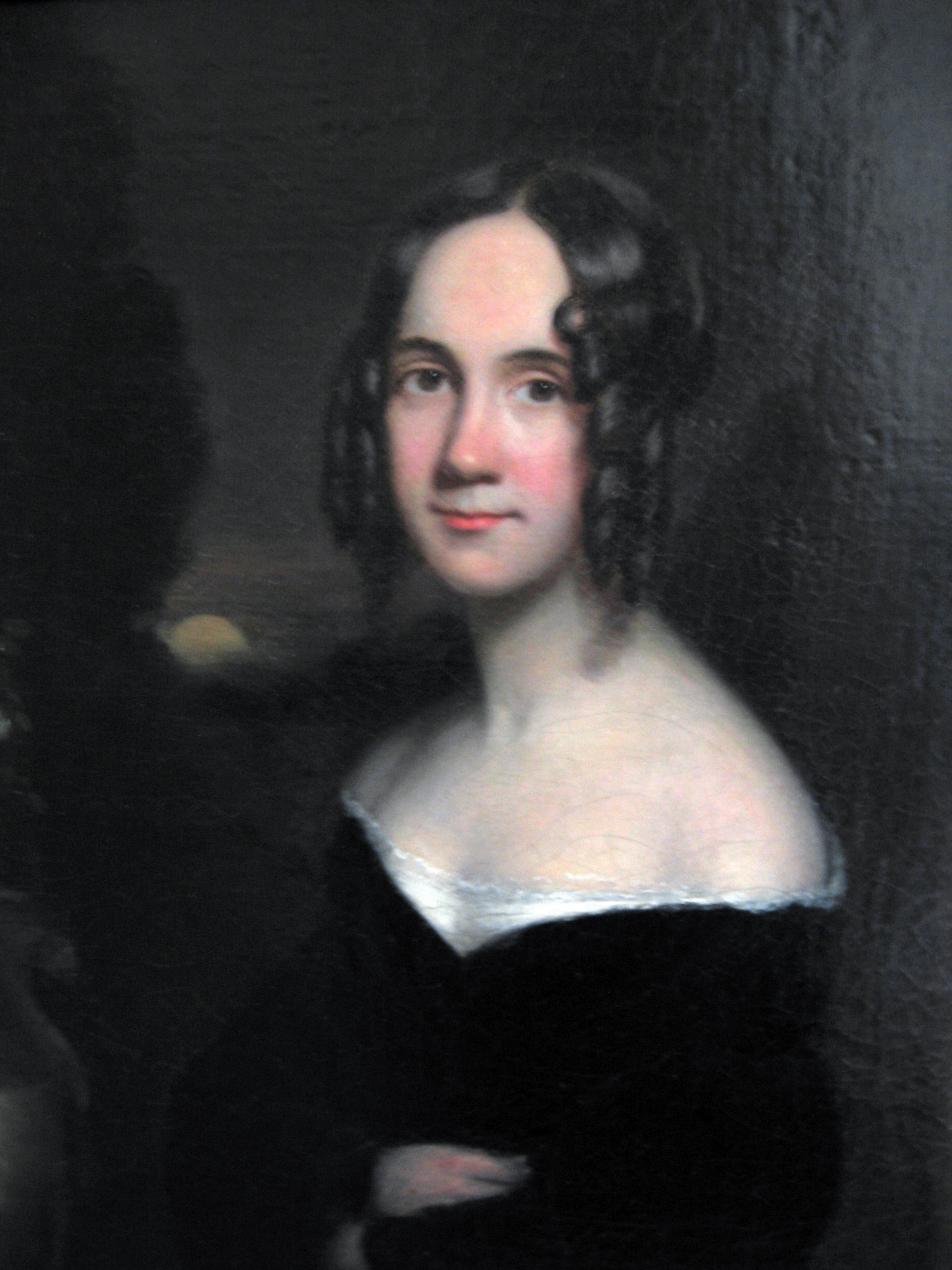
Sarah Hale

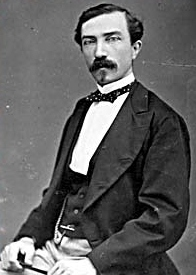
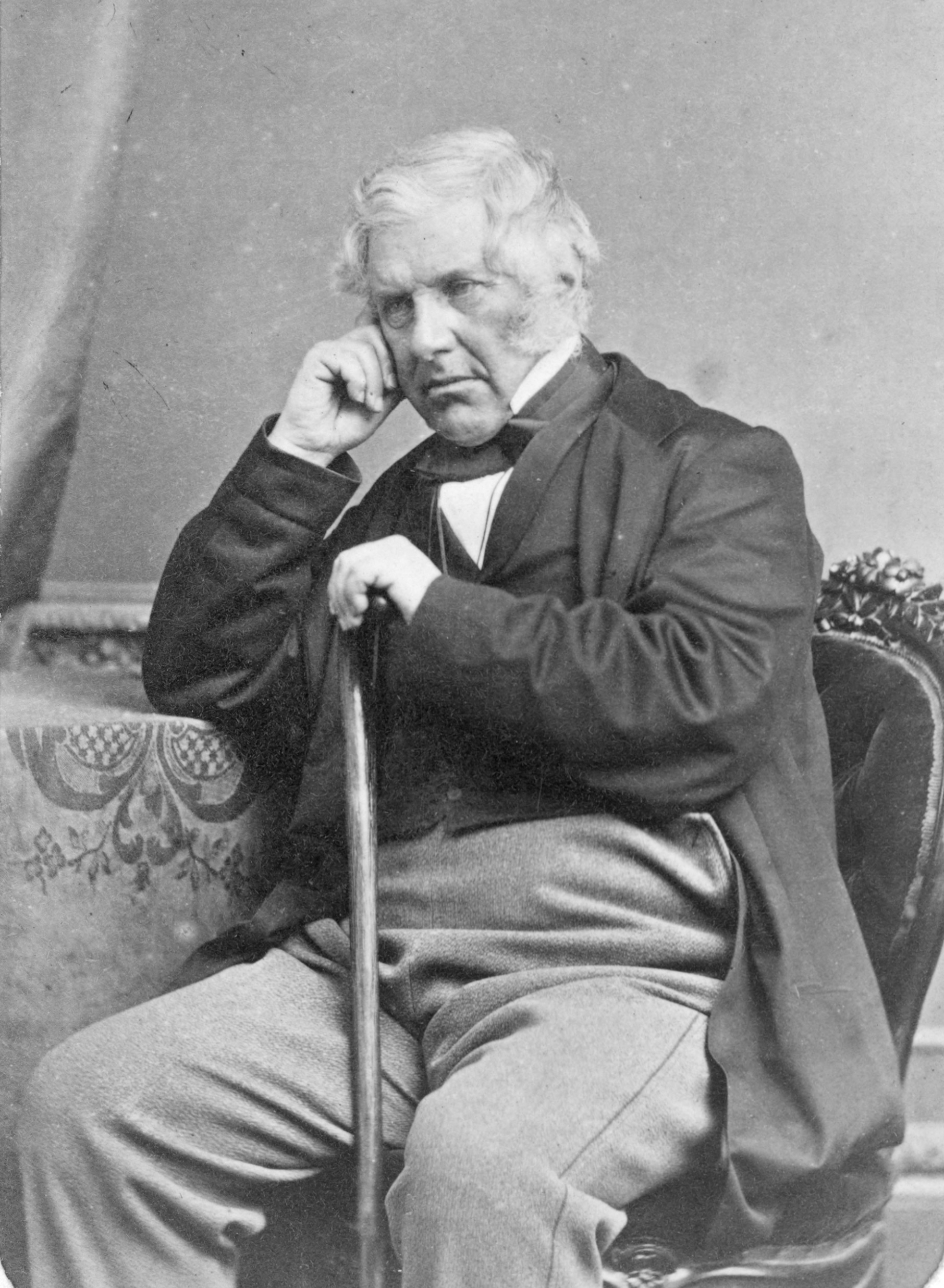
Epameinondas Deligeorgis and Henry Sewell died on May 14, 1879
- January 8 – Baldomero Espartero, Spanish general, regent and Prime Minister (b. 1793)
- January 24 – Heinrich Geißler, German physicist (b. 1814)
- January 26 – John Cadwalader, American jurist and politician (b. 1805)
- January 28 – Hugh M'Neile, Irish-born English Anglican priest. (b. 1795)
- February 11 – Honoré Daumier, French caricaturist and painter (b. 1808)
- February 21 – Sher Ali Khan, ruler of Afghanistan (b. 1825)
- February 23 – Albrecht Graf von Roon, Prime Minister of Prussia (b. 1803)
- February 28 – Hortense Allart, French writer (b. 1801)
- March 1 – Joachim Heer, Swiss politician (b. 1825)
- March 2 – John Eberhard Faber, German-born American pencil manufacturer (b. 1822)
- March 3 – William Kingdon Clifford, English mathematician and philosopher (b. 1845)
- March 10 – Prince Paul of Thurn and Taxis, German prince (b. 1843)
- March 22 – Sir John Woodford, British army general and archaeologist (b. 1785)
- March 24 – Juan Antonio Pezet, Peruvian general and politician, President of Peru (b. 1809)
- March 27
  - Hércules Florence, Brazilian photographer (b. 1804)
  - Prince Waldemar of Prussia (b. 1868)
- March 29 – Chō Kōran, Japanese poet, painter (b. 1804)
- March 30 – Thomas Couture, French painter and teacher (b. 1815)
- April 12 – Richard Taylor, American Confederate general (b. 1826)
- April 16 – Bernadette Soubirous, French Roman Catholic saint (b. 1844)
- April 19 – Clara Rousby, English actress (b. 1848)
- April 23 – Elisabetta Fiorini Mazzanti, Italian botanist (b. 1799)
- April 30 – Sarah Josepha Hale, American author (b. 1788)
- May 5 – Félix Douay, French general (b. 1816)
- May 14
  - Epameinondas Deligeorgis, Greek politician, 20th Prime Minister of Greece (b. 1829)
  - Henry Sewell, New Zealand politician, 1st Premier of New Zealand (b. 1807)
- May 15
  - Gottfried Semper, German architect (b. 1803)
  - George Fife Angas, English coachbuilder, businessman and politician, founder of South Australia (b. 1789)
- May 21 – Arturo Prat, Chilean lawyer and navy officer (b. 1848)
- May 24 – William Lloyd Garrison, American abolitionist, journalist, suffragist, and social reformer (b. 1805)
- June 1 – Napoléon, Prince Imperial, son of French Emperor Napoleon III (b. 1856)
- June 3 – Frances Ridley Havergal, English religious poet (b. 1836)
- June 7 – William Tilbury Fox, English dermatologist (b. 1836)
- June 11 – William, Prince of Orange, heir to Dutch throne (b. 1840)

=== July–December ===
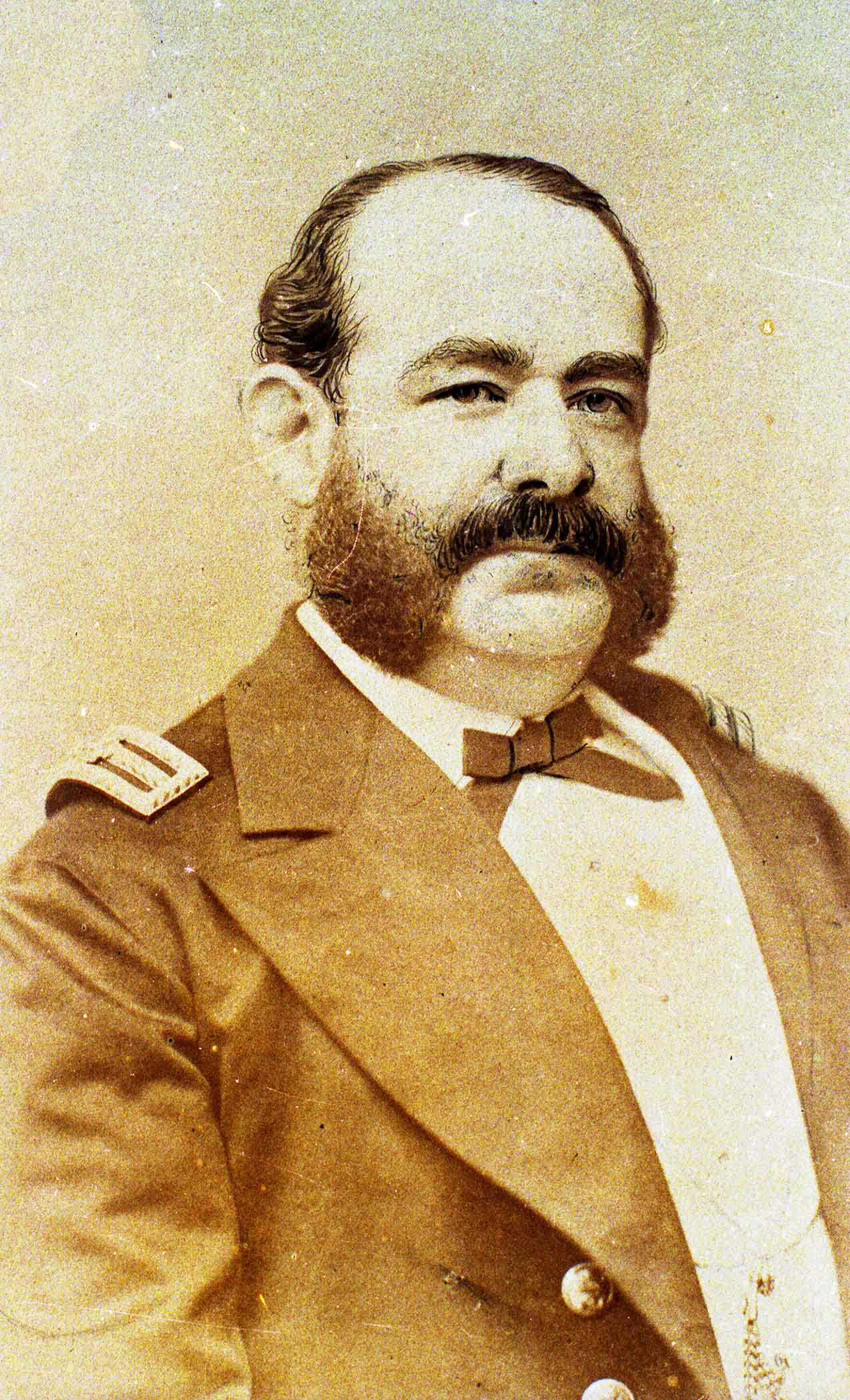
Miguel Grau

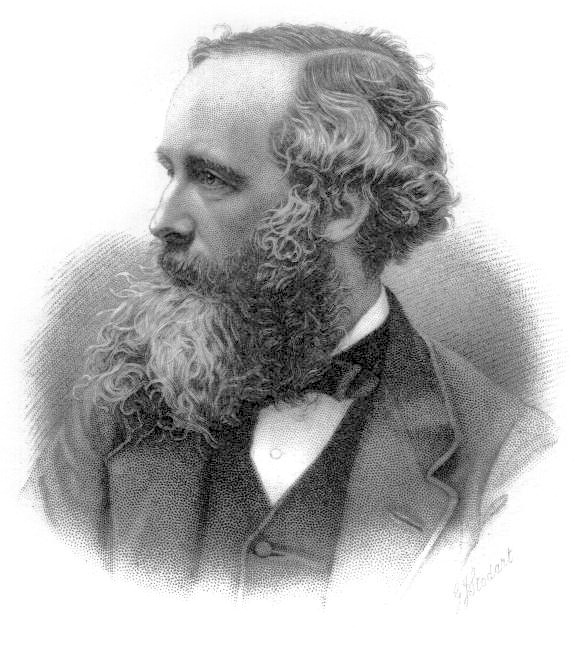
James Clerk Maxwell

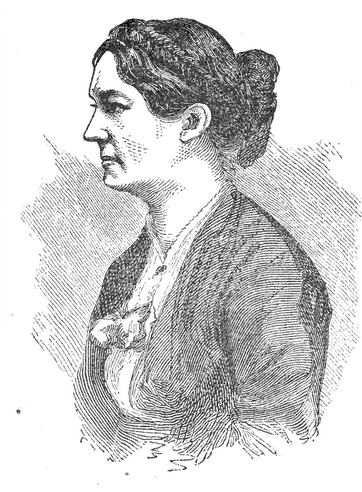
Louisa McCord

- July 7 – Béla Wenckheim, 8th prime minister of Hungary (b. 1811)
- July 17 – Maurycy Gottlieb, Polish painter (b. 1856)
- July 19 – Louis Favre, French engineer (b. 1826)
- August 14 – Ivan Davidovich Lazarev, Russian general (b. 1820)
- August 27 – Anđeo Kraljević, Herzegovinian Catholic bishop (b. 1807)
- August 30 – John Bell Hood, American Confederate general (b. 1831)
- September 9 – John Dennis Phelan, American politician and jurist (b. 1809)
- September 17 – Eugène Viollet-le-Duc, French architect (b. 1814)
- September 26 – Sir William Rowan, British field marshal (b. 1789)
- September 30 – Francis Gillette, American politician (b. 1807)
- October 8 – Miguel Grau Seminario, Peruvian admiral (killed in action) (b. 1834)
- October 25 – Nachum Kaplan, Lithuanian rabbi (b. 1811)
- October 31 – Joseph Hooker, American general (b. 1814)
- November 5 – James Clerk Maxwell, Scottish physicist (b. 1831)
- November 23 – Louisa Susannah Cheves McCord, American political essayist (b. 1810)
- December 2 – Ferdinand Lindheimer, German-born botanist (b. 1801)
- December 7 – Jón Sigurðsson, campaigner for Icelandic independence (b. 1811)
- December 24 – Anna Bochkoltz, German operatic soprano, voice teacher and composer (b. 1815)

=== Date unknown ===
- Joseph Welland, Irish missionary and Reverend (b. 1834)

== Further reading and year books ==
- Appletons' annual cyclopædia and register of important events of the year 1879 online
