= 2017 Surigao earthquake =

Earthquake in the Philippines

- Location within Mindanao Location within Philippines
- UTC time: 2017-02-10 14:03:43
- ISC event: 610208008
- USGS-ANSS: ComCat
- Local date: February 10, 2017
- Local time: 22:03:42 PST
- Magnitude: 6.7 M_{s} 6.5 M_{w}
- Depth: 15.0 km (9.3 mi)
- Epicenter: 9.907°N 125.452°E
- Areas affected: Surigao City; Basilisa, Dinagat Islands
- Total damage: ₱665 million+
- Max. intensity: MMI VIII (PEIS VIII)
- Tsunami: No
- Aftershocks: at least 140
- Casualties: 8 dead 200 injured

The 2017 Surigao earthquake occurred on February 10, 2017, at 10:03 PM (PST), with a surface-wave magnitude of 6.7 off the coast of Surigao del Norte in the Philippines. According to the PHIVOLCS earthquake intensity scale the earthquake was an Intensity VII (Destructive) earthquake at maximum. In the past Surigao province has been hit by a magnitude 7.2 tremor in both 1879 and 1893.

== Tectonic setting ==
The Philippine Islands is situated in a highly deformed zone between the convergent boundary of the Eurasian and Philippine Sea plates, known as the Philippine Mobile Belt. Along the east, the Philippine Sea plate subducts beneath the islands at the Philippine and East Luzon trenches. Major subduction complexes are also active along the southwestern coast of Mindanao at the Cotabato Trench and along the Manila Trench of the west Luzon.

Running through the Philippine Mobile Belt is the Philippine fault system; a large 1,200-kilometer-long, highly segmented strike-slip fault system. This left-lateral system of faults runs from southeastern Mindanao to northwestern Luzon. Strike-slip deformation within the Philippine Mobile Belt occurs as a result of oblique subduction of the Philippine Sea plate, where the Philippine Fault System accommodates much of it. The fault is seismically active and ruptures periodically in large earthquakes. Among the largest are the 1990 Luzon and 1973 Ragay Gulf earthquakes.

== Earthquake ==
The earthquake was recorded by the Philippine Institute of Volcanology and Seismology (PHIVOLCS) on February 10, 2017, at 10:03:42 PM (UTC+8). According to PHIVOLCS, the epicenter of the 6.7 magnitude-earthquake was at 9.80°N 125.35°E or 16 kilometers, north west of Surigao City. The earthquake was tectonic of origin. The most affected area in terms of the PHIVOLCS earthquake intensity scale was Surigao City, which experienced an intensity of Intensity VII (Destructive). The United States Geological Survey reported the earthquake as having a moment magnitude of 6.5.

Mainshock (Magnitude 6.7)
Intensity Scale	Location
VII	Surigao City; San Francisco, Surigao Del Norte
VI	Pintuyan, Southern Leyte.
V	Mandaue City, San Ricardo, Limasawa and San Francisco, Southern Leyte.
IV	Hinunangan, Southern Leyte and Butuan City.
III	Hibok-hibok, Camiguin, Tolosa and Tacloban, Leyte, Bislig City, Gingoog City, Misamis Oriental.
II	Cagayan de Oro City, Talocogon, Agusan del Sur, Dumaguete City, Cebu City

Aftershock (Magnitude 5.9)
Intensity Scale	Location
VI	Surigao City
IV	Limasawa and San Ricardo, Southern Leyte
III	San Juan and San Francisco, Southern Leyte
II	Gen. Luna, Surigao Del Norte; Ormoc City
Instrumental Intensities
VII	Surigao City
I	Borongan, Eastern Samar; Palo, Leyte

The Pacific Tsunami Warning Center issued no tsunami warning following the earthquake.

== Impact ==
According to the Department of Social Welfare and Development, at least 522 houses in Surigao del Norte were destroyed and 10,351 others were damaged following the earthquake. Seven bridges collapsed, isolating San Francisco. At least eleven towns were affected, experiencing power outages.

The Provincial Disaster Risk Reduction and Management Council of Surigao del Norte projected that the cost of damage to property and infrastructure was at least ₱665 million.

Eight people died in the earthquake while 202 others were injured.

== Aftermath ==
On February 11, 2017, the government of Surigao City declared a state of calamity.

The Civil Aviation Authority of the Philippines suspended all flights to and from Surigao City due to the damage sustained by the city's airport runway.

The Philippine national government, through presidential spokesman Ernesto Abella, assured the public that the government would provide aid.

By the afternoon of February 14, 2017, there were at least 140 reported aftershocks recorded by PHIVOLCS.

On March 5, 2017, an aftershock of magnitude 5.9 occurred; one person died of a heart attack, and 29 others were injured, while some walls collapsed.

== See also ==
- December 2023 Mindanao earthquake
- List of earthquakes in the Philippines
- List of earthquakes in 2017
