= Surigao =

Surigao (Tagalog pronunciation: [sʊɾɪˈɡaʊ]) may refer to:

- Surigao (province), a former province of the Philippines (1901–1960) currently partitioned into three provinces:
  - Surigao del Norte
  - Surigao del Sur
  - Dinagat Islands
- Surigao City, capital city of Surigao del Norte
- Diocese of Surigao, a Latin Church diocese covering Surigao del Norte and Dinagat Islands
- Surigao Strait, a strait in the southern Philippines
- Surigao Airport (IATA: SUG), serving Surigao City and Surigao del Norte

== See also ==
- Surigaonon (disambiguation)
  - Surigaonon language, sometimes known as Surigao language
  - Surigaonon people, sometimes known as Surigaos
