= Joseph Welland (architect) =

Irish architect (1798-1860)

- Born: 6 May 1798; Midleton, County Cork
- Died: 6 March 1860 (aged 61); Dublin, Ireland
- Occupation: Architect
- Known for: building Church of Ireland churches
- Family: William Joseph Welland (son)

Joseph Welland (6 May 1798 – 6 March 1860), born in Midleton, County Cork in Ireland, was an architect for the Board of First Fruits and later the Ecclesiastical Commissioners of Ireland. He was a student to John Bowden, later becoming his assistant. He designed many churches and schools around Ireland.

== Career ==
While working with John Bowden with the Board of First Fruits, Welland shared some of Bowden's works. These include: St. Philip and St. James Church, Booterstown and St. Stephen's Church, Mount Street (The Pepper Canister), both of which Joseph Welland had to complete himself after Bowden's death in 1821.

Welland's other works included:

- Christ Church Delgany, County Wicklow, additions and renovation
- St. Philip and St. James Church, Booterstown (1821)
- St. Stephen's Church, Mount Street (The Pepper Canister) (1821)
- Court House Monaghan, County Monaghan, with John Bowden (1829)
- North Strand Church (1836)
- St Peter's Church, Ballymodan (1847)
- St John's Church of Ireland, Clondalkin, County Dublin, extensions to 1789 church (1854)
- St. James' Church, James's Street (1859)
- St Mary’s Church, Nenagh (1862)

== Personal life and death ==
Welland married Sophia Margaret Mills and together they had four children including

- Rev. Thomas James Welland (1830-1907), Bishop of Down, Connor and Dromore.
- William Joseph Welland (1832-1895) also designed churches, and worked for the Ecclesiastical Commissioners.
- Rev. Joseph Welland (1834-1879), a missionary to India and founder of the Welland School in Kolkata.

Joseph Welland died on 6 March 1860 and was buried in St George's churchyard, Dublin.
