= John Bowden (architect) =

Irish architect

- Died: 1822
- Occupation: Architect
- Known for: building many Church of Ireland churches

John Bowden (fl. 1798-died c. 1822) was an Irish neoclassical architect known for his churches and courthouses.

== Life ==
St Fiaac's Church, Clonegal (1818)

John Bowden was possibly born in Blessington, County Wicklow, with no records known of his family. From 1798 to 1801, he attended the Dublin Society's School of Architectural Drawing, winning premiums in 1799, 1801 (as 'John Boden', ex-pupil) and 1802. He served his apprenticeship with Sir Richard Morrison.

Though he lived in Dublin, he worked primarily in Ulster. He designed many churches, glebe houses and courthouses around the country including St. Stephen's Church of Ireland, Mount Street, Dublin. St Stephen's was completed by his student Joseph Welland after his death.

Bowden was a member of the Board of First Fruits of the Church of Ireland from 1813 to 1821, working as the board's appointed architect succeeding Francis Johnston. By 1818 he had also become architect to the Board of Education. In 1817 he entered the competition for the Wellington Testimonial in the Phoenix Park, Dublin.

He was considered to be one of the leading neoclassical architects in Ireland at the turn of the 19th century.

There are no known details of his personal life. Bowden died in 1821 or 1822.

== Selection of Works ==
- Foyle College, Derry, County Londonderry (1808–1814)
- St. George's Parish Church, Belfast (1811–1816)
- Antrim Castle, County Antrim (1813)
- Dundalk Courthouse, Dundalk, County Louth (1813–1818) supervisor
- St. Paul's Tartaraghan, Portadown, County Armagh (1816)
- Derry Courthouse, Derry, County Londonderry (1822)
- St Fiaac's Church, Clonegal (1818)
- Church of Ireland, County Cavan (1820)
- St. Cronan's Church, Roscrea (Church of Ireland)
- St. Stephen's Church of Ireland (Pepper Canister), Mount Street, Dublin (1821–1824) Designed by Bowden and completed by Welland
- St. Philip and St. James Church, Booterstown, Dublin (1821–1824) Designed by Bowden and completed by Welland
