= St. Paul's Cathedral Mission College =

College in Kolkata, West Bengal, India

St. Paul’s Cathedral Mission College
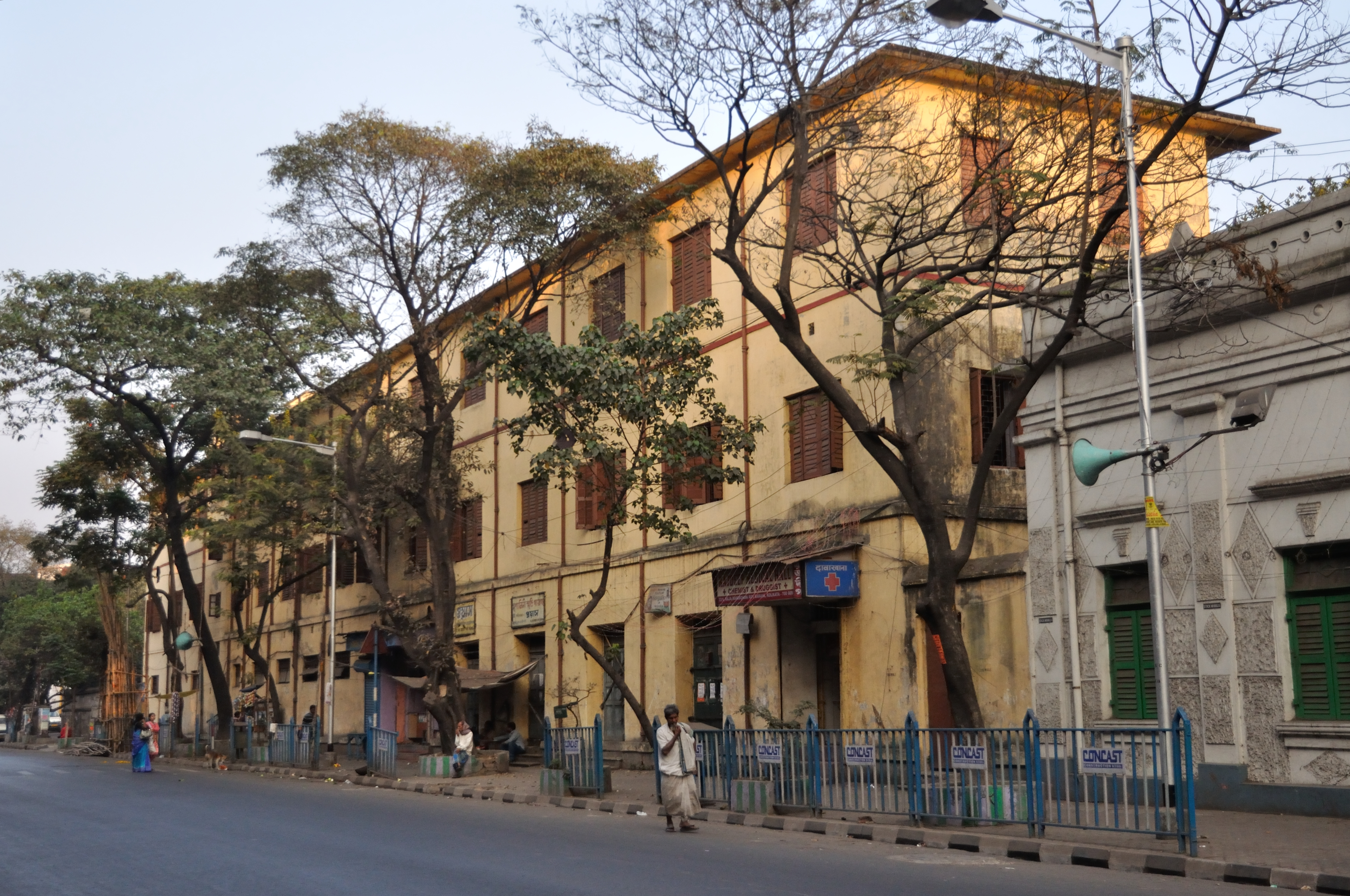
- St Paul's Cathedral Mission College in 2014
- Type: Educational Institution
- Established: 1864; 162 years ago
- Affiliations: University of Calcutta
- Principal: Dr. Sudipta Midday
- Location: 33/1 Raja Rammohan Roy Sarani, Amherst Street, Kolkata - 700009, Kolkata, West Bengal, India; 22.5757388°N 88.3693526°E
- Campus: Urban
- Website: www.spcmc.ac.in

St. Paul's Cathedral Mission College, popularly known as St. Paul's College, is an undergraduate liberal arts and sciences college in Kolkata, India. Recently, post-graduate in English literature has been introduced. It is affiliated with the University of Calcutta. The college is recognized by the University Grants Commission (UGC). Recently, it has been re-accredited and awarded 'B' grade by the National Assessment and Accreditation Council (NAAC).

The College was founded as the Cathedral Mission College of the Church Missionary Society in 1865 with John Barton as the first Principal. Early lectures were provided by Joseph Welland, EP Greaves, and S Dyson.

== Notable alumni ==
Intermediate Alumni:

- Tarun Majumdar, Padma Shri Winner Filmmaker, Documentary Filmmaker, Illustrator, Screenplay Writer
- Mani Kumar Chetri, Doctor
- Bishnu Prasad Rabha, cultural figure from Assam and Communist activist
- Rishang Keishing, Minister of India

Graduate Alumni:

- Bipin Chandra Pal, Freedom Fighter
- Radharaman Mitra, Nationalist
- Anandamoy Bhattacharjee, Chief justice
- Nisith Ranjan Ray, Historian, Social Activist and Academic
- Nirendranath Chakravarty, Poet, Novelist, Journalist
- Bishnu Dey, Poet, writer and Academic
- Sunirmal Basu, Poet, Short story writer

== See also ==
- St. Paul's Cathedral, Kolkata
- List of colleges affiliated to the University of Calcutta
- Education in India
- Education in West Bengal
