= 1879 Surigao earthquake =

Earthquake in the Philippines

- UTC time: 1879-06-29
- Local date: June 30, 1879
- Local time: 02:55 PST
- Magnitude: 7.4 M_{w}
- Epicenter: 9.8°N 125.5°E
- Type: Strike-slip
- Areas affected: Philippine
- Max. intensity: MMI X (Extreme)

The 1879 Surigao earthquake occurred on June 30 at 02:55 local time on the northeastern tip of Mindanao. The earthquake with a moment magnitude (M_{w}) of 7.4 struck with an epicenter just south of Lake Mainit. Extensive damage occurred but there were no reports of casualties.

== Tectonic setting ==
The Philippine Islands is situated in a highly deformed zone between the convergent boundary of the Eurasian and Philippine Sea plates, known as the Philippine Mobile Belt. Along the east, the Philippine Sea Plate subducts beneath the islands at the Philippine and East Luzon trenches. Major subduction complexes are also active along the southwestern coast of Mindanao at the Cotabato Trench and along the Manila Trench of the west Luzon.

Running through the Philippine Mobile Belt is the Philippine Fault System; a 1,200-kilometer-long, highly segmented strike-slip fault system. This left-lateral system of faults runs from southeastern Mindanao to northwestern Luzon. Strike-slip deformation within the Philippine Mobile Belt occurs as a result of oblique subduction of the Philippine Sea Plate, where the Philippine Fault System accommodates much of it. The fault is seismically active and ruptures periodically in large earthquakes. Among the largest are the 1990 Luzon and 1973 Ragay Gulf earthquakes.

== Earthquake ==
The earthquake ruptured approximately 100 kilometers (62 mi) of the Philippine Fault System along the Surigao segment. The Surigao segment strikes in a slightly north-northeast orientation. Left-lateral stream offsets, and 1-meter-high (3.3 ft) scarps are evident that the fault is active. By studying the surface rupture length, a moment magnitude of 7.4 was estimated. The reassessed magnitude is significantly larger than the previous value of 6.9 by Bautista and Okie in 2000.

It resulted in extreme shaking within the meizoseismal area, later assigned X (Extreme) on the modified Mercalli intensity scale. Using aerial photographs, a fault scarp was identified running the length from the present-day San Francisco, Surigao del Norte to Lake Mainit. The fault scarp was associated with the 1879 surface rupture. A maximum slip of 5 meters (16 ft) occurred at the surface. Further paleoseismology studies and trenching also identified fault scarps south of the lake. At least three other surface rupturing earthquakes occurred in the same segment during the last 1,300 years.

== Impact ==
Nearly all concrete infrastructures in Surigao, San Francisco, and Butuan were demolished. Ground failure, liquefaction, and subsidence occurred. Strong aftershocks occurred immediately after the mainshock. Spanish geologist Jose Centeno, appointed by the Governor-General of the Philippines measured up to 50 cm of subsidence of the ground after the earthquake. He reported many homes and trees were severely damaged; only three stone structures remained standing. Of the three, two buildings; one housing the governor and the other an administration office, suffered cracks on the walls and upper floors. A church constructed of thick coral limestone and reinforced with timber was seriously damaged. Wood, nipa, and bamboo-constructed homes were destroyed. In San Francisco, 26 of the 40 homes collapsed. The remaining homes that did not collapse were tilted over and most were eventually demolished for new constructions. Two bridges were also destroyed.

== See also ==
- List of earthquakes in the Philippines
- 2017 Surigao earthquake
