= Mani Kumar Chetri =

Indian cardiologist (1920–2026)

- Born: 23 May 1920; Darjeeling, Bengal Presidency, British India
- Died: 5 April 2026 (aged 105); Kolkata, West Bengal, India
- Occupation: Cardiologist
- Parent(s): P. L. Singh Chettri; H. M. Chettri.
- Awards: Padma Shri

Mani Kumar Chetri (23 May 1920 – 5 April 2026) was an Indian cardiologist who was director of West Bengal State Health Services and a director of the IPGMER and SSKM Hospital, Kolkata. He was an elected fellow of the National Academy of Medical Sciences and a recipient of the fourth highest Indian civilian award of Padma Shri from the Government of India in 1974.

== Life and career ==
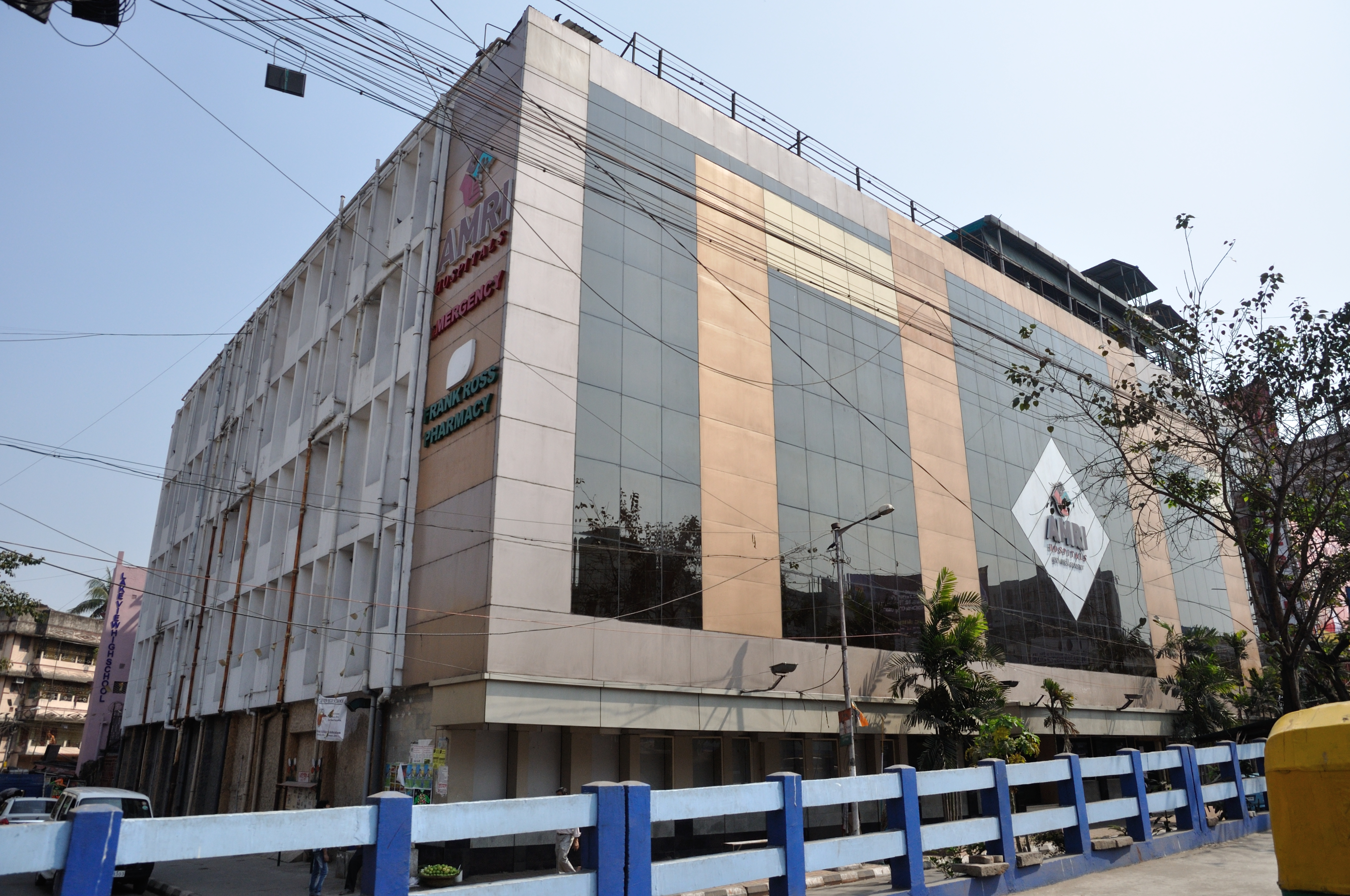
AMRI Hospital, Dhakuria

Mani Kumar Chetri was born on 23 May 1920 in Teesta Valley T.E., one of the oldest tea gardens situated on the banks of Teesta River in Darjeeling in Bengal Presidency, in a Gorkha family to P. L. Singh Chettri and H. M. Chettri. He did his early schooling at the Darjeeling Municipal Primary School and Turnbull High School and completed his matriculation from the Government High School, Darjeeling in 1936. After passing his intermediate examination from St. Paul's Cathedral Mission College, Kolkata, he secured a graduate degree in medicine (MBBS) from the Medical College and Hospital, Kolkata and the degree of FRCP from London on government scholarship in 1956.

He joined the IPGMER and SSKM Hospital in 1960 as the director and a professor of the department of cardiology. In 1976, he was appointed the Director of West Bengal Health Services in 1976 and served as the personal doctor of the then chief minister, Jyoti Basu. In 1997, when the Advanced Medical Research Institute was started in Dhakuria, Chetri was made the managing director, but he continued his association with IPGMER & SSKM Hospital as an adviser. The Government of India awarded him the civilian honour of Padma Shri in 1974.

Chetri died at his home in Kolkata, on 5 April 2026, at the age of 105. He had suffered a head injury from a fall 15 days earlier.
