= St Stephen's Church, Dublin =

Church in Ireland

St Stephen's Church
- Séipéal Naomh Stiofáin
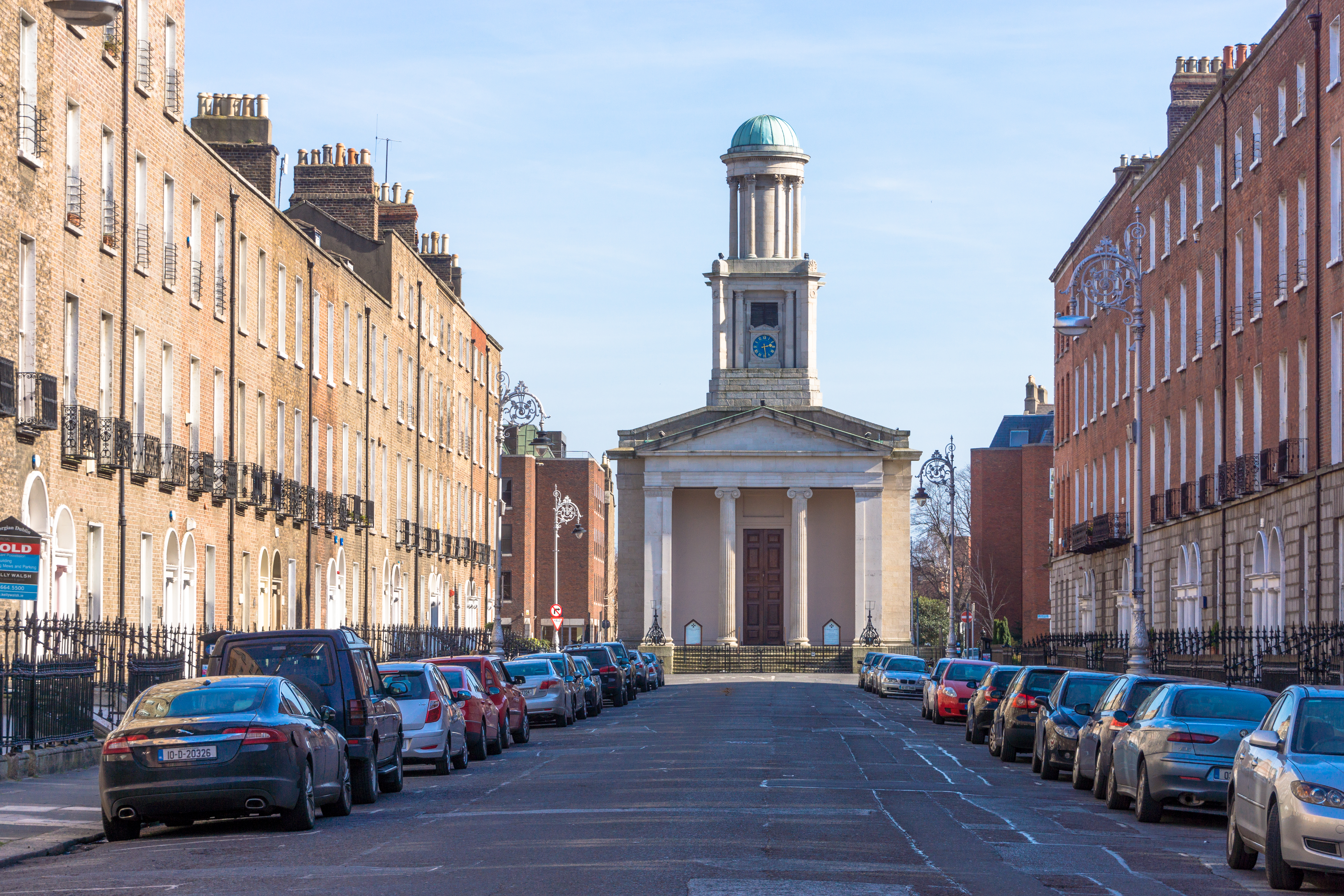
- A view of the church from Mount Street Upper
- Interactive map of the St Stephen's Church area
- Alternative names: The Pepper Canister

General information
- Type: House
- Architectural style: Georgian architecture
- Classification: Protected Structure
- Location: Mount Street Upper, Dublin 2, Dublin, Ireland
- Coordinates: 53.336833°N 6.2437575°W
- Elevation: 50 m (160 ft)
- Completed: 1821; 205 years ago

Height
- Height: 30 m (98 ft)

Technical details
- Material: calp limestone, Portland stone, granite

Design and construction
- Architects: John Bowden; Joseph Welland

St Stephen's Church, Dublin
- St Stephen's Church, Dublin

Administration
- Parish: St. Peter's Church, Aungier Street, Dublin

Saint Stephen's Church, popularly known as The Pepper Canister, is the formal Church of Ireland chapel-of-ease for the parish of the same name in Dublin, Ireland. The church is situated on Mount Street Upper. It was begun in 1821 by John Bowden and completed by Joseph Welland after the former's death. The nickname derives from the shape of the spire, resembling a pepper canister.

It was originally conceived as a chapel-of-ease for the parish of St Peter's, Aungier Street, which was the largest Church of Ireland parish in Dublin. In recent years, the church has become active both in faith activities and as a venue for musical and other events.

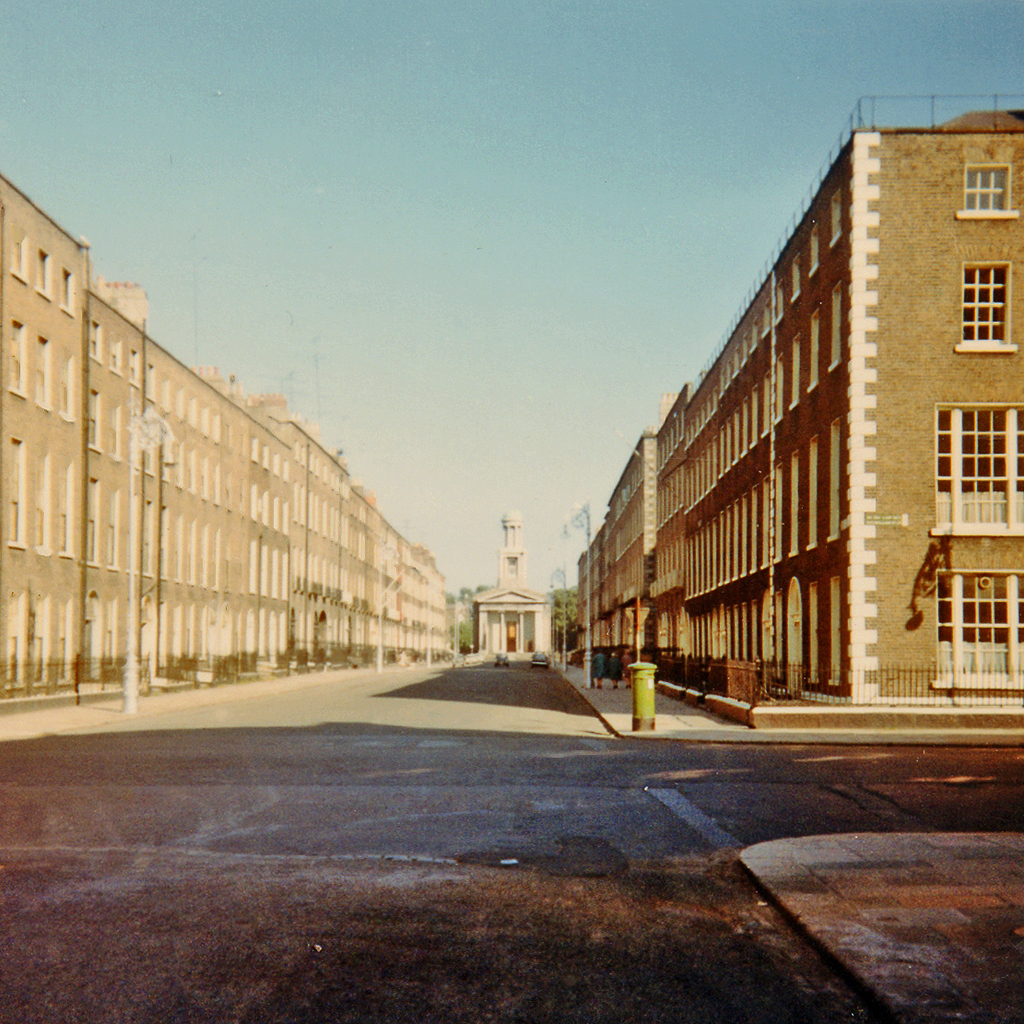
Mount Street Upper, August 1969
