= Bishop Street Courthouse =

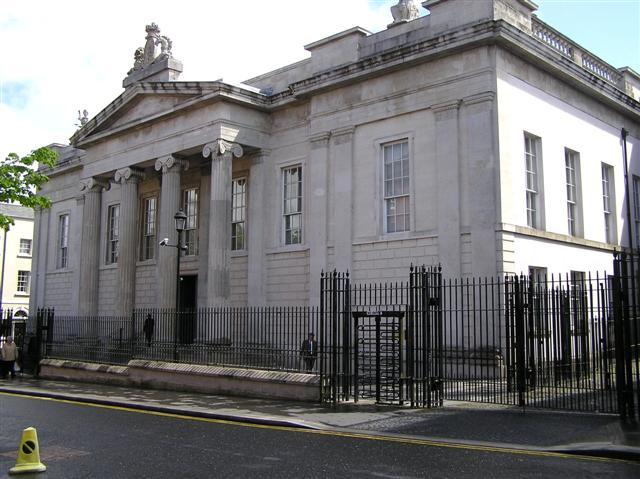
- Bishop Street Courthouse

- Shown in Northern Ireland
- 54.9939°N 7.3239°W
- Location: Derry, County Londonderry

History
- Built: 1822

Site notes
- Architect: John Bowden
- Architectural style: Neoclassical style

Listed Building – Grade A
- Official name: Courthouse, Bishop Street, Derry
- Designated: 25 May 1976
- Reference no.: HB 01/19/002

The Bishop Street Courthouse is a judicial facility in Bishop Street, Derry, County Londonderry, Northern Ireland. It is a Grade A listed building.

== History ==
The building, which was designed by John Bowden in the Neoclassical style, was first used in 1816, although it was not fully completed until 1817. The design involved a symmetrical main frontage facing the Bishop Street; the central section featured a tetrastyle portico with Ionic order columns supporting a frieze and a pediment. A carving depicting the Royal coat of arms was installed at the apex of the pediment and statues depicting Justice and Peace carved by Edward Smyth were erected above the end bays. Architectural critic, Ian Nairn, described it as "Derry's best Georgian building" in The Listener in December 1961, having regard to the high quality white sandstone which was brought locally from Dungiven to build it.

The building was originally used as a facility for dispensing justice but, following the implementation of the Local Government (Ireland) Act 1898, which established county councils in every county, the Bishop Street Courthouse was also used to discharge some county council functions.

On 25 January 1989, the Provisional IRA Derry Brigade exploded a 400lb van bomb outside the courthouse causing extensive damage.

In May 2012 the justice minister, David Ford, said that he accepted an inspection report recommending that the Enniskillen Courthouse should be designated a "super court" in a proposed rationalisation of the court system.

On 19 January 2019 there was a car bomb attack on the Bishop Street Courthouse initiated as part of a dissident Irish republican campaign, the first such attack in several years. There were no injuries from the attack but four men were subsequently arrested in relation to the incident. It led to concerns that former members of the Provisional IRA were constructing bombs for the dissidents.
