= Surigaonon =

Surigaonon may refer to:

- Surigaonon people, a people from the Surigao provinces of the Philippines
- Surigaonon language, their Austronesian language

== See also ==
- Surigao (disambiguation), a group of provinces in the Philippines
