= Sunirmal Basu =

Indian Poet (1902–1957)

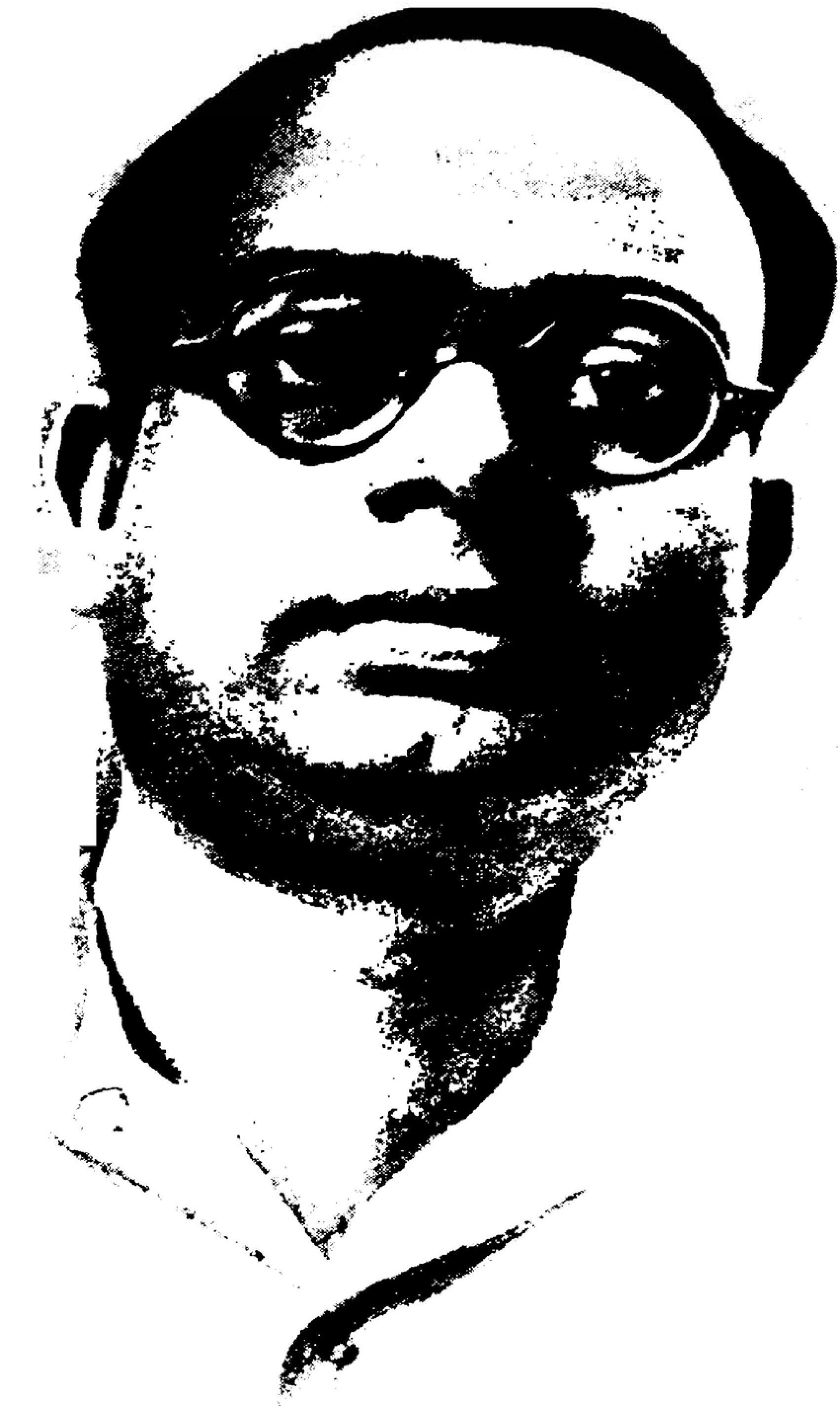
- Born: 20 July 1902; Giridih, Bengal Presidency, British Raj
- Died: 25 February 1957 (aged 54); Dhakuria, Calcutta, West Bengal, India
- Education: St. Paul's College, IndianSchool of Oriental Art
- Occupations: Poet; Novelist; Short Story Writer
- Spouse: Niharika Basu
- Children: Avik Basu
- Writing career
- Notable awards: Vidyasagar Puraskar; Bhubaneswari Devi Medal

Sunirmal Basu (20 July 1902 – 25 February 1957) was a Bengali writer, primarily known for his contributions to children's literature and poems. He became famous for his adventure and detective stories, which captivated specially young readers.

== Early life ==
He was born on July 20, 1902 (4th of Shravan in Bengali calendar month) in Giridih in Bihar.

== Education and career ==
Sunirmal Basu passed his matriculation examination in 1920 from Giridih High School, at his father's workplace in Patna. Later, he joined St. Paul's College, Calcutta, but left the college in 1921 after joining Gandhiji's Non-Cooperation Movement. Then he joined the Indian School of Oriental Art established by Abanindranath Tagore.

== List of works ==
- Hawar Dola (1927)
- Chanabara
- Bere Maja
- Hoi Choi
- Hulusthul
- Kathashekha
- Pattadi, Chander Tungtang (1930)
- Ananda Nadu
- Shuure Mama
- Kipate Thakurda (1933)
- Tuntunier Gaan
- Gujaber Janm
- Bir Shikari
- Lalon Fakirer Bhite
- Patabahar
- Intibintir Aasar (1950)
- Pahadere Jangale

He also wrote his autobiography Jibankhatar Keke Pata in 1955.

== Awards ==
He received the Bhuvaneshwari Medal in 1956.
