= Welland Gouldsmith School =

Location
- Plot No. 1, I/5, Block – E Baishnabghata, Patuli Township; Kolkata – 700 094 288 Bepin Behari Ganguly Street; Kolkata – 700 012; Kolkata, West Bengal; India

Information
- Type: Private
- Motto: "Nisi Dominus Frustra"
- Established: 1869
- Principal: Ms. J B Michael
- Staff: 60+
- Enrollment: Varies
- Campus: Urban
- Nickname: Wellandier
- Affiliations: Council for the Indian School Certificate Examinations
- Website: wgskolkata.com

Welland Gouldsmith School (WGS) is a primary, secondary and senior secondary school in Kolkata, West Bengal, India. WGS has two branches, one at Bowbazar and the other at Patuli. The Bowbazar branch was established in 1869 and the patuli branch in 2004. The Bowbazar branch is a girls' school while the Patuli branch is co-educational. Both of the schools are affiliated to the Council for the Indian School Certificate Examinations, New Delhi with I.C.S.E. at the class X level and I.S.C. at the class XII level comprising three streams viz. Science, Commerce, Humanities.

== History ==
Reverend Joseph Welland, of Trinity College, Dublin, was responsible for starting the Old Church Day School in 1876. The School moved into its premises in 1884.

In 1890, Reverend Herbert Gouldsmith M.A. Oxford took over the responsibility of the Old Mission Church. In November 1891 he began the Free Day School in addition to the Welland School for paying students.

In 1900, the school moved to 288 Bepin Behari Ganguly Street.

In 1936, the Welland School was combined with the Gouldsmith Free School to be called the Welland Gouldsmith School.

In the 1960s, the school was supported by United States food aid.
