= Surigao Airport =

Airport in Surigao City, Philippines

Surigao Airport Tugpahanan nan Surigao Tugpahanan sa Surigao Paliparan ng Surigao
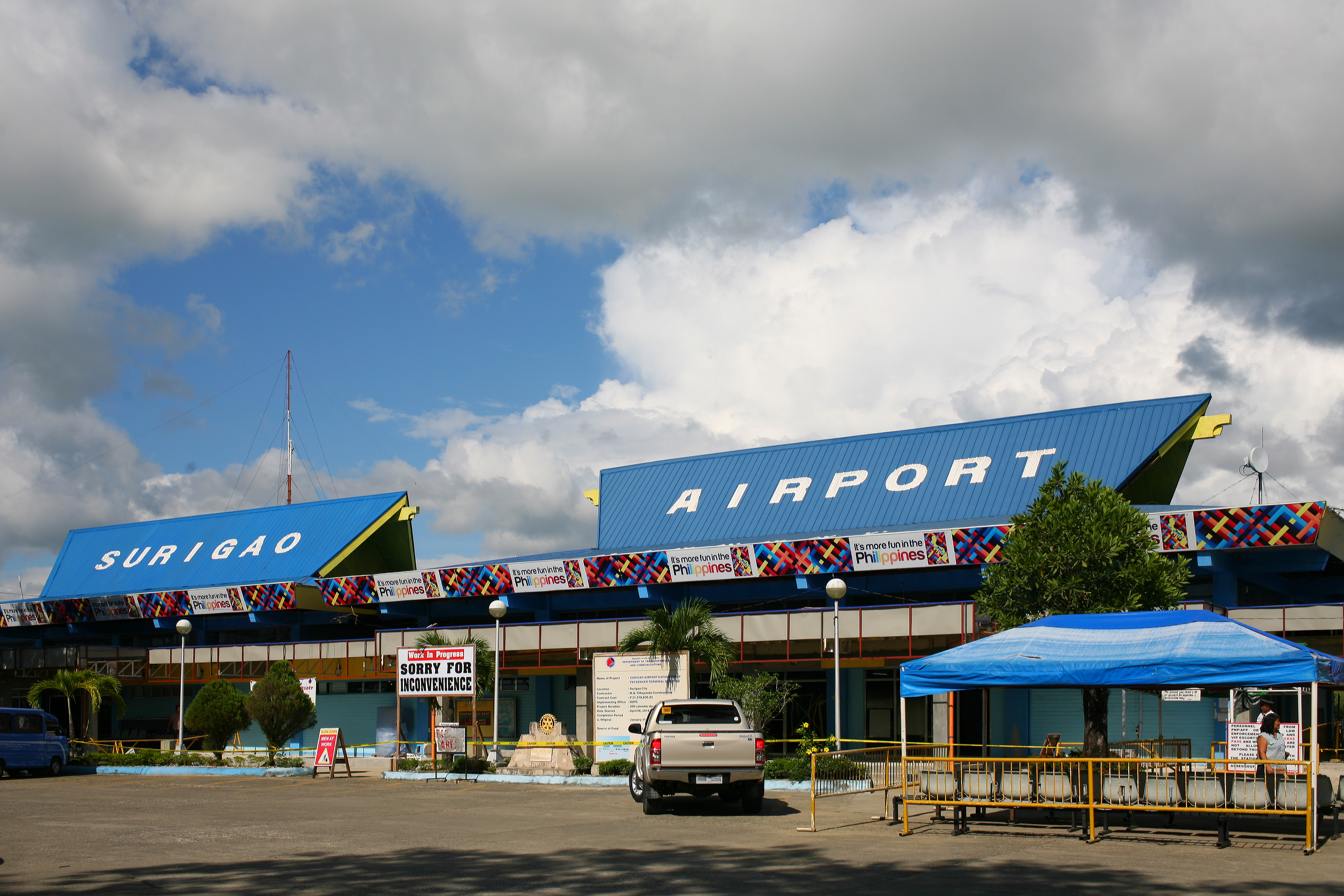
- IATA: SUG; ICAO: RPMS; WMO: 98653

Summary
- Airport type: Public
- Operator: Civil Aviation Authority of the Philippines
- Serves: Surigao City
- Location: Barangay Luna
- Elevation AMSL: 6 m / 20 ft
- Coordinates: 09°45′27″N 125°28′46″E

Map

Runways
Direction	Length		Surface
Direction	m	ft	Surface
18/36	1,708	5,604	Asphalt

Statistics (2022)
- Passengers: 37,583
- Aircraft movements: 658
- Tonnes of cargo: 2,146
- Statistics from the Civil Aviation Authority of the Philippines.

Surigao Airport (IATA: SUG, ICAO: RPMS) is an airport serving the general area of Surigao City, Philippines. Located in the Province of Surigao del Norte, the airport is classified as a Class 2 principal (minor domestic) airport by the Civil Aviation Authority of the Philippines, a body of the Department of Transportation that is responsible for the operations of not only this airport but also of all other airports in the Philippines except the major international airports.

== History ==
Surigao Airport experienced significant damage caused by the 2017 Surigao earthquake, and it was closed for two weeks for repairs. Cebgo and PAL Express, the two airlines serving the airport at the time, utilized Bancasi Airport in Butuan in the meantime. The airport reopened on 23 February 2017 with a limited runway capacity of 1,000 meters.

The work began on the runway's rehabilitation on August 7, 2019, with a completion target of November 2019 for the repair of the first 1,400 meters, with the remaining 300 meters repaired by February 2020. The runway's partial operation of 1,400 meters, up from 1,000 meters, can accommodate direct flights between Manila and Surigao.

The newly renovated and expanded Sayak Airport on Siargao Island has received the bulk of tourism flights since the 2017 earthquake, significantly reducing air traffic to and from this Mindanao mainland airport.

== Infrastructure ==
Surigao Airport has one runway that is designated 18/36 and measures 1,700 metres (5,600 ft).

== Airlines and destinations ==
As of April 2022, Cebgo is the only airline serving the airport. The airline flies from Mactan–Cebu International Airport.

The airport was formerly served by Asian Spirit until 2008, and PAL Express until 2018.

Airlines	Destinations
Cebgo	Cebu

== See also ==
- List of airports in the Philippines
