= San Francisco, Surigao del Norte =

Municipality in Surigao del Norte, Philippines

San Francisco Anao-aon
- Municipality
- Municipality of San Francisco
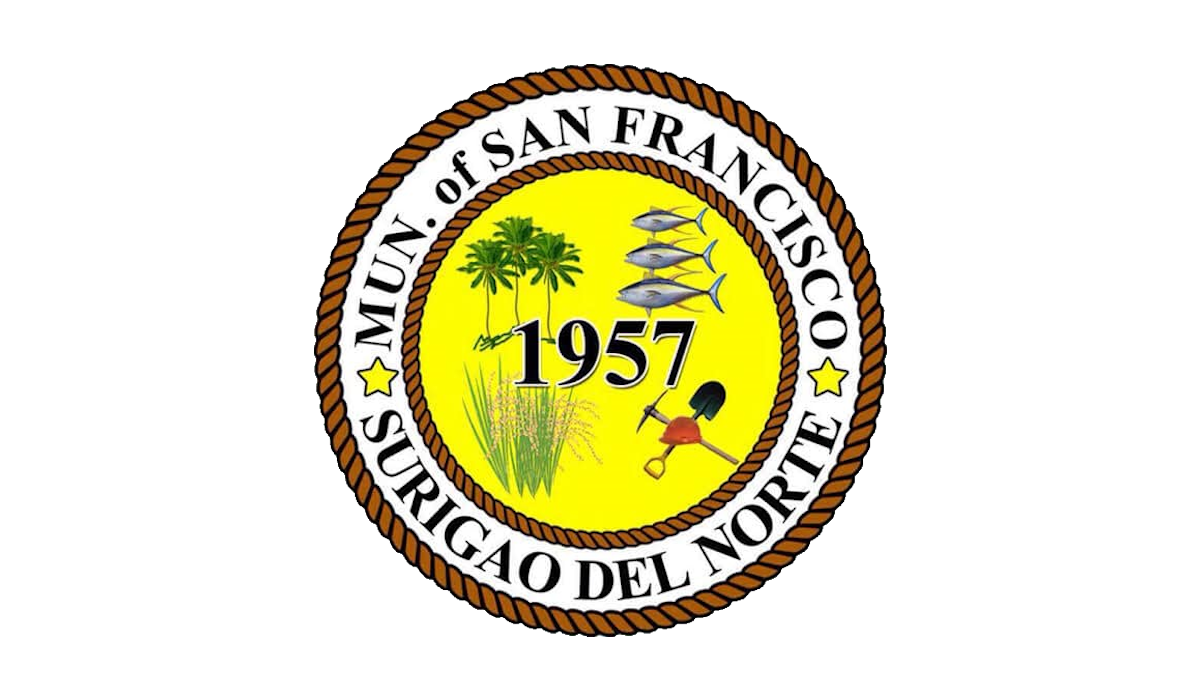
- Flag

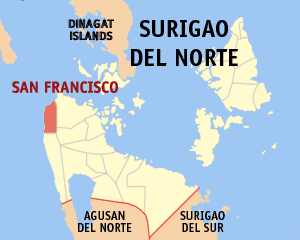
- Map of Surigao del Norte with San Francisco highlighted
- Interactive map of San Francisco
- Location within the Philippines
- Coordinates: 9°46′40″N 125°25′23″E
- Country: Philippines
- Region: Caraga
- Province: Surigao del Norte
- District: 2nd district
- Named for: St. Francis Xavier
- Barangays: 11 (see Barangays)

Government
  - Type: Sangguniang Bayan
  - Mayor: Val P. Pinat (NP)
  - Vice Mayor: Maria Luz B. Pinat (NP)
  - Representative: Bernadette S. Barbers (NP)
  - Municipal Council: Members: Florefel C. Bañacia (NP); Roche Jean O. Liberato (NP); Henry C. Japzon (NP); Vincent Eric Thomas K. Delani (NP); Rolando G. Baldecir (NP); Galelia D. Justiniane (NP); Amado C. Sajol Sr. (NP); Reneliza M. Erazo (NP)
  - Electorate: 14,451 voters (2025)

Area
  - Total: 56.72 km^{2} (21.90 sq mi)
- Elevation: 50 m (160 ft)
- Highest elevation: 425 m (1,394 ft)
- Lowest elevation: 0 m (0 ft)

Population (2024 census)
  - Total: 16,004
  - Density: 282.2/km^{2} (730.8/sq mi)
  - Households: 3,734

Economy
  - Income class: 4th municipal income class
  - Poverty incidence: 13.44% (2023)
  - Revenue: ₱ 107 million (2024)
  - Assets: ₱ 243.3 million (2024)
  - Expenditure: ₱ 85.99 million (2024)
  - Liabilities: ₱ 33.06 million (2024)

Service provider
  - Electricity: Surigao del Norte Electric Cooperative (SURNECO)
- Time zone: UTC+8 (PST)
- ZIP code: 8401
- PSGC: 1606719000
- IDD : area code: +63 (0)86
- Native languages: Surigaonon; Agusan; Cebuano; Tagalog

San Francisco, officially the Municipality of San Francisco (Surigaonon: Lungsod nan San Francisco; Tagalog: Bayan ng San Francisco), is a municipality in the province of Surigao del Norte, Philippines. According to the 2024 census, it has a population of 16,004 people.

== History ==
There has been many stories concerning the origin of the town but the most common is about the two lovers, Anao and Aon. Anao was a handsome, strong hunter who fell in love with Aon, the most beautiful woman and daughter of a powerful datu, who ruled the town, which was formerly a barangay. Anao and Aon vowed to be true to their love, despite the datu's objection. The datu wanted to break their love, however, he failed since the lovers were found dead near the riverbank in cold embrace. Thus, the name Anao-aon in memory of the two lovers.

Anao-aon became a pueblo after the abolition of the encomienda system in the early part of the Spanish regime with Lorenzo Tremedal, a bonafide resident of Surigao, as the Kapitan del Pueblo.

During the Spanish–American War, the town was almost reduced to ashes hence, it was reverted into a barrio until the earlier part of 1957. Through the undying efforts of Martillano Diaz, father of Ex-Board Member Macario M. Diaz, Anao-aon was emancipated and regained its status as a municipality by virtue of Executive Order No. 249 on May 24, 1957, during the time of President Carlos P. Garcia. Macario M, Diaz was given the title of Father of the Municipality of Anao-aon. On August 15, 1957, the municipality was inaugurated.

During the time of Mayor Francisco Delani, through House Bill No. 1768, approved May 20, 1971 by the House of the Senate, its unique and indigenous name Anao-aon was changed into San Francisco in honor of the Patron Saint, Saint Francis Xavier only to find out that it was creating confusion because there are many municipalities in the Philippines already named after San Francisco, but then it's too late for its politician authors and supporters to make the move to revert into its original name of Anao-aon.

== Geography ==
=== Barangays ===
San Francisco is politically subdivided into 11 barangays. Each barangay consists of puroks while some have sitios.

- Amontay
- Balite
- Banbanon
- Diaz
- Honrado
- Jubgan
- Linongganan
- Macopa
- Magtangale
- Oslao
- Poblacion

=== Climate ===
Climate data for San Francisco, Surigao del Norte
Month	Jan	Feb	Mar	Apr	May	Jun	Jul	Aug	Sep	Oct	Nov	Dec	Year
Mean daily maximum °C (°F)	27 (81)	27 (81)	28 (82)	29 (84)	29 (84)	29 (84)	29 (84)	30 (86)	30 (86)	29 (84)	28 (82)	28 (82)	29 (83)
Mean daily minimum °C (°F)	22 (72)	22 (72)	22 (72)	23 (73)	23 (73)	23 (73)	23 (73)	23 (73)	23 (73)	23 (73)	23 (73)	23 (73)	23 (73)
Average precipitation mm (inches)	152 (6.0)	116 (4.6)	90 (3.5)	68 (2.7)	88 (3.5)	96 (3.8)	78 (3.1)	73 (2.9)	70 (2.8)	96 (3.8)	125 (4.9)	132 (5.2)	1,184 (46.8)
Average rainy days	20.8	17.7	18.5	17.2	20.8	22.5	22.5	22.7	22.0	23.7	22.5	19.9	250.8
Source: Meteoblue

== Demographics ==
Population census of San Francisco
Year	Pop.	±% p.a.
1903	1,481	—
1960	6,272	+2.56%
1970	6,486	+0.34%
1975	7,572	+3.15%
1980	8,674	+2.75%
1990	9,445	+0.86%
1995	10,005	+1.09%
2000	11,521	+3.07%
2007	12,449	+1.07%
2010	13,335	+2.53%
2015	14,552	+1.68%
2020	15,347	+1.13%
2024	16,004	+1.01%
Source: Philippine Statistics Authority

== Economy ==
Poverty incidence of San Francisco (%)

Source: Philippine Statistics Authority
