= Joseph Welland (missionary) =

Joseph Welland (1834-1879) was a missionary from Dublin, Ireland, and founder of the Welland Gouldsmith School, who dedicated his life to Christian ministry in Calcutta, North India. As a member of the Church Missionary Society, Welland served the Cathedral Mission College and Christ Church in Calcutta. He held the role of Secretary of the Calcutta Corresponding Committee until 1876. As an editor and author, his works include, God in History, Heavenly Training, and Daily Bread, and Other Sermons. Welland built the Cathedral Mission College in Kolkota in 1865 and then founded the Welland School in 1876 in Kolkata, now the Welland Gouldsmith School.

== Early life and education ==
Joseph Welland was born in Dublin, Ireland, in 1834. He was the son of Joseph Welland, an architect from Midleton, Country Cork and Sophia Margaret Mills. Joseph had three brothers including Thomas Welland, bishop of Down, Connor.

On October 16, 1877, Welland married Emily A. R. Torpy.

Welland received his Bachelor of Arts degree from Trinity College of Dublin.

== Career ==
Welland was ordained a deacon in 1858 by the Bishop of Ossory and Ferns, and a year later, on October 15, 1859, he was ordained a priest by the Bishop on Manchester. He began his ministry as a curate of Killeban in Queen's County, Ireland, and later served at Trinity Church, Blackburn. Early on he served as the Domestic Chaplain to the Viceroys Lords Lawrence and Northbrook.

In December 1860, Welland embarked on his first mission to Calcutta, North India. Over the following years he worked in various roles, including serving the Kidderpore community in 1861.

In 1865, he supported the founding of the Cathedral Mission College of Calcutta and was part of the initial faculty. This was followed by his ministry at the Christ Church of Calcutta in 1867. He went back to England on November 9, 1869, but he returned to India on October 14, 1871. He then assumed the role of Secretary of Calcutta Corresponding Committee, a position he held until 1876. Illness required he return to England on April 10, 1876, amidst his time as secretary. He returned to Calcutta to resume his secretaryship on November 16, 1878, with the help of Reverend H.P. Parker.

=== Death and legacy ===
Welland died on December 17, 1879, in Calcutta.

Welland's writings included God in History (1865), a series of lectures created for his students and the Cathedral Mission College of Calcutta and Heavenly Training (1874), a collection of sermons delivered as Chaplain to the Calcutta Volunteers. After his death, his widow published a final volume of Welland's sermons, titled Daily Bread and Other Sermons in 1882.

The Welland School, founded by Welland in 1876, continues to bear his name as the Welland Gouldsmith School. The Welland Memorial School merged with the Gouldsmith Free School in 1936. It operates two campuses in Kolkota.
