= Acari (disambiguation) =

Acari is a group of arachnids containing ticks and mites.

Acari may also refer to:

- Acarí District, a district in Peru
- Acarí, the capital of Acarí District
- Professor Acari, a fictional character in the animated series Kim Possible
- Acari, Rio Grande do Norte, a municipality in Rio Grande do Norte, Brazil
- Acari River (Rio de Janeiro), a river in the city of Rio de Janeiro, Brazil
