= Caravelí province =

Coordinates: 15.772764°S 73.365775°W

Caravelí
- Province
- Location of Caravelí in the Arequipa Region
- Country: Peru
- Region: Arequipa
- Capital: Caravelí

Government
  - Mayor: Diego Arturo Montesinos Neyra (2019-2022)

Area
  - Total: 13,139.86 km^{2} (5,073.33 sq mi)

Population
  - Total: 41,346
  - Density: 3.1466/km^{2} (8.1497/sq mi)
- UBIGEO: 0403
- Website: www.municaraveli.gob.pe

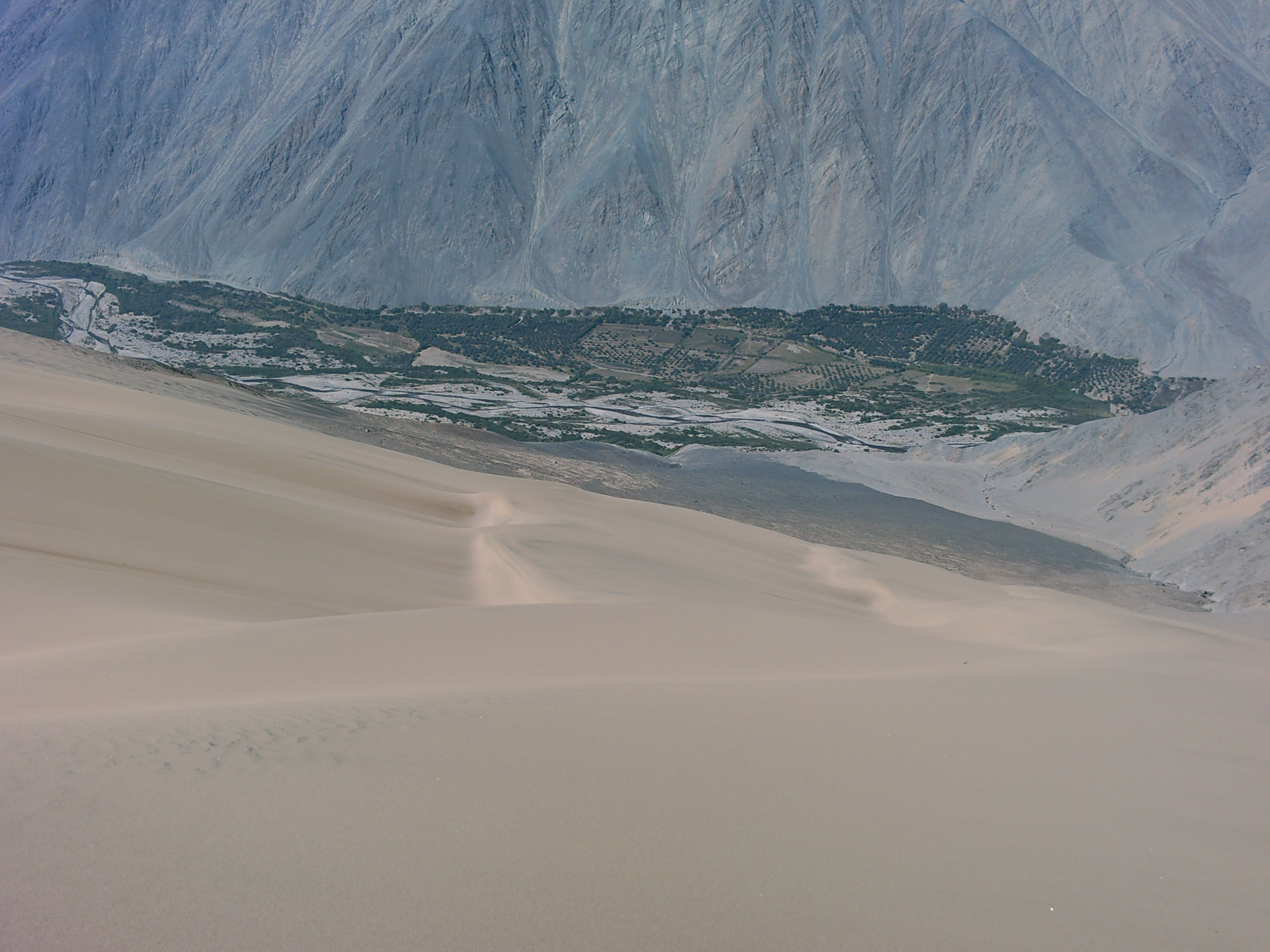
Aerial view of the province of Caravelí

Caravelí is one of eight provinces in the Arequipa Region of Peru, with its capital in the city of Caravelí. It borders the department of Ayacucho to the north; the provinces of La Unión, Condesuyos, and Camaná to the east; the Pacific Ocean to the south; and the department of Ica to the west.

Hierarchically within the Catholic Church, it belongs to the Prelature of Caravelí.

== History ==
This province was created by Law No. 8004 on February 22, 1935, which divided the province of Camaná during the government of President Óscar R. Benavides. The law does not specify the geographical reasons for its creation.

The capital of the province is the city of Caravelí, which was elevated to town status by law on November 9, 1839, and later to city status by law on September 2, 1870.

Maps from between 1500 and 1600 can be seen in the New York Public Library, where Caravelí is noted as an important settlement in the region.

Many of its districts do not have a creation law; they have existed since independence, while others, like the district of Lomas, were formerly hamlets of the district of Acarí until October 1935, when council members were appointed for the Lomas District Council.

== Political divisions ==
The province is divided into thirteen districts which are:

- Acarí (Acarí)
- Atico (Atico)
- Atiquipa (Atiquipa)
- Bella Unión (Bella Unión)
- Cahuacho (Cahuacho)
- Caravelí (Caravelí)
- Chala (Chala)
- Chaparra (Achanizo)
- Huanuhuanu (Tocota)
- Jaqui (Jaqui)
- Lomas (Lomas)
- Quicacha (Quicacha)
- Yauca (Yauca)

== Demographics ==
- Estimated population (2022): 40,316 inhabitants.
- Area: 13,139.41 km²
- Population density: 2.3 inhabitants/km²
- Capital: Caravelí (1779 meters above sea level)
- Number of districts: 13
- Distance from the departmental capital: 179 km

=== Historical Population Data ===
- 1961: 20,235
- 1972: 23,647
- 1981: 24,703
- 1993: 27,484

Population census 1993: 27,484

- Urban: 16,568
- Rural: 10,916
- Men: 15,363
- Women: 12,121

=== Ethnic groups ===
The province is inhabited by indigenous citizens of Aymara and Quechua descent. Spanish, however, is the language which the majority of the population (84.24%) learnt to speak in childhood, 14.49% of the residents started speaking using the Quechua language and 1.07% using Aymara (2007 Peru Census).

== Geology ==
This province is characterized by the Tertiary Intrusive-Cretaceous formation. Its capital, the city of Caravelí, is situated on this group of igneous rocks. The province has the longest coastline in the Arequipa department, roughly 200 km. The Coastal Range in this province varies in width between 20 and 30 km, reaching a height of up to 1500 meters above sea level.

At 1000 meters above sea level, in the coastal plain, there are pampas, hills, dry ravines, narrow valleys, dunes, and the hills of Atiquipa, Lomas, Atico, and Pescadores. It is the second-largest province by area in the department.

== Climate ==
The climate is arid and semi-warm in the coastal zone. In the highlands bordering the department of Ayacucho, the climate is temperate with light summer rains. The average annual temperature on the coast is between 17°C and 19°C, and in the highlands, it ranges between 12°C and 15°C.

Half of the province has a desert climate according to the Köppen classification. The areas near the coast have a steppe climate with winter rains. Zones located between 1500 and 2500 meters above sea level, like the provincial capital, have a steppe climate but with summer rains. Above 2500 meters, the climate is cold (boreal).

== Topography ==
The location of the province between the Pacific Ocean and the Andean foothills results in very rugged terrain. It features four geomorphological units: Coastal Belt, Coastal Strip, Coastal Plain, and Andean Front, and Transversal Valleys.

== Natural resources ==
The province has four types of land:

- Suitable for clean cultivation (14,380 ha)
- Suitable for permanent crops (26,990 ha)
- Suitable for pastures (27,240 ha)
- Protected lands (1,253,923 ha)

== Landmarks ==
=== Yanyarina ===
This is the northernmost beach, continuing from the one starting in Ica. It is a bird-filled beach separated from the La Libertad resort by a hill that extends into the sea and connects with a protruding islet separated by a water channel. On the islet, there is a rock known as Buddha among local fishermen.

=== La Libertad ===
Formed by a curved sandy cove where the sea is usually calm. It is sheltered by Punta Sombrerillo. A small beach, El Buda, marks the beginning of the resort, which continues with Lomo de Corvina and then, after a headland with a cross, the resort proper, with a few houses.

The coastline to the south features cliffs and inaccessible spots before reaching Cirilo beach, which is flanked by ravines and alleys. In this area is the islet known as El Submarino or El Barco de los Pajaritos due to the presence of guano birds. Further south are cliffs and a promontory known as Las Tres Cuevas and Punta Pirata before reaching Los Erizos beach, a sandy curve enclosed by cliffs.

=== El Cahuacho or Playa Grande ===
Located further south, it is wide, extensive, and inhabited by birds. Another hill marks the end of this beach. From there, the La Península islands can be seen. This area is also known as Los Arcos, consisting of three large guano islands forming channels and whimsical shapes. Their presence marks the beginning of Sombrerillo beach. A steep promontory ending in the Hércules island divides the beach into two parts.

=== Isla Hércules ===
At the end of a steep promontory. Flat, high, and large, it is connected to the shore by a sand neck forming two beaches.

At the end of these, an inaccessible islet inhabited by birds marks the beginning of Mansa de Lomas beach. This is long, with a sloping shore and fine sand from which machas (a type of shellfish) are harvested.

After a curve is Punta Lomas beach, where bathers have ramadas (shaded structures) and two hotels. This beach also features the old fishing port of Lomas. In front of this port, the steamship Pachitea sank in 1915.

At km 528 of the Panamericana Sur highway, an asphalt road leads to the port, which has houses built at the beginning of the 20th century, restaurants, and a hotel. Factories producing canned goods and fishmeal are located to the south.

=== Punta Lomas ===
A steep, high guano zone, opposite which is the Lobería islet, with a lighthouse and therefore restricted access.

Continuing south is Playa Brava de Lomas, large, with fine sand and extensive banks of machas. From there, the dunes extend inland, driven by strong sea winds. The beach ends at Punta Peñuetas. In the past, the area was known, especially by English cartographers, as Punta Paquija or Chaviña.

=== Playa Peñuelas ===
A small beach bordered by islets populated by sea lions, followed by several small beaches of sand and rocks.

=== Morro Chala ===
This hill marks the boundary of the Tanaca resort, famous for its pools among the cliffs. The hill, described in 17th-century chronicles, is formed by the peaks Cusihuamán and Cahuamarca (1297 meters above sea level) and a dune sand hill (1148 meters above sea level).

With black and reddish colors, Morro Chala forms a 25 km curve between Tanaca and Chala beach. This hill, crossed by freshwater that allows the growth of casuarinas and fig trees, houses pre-Columbian ruins and terraces, the only ones in Peru located on the beach.

=== Tanaca ===
To the south are the Tanaca pools. The cliffs begin with the Maucayata cove, with calm pools and guano islets. In this area, there are pre-Columbian ruins that may have been used as granaries.

=== Silaca ===
Continuing south, at km 596.5, after passing large grass areas and islets with sea lions and guano birds, is the Silaca resort. It is only populated in summer by families from the Jaqui district.

The Silaca resort resembles an Inca village amid ruins and terraces, with houses made of stone and cone-shaped totora roofs.

The pools here have names such as Los Hombres, Las Sirenas, Las Viejas, el desembarcadero, de Piero, Los Curcos o Jorobados, de La Cruz, Los Compadres, Brujillos, Vladimir, and Los Pajaritos. Between Los Compadres and Brujillos is the guano promontory of Puerto Viejo, the Lobería islet, the Santa Rosa ravine and islet, and the Ocopa cove.

This resort offers a significant variety of seafood (lapas, barquillos, choros) and fish.

=== Jihuay ===
South of the Los Pajaritos pool and the ravine where the Atiquipa river flows, is Jihuay beach. On the same route is the former Moca resort, full of ruins and terraces, abandoned and a twin to Silaca.

=== Puerto Inca ===
The last beach of Morro Chala is Puerto Inca, which until the early 20th century was known as Llacpatera. Here are Inca ruins and an Inca trail leading to the historical Incan capital Cusco (Qosqo = 'navel of the world').

Puerto Inca is located at km 603 of the Panamericana Sur highway, and it is said that the Inca used to bathe there.

=== Chala ===
Chala Bay is a large sandy beach located south of Puerto Inca. It has three sectors known as Aguadita, La Calera, and Playa Grande or Playa Hermosa.

From here, it is said that the chasquis (messengers who ran long distances in short times) used to carry fresh fish to Cusco.

=== Playa Chica ===
Continuing south is Playa Chica, with a flat shore and calm sea. It has an artisanal pier with nearby islets serving as a natural breakwater. These islets connect to the Centinela hill, where a lighthouse is located on its summit.

== Authorities ==
=== Regional ===
- Regional Counselor (2019-2022): Santiago Neyra Almenara (Alliance for Progress)

=== Municipal ===
- Mayor (2019-2022): Diego Arturo Montesinos Neyra, of Arequipa Renace.
- Councilors:
  - Ángel Aníbal Montoya Negrillo (Arequipa Renace)
  - Humberto Zacarías Quispe Huamaní (Arequipa Renace)
  - Teresa Marilú Jayo Morón (Arequipa Renace)
  - Ricardo Rómulo Dueñas Benites (Arequipa Renace)
  - Karla Gutiérrez Arapa (Arequipa Renace)
  - Leogardis Diosely Domínguez Martínez (Alliance for Progress)
  - Luis Moisés Rosas Chuquitaype (Popular Action)

== Festivities ==
Caravelí Province celebrates various festivals, including:

- Saint Peter
- Our Lady of Buen Paso
- Saint Andre

== See also ==
- Department of Arequipa
- Administrative divisions of Peru
- Prelature of Caravelí
- Kukuli
- Tambo Viejo
