= Melgar es Arequipa, Campeones del 81 =

- Theatrical release poster
- Directed by: Wildo Ontiveros Aparicio
- Written by: Wildo Ontiveros Aparicio
- Produced by: Pilar Rivera
- Release date: March 23, 2023 (Arequipa)
- Running time: 80 minutes
- Country: Peru
- Language: Spanish

Melgar es Arequipa, Campeones del 81 (lit. 'Melgar is Arequipa, Champions of '81') is a 2023 Peruvian documentary film written and directed by Wildo Ontiveros Aparicio in his directorial debut. It follows the story behind the 1981 feat, collecting testimonies from the protagonists who achieved the first national title of the FBC Melgar.

== Synopsis ==
Documentary that tells the successful campaign that the Melgar Club carried out in the national championship of the season from 1980 to 1981. It has interviews, testimonies, archive videos and graphic material of the players.

== Production ==
Principal photography began in 2019. However, filming was completed in the last months of 2020 due to the COVID-19 pandemic, in Mollendo, Camaná and Caravelí.

== Release ==
Melgar es Arequipa, Campeones del 81 premiered on March 23, 2023, exclusively at the Cinemark Parque Lambrani, Arequipa.

== Box office ==
The film lasted 1 week in billboard, attracting 221 viewers, becoming the lowest-grossing Peruvian film of 2023.
