= Atico District =

Coordinates: 16.2253°S 73.6199°W

Atico Atiku
- District
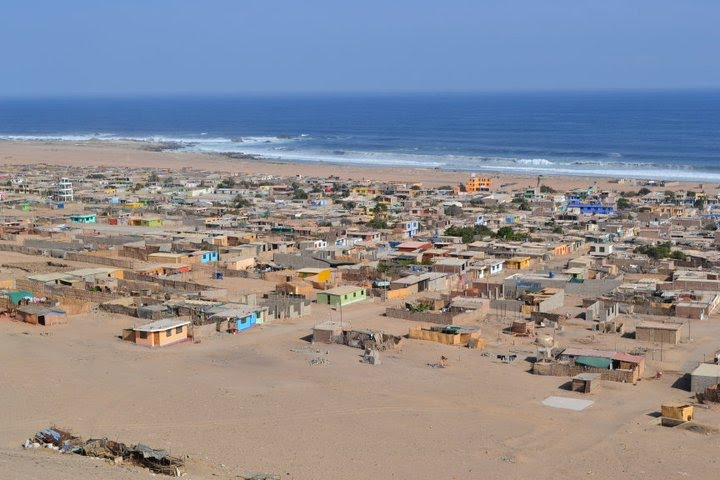
- Atico
- Interactive map of Atico
- Country: Peru
- Region: Arequipa
- Province: Caravelí
- Founded: December 9, 1897
- Capital: Atico

Government
  - Mayor: Mauro Milton Medina Urday

Area
  - Total: 3,146.65 km^{2} (1,214.93 sq mi)
- Elevation: 75 m (246 ft)

Population (2017 census)
  - Total: 5,215
  - Density: 1.657/km^{2} (4.292/sq mi)
- Time zone: UTC-5 (PET)
- UBIGEO: 040303

The district of Atico is one of the 13 that make up the province of Caravelí, located in the department of Arequipa, in southern Peru.

From the hierarchical point of view of the Catholic Church, it is part of the Prelature of Caravelí in the Archdiocese of Arequipa.

== History ==
The district was created by Law of December 9, 1897, in the government of President Nicolás de Piérola Villena.

== Tourism ==
• Puyenca: This beach features swimming pools for adults and children including musical entertainment for the residents of Atico and its visitors.

• Poza Verde: In its beginnings it was a natural pool where mostly children came due to its low depth. Over the years, the district government decided to remodel the place by expanding the pool and the surrounding area. Now musical groups and orchestras usually appear in the summers.

• Los colorados: This is a vast beach known for its inhabitants, in it we can find a great variety of crabs, limpets, pancoras, mussels, among others. this beach is characterized by its low waves and the large area of sand that it has.

=== Communications and access roads ===
Penthouse is located at km 700 of the Panamericana Sur, 10 hours from Lima, 6 hours from Ica, 6 hours from Arequipa, 2 hours from Camaná.

== Sports ==
The District has as its main stage the "Municipal Stadium of Atico" which serves for the District Football League of Atico, in addition to having hosted the Departmental and Provincial Stage, being represented with great repercussion in the Peru Cup by the "Club Social Los Chinitos " in recent years.

Among the most popular clubs are, in addition to Chinitos, Jorge Chávez, El Porvenir, Unión Marítimo and Defensor San Pedro.

== Authorities ==
=== Municipal ===
• 2019 − 2022

• Mayor: Mauro Milton Medina Urday, de Fuerza Arequipeña.

• Governing

1. Briceida Katherine Sierra Sánchez (Fuerza Arequipeña)
2. Carmelo Hipólito Vega Fernández (Fuerza Arequipeña)
3. Yhelma Ochoa Flores (Fuerza Arequipeña)
4. Juan Paulino Huamán Aquino (Fuerza Arequipeña)
5. Andrés Tapia Vega (Arequipa - Unidos por el Gran Cambio)

=== Past mayors ===
• 2015-2018: José Pedro Gómez Aguayo Atico - Caraveli - Arequipa

=== Festivities ===
- Santísima Cruz.
- San Pedro
- Señor de los Milagros.
- San Martín de Porres.
- El aniversario de nuestro distrito Atico la Florida que es el 18 de octubre.

== See also ==
• Territorial organization of Peru
