= Quicacha District =

Coordinates: 15.6290°S 73.7969°W

Quicacha
- District
- Interactive map of Quicacha
- Country: Peru
- Region: Arequipa
- Province: Caravelí
- Capital: Quicacha

Government
  - Mayor: Isidoro Mario Sandoval Montoya

Area
  - Total: 1,048.42 km^{2} (404.80 sq mi)
- Elevation: 1,820 m (5,970 ft)

Population (2005 census)
  - Total: 1,980
  - Density: 1.89/km^{2} (4.89/sq mi)
- Time zone: UTC-5 (PET)
- UBIGEO: 040312

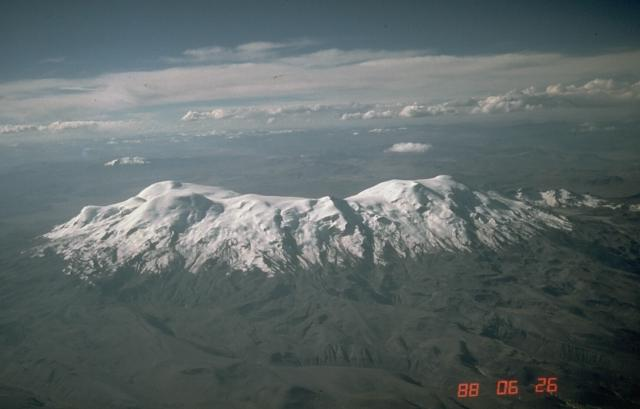
Nevado Coropuna dominates the surrounding landscape.

Quicacha District is one of thirteen districts of the province Caravelí in Peru.
