= Chala District =

Coordinates: 15.8477°S 74.2496°W

Chala
- District
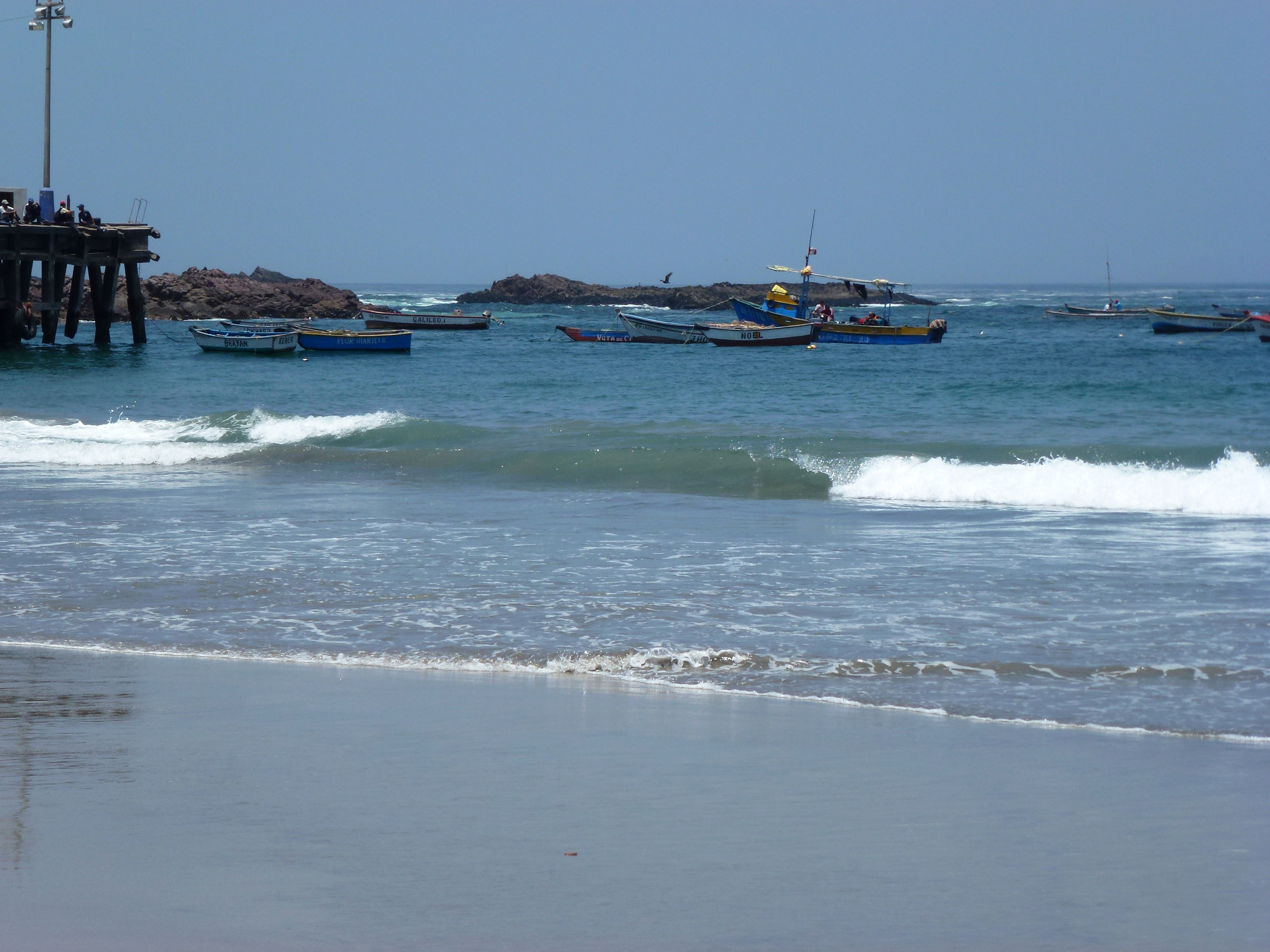
- A beach in the town of Chala
- Interactive map of Chala
- Country: Peru
- Region: Arequipa
- Province: Caravelí
- Founded: January 2, 1857
- Capital: Chala

Government
  - Mayor: Víctor Tomas Pacheco Puquio

Area
  - Total: 378.38 km^{2} (146.09 sq mi)
- Elevation: 12 m (39 ft)

Population (2017)
  - Total: 9,240
  - Density: 24.4/km^{2} (63.2/sq mi)
- Time zone: UTC-5 (PET)
- UBIGEO: 040307

Chala District is one of thirteen districts of the province Caravelí in Peru. The capital town of the district is the port of Chala.

== History ==
The district was established during the republic times on January 2, 1857 during the government of the President Ramon Castilla.

== Geography ==
Because of the Panamerican Highway, that runs through the district, its economy it is dynamic. The capital of the district, Chala has a small port for fishermen. The district has some mining establishments nearby specially gold and this is the reason of the presence of businesses that offer this metal.

== Authorities ==
The mayor in function now is Bruno Salinas Alvarez, who was elected for the period 2015 - 2018.

== Festivities ==
Some include:

- June 29; day of Saint Peter (Day of the fishermen).
- December 9; day of the Immaculate Concepcion of the virgin Saint Mary, Saint patron of the port of Chala.
- July 16; day of the fest of the Virgin of Chapi, formerly a patronal fest in the district.

== Tourism ==
During the summer, the district receives tourists from different parts of the country to enjoy its good beaches and its good seafood. Close to the capital city it is located Puerto Inca, that has the only ruins of the Inca times in the coast. It is said that the Inca enjoyed here the sun of the summer. Now, it is visited for many local and foreign tourists. The capital town of Chala has basic hotels, restaurants and bus station.

== Communications ==
The district is connected to the rest of the country for the Panamerican Highway. The highway is well signaled and it takes about 9 hours to arrive to the port of Chala from Arequipa the capital of the region.
