= Cahuacho District =

Coordinates: 15.5498°S 73.4081°W

Cahuacho Qawachu
- District
- Interactive map of Cahuacho
- Country: Peru
- Region: Arequipa
- Province: Caravelí
- Founded: February 22, 1935
- Capital: Cahuacho

Government
  - Mayor: Edgar Manuel Espinoza Aguayo

Area
  - Total: 1,412.1 km^{2} (545.2 sq mi)
- Elevation: 3,340 m (10,960 ft)

Population (2005 census)
  - Total: 952
  - Density: 0.674/km^{2} (1.75/sq mi)
- Time zone: UTC-5 (PET)
- UBIGEO: 040306

Cahuacho District is one of thirteen districts of the province Caravelí in Peru.
