= Bella Unión District =

Coordinates: 15.4502°S 74.6590°W

Bella Unión
- District
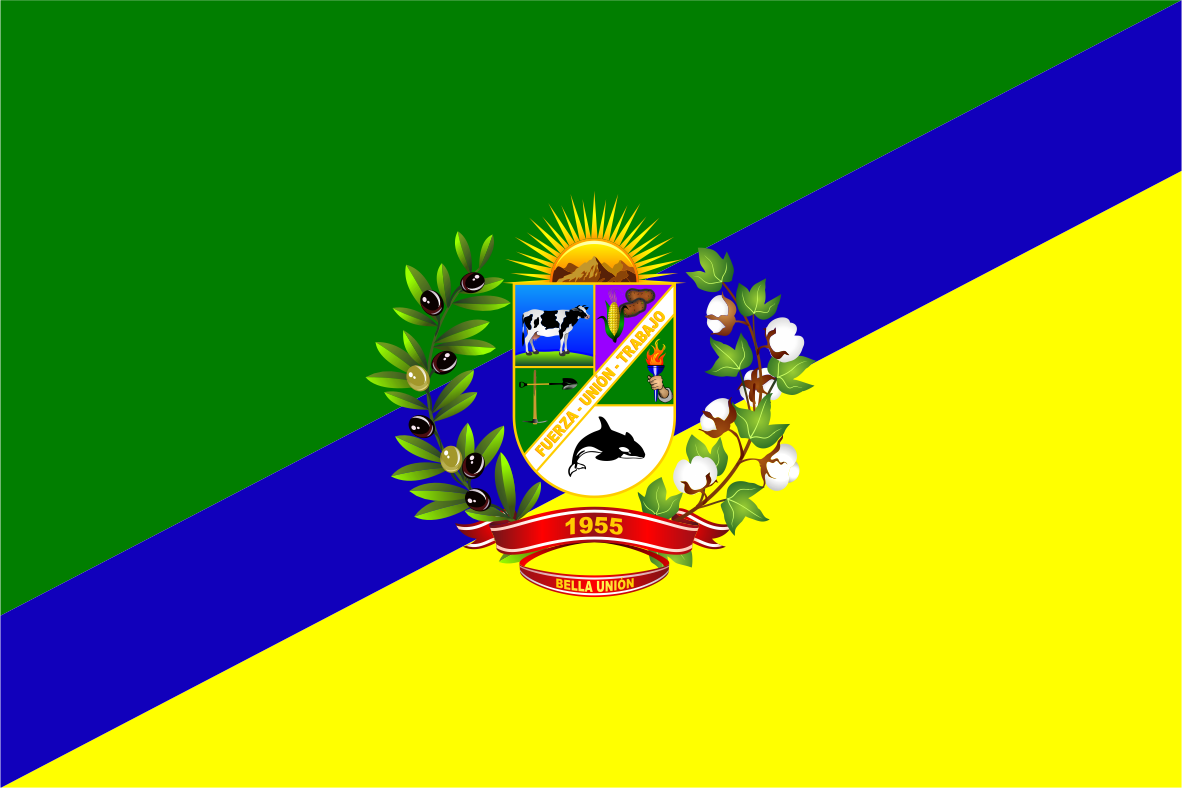
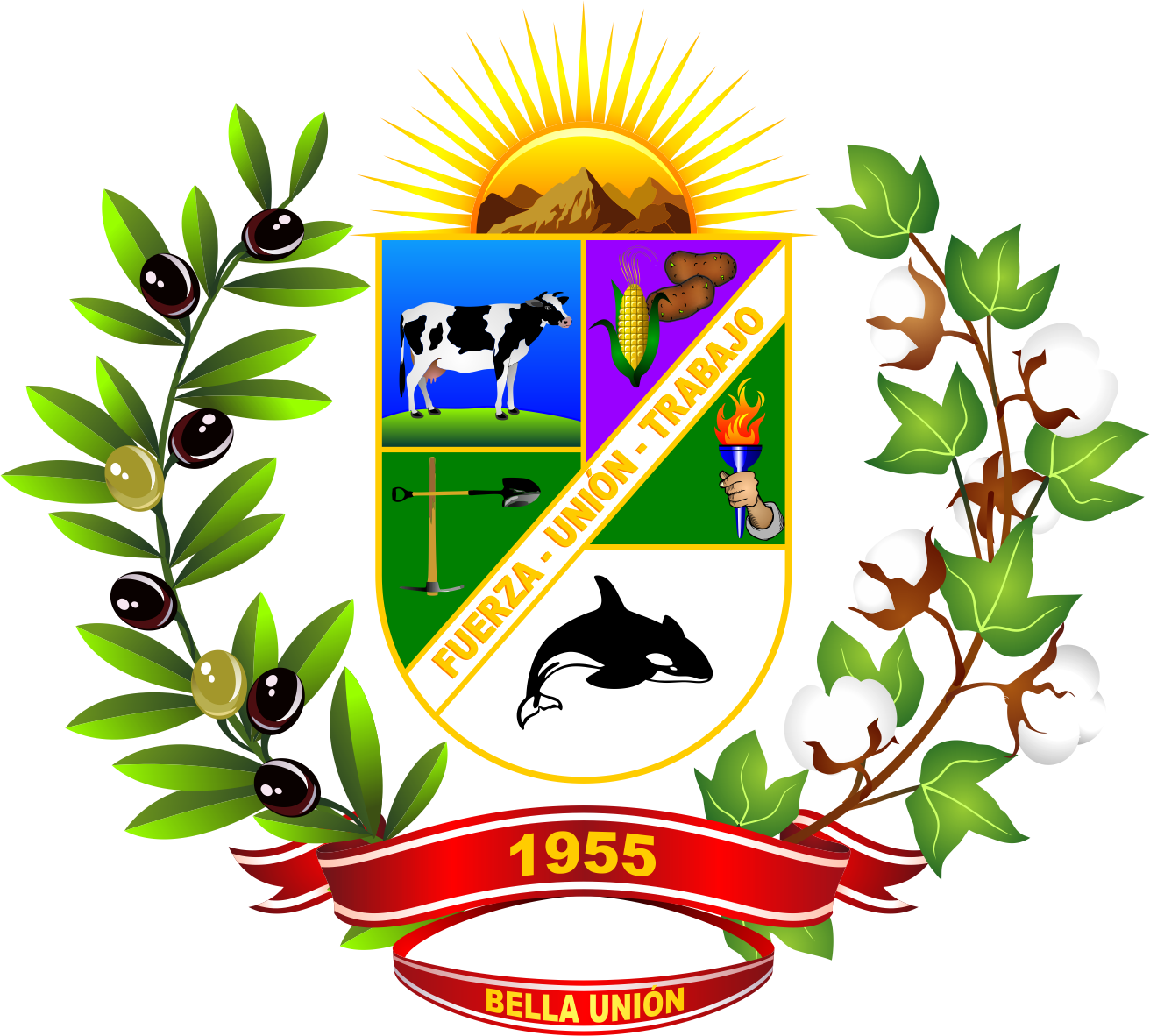
- Flag Coat of arms
- Interactive map of Bella Unión
- Country: Peru
- Region: Arequipa
- Province: Caravelí
- Founded: November 24, 1955
- Capital: Bella Unión

Government
  - Mayor: Daniel Aurelio Denegri Ayala

Area
  - Total: 1,588.41 km^{2} (613.29 sq mi)
- Elevation: 225 m (738 ft)

Population (2005 census)
  - Total: 2,717
  - Density: 1.711/km^{2} (4.430/sq mi)
- Time zone: UTC-5 (PET)
- UBIGEO: 040305

Bella Unión District is one of thirteen districts of the province Caravelí in Peru.
