= Our Lady of the Cloud =

Marian devotion of Ecuador and Peru

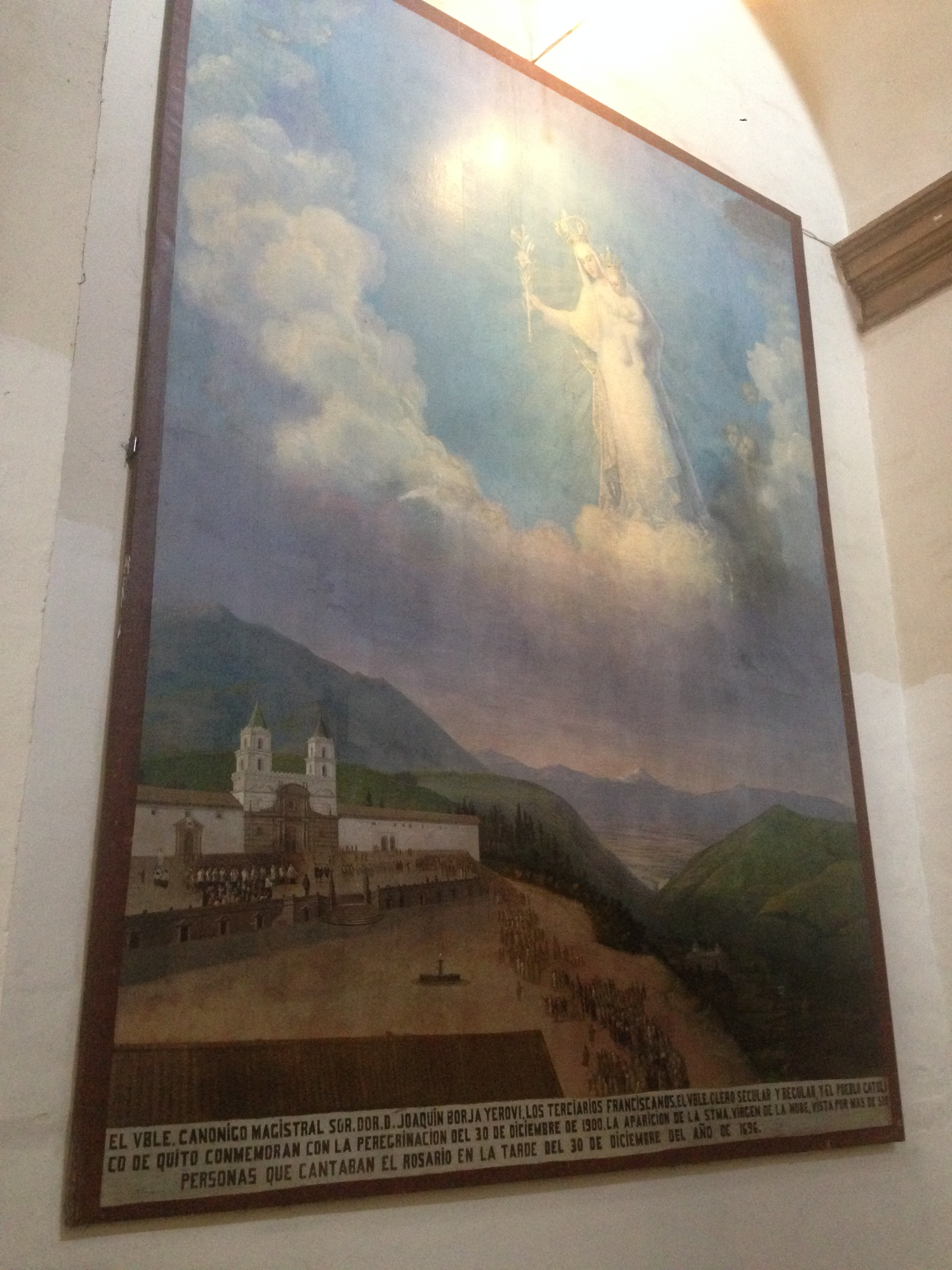
A crowd commemorates the miracle of Our Lady of the Cloud in front of the Church of St. Francis in Quito on December 30, 1900.

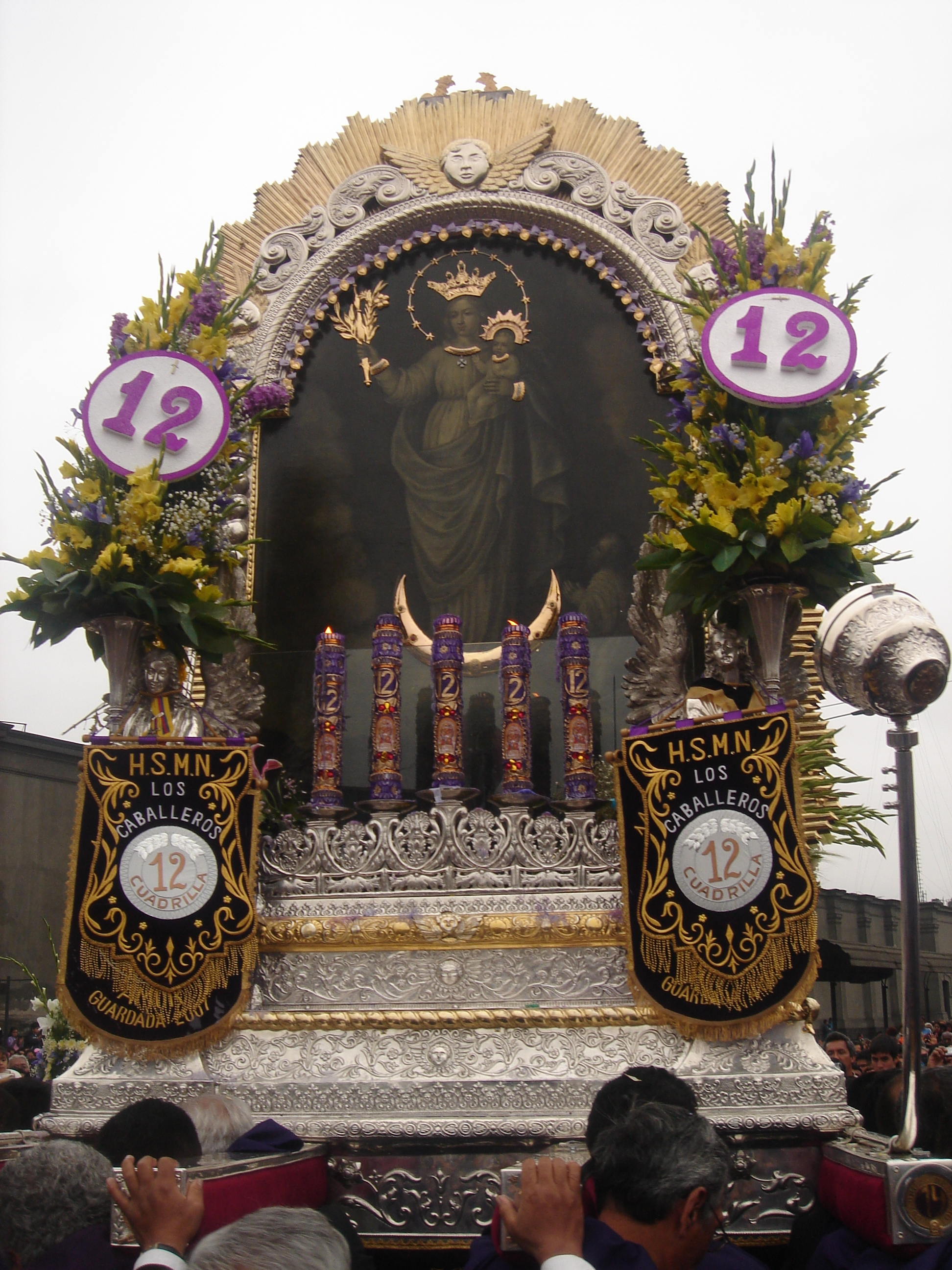
Our Lady of the Cloud image, Lord of Miracles procession in Lima, Peru.

Our Lady of the Cloud is a Marian devotion of Ecuador and Peru.

== History ==
The depiction of the Virgin Mary. When in 1696 the bishop of Quito Sancho de Andrade y Figueroa was ill on December 30 the people of Guápulo or Quito made a prayer procession to Quito with the image of Our Lady from the church of Guápulo. On their way the Blessed Mother appeared in the sky on a cloud seen by about 500 people. After the event Franciscan friars founded a sanctuary in Azogues, known as the Santuario de la Virgen de la Nube. Now the Fiesta de la Virgen de la Nube takes place annually in Azogues. The veneration was also adopted by nuns in Lima which started its spreading in Peru.

== Veneration ==
Our Lady of the Cloud is venerated in Ecuador, in Peru and by immigrants in the United States.

== See also ==
- Lord of Miracles
