= Huanuhuanu District =

Coordinates: 15.6442°S 74.0711°W

Huanuhuanu Wanu Wanu
- District
- Interactive map of Huanuhuanu
- Country: Peru
- Region: Arequipa
- Province: Caravelí
- Founded: January 2, 1857
- Capital: Tocota

Government
  - Mayor: Moises Santiago De La Cruz Rosalino

Area
  - Total: 708.52 km^{2} (273.56 sq mi)
- Elevation: 948 m (3,110 ft)

Population (2005 census)
  - Total: 1,726
  - Density: 2.436/km^{2} (6.309/sq mi)
- Time zone: UTC-5 (PET)
- UBIGEO: 040309

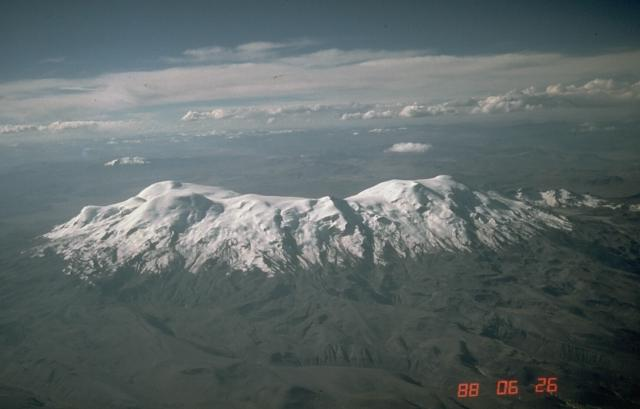
Nevado Coropuna; Peru’s largest and tallest volcano, viewed from the south. True summit on the left is located at the northwestern end of the vast summit plateau.

Huanuhuanu District is one of thirteen districts of the province Caravelí in Peru.
