= Chala, Peru =

Chala
- Town
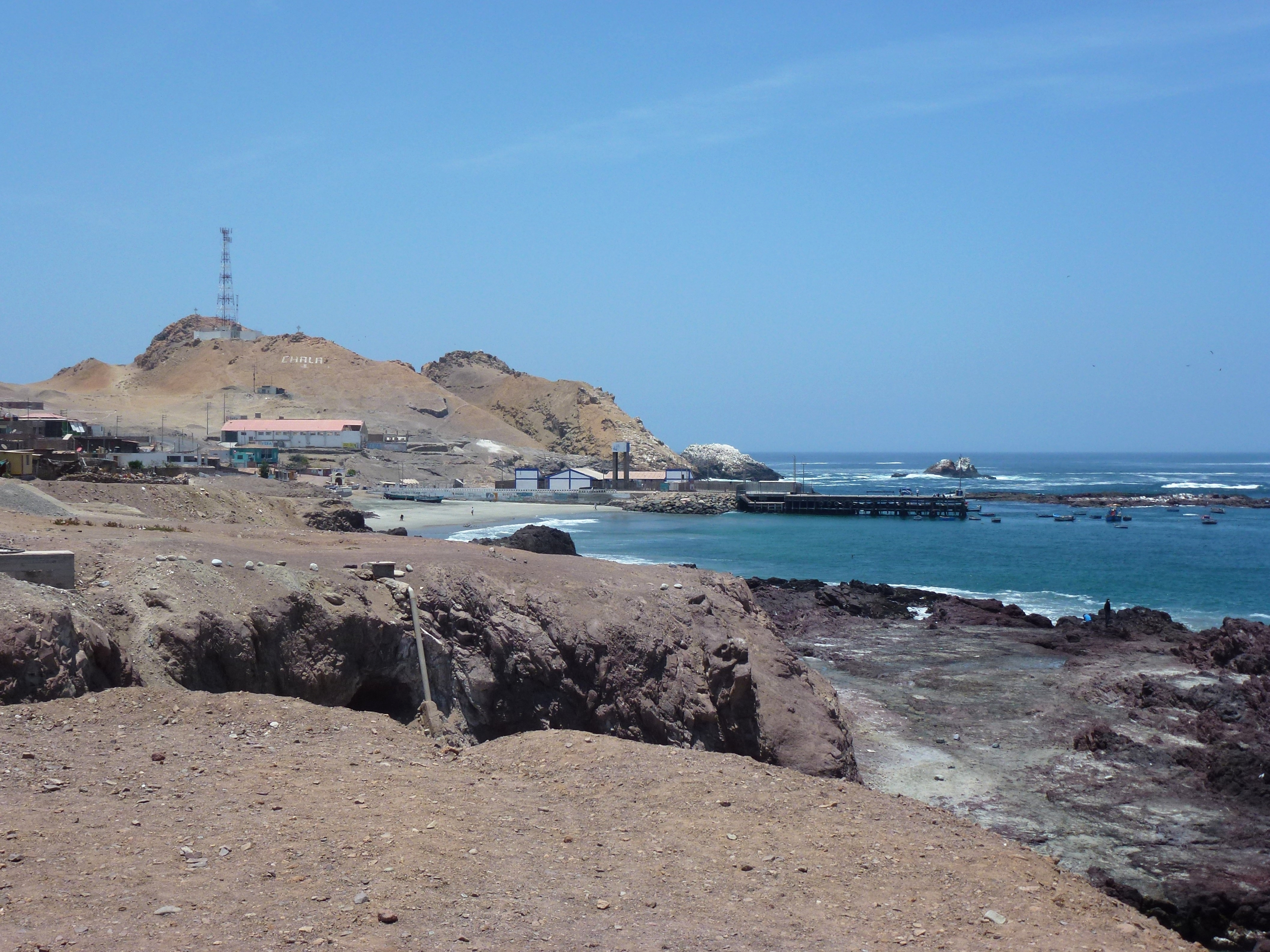
- A beach in Chala

- Location in Peru
- Coordinates: 15°51′07″S 74°15′00″W
- Country: Peru
- Region: Arequipa
- Province: Caravelí
- District: Chala
- Founded: January 2, 1857

Government
  - Mayor: Agustin Condori Motta
- Elevation: 12 m (39 ft)

Population (2017)
  - Total: 9,240
- Time zone: UTC-5 (PET)

Chala is a Peruvian town located in the Arequipa Region, Caraveli Province, and is the capital of district of Chala. It borders the Pacific Ocean. It lies approximately 170 km south of Nazca en route to the Panamerican Highway between Nazca and Camana. It is notable for the nearby Incan ruins of Puerto Inca. According to the 2017 census, it had a population of 9,240 inhabitants.
