= Caravelí District =

Coordinates: 15.7764°S 73.9338°W

Caravelí Qarawili
- District
- Interactive map of Caravelí
- Country: Peru
- Region: Arequipa
- Province: Caravelí
- Capital: Caravelí

Government
  - Mayor: Diego Arturo Montesinos Neyra (2019-2022)

Area
  - Total: 727.68 km^{2} (280.96 sq mi)
- Elevation: 1,779 m (5,837 ft)

Population (2017)
  - Total: 4,259
  - Density: 5.853/km^{2} (15.16/sq mi)
- Time zone: UTC-5 (PET)
- UBIGEO: 040301

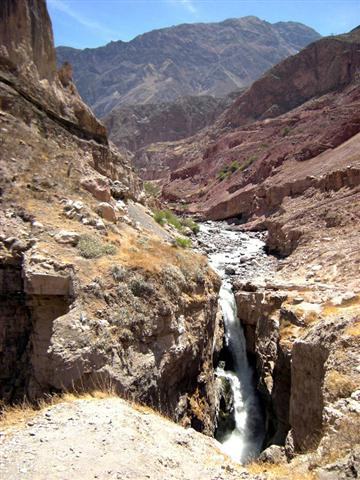
Cascade of Sipia, Cotahuasi

Caravelí District is one of thirteen districts of the province Caravelí in Peru.

== See also ==
- Kukuli
