= Jaqui District =

Coordinates: 15.4739°S 74.4381°W

Jaqui Haki
- District
- Interactive map of Jaqui
- Country: Peru
- Region: Arequipa
- Province: Caravelí
- Capital: Jaqui

Government
  - Mayor: Vicente Martin Cornejo Cruces

Area
  - Total: 424.73 km^{2} (163.99 sq mi)
- Elevation: 295 m (968 ft)

Population (2005 census)
  - Total: 1,636
  - Density: 3.852/km^{2} (9.976/sq mi)
- Time zone: UTC-5 (PET)
- UBIGEO: 040310

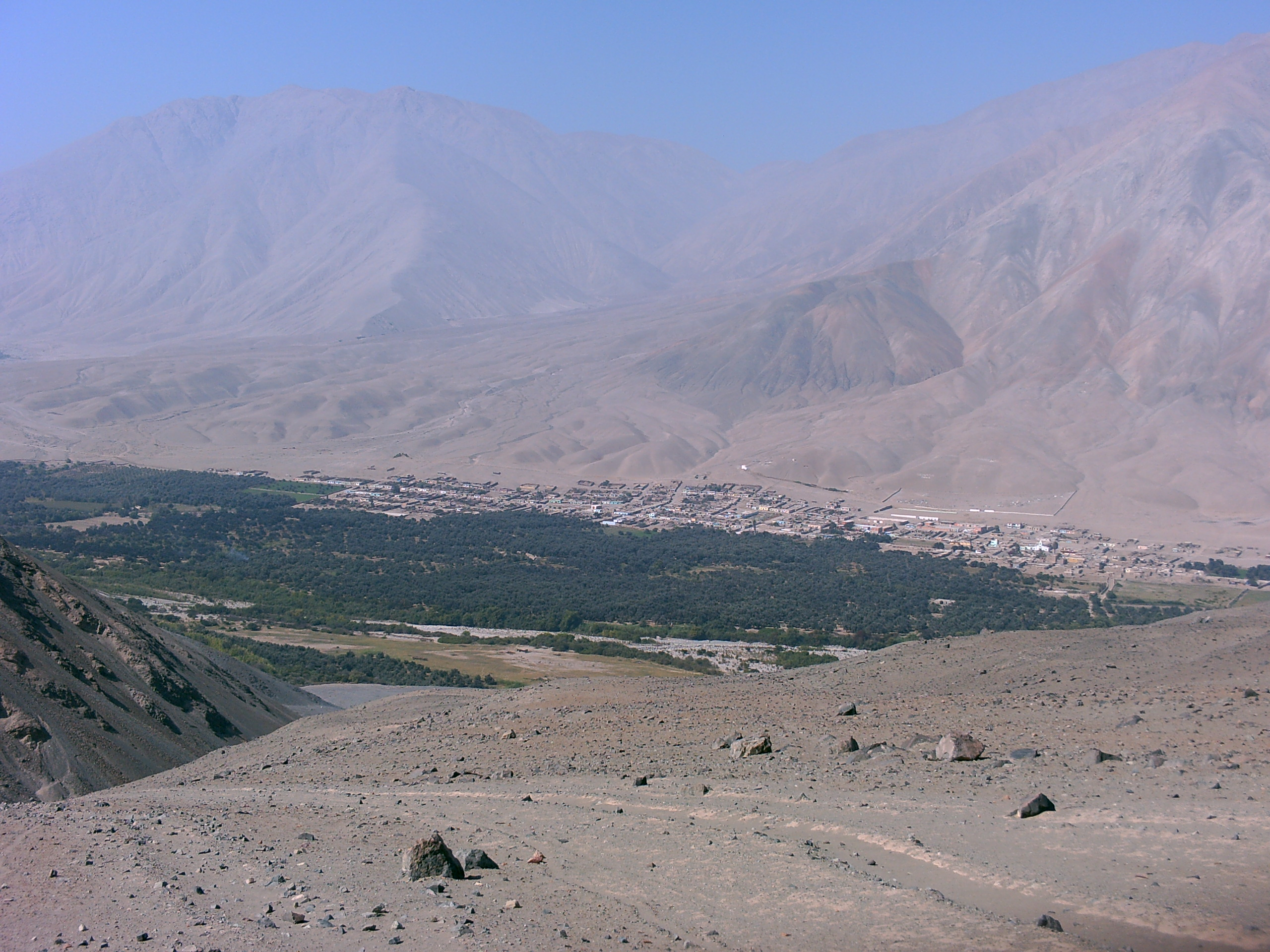
Jaqui City

Jaqui District is one of thirteen districts of the province Caravelí in Peru.
