= Lomas District =

Coordinates: 15.5661°S 74.8449°W

Lomas Lumas
- District
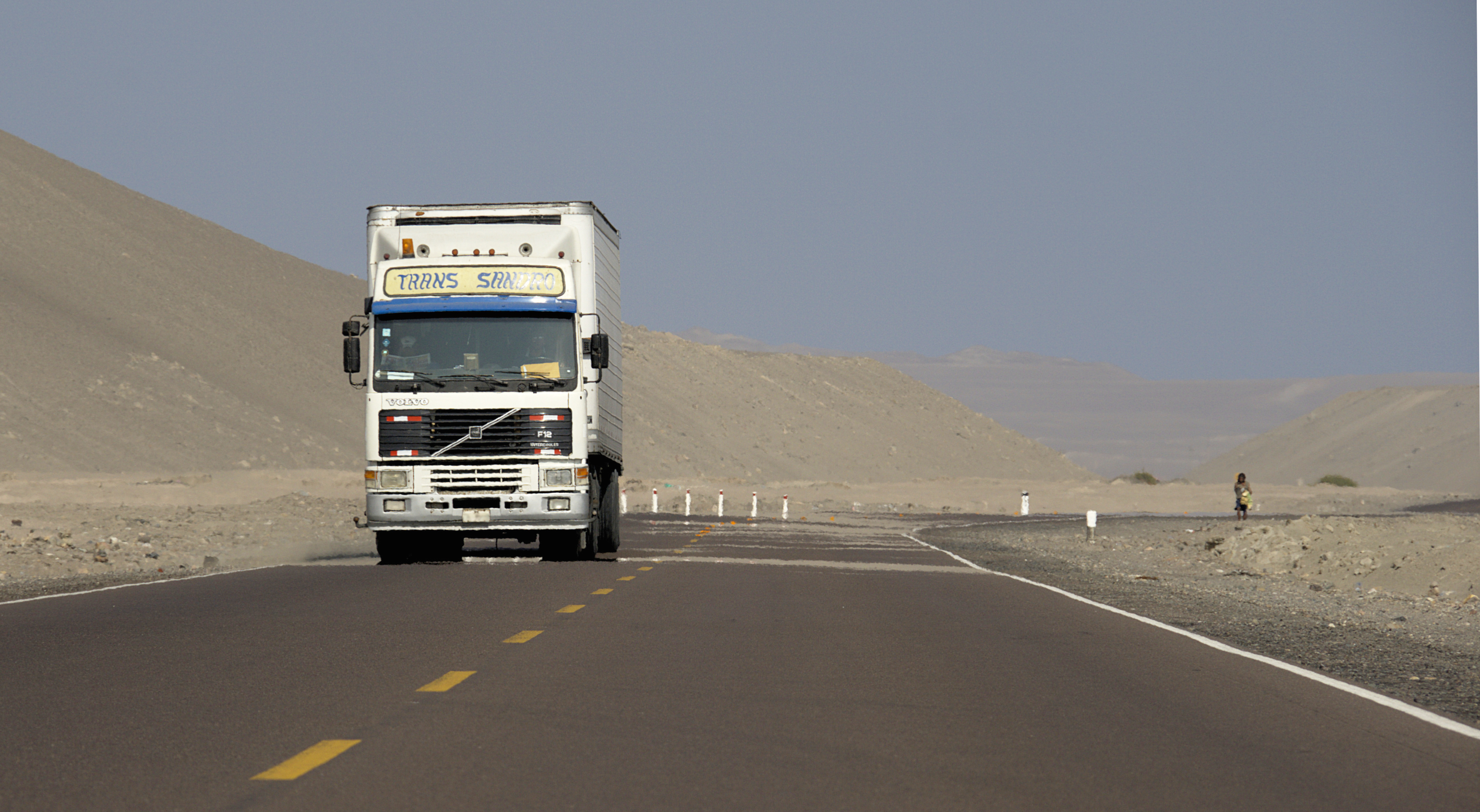
- Pan-American Highway near Puerto De Lomas, Lomas District
- Interactive map of Lomas
- Country: Peru
- Region: Arequipa
- Province: Caravelí
- Founded: October 22, 1935
- Capital: Lomas

Government
  - Mayor: Lia Josefina Bocanegra Mejia

Area
  - Total: 452.72 km^{2} (174.80 sq mi)
- Elevation: 18 m (59 ft)

Population (2005 census)
  - Total: 919
  - Density: 2.03/km^{2} (5.26/sq mi)
- Time zone: UTC-5 (PET)
- UBIGEO: 040311

Lomas District is one of thirteen districts of the province Caravelí in Peru.
