= Sanctuary and Monastery of Las Nazarenas =

Church in Lima, Peru

Sanctuary of Las Nazarenas
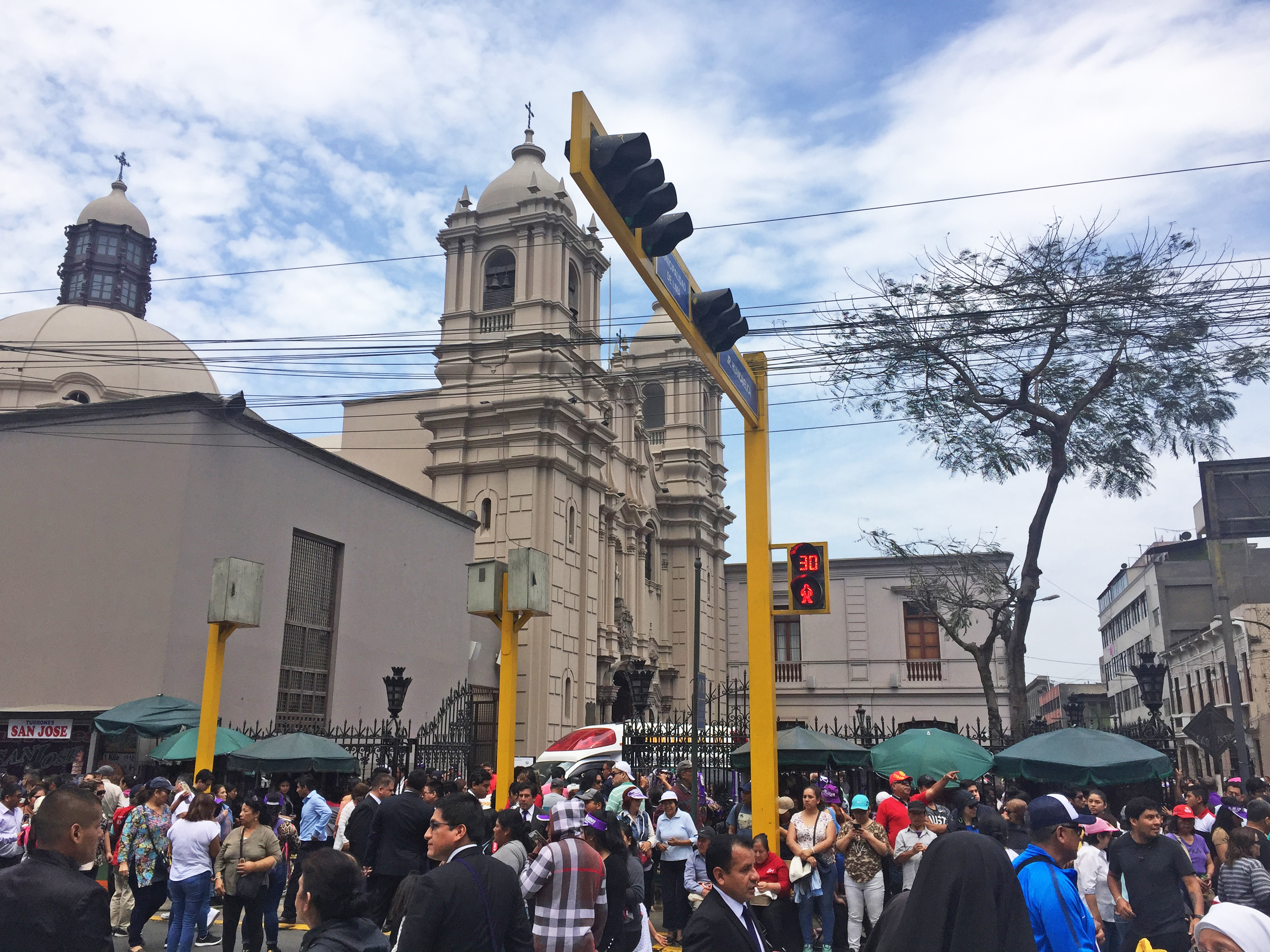
- Facade of the monastery

Religion
- Affiliation: Roman Catholic
- Diocese: Lima
- Province: Lima
- Ecclesiastical or organisational status: Sanctuary

Location
- Location: Lima District, Lima, Peru
- Interactive map of Sanctuary of Las Nazarenas
- Coordinates: 12°02′44.03″S 77°02′14.521″W

Architecture
- Completed: 1771

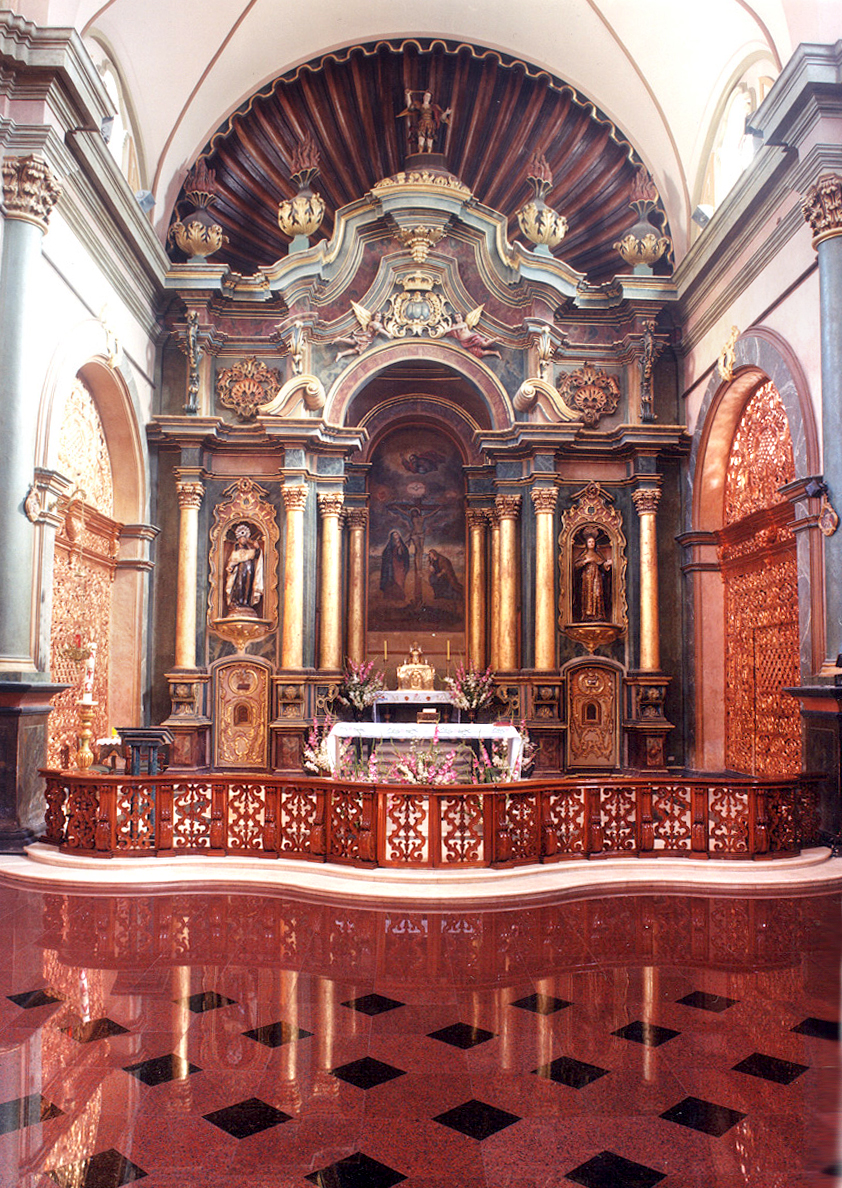
Altar Señor de los Milagros in Sanctuary of Las Nazarenas - Lima, Peru

The Sanctuary and Monastery of Las Nazarenas is a church in Lima and is the site of the Peruvian Catholic procession of the Lord of Miracles, Señor de los Milagros, who is also the patron of the city. It was constructed together with the Monastery of Nazarenas, after a major earthquake it was finally completed in 1771.

From this church begins America's most important religious procession on October 18, 19 and 28.

== See also ==
- Lord of Miracles
