= Guápulo =

District of Quito, Ecuador

Coordinates: 0.20272°S 78.47822°W

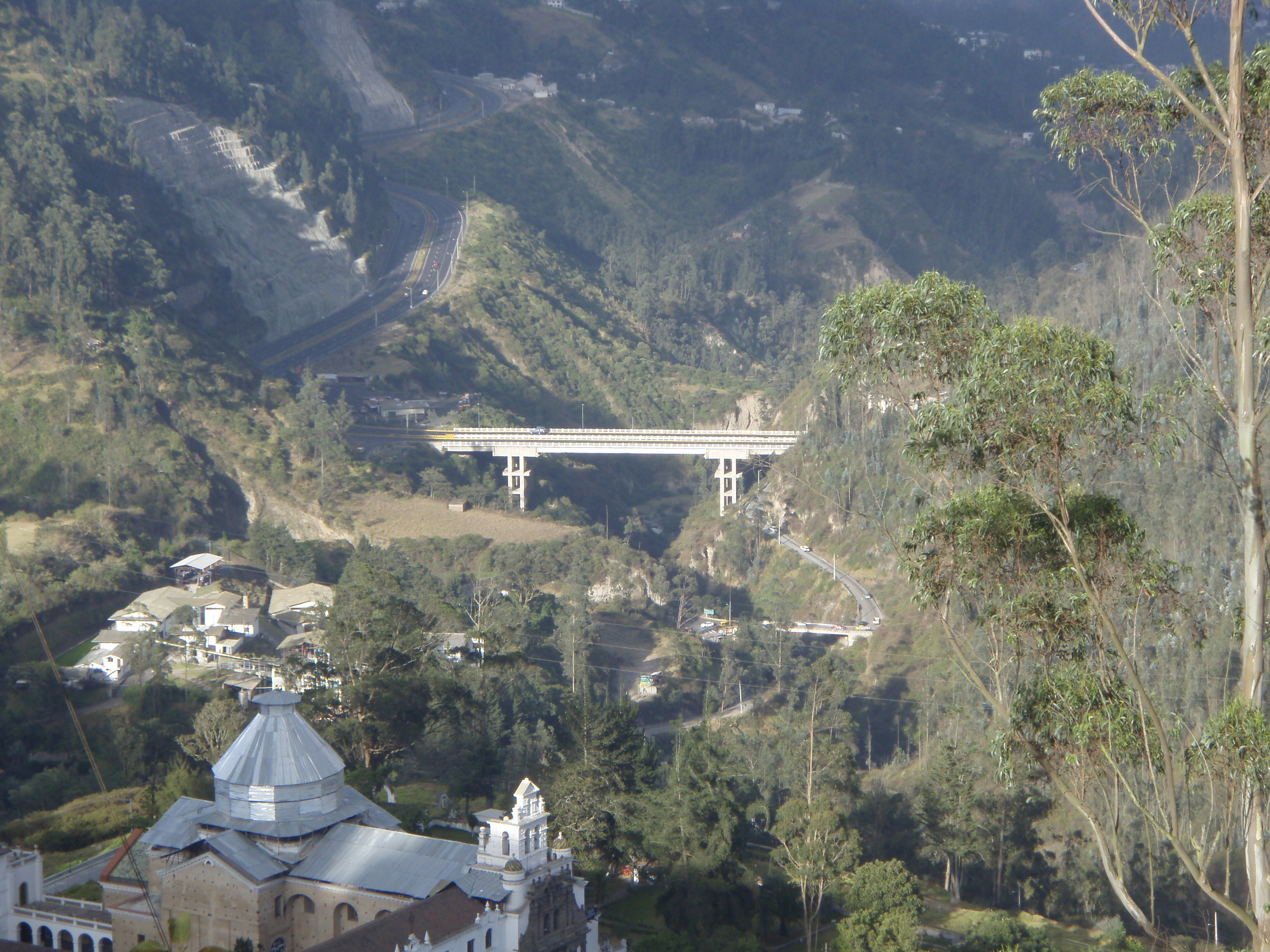

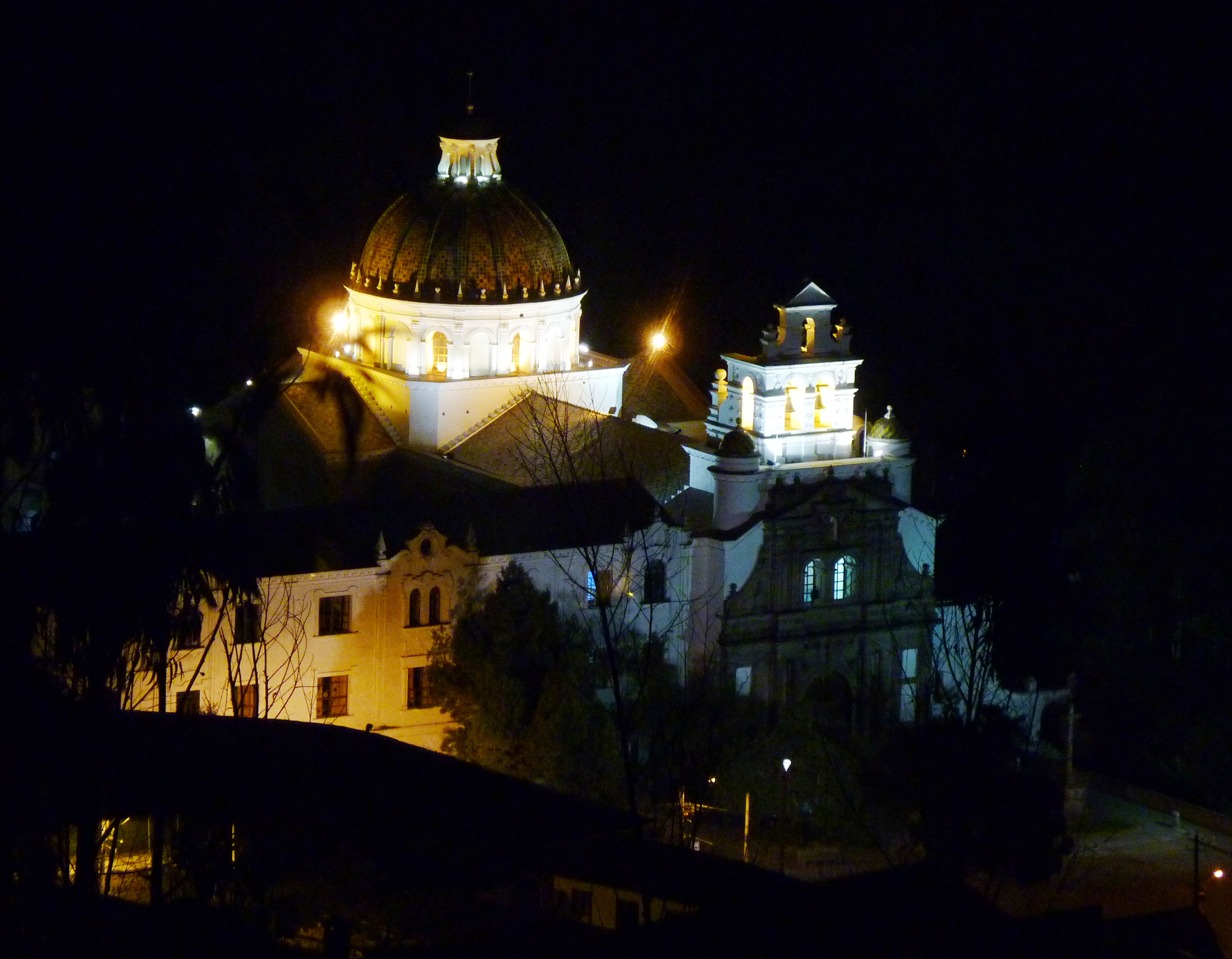

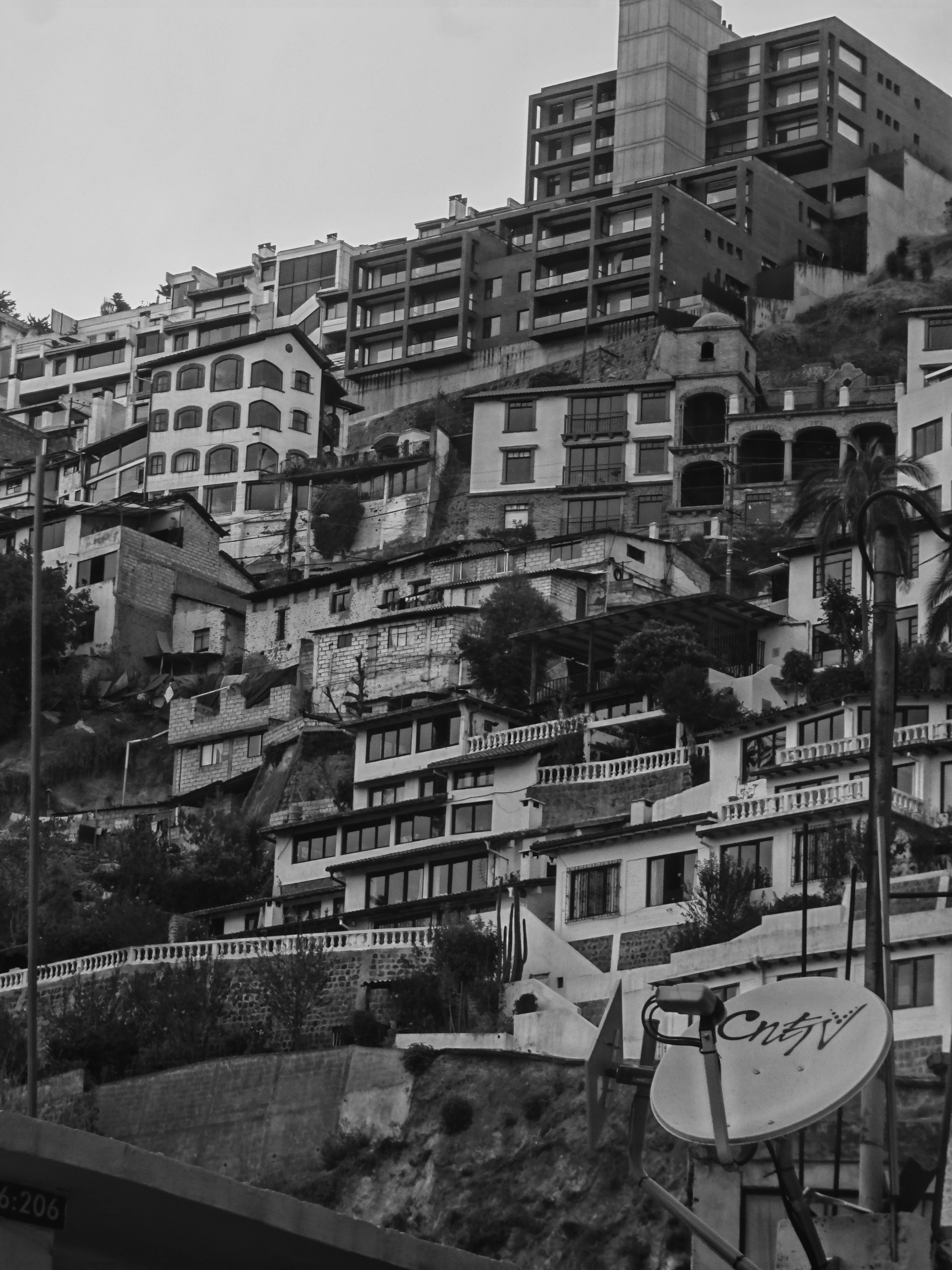

Guápulo is a district of Quito, Ecuador, also called an electoral parish (parroquia electoral urbana). The parish was established as a result of the October 2004 political elections when the city was divided into 19 urban electoral parishes. Set behind Hotel Quito, the neighborhood of Guápulo runs down the winding Camino de Orellana, from González Suárez to Calle de los Conquistadores, the main road out of Quito and to the neighboring suburbs. Often considered an artsy, bohemian neighborhood of Quito, Guápulo is home to many local artists and a couple of hippy cafés/bars. Every year on September 7 the guapuleños honor their neighborhood with the Fiestas de Guápulo, a fantastic celebration complete with costumes, parade, food, drink, song, dance, and fireworks.

Guápulo Park is a 19.5 hectares, 48 acre public park. The park is administered by the Public Sector under the Parks and Public Spaces Urban Spaces that is under the National Plan for Good Living as to the creation of green spaces for cultural practices, recreational and sports activities.

Originally Guápulo was founded as an independent city by the Spaniards. It is told that on December 30, 1696, the miracle of Our Lady of the Cloud took place on the way between Quito and Guápulo.

On Thursday, March 19, 2009, CNN reported that a small Beechcraft military plane had crashed into a section of the district, killing the three occupants of the plane and three on the ground in a building.

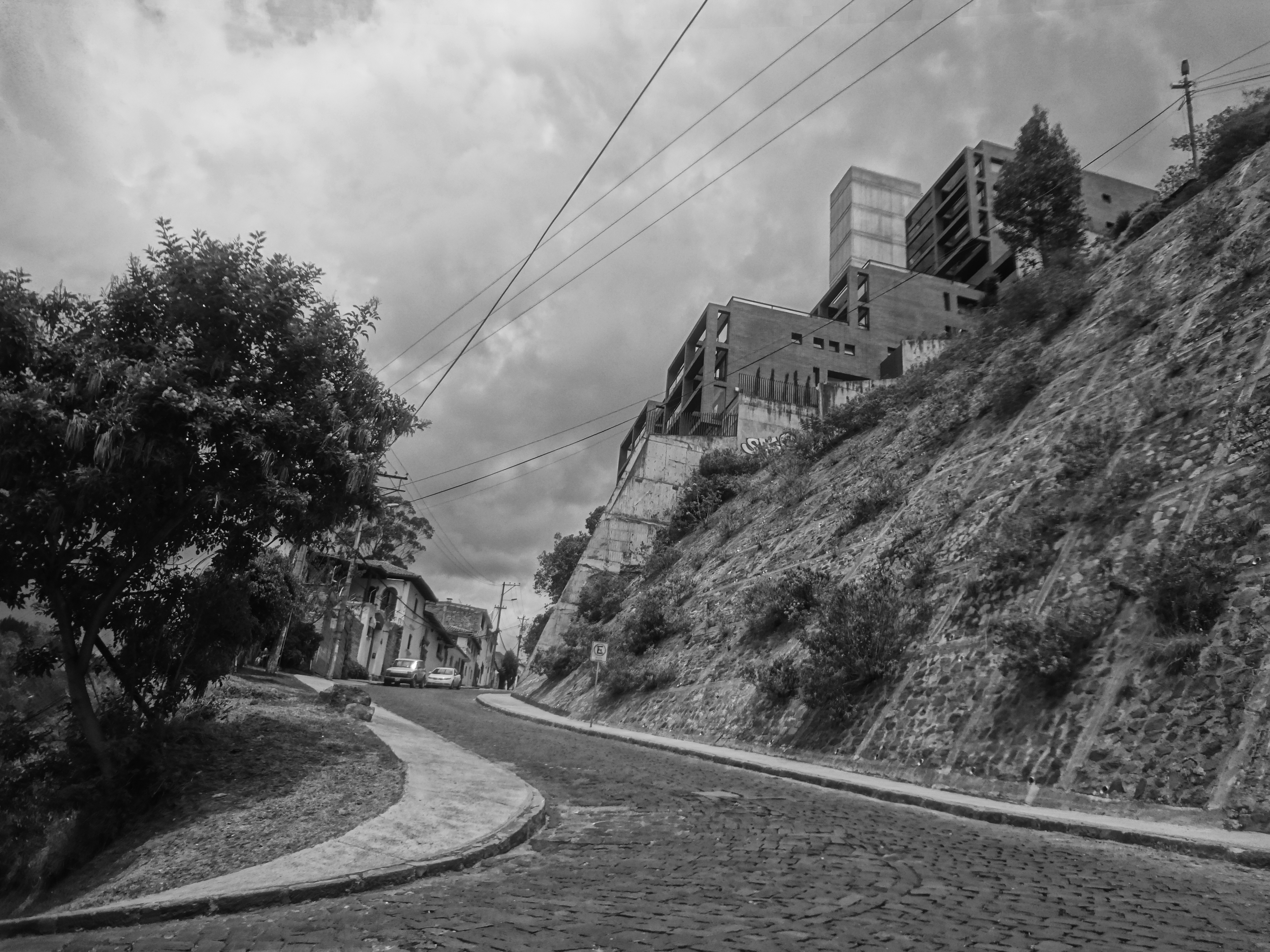

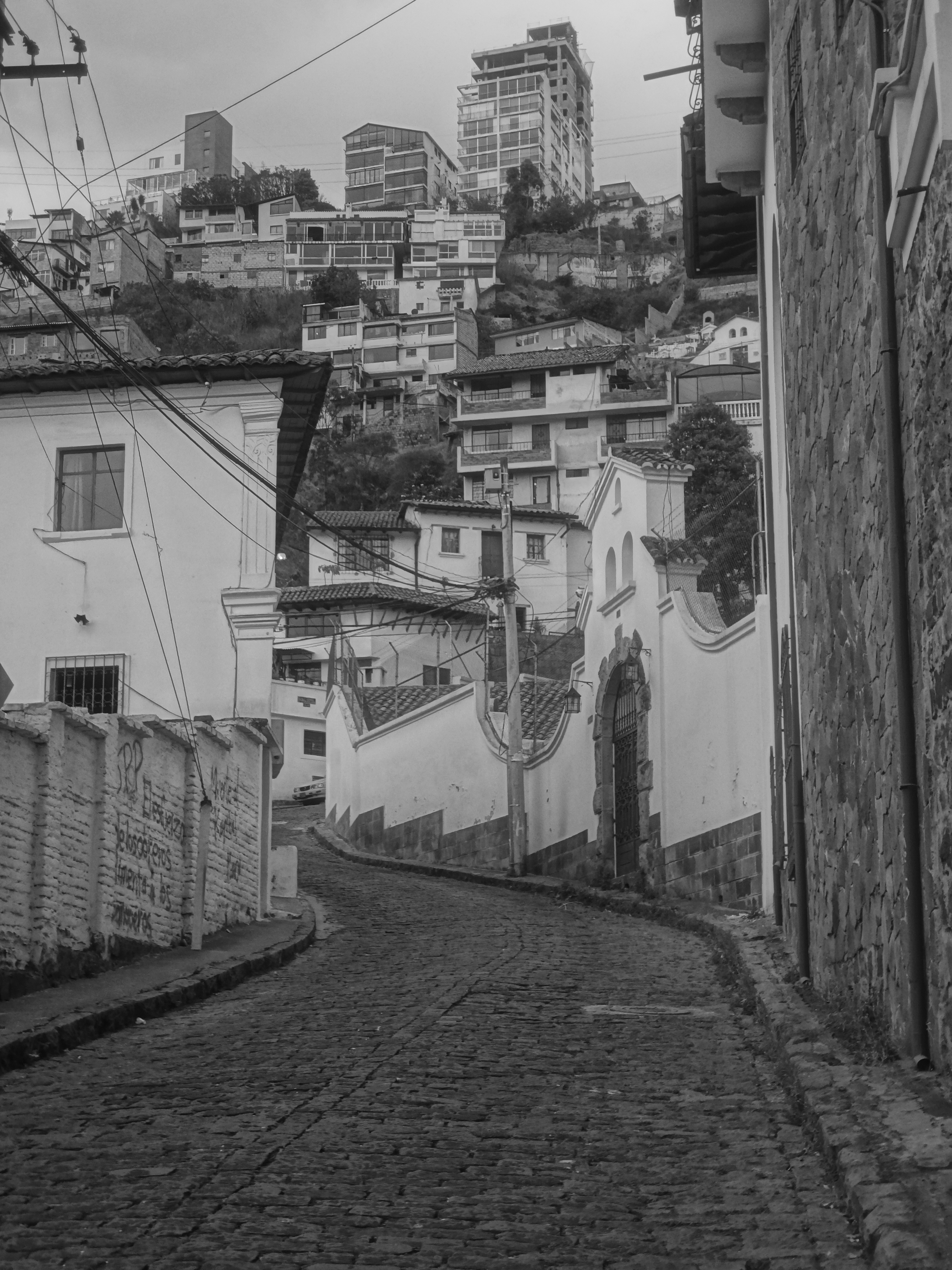

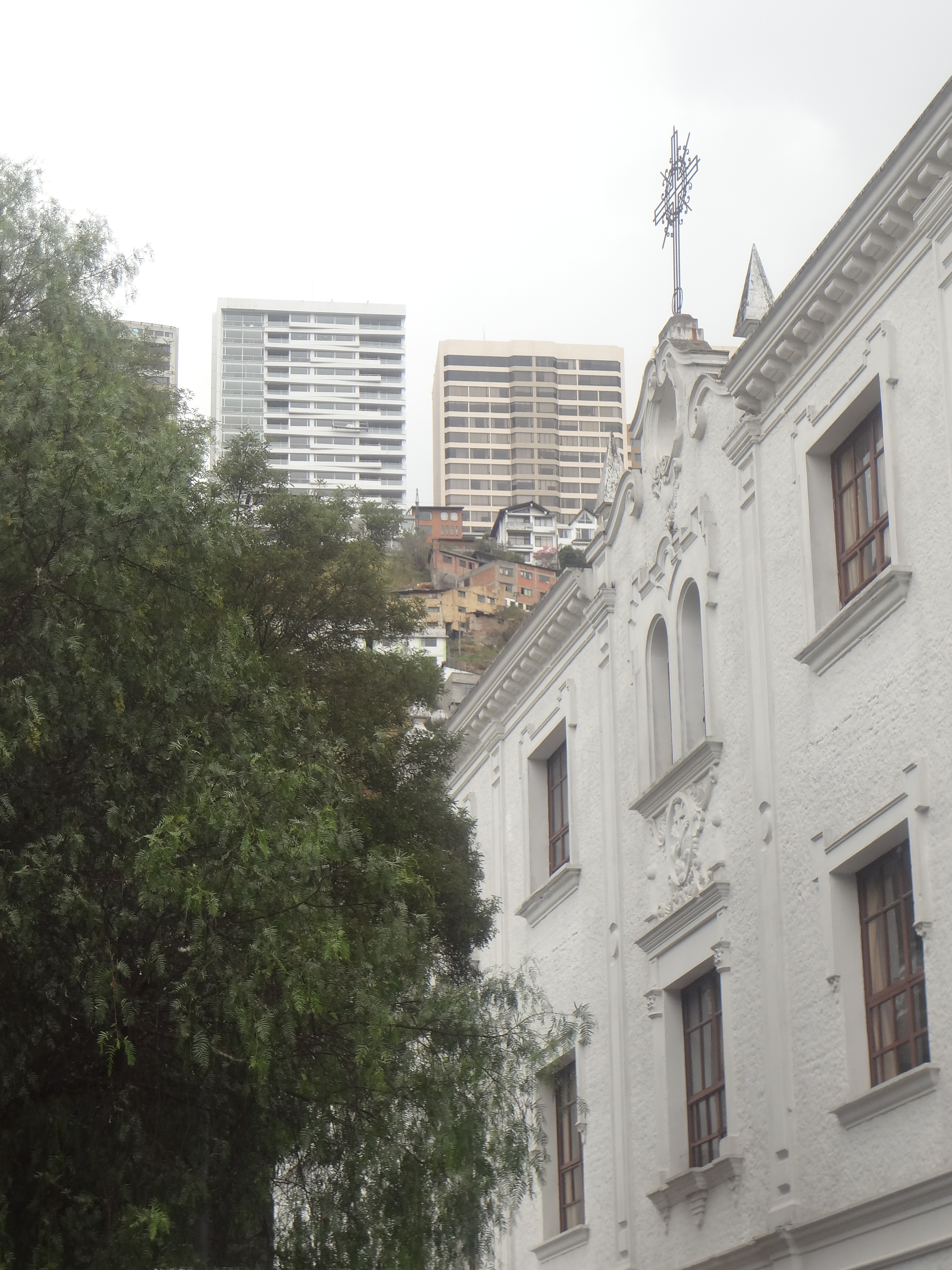

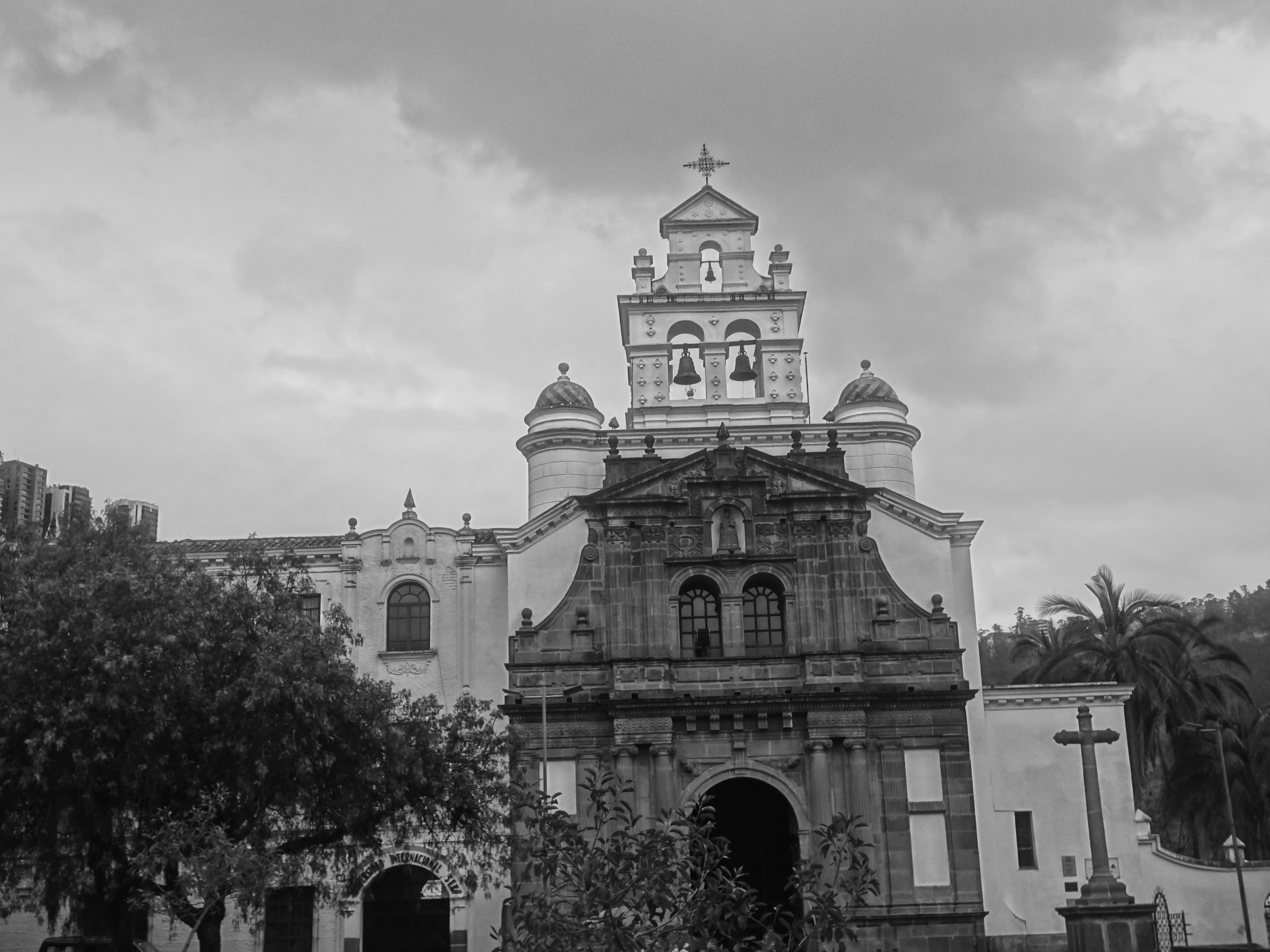

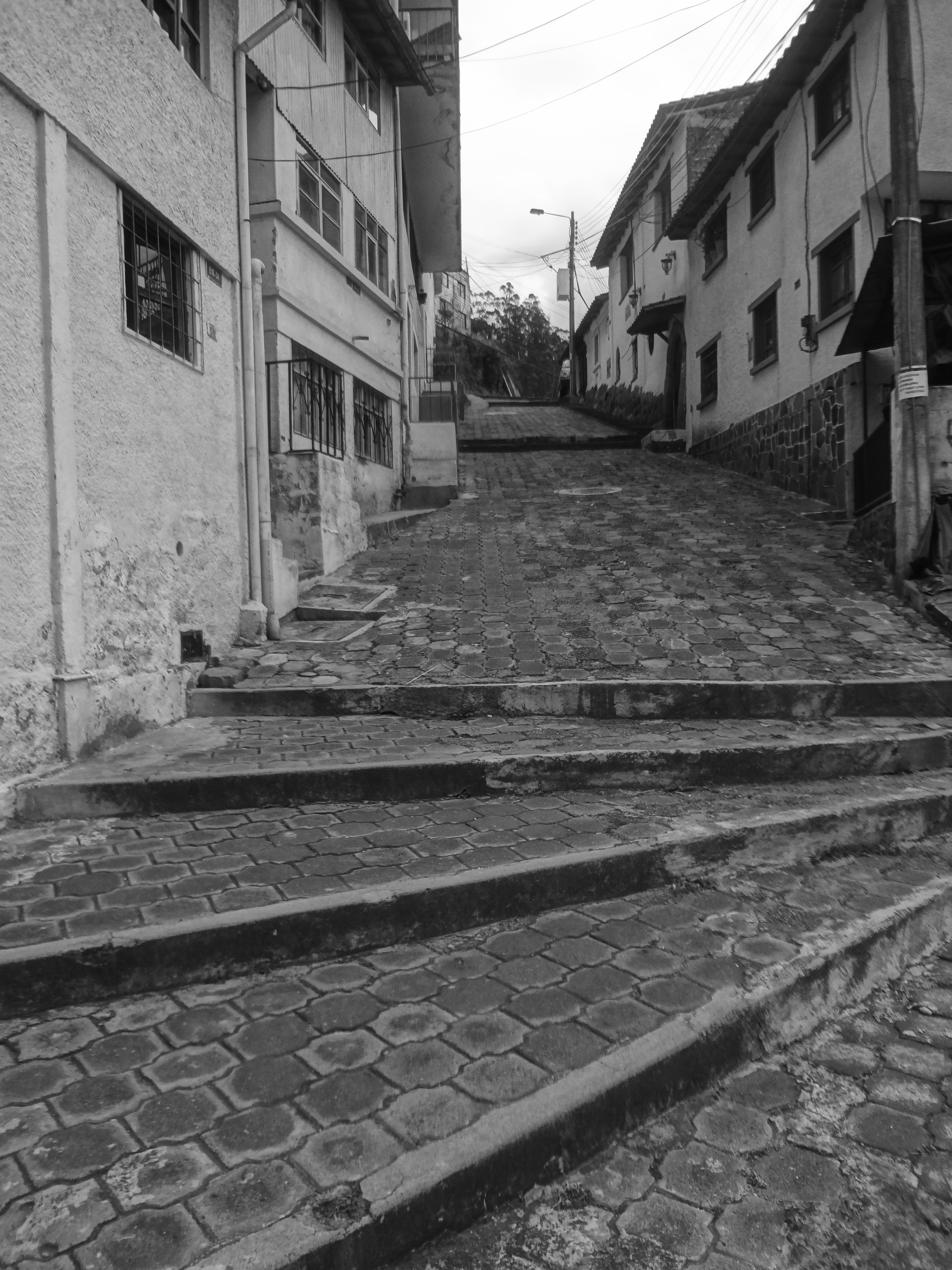

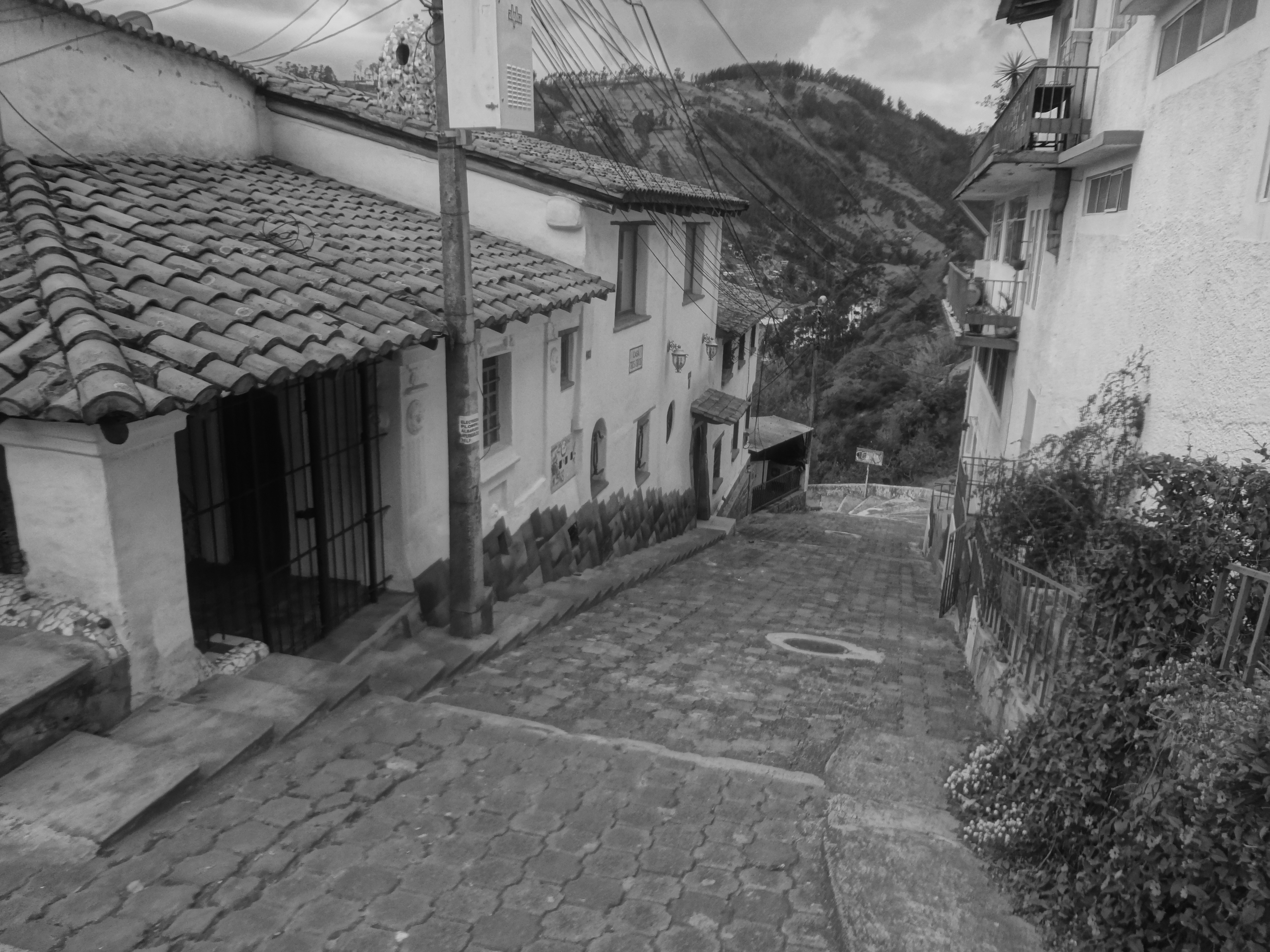

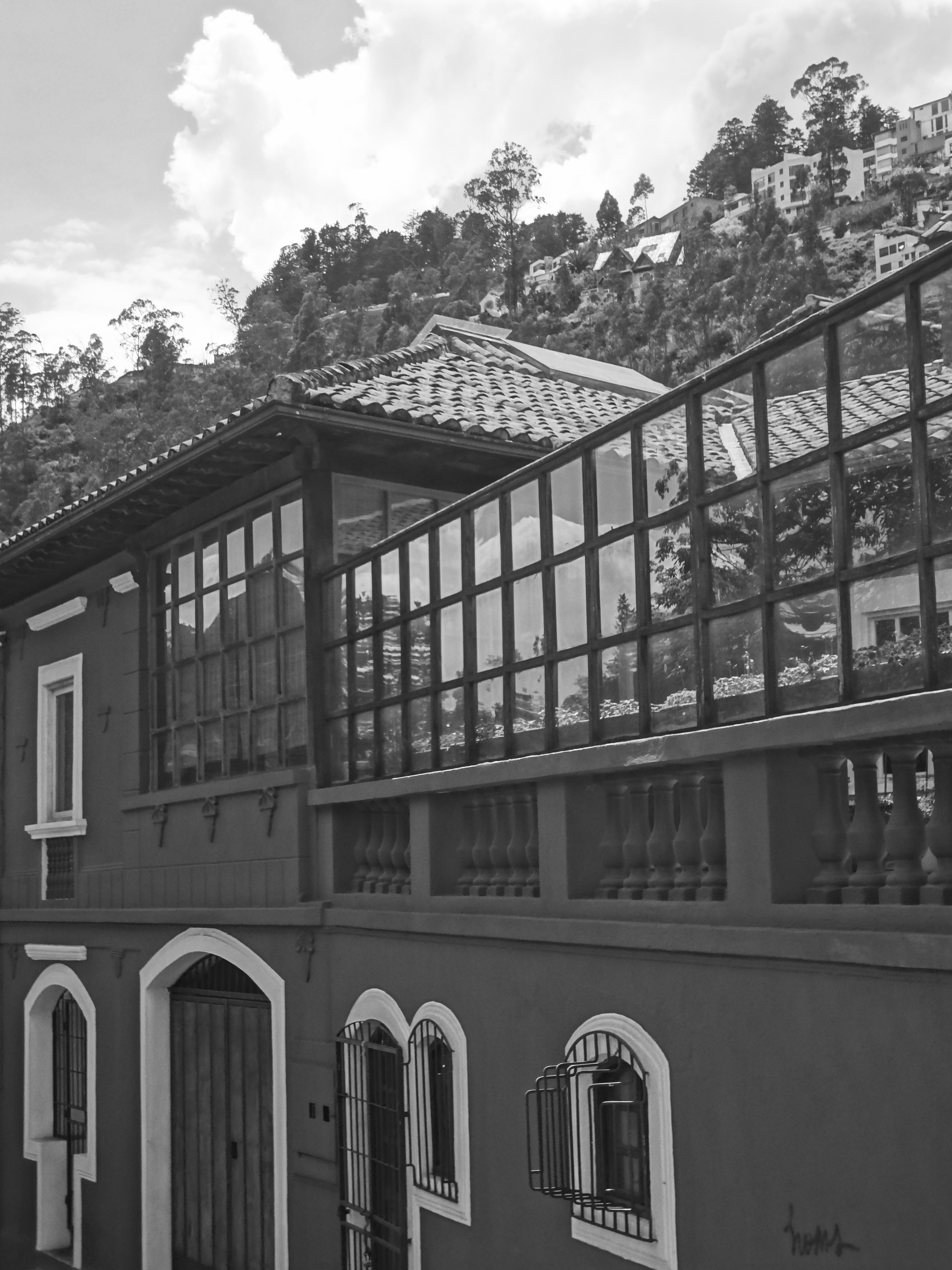

== See also ==
- Shrine of the Virgin of Guápulo
