= Yauca District =

Yauca
- District
- Interactive map of Yauca
- Coordinates: 15°39′41″S 74°31′33″W
- Country: Peru
- Region: Arequipa
- Province: Caravelí
- Founded: January 2, 1857
- Capital: Yauca

Government
  - Mayor: Juan Flavio Aranguren Montoya

Area
  - Total: 556.3 km^{2} (214.8 sq mi)
- Elevation: 22 m (72 ft)

Population (2005 census)
  - Total: 1,805
  - Density: 3.245/km^{2} (8.404/sq mi)
- Time zone: UTC-5 (PET)
- UBIGEO: 040313

Yauca District is one of thirteen districts of the province Caravelí in Peru. The district is located on the Pan-American Highway.
