= Chaparra District =

Coordinates: 15.7419°S 73.8816°W

Chaparra
- District
- Interactive map of Chaparra
- Country: Peru
- Region: Arequipa
- Province: Caravelí
- Capital: Achanizo

Government
  - Mayor: Juan Carlos De La Torre Carcamo

Area
  - Total: 1,473.19 km^{2} (568.80 sq mi)
- Elevation: 600 m (2,000 ft)

Population (2005 census)
  - Total: 3,354
  - Density: 2.277/km^{2} (5.897/sq mi)
- Time zone: UTC-5 (PET)
- UBIGEO: 040308

Chaparra District is one of thirteen districts of the province Caravelí in Peru.
