= Acarí District =

Coordinates: 15.4384°S 74.6173°W

Acarí
- District
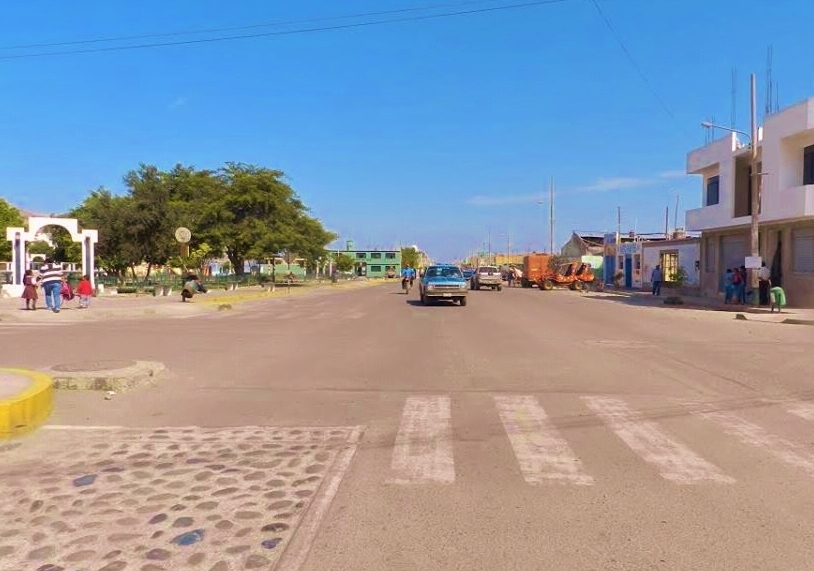
- A street in Acarí
- Interactive map of Acarí
- Country: Peru
- Region: Arequipa
- Province: Caravelí
- Capital: Acarí

Government
  - Mayor: Jorge Alfonso De La Torre Velarde

Area
  - Total: 799.21 km^{2} (308.58 sq mi)
- Elevation: 163 m (535 ft)

Population (2005 census)
  - Total: 3,899
  - Density: 4.879/km^{2} (12.64/sq mi)
- Time zone: UTC-5 (PET)
- UBIGEO: 040302

Acarí District is one of thirteen districts of the Caravelí province in Peru.

== Localities ==
- Vijoto
- Chocavento
- El Molino
- Otapara
- Amato
- Huarato
- Machaynioc
- Malco

== See also ==
- Caravelí Province
- Archaeological site Tambo Viejo
