= Kukuli, Arequipa =

Archaeological site in Peru

Kukuli
- Location: Peru, Arequipa Region, Caravelí Province
- Region: Andes

Kukuli (Quechua for white-winged dove) is an archaeological site with rock paintings and tombs in Peru. It is located in the Arequipa Region, Caravelí Province, Caravelí District.
