= Tambo Viejo =

Archaeological site in Peru

- Tambo Viejo
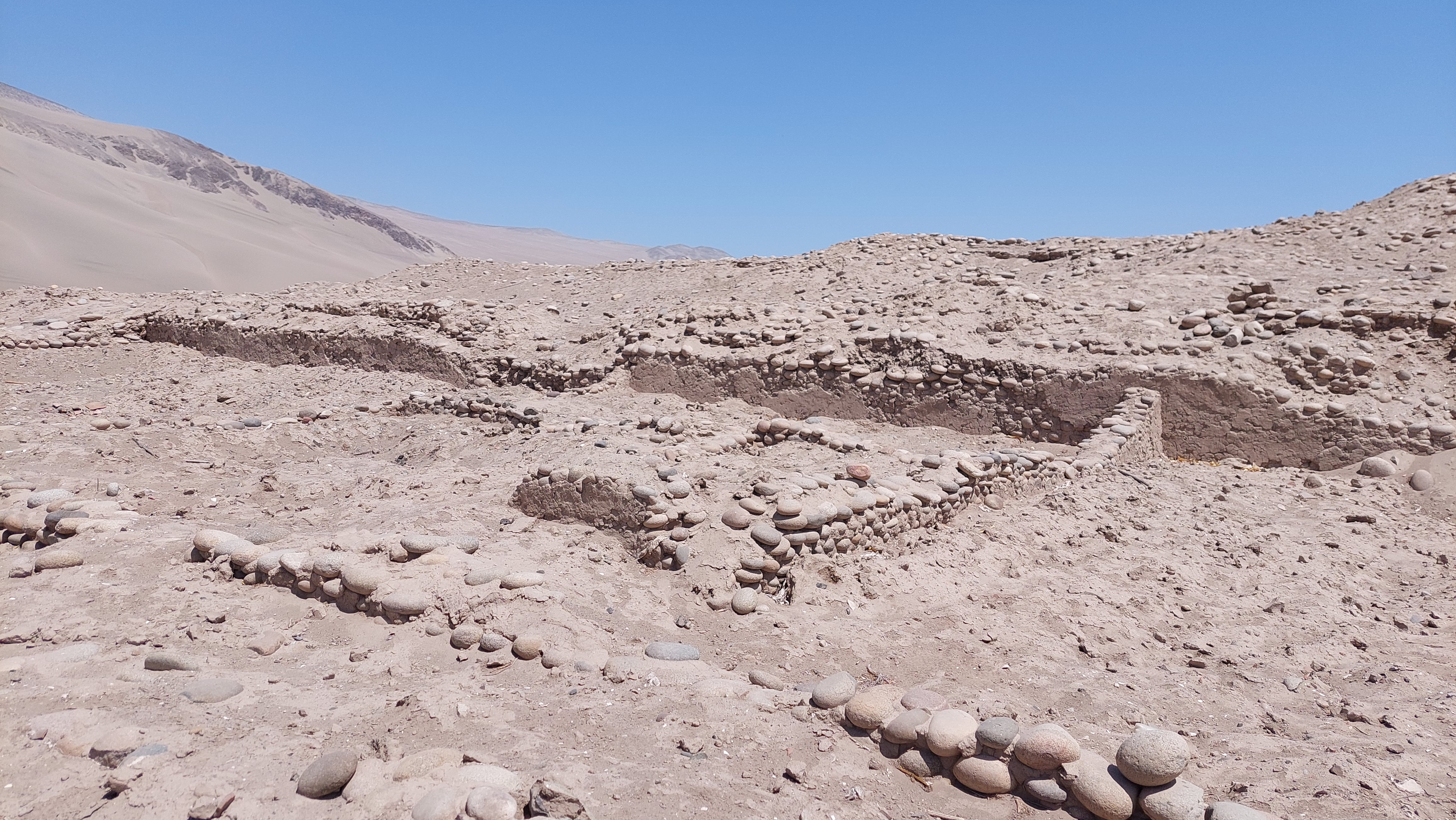
- Tambo Viejo in 2022

- Location within Peru
- 15°26′55″S 74°36′59″W
- Type: Settlement

Tambo Viejo is an archaeological site that extends over approximately 44 hectares (110 acres) in the north of the Arequipa region of southern Peru. The site presents evidence of human occupation from the Early Intermediate period, including examples of Early Nasca pottery, to structures of the Inca period and remains from the Spanish colonial period.

== Location ==
The archaeological site of Tambo Viejo is located at 20 km from the sea and immediately south of the current town of Acarí, Caravelí province, Arequipa region, in southwestern Peru.

== History ==
Tambo Viejo in the Acari Valley, is one of several provincial administrative centers established by the Incas on the southern Peruvian coast, including Tambo Colorado and Lima la Vieja in the Pisco Valley, Ica Vieja in the Ica Valley, and Tambo de Collao in the Ingenio valley, as well as Paredones in the Nasca Valley. All these centers, apparently created by the Incas, were connected to each other thanks to the Inca trail that crosses the Peruvian coast.

The first archaeological investigations in Tambo Viejo were carried out in 1954 by Dorothy Menzel and Francis A. Riddell, who noted that Tambo Viejo was an Inca center protected by walls. They also noted that the site had a long history of occupation, as they found pottery from the Early Nasca period of the Early Intermediate period.

Subsequently, the investigations continued, in particular by Lidio Valdez who investigated Tambo Viejo and the Acari Valley in general. Thanks to this information the situation of the site and by extension of the Acari Valley at the time of the Inca occupation are better understood.

== Findings ==
Tambo Viejo is oriented in a north–south direction. The main area on its north side is a large rectangular plaza, known as Plaza Principal or Plaza 1. From its southwest corner there is a part of the Inca trail that leads to Paredones; for this reason, it is assumed that this was the point of entry to Tambo Viejo.

The southern part of Tambo Viejo is made up of a labyrinth of structures connected to a smaller, more central plaza (Plaza 2), around which there are rectangular structures of various sizes. To the south of the plaza there is a large platform, apparently artificial, that dominates the entire site and on the top of this platform there are remains of aligned wood columns that could have been used to support a roof. To the north of this plaza is another, smaller platform, similar to the main platform, and to the east of the plaza there are structures that appear to have also been built on a mound. All these structures suggest that Plaza 2 was a sheltered place and not visible from the Inca trail.

The walls of the Tambo Viejo buildings were built with two rows of boulders joined with mortar, with the exterior face plastered to create a uniform surface to which were added rectangular adobe bricks, many of which have collapsed over time. The fact that there are no trapezoidal windows, niches or doors would seem to indicate that the architects responsible for Tambo Viejo were local and less familiar with Inca aesthetic canons.

During recent excavations, four naturally mummified llamas and another in a state of decomposition were found under the pavement of one of the corners of the main square, showing in good condition the ornaments with which they were adorned for a sacrificial ceremony, including earrings, bracelets and necklaces, as well as a hundred offerings of cuyes (guinea pigs). The graves were marked with feathers of tropical birds. The guinea pigs were found in two different places, with adornments similar to those of the llamas, and some of them were wrapped in carpets before burial. The remains of a dog were also found buried in direction to the east.

Recent excavations near Plaza 2 found some artefacts used for the game of pichqa (the number five in Quechua), which consists of a die with different markings on five of its faces, as well as clay ovens that seem to have been used to roast meals on special occasions, which presents evidence of the type of socialization of the Inca culture in an administrative center such as Tambo Viejo.

== Gallery ==
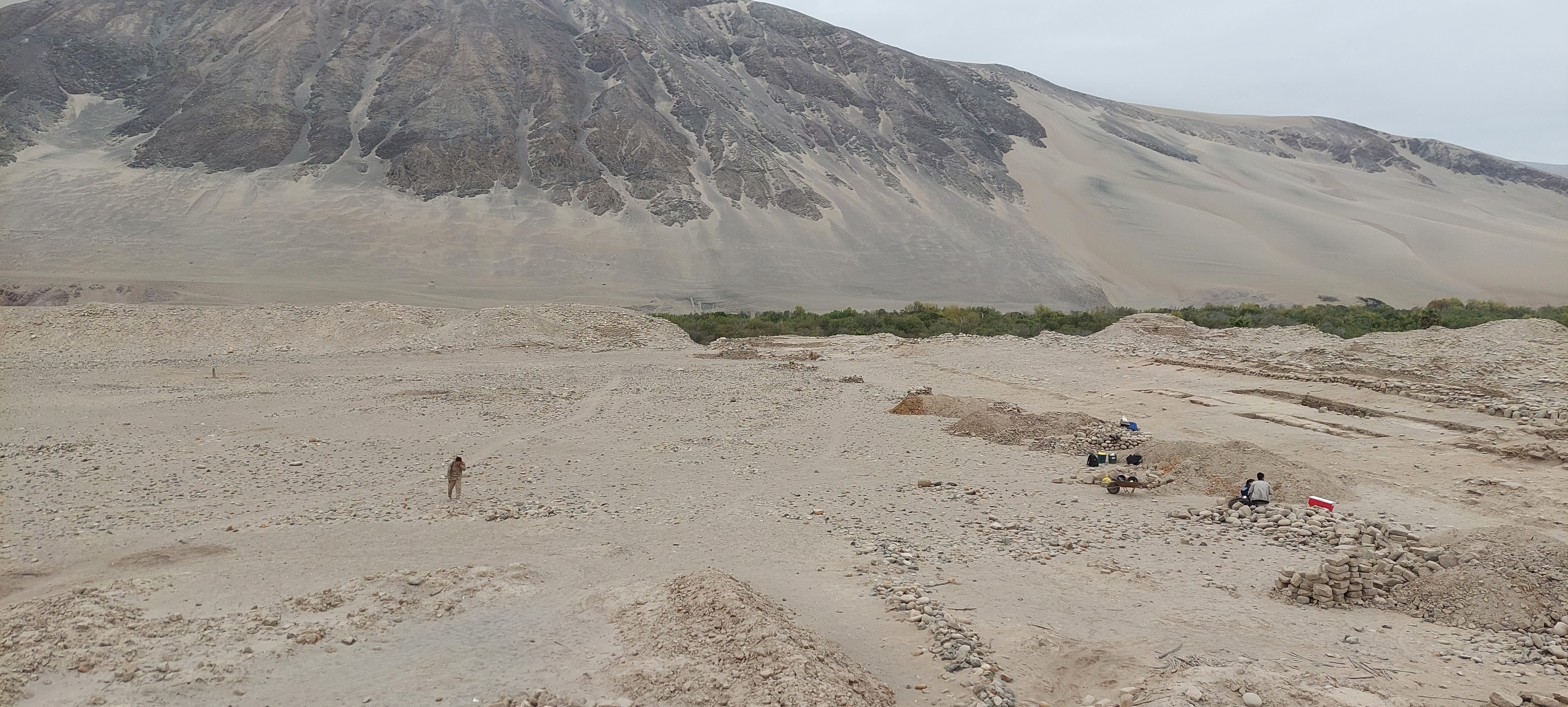
Plaza 1 in Tambo Viejo, in 2022

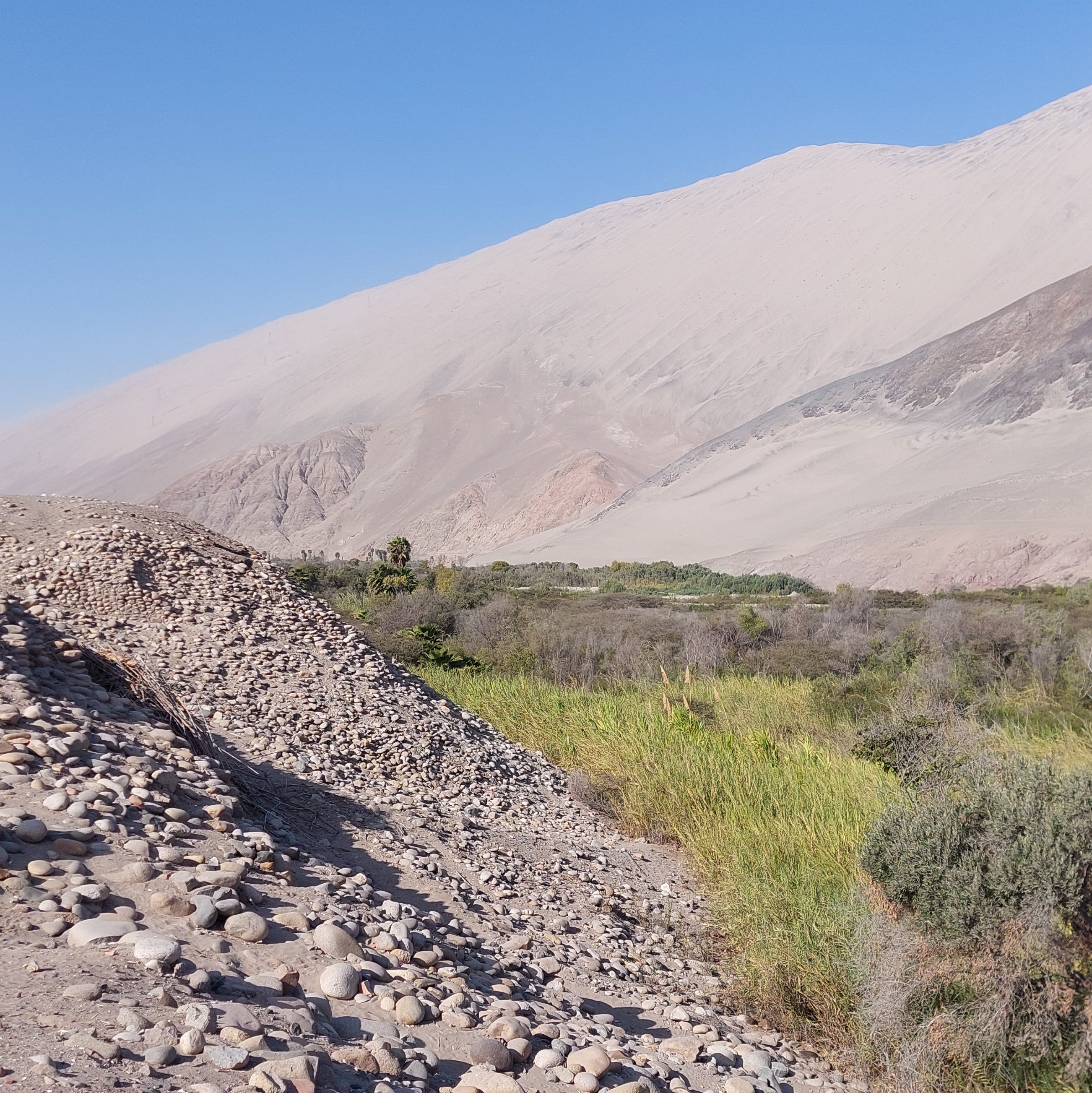
External walls, Tambo Viejo, in 2022

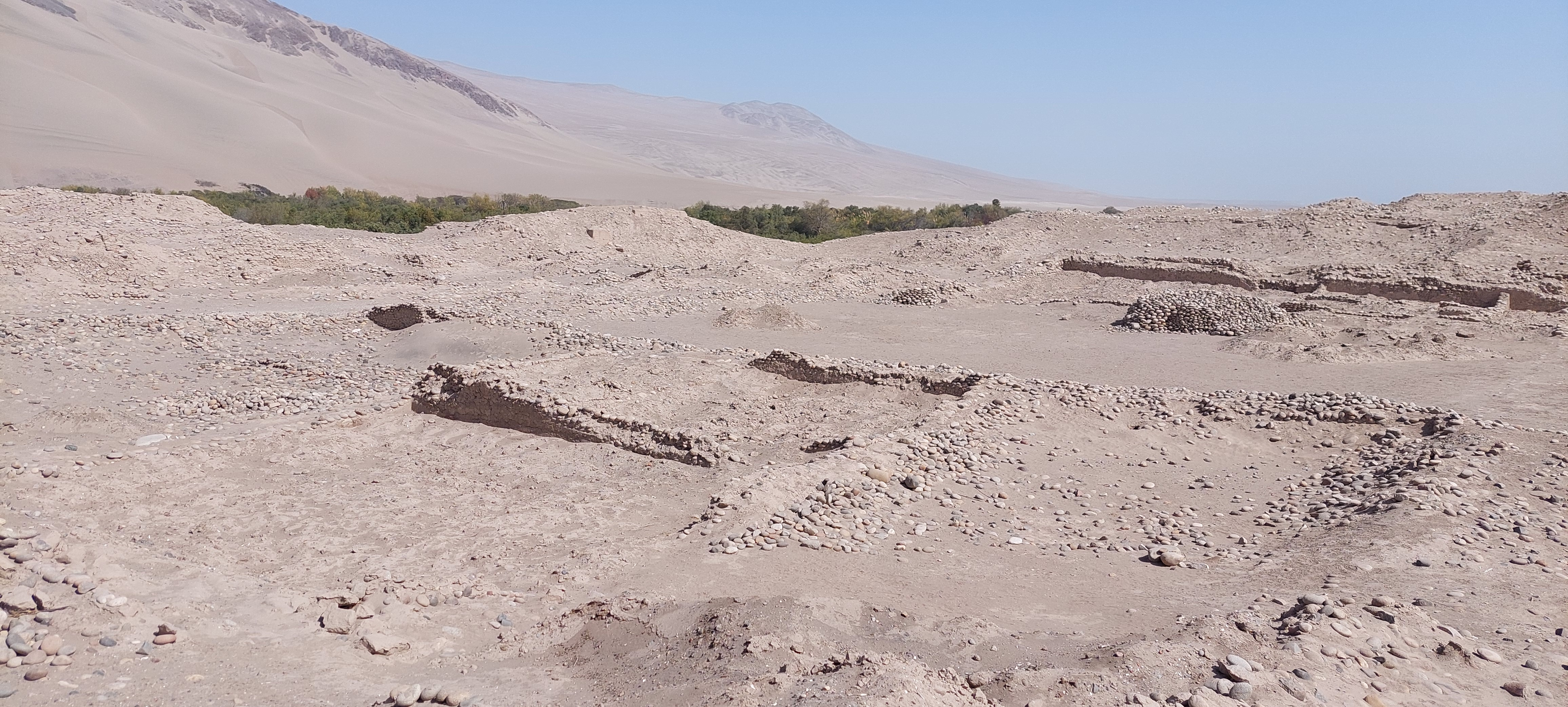
Plaza 2 in Tambo Viejo, in 2022

== See also ==
- Acarí District
- Nazca culture
- Inca empire
