= Caravelí =

- Village
- Location within Peru
- Coordinates: 15°46′21.95″S 73°21′56.79″W
- Country: Peru
- Region: Arequipa
- Province: Caravelí
- District: Caravelí

Government
  - Mayor: Arturo Roberto Soto Riveros (2023-2027)
- Elevation: 1,779 m (5,837 ft)

Population (2017)
  - Total: 5,000
- Time zone: UTC-5 (PET)

Caravelí is a town in Southern Peru. It is the capital of the province Caravelí, in the region Arequipa.

Its Catedral San Pedro, dedicated to Saint Peter, is the seat of the pre-diocesan Territorial Prelature of Caravelí.
