= Lord of Miracles =

Image of Jesus Christ in Lima, Peru

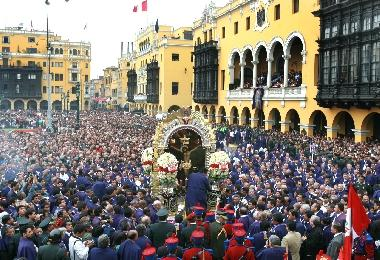
- Annual procession in commemoration of the Lord of Miracles at Plaza Mayor in Lima, Peru
- Official name: Señor de Los Milagros
- Also called: Feast of the Lord of Miracles; Señor de Los Milagros; El Señor de Los Milagros
- Observed by: Peruvians and people of Peruvian descent; Catholic Church (see calendar)
- Type: Ethnic, national, Christian
- Celebrations: Attending processions; Wearing crucifix; Wearing purple; Attire
- Observances: Attending mass or service
- Date: 18 October
- Next time: 18 October 2027
- Duration: all month
- Frequency: Annual
- First time: 1655

Cultural Heritage of Peru
- Official name: Festividad del Señor de los Milagros
- Type: Intangible
- Criteria: Festivals and ritual celebrations
- Designated: 27 October 2005; 21 years ago
- Legal basis: RDN 1454/INC-2005

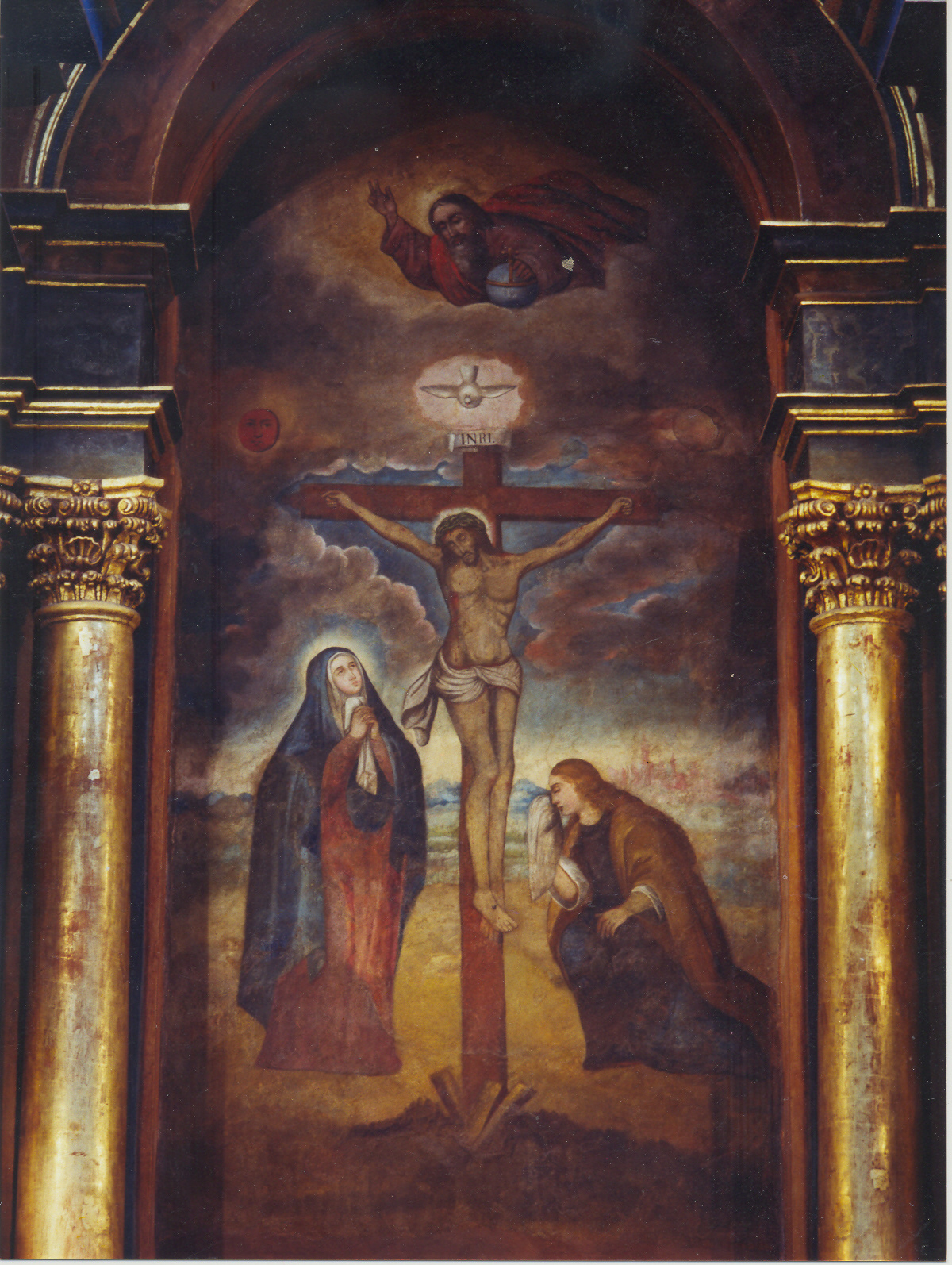
Mural of the Señor de los Milagros painted in Sanctuary of Las Nazarenas at Lima in Peru

The Lord of Miracles (Spanish: Señor de los Milagros), also known as Christ of Miracles, is a Catholic devotion and title of Jesus Christ that is associated with a painting of Christ crucified venerated in Lima, Peru. The image was painted during the 17th century by Benito or Pedro Dalcon, sometimes also referred to as Pedro Villagómez, an African taken from what is now Angola to Peru as a slave. An annual procession commemorating the image occurs every October. It is one of the oldest Catholic traditions in Peru and among the largest religious processions in the world.

== Description of the Image ==
Jesus Christ is depicted crucified, with the Holy Spirit and God the Father above. On the left is the Virgin Mary as the Sorrowful Mother, and on the right is a weeping Mary Magdalene daubing her eyes with a handkerchief.

Its name originated in the 17 and 18th centuries, after earthquakes in 1655, 1687, and 1746 destroyed most of the city, leaving only the mural standing. This considered a miraculous occurrence by many living there. What began as an Afro-Peruvian devotion was increasingly adopted by the Creole middle class in the 18th century after the third earthquake, which destroyed the city of Lima and much of the coast what is now the department of Lima and its provinces from Chancay to Cañete. Its chapel was made a Peruvian Cultural Heritage in 1972 and later on a UNESCO World Heritage Site in 1991.

So much was the impact of the devotion that in 1715 the City Council of Lima officially declared Christ, the Lord of Miracles, as Patron and Protector of the City of Lima, and in 2005, the Holy See officially granted it the title of Patron of the Peruvian People and the Peruvian Overseas Diaspora given the growth of the devotion outside the capital to many countries in the world. This was the same year the Government of Peru honored the centuries-old festivities with the honor of being a Cultural Heritage of Peru, worthy of protection and preservation by both the Peruvian nation and people.

In 2010, the late President Alan García and Prime Minister Javier Velásquez Quesquén officially designated the icon as Patron of the Peruvian Catholic Church, the official recognition occurring on October 18, the day of the traditional second major procession of the icons in the capital when a Government Resolution to that effect was made public.

In 2026, the Andean Parliament honored the image with the title "Cultural and Religious Heritage of the Andes".

== Veneration ==
Every year in October, hundreds of thousands of pilgrims from all walks of life participate in religious processions held on the first weekend, 18th and 19th, and 28th of October and on All Saints' Day, 1 November, honoring both the image and that of Our Lady of the Cloud through the streets of downtown Lima. These constitute one of the biggest Catholic processions of their kind in the world and in the Americas. The first and final processions are those that begin and end from the Sanctuary and Monastery of Las Nazarenas, where the original icon has been enshrined since its completion. The image on procession is a replica of the original which is mounted on a special pallanquin that is brought out on the mentioned days by men of the Confraternity of the Lord of Miracles of Nazarenas, via its 20 cuadrillas and the Honored Hermanos Group all responsible for the handlers of the images, which change during the procession proper. And in front of them are the well-known female thurifers (sahumadores) carrying handheld censer, wearing purple clothing and with mantillas as they walk backwards facing the icon and censing it during the processions. During all these, the official Hymn to the Lord of Miracles, composed by Isabel Rodríguez-Larraín Pendergast, is sung alongside other holiday-themed music praising the image, inclusive of the March of the Lord of Miracles composed by Peruvian composer José Sabas Libornio Ibarra, the first true Peruvian processional march, played by marching bands.

The predominant color for the procession and the habits are purple with white rope. The processions' route circles downtown Lima and takes approximately 20 hours to complete. In the main plaza of Lima during the mid-October profession, the image is honored in three different buildings in the Plaza Mayor, by the President of Peru, The Mayor of Lima, and the Archbishop of Lima in their respective buildings. Prior to this, the National Congress and Federico Villarreal National University honor the procession. Along its path, people release purple and white balloons and throw flowers and confetti, while fireworks displays accompany the image during the evening hours. In addition, the National Police, Firefighters Corps and various public and private institutions also honor the image when it stops by.

In addition to the main Lima procession, there are also processions held all over Peru in honor of the icon, as well as overseas events organized by the Peruvian diaspora across the globe.

In Peru, the month of October is known as the purple month due to the colors of the procession. There are seasonal delicious sweets like mazamorra morada ("purple pudding") and Turrón de Doña Pepa that are very traditional for October traditions related to the history of the procession.

"The Fair of The Lord of The Miracles" is a celebration of bullfights since 1946, gathering the best bullfighters of the world, the months of October, November, and the first days of December, competing for "The Golden and Silver Scapulars of The Lord of the Miracles," taking place in the Acho Bullring in Lima.

== See also ==
- Lord of Miracles of Buga
- Roman Catholicism in Peru
  - Virgin of Chapi
