= Acarí =

Coordinates: 15°26′S 74°37′W

Acarí is a town in the Arequipa region of Peru. It has a population of 4,445 and sits at an elevation of 410 meters (1,350 ft). The town was near the epicenter of a magnitude 7.1 earthquake on January 14, 2018.
