= St Mathias' Church, Ballydehob =

Anglican church in County Cork, Ireland

Coordinates: 51.56436°N 9.46743°W

St Matthias’ Church
- St Matthias’ Church
- Country: Ireland
- Denomination: Church of Ireland

History
- Consecrated: 1829

Architecture
- Architect(s): Joseph Welland (possibly); Welland & Fillespie (c.1869)

Clergy
- Rector: Steve McCann

St Matthias’ Church is a small Gothic Revival Anglican church located in Ballydehob, County Cork, Ireland. It was completed in 1829. It is dedicated to Saint Matthias. Along with Saint Matthew's Church in Aughadown, it is part of the Ballydehob Union of Parishes in the Diocese of Cork, Cloyne, and Ross.

== History ==
St Matthias’ Church was opened and consecrated in 1829. It was funded by a loan from the Board of First Fruits, and was likely designed by architect Joseph Welland. The chancel was added around 1852.

Originally a chapel of Ease for Holy Trinity Church in Schull, it was separated from Schull parish in roughly 1869. Following the split, the church was extended by architects Welland & Gillespie. In the 1860s it was further extended, with the 1829 building now forming the centre of a larger construction.

Steve McCann currently serves as rector of the parish.

== Architecture ==
The chapel feature an octagonal marble baptismal font, created in 1888, which rests on red marble colonnettes. The east window depicts Jesus Christ as the Light of the World in stained-glass, and was made by Clokey & Co in 1945. It is dedicated to the memory of Joe Young.
