= St Senan's Church, Inniscarra =

Anglican church in Cork, Ireland

Coordinates: 51°54′25″N 8°39′00″W

St Senan's Church
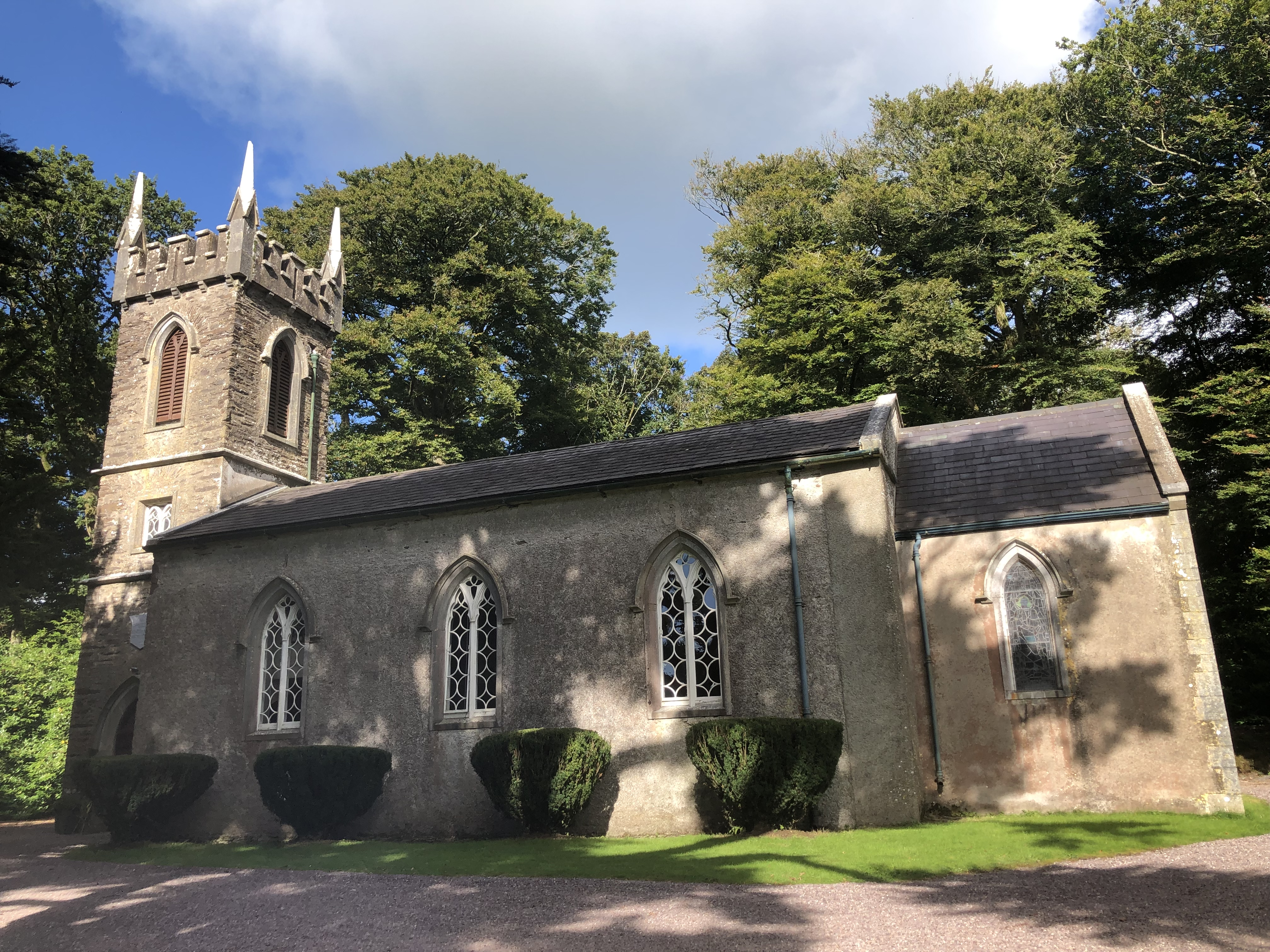
- Country: Ireland
- Denomination: Church of Ireland
- Website: cupcork.ie

Architecture
- Architect(s): George Beale
- Style: Gothic Revival

Clergy
- Rector: Robert Ferris

St Senan's Church is a small Anglican Gothic Revival church located in Inniscarra, County Cork, Ireland. It is dedicated to Senán mac Geirrcinn, who is the patron saint of Inniscarra.

Along with the Church of Saint Peter in Carrigrohane and the Church of the Resurrection in Blarney, it is part of the Carrigrohane Union of Parishes in the Diocese of Cork, Cloyne, and Ross.

== Old church ==
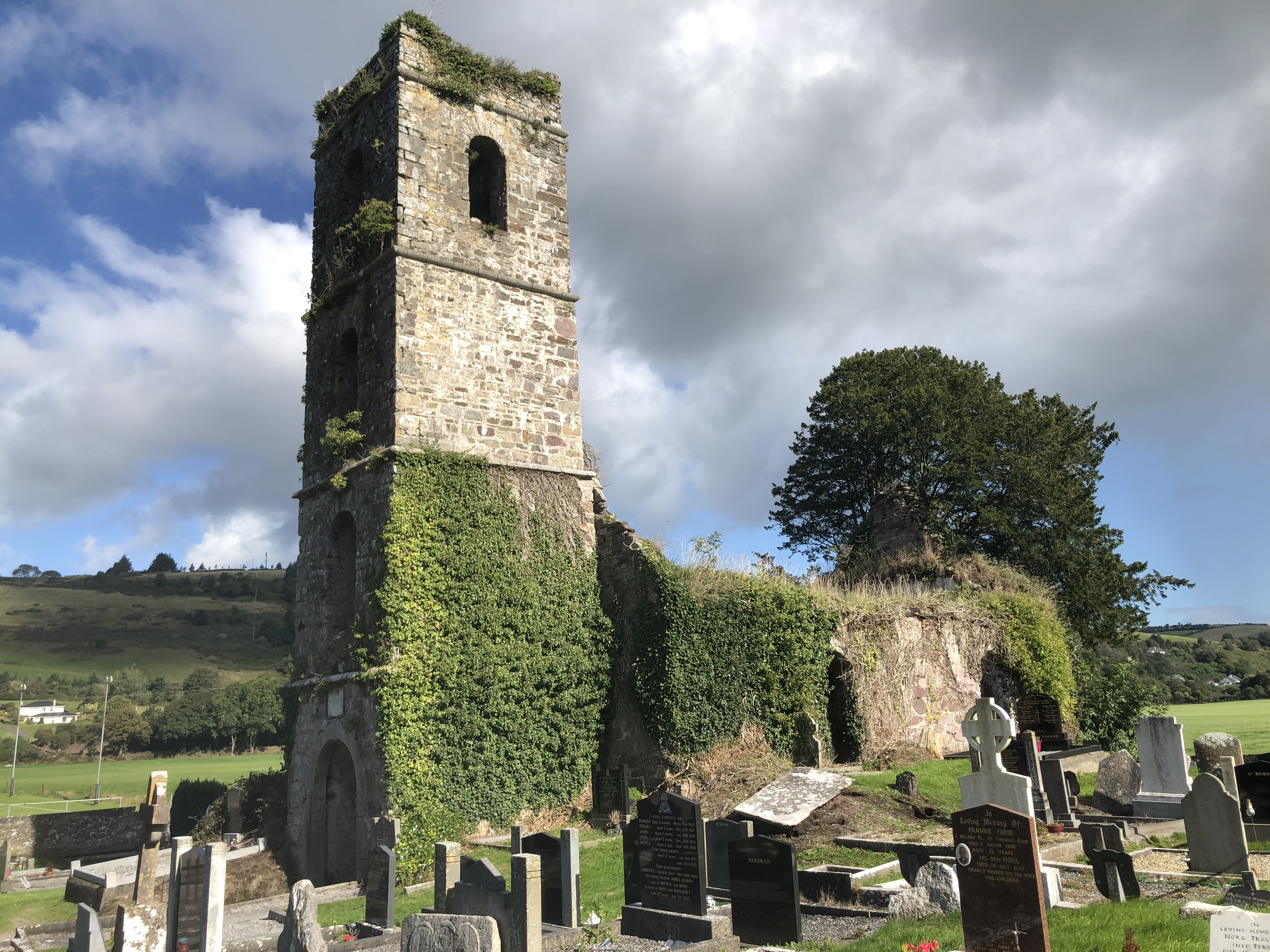
The nearby ruin of the old St Senan's church

The church was built to replace an earlier church nearby. This early church was built in the Early Georgian period, with a tower being added in 1756 by the Church of Ireland rector after the building was confiscated from the Catholic Church. It was abandoned after the construction of St Senan's, and is now a ruin. It sits on the site of a 6th-century church founded by St Senan. The original site selected by the monk was then called Tuaim nAba, and was situated between three River Lee channels which many centuries later were made into one during the construction of the Ballincollig Royal Gunpowder Mills. The place currently referred to the Inniscarra Graveyard, or just St. Senan's, was first a monastery, founded by St. Senan in 523 or 530. The settlement consisted of a number of monastic huts. The St Senan's church was built later, and changed hands between Catholics and Protestants.

One of the notable persons buried in the graveyard was Thomas Tobin, a British merchant who played an important role in the history of the nearby Ballincollig. The graveyard, with separately designated protestant section, is not used as an active burial place anymore due to the lack of space, but is still a frequent day-trip destination due to its picturesque location by River Lee's turn. Rowing and rafting competitions have often had their starting point at that spot of the river. With the site being distanced from the road and village, there are frequent garbage dumping incidents there.

== New church ==
St Senan's was built in 1819, at a cost of IR£923. The Board of First Fruits supplied the loan. The bell from the original church currently hangs in the new building.

Reverend George de la Poer Beresford was the first rector of the church. He was succeeded by his son, Reverend William Beresford, who was eventually stripped of his position by the Archbishop of Dublin and deported to Australia.

The interior was refitted by William Henry Hill in 1873. A chancel, also designed by Hill, was added to the building between 1892 and 1893.

In 1994, the 125-year-old organ from Christ Church, Magourney, was transferred to St Senan's after Christ Church was deconsecrated. The organ was restored to working order.

In 2012, the church was extended to include what is referred to as "the Glade".

Robert Ferris became the rector of the parish in 2020, having been Associate Minister there for eight years prior to his promotion.

== Architecture ==
St Senan's was designed by George Beale, and is built in the Gothic Revival style.

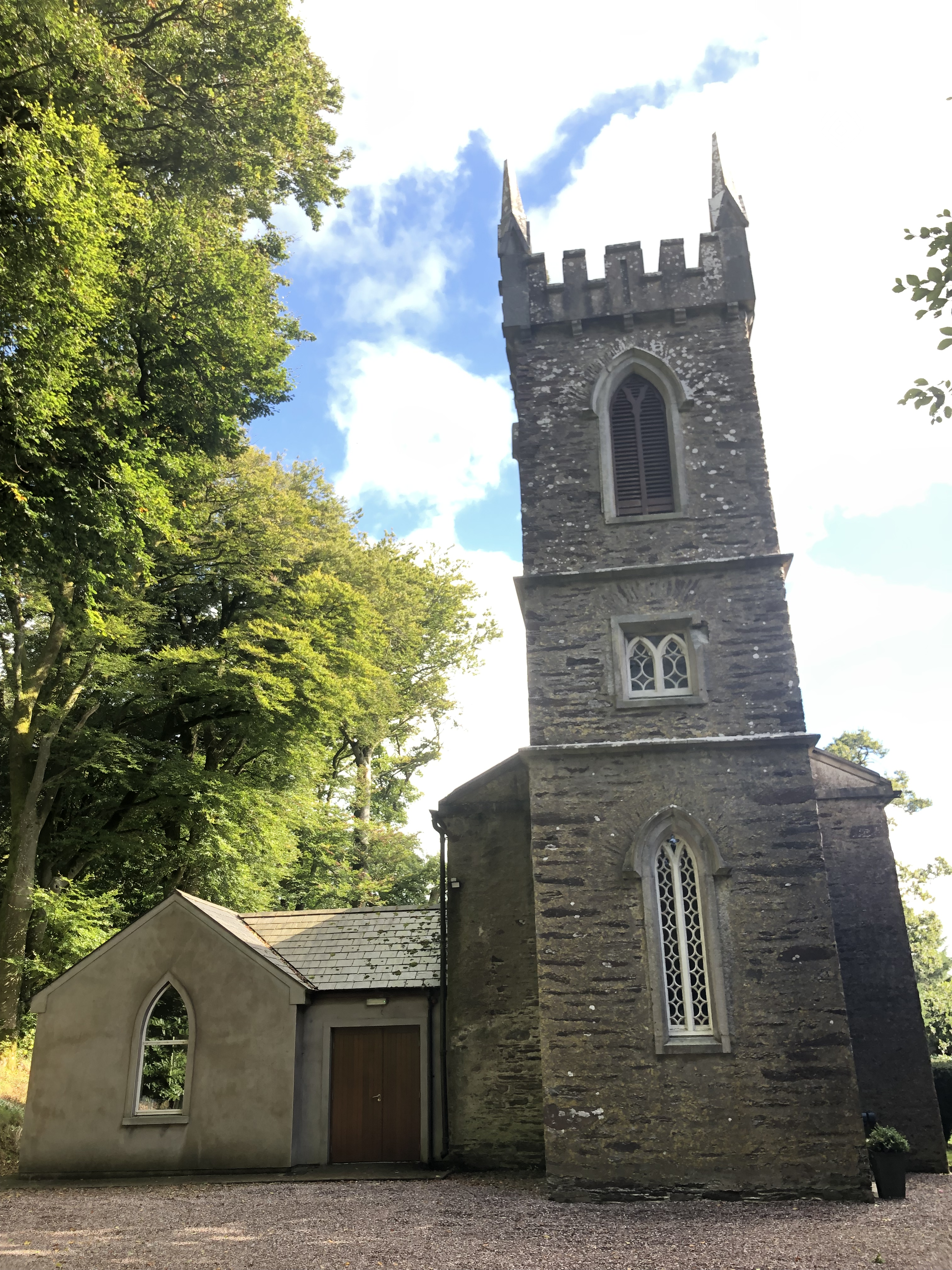
A view of the tower of the church and the 2012 extension.
