= Church of St Peter, Carrigrohane =

Church of St Peter
- Church of St Peter of the Resurrection
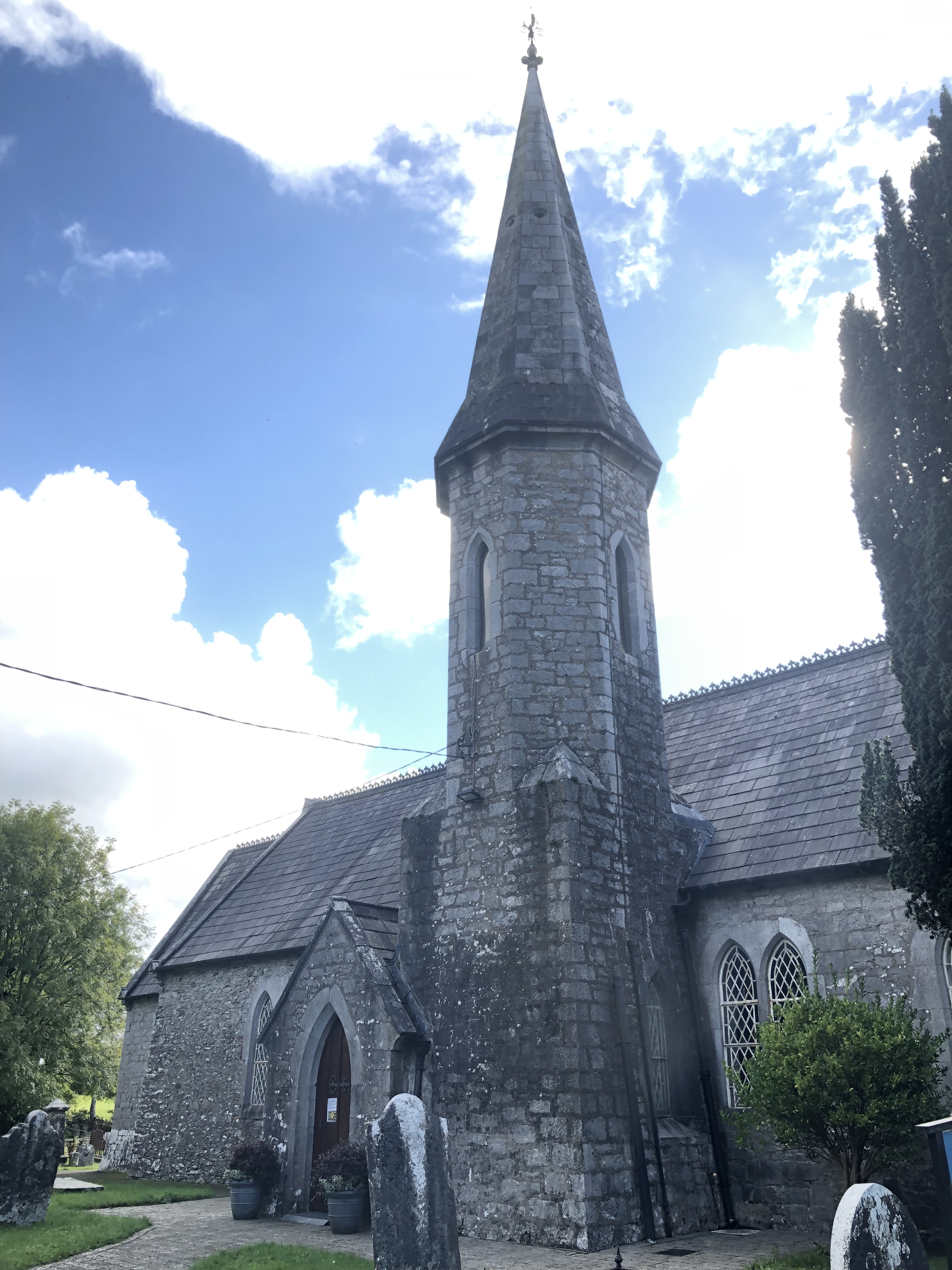
- St Peter's seen from the north west

- Location within Ireland
- 51.89516°N 8.55694°W
- Location: Carrigrohane, County Cork
- Country: Ireland
- Denomination: Church of Ireland
- Website: cupcork.ie

History
- Consecrated: 1854

Architecture
- Architect(s): Joseph Welland & William Burges
- Style: Gothic Revival
- Years built: 1854-68

Administration
- Diocese: Cork, Cloyne, and Ross

Clergy
- Rector: Rev Robert Ferris

The Church of St Peter, Carrigrohane, is a Gothic Revival church in County Cork, Ireland. It belongs to the Church of Ireland and was constructed in 1854, and extended by William Burges in 1865–68. The church is located on Church Hill, Carrigrohane, to the west of Cork city. It stands on the site of an earlier church, and is dedicated to Saint Peter. Along with the Church of the Resurrection and St Senan's Church it is part of the Carrigrohane Union of Parishes in the Diocese of Cork, Cloyne, and Ross.

== History ==
St Peter's is built on the remains of earlier churches, the site having been used for Christian worship since at least the 13th century. Joseph Welland designed the main body of the church, and it was constructed in 1854. The chancel to the east side and later side aisle extension to the south were added by William Burges in 1865–68. Reverend Robert Gregg, son of Bishop John Gregg, Burges's patron at Saint Fin Barre's Cathedral, Cork, was rector from 1865 to 1874. Burges's commission, and the church, were modest; he was only asked to design an additional south aisle and vestry; but Joseph Mordaunt Crook, Burges's biographer, wrote that the design revealed "an original architectural mind".

== Architecture ==
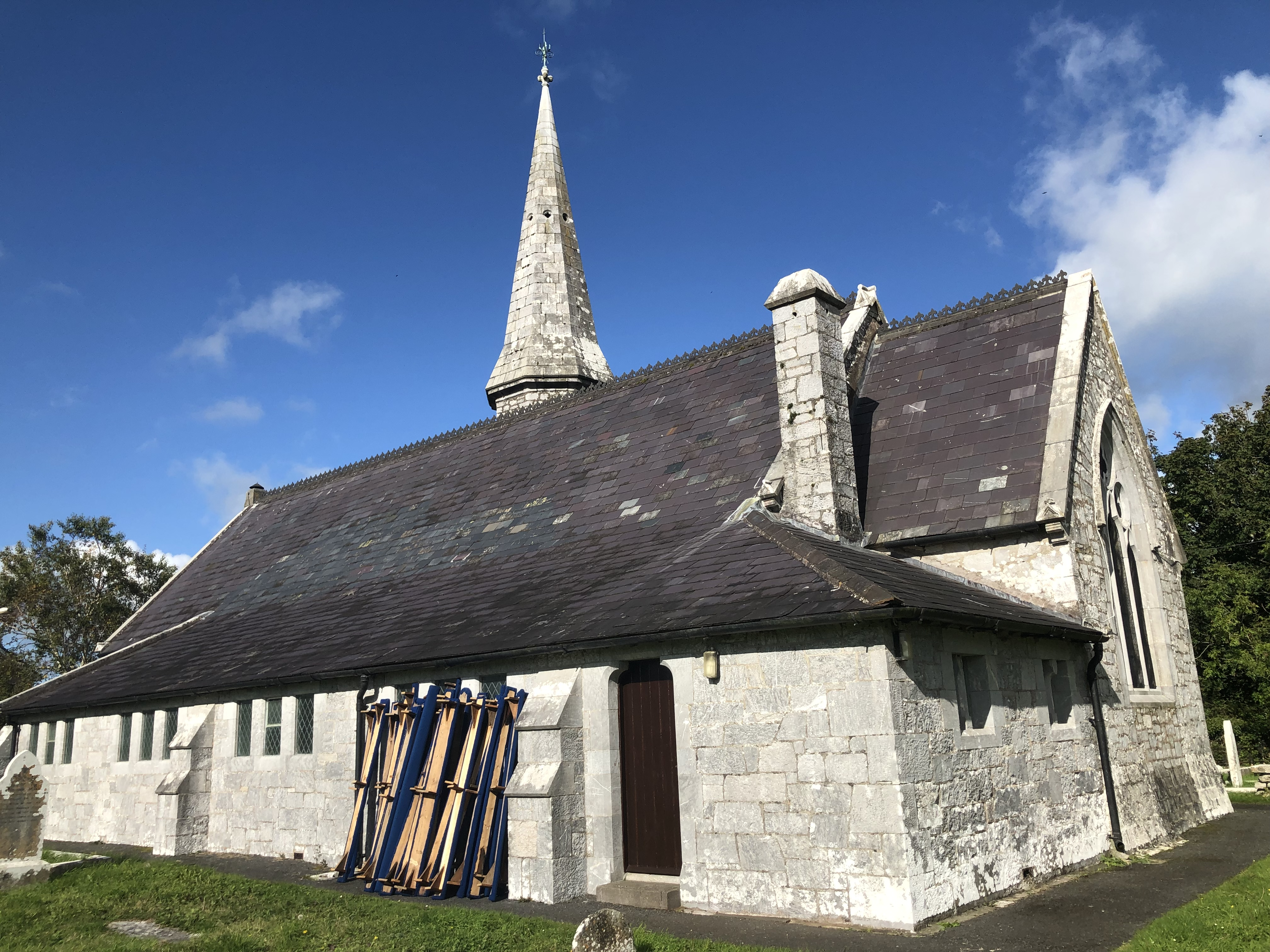
A rear-view of the church

The church, in a Gothic Revival style, has a three-bay nave with a two-stage tower and gable-fronted porch. The church retains "numerous original features", including stained glass by William Gualbert Saunders, Henry Holiday and Burges. The main panels of their pieces of stained glass feature Temperance, Fortitude, and Justice. The makers were Lavers and Barraud. Crook considered it "predictably good."
