= Church of the Resurrection, Blarney =

Anglican church in Cork, Ireland

Church of the Resurrection
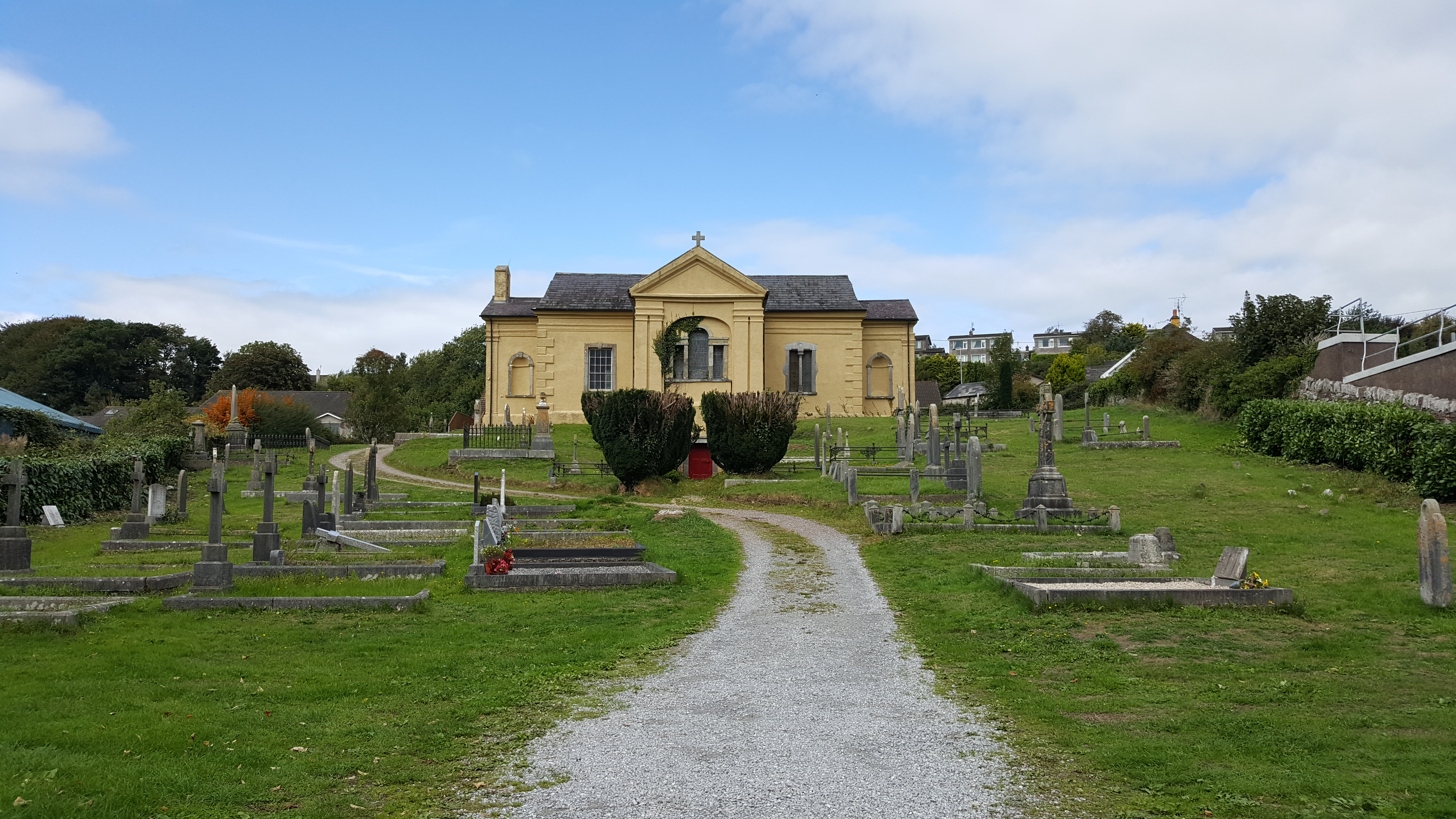
- Church of the Resurrection
- Country: Ireland
- Denomination: Church of Ireland
- Website: cupcork.ie

Architecture
- Architect: John Morrison (possibly)
- Style: Neoclassical
- Years built: 1771-1776

Clergy
- Rector: Robert Ferris

The Church of the Resurrection is a neoclassical Anglican church located in Blarney, County Cork, Ireland. It was completed circa. 1776, and is the oldest building still in use on Blarney's town square. It is dedicated to the resurrection of Jesus.

Along with the Church of Saint Peter and St Senan's Church, it is part of the Carrigrohane Union of Parishes, which is part of the Diocese of Cork, Cloyne, and Ross.

== History ==
Originally, the parish of Garrycloyne was served by a church on a different site. A new church was required due to the original's poor condition and distance from Blarney town. In 1766, an order was issued permitting the construction of a new church on the present site. Construction began in 1771, to plans possibly made by architect John Morrison, and built by Sir James St John Jefferyes. The Church of The Resurrection was completed in roughly 1776, partly funded by the Board of First Fruits. It has a glebe of 21 acres. A glebe-house was constructed in 1807. The church was expanded by an unknown architect in 1837, and an apse was constructed in 1861.

In either 1996, or 1997, the interior was renovated and modernised. The works "fundamentally altered" the building.

Robert Ferris became the rector of the parish in 2020, having been Associate Minister there for eight years prior to his promotion.

== Architecture ==
The church is cruciform, and built in the neoclassical style. This is unusual for a church built with funds from the Board of First Fruits, the majority of which were built the following century, and in the Gothic Revival style. It is built in Doric order. Above the gable of the south transept is a Latin cross made of limestone. The belfry contains a bell taken from an older church in Athnowen, Ovens.

The church features a piscina carved by Patrick Scannell.
