= Nohoval Church =

Anglican church in County Cork, Ireland

- Country: Ireland
- Denomination: Church of Ireland

Architecture
- Style: Gothic Revival
- Completed: 1744

Clergy
- Rector: The Revd James Power

Nohoval Church is a small Gothic Revival Anglican church located in Nohoval, County Cork, Ireland. It was completed in 1744. Along with Holy Trinity Church, Templebreedy, it is one of two churches constituting Templebreedy Union of Parishes in the Diocese of Cork, Cloyne, and Ross.

== History ==
Nohoval Church was completed in 1744. It was funded by the Board of First Fruits, first with a IR£450 gift, followed by a £50 loan in 1817. The church was redesigned in 1839 by an unknown architect, and again in 1895 by William Henry Hill.

== Architecture ==
The church is built in the Gothic Revival style, which is a typical trait of churches funded by the Board of First Fruits. The church features a saddleback roof and a square tower.
