= Christ Church, Kilbrogan =

Deconsecrated church in Cork, Ireland

Christ Church
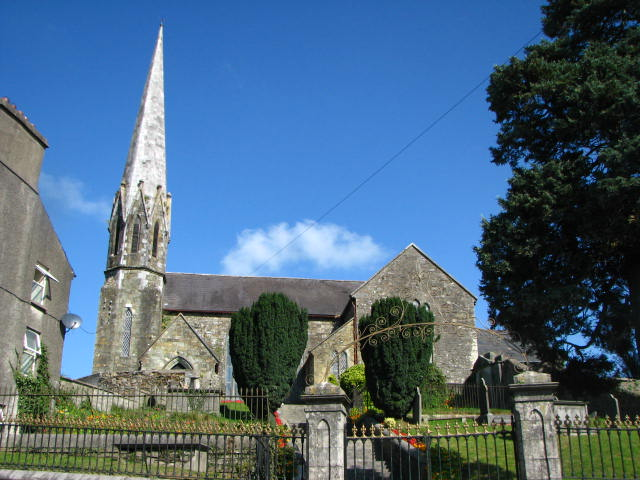

- Location within Ireland
- Christ Church
- 51°45′N 8°44′W
- Country: Ireland
- Denomination: Church of Ireland

Architecture
- Completed: c. 1610

Christ Church is a deconsecrated Anglican church located in Kilbrogan, Bandon, County Cork, Ireland. The oldest surviving post-Reformation Protestant church in Ireland, it was completed circa 1610. It is dedicated to Jesus Christ, and was part of the Diocese of Cork, Cloyne, and Ross. It is currently in use as the West Cork Heritage Centre.

== History ==
The oldest church in Bandon, Christ Church is also the earliest surviving post-Reformation purpose-built Protestant church in Ireland, having been built by English settlers when they founded the town of Bandon. A chancel and transepts were added by the 1st Earl of Cork in 1625.

Between 1855 and 1856, the church was expanded and remodelled in the Early English style by Joseph Welland. During this time a new window, organ, tower, and spire were also added.

The church was deconsecrated in 1973. Upon its closure, most of its fittings were removed and transferred to the larger Anglican church in Bandon, St Peter's Church.

== Architecture ==
The church was described as being among the finest Protestant churches in Ireland in 1933.
