= Church of St Multose =

Coordinates: 51°42′21″N 8°31′33″W

St. Multose's Church, Kinsale
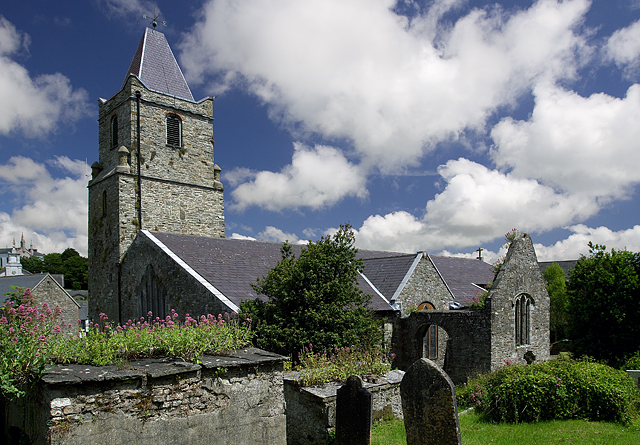
- St Multose Church, Kinsale
- St. Multose's Church, Kinsale
- Location: Kinsale, County Cork
- Country: Ireland
- Denomination: Church of Ireland

History
- Founded: 1190
- Dedication: Saint Multose

Architecture
- Functional status: active

Specifications
- Materials: Limestone

Administration
- Diocese: Cork, Cloyne and Ross
- Parish: Cork, St. Multose's Kinsale

The Church of St Multose is a Church of Ireland church located in Kinsale in Ireland. It is a cruciform church with a crypt. The current structure dates from the 1190s up to major additions in the 1750s with further renovations into the twentieth century.

== History ==
Built about 1190, the dominant bell tower is part of the original Norman structure. The church is located in what is believed to be the site of the 6th century ecclesiastical settlement of St. Multose. It is considered one of the Church of Ireland's oldest churches. The graveyard is roughly oval and surrounds the church. Within it are graves, mausoleums and monuments from the 16th to 19th centuries. Graves of victims of the RMS Lusitania sinking are also in the grounds. One notable event which took place in the church was the declaration of Charles II of England as king by Prince Rupert in 1649 during the English Civil War.
