= Holy Trinity Church, Schull =

Anglican church in Cork, Ireland

Holy Trinity Church
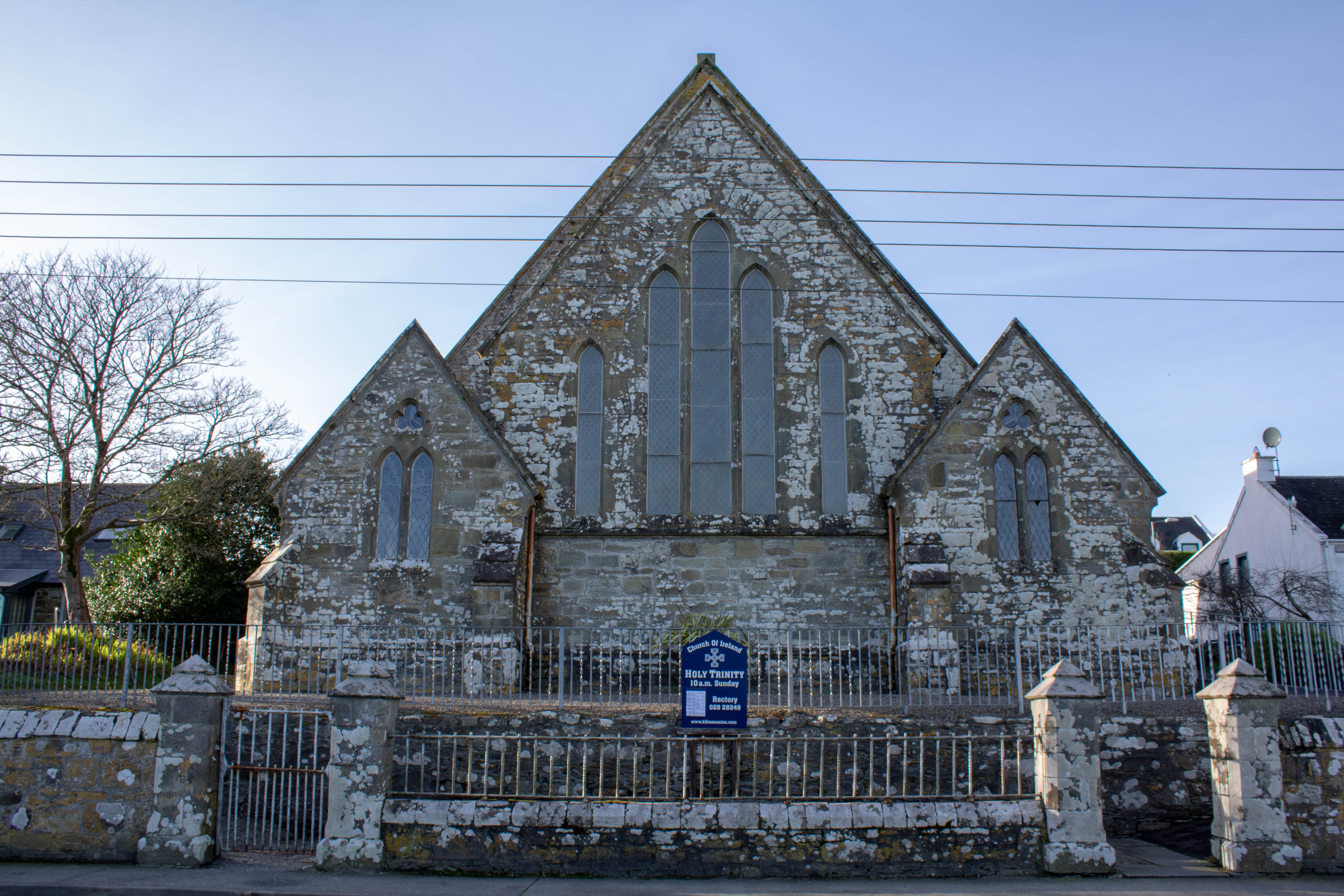
- Holy Trinity Church
- 51°31′29.69″N 9°32′52.11″W
- Country: Ireland
- Denomination: Church of Ireland

Architecture
- Completed: 1852 - 1854

Holy Trinity Church is a small Gothic Revival Anglican church located in Schull, County Cork, Ireland. It was completed in the 1850s. It is dedicated to the Holy Trinity. It is part of the Diocese of Cork, Cloyne, and Ross.

== History ==
Holy Trinity Church replaced an earlier church which was completed in 1720.

In 1830, plans for a new church were made by James Pain. Joseph Welland altered the plans in 1850, and Holy Trinity Church was completed between 1852 and 1854. The original church bell, which carries the inscription "For the Glory of God – Revd. John Triphook, Rector, 1859", was damaged in 1890, and underwent repairs. This bell was replaced in 1907 by a bell bearing the inscription “Sursum Corda – Cast and erected 1907.”

In 1889, Saint Fin Barre's Cathedral was rebuilt, and the original cathedral's organ was transferred to Holy Trinity Church. It was transported to Schull via the Cork, Bandon and South Coast Railway. In 1995, the organ was refurbished.

== Architecture ==
The church is gable-fronted, and features a seven-bay nave. The altar and reading desk are made of carved oak. The font is octagonal, and made of limestone.
