= All Saints' Church, Kilmalooda =

Anglican church in County Cork, Ireland

Coordinates: 51°40′12″N 8°49′10″W

All Saints' Church
- Country: Ireland
- Denomination: Church of Ireland

Architecture
- Architect(s): James Piers St Aubyn

Clergy
- Rector: Kingsley Sutton

All Saints' Church is a small Gothic Revival Anglican church located in Kilmalooda near Timoleague, County Cork, Ireland. It was completed in 1858. It is part of Kilgarrife Union of Parishes in the Diocese of Cork, Cloyne, and Ross. Kingsley Sutton is the current rector.

== History ==
The church was commissioned by William Bence-Jones as a memorial to his daughters Alice and Laura, both of whom died in December 1851. Construction began in 1857 to designs by James Piers St Aubyn, and the church was completed the following year.

== Architecture ==
The church is built in the Middle Pointed English Gothic architectural style. A bell tower was added to the church c. 1870. The nave of the church features a stained glass lancet window designed by John Milner Allen, depicting the Ascension of Christ.
