= Nohoval =

Village in County Cork, Ireland

Nohoval Nuachabháil
- Village
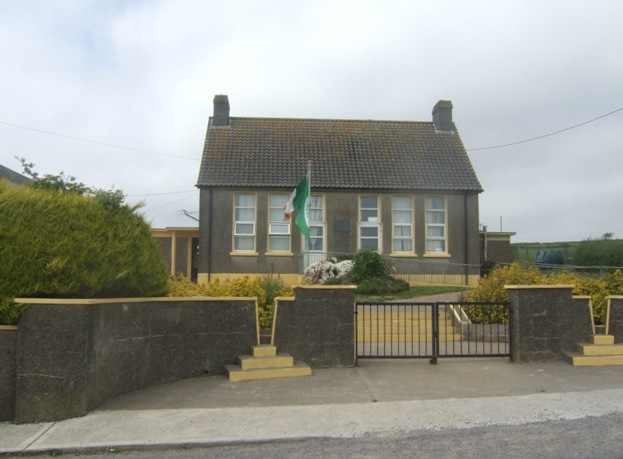
- Nohoval School

- Location in Ireland
- Coordinates: 51°43′20.35″N 08°24′04.04″W
- Country: Ireland
- Province: Munster
- County: County Cork
- Time zone: UTC+0 (WET)
  - Summer (DST): UTC-1 (IST (WEST))

Nohoval (Irish: Nuachabháil) is a village located in County Cork, Ireland. St. Patrick's and Nohoval Parish Churches are located in the village. It is approximately 26 km (16 mi) south of the city of Cork, approximately 16 km (10 mi) south of Carrigaline and 10 km (6 mi) east of Kinsale. The village is in a townland and civil parish of the same name.

== Local features ==
Nohoval's name originally came from the shortening of the Irish language name of "Nuachong-Bhail" or "Nuhongval", which meant "new habitation" when translated. Ordnance Survey Ireland and other mapping publishers seem to consistently list the village on their maps as Nohaval. The village is home to Nohoval Cove, a small cove on the south of Ireland coastline near the Wild Atlantic Way. The area surrounding it is full of abandoned old lime kilns.

In 1840, a three-storey mill was erected as part of a suspected Irish Famine relief project. It was built overlooking Man of War Cove (also called Smuggler's Cove), where numerous shipwrecks occurred. It had fallen into ruin until 1994 when it was restored and converted into a private dwelling.

The village had a local shop, which closed in 2018, and a local pub. The pub was closed, however, it later went to auction in 2019, with the sale including the pub's licence to sell alcohol for €225,000.

== Churches ==
Nohoval's Church of Ireland parish church is Nohoval Church, also known as St Peter's Church, and is under the ecclesiastic jurisdiction of the Diocese of Cork, Cloyne and Ross. The church's vestry, called Glebe House, was constructed in 1816 and was home to the vicar of the church until 1978 when a widow of one of the clergymen purchased it from the Church of Ireland with the aim of making it into a hotel which never materialised. The Roman Catholic Church in the village is represented by St Patrick's Church in the Diocese of Cork and Ross. The Catholic church also support the local primary school, Scoil Nuachabháil, with the Bishop of Kerry opening a new extension in 2019.

== 1919 incident ==
In December 1919, a teacher from the area, Michael Blanchfield, who had recently purchased a derelict house approximately 300 yards outside of Nohoval Village, was killed in an apparent robbery attempt. He was appointed national school teacher in Nohoval in 1899. It is stated in police reports that at around 11.00 pm on Wednesday night some people in the village heard two shots being fired in quick succession. Anyone who had heard the shots did not investigate their origins due to fear of the times. Mr Blanchfield's body was found the following morning. Mr Blanchfield was known for carrying a large sum of money around with him. This was missing from the murder scene which lead to the theory of a robbery. In a statement given to the Cork Examiner reporter by Mr M’Carthy, Blanchfield's landlord, Mr Blanchfield would carry ten to twelve £10 pound notes on his person at all times. This was a very large amount of money to be carrying around since the average weekly wage of a corporation worker was 22 to 30 shillings a week and in Henry Ford’s factory, which was considered high pay, you could earn up to 50 shillings a week. Note that at this time 20 shillings only made £1 pound sterling and Mr Blanchfield was carrying around £100 to £120 pounds. Mr M’Carthy stated that he warned Mr Blanchfield not to carry so much money around on his person due to the fact that Mr Blanchfield had been robbed a few years previously.

An examination of the wounds inflicted on Mr Blanchfield showed two shot-gun charges hit his body. The medical examiner stated that due to Mr Blanchfield's severe injuries he would have still died even if given medical treatment right after being shot. Mrb Blanchfield died from a punctured lung.

== See also ==
- List of towns and villages in Ireland
