= St Matthew's Church, Aghadown =

Anglican church in Cork, Ireland

St Matthew's Church
- Country: Ireland
- Denomination: Church of Ireland

Architecture
- Architect(s): Henry & Arthur Hill

Clergy
- Rector: Stephen McCann

St Matthew's Church is a small Gothic Revival Anglican church located in Aghadown, County Cork, Ireland. It was completed in 1873. It is dedicated to Matthew the Apostle. Along with St Matthias' Church in Ballydehob, it is part of the Ballydehob Union of Parishes in the Diocese of Cork, Cloyne, and Ross.

Stephen McCann currently serves as rector of the parish.

== History ==
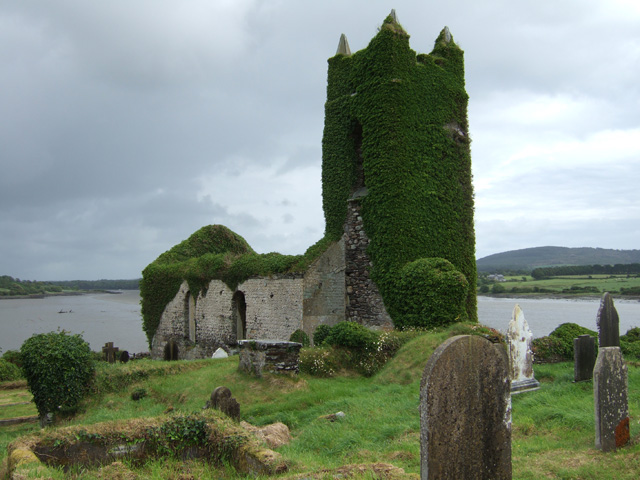
The original church of St Matthew, now ruined.

St Matthew's replaced an earlier church in Aghadown, which was located on the banks of the River Ilen. This original church was also dedicated to St Matthew, and was built in 1814. The current church stands on a site donated by John H. Becher, and was completed in 1873.

Between 1886 and 1957, the Schull and Skibereen Railway line bordered the boundary of the churchyard.

== Architecture ==
St Matthew's was designed by father and son Cork architects Henry and Arthur Hill. It is built in the early French Gothic style. The church's organ was built in London in the early 19th century, and was originally housed in the old church.
