= Brinny Church =

Anglican church in Cork, Ireland

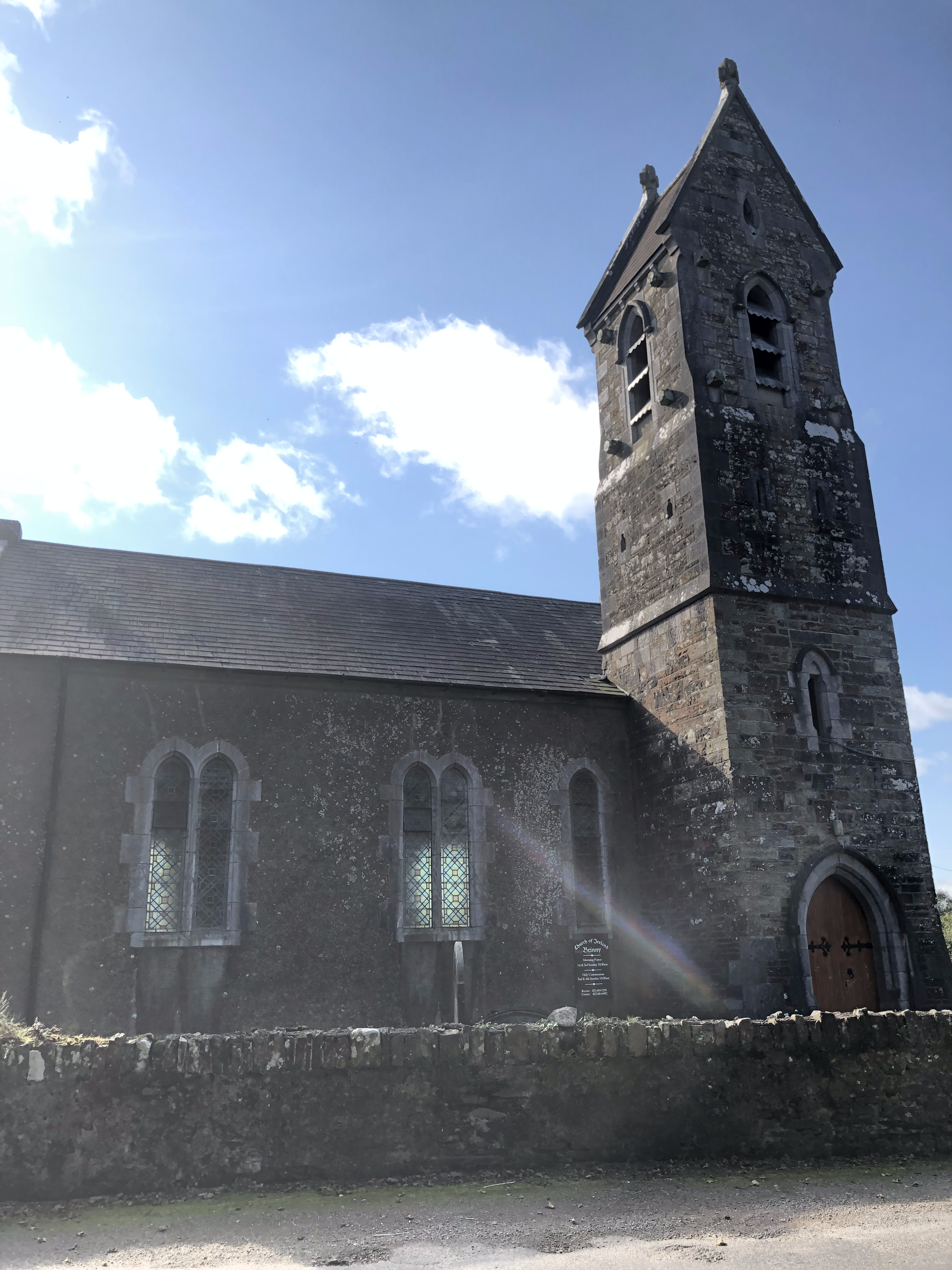

- Location within Ireland
- Brinny Church
- 51°47′02″N 8°41′55″W
- Country: Ireland
- Denomination: Church of Ireland

Brinny Church is an Anglican Gothic Revival church located in Brinny, County Cork, Ireland. It has no dedication. It is part of the Bandon Union of parishes in the Diocese of Cork, Cloyne, and Ross.

== History ==
A rudimentary structure was consisted on the site of the church in 1737. The church was substantially rebuilt in 1813, at a cost of IR£300, which was loaned by the Board of First Fruits. The building was further altered in the 1880s and 1890s. The tower was designed by Arthur Hill, though some sources falsely attribute it to his father, Henry Hill. Sources differ on when it was built: though most sources claim it was added during the alterations to the building in the 1880s and 1890s, Samuel Lewis mentions the tower in a book dating from 1837. If the tower was built during the 1813 renovations, Henry couldn't have designed it as he was born in 1806.

== Architecture ==
The church has three bays and a saddle roof.
