= Bandon Town Hall =

Municipal building in Bandon, County Cork, Ireland

- Halla an Bhaile Droichead na Bandan
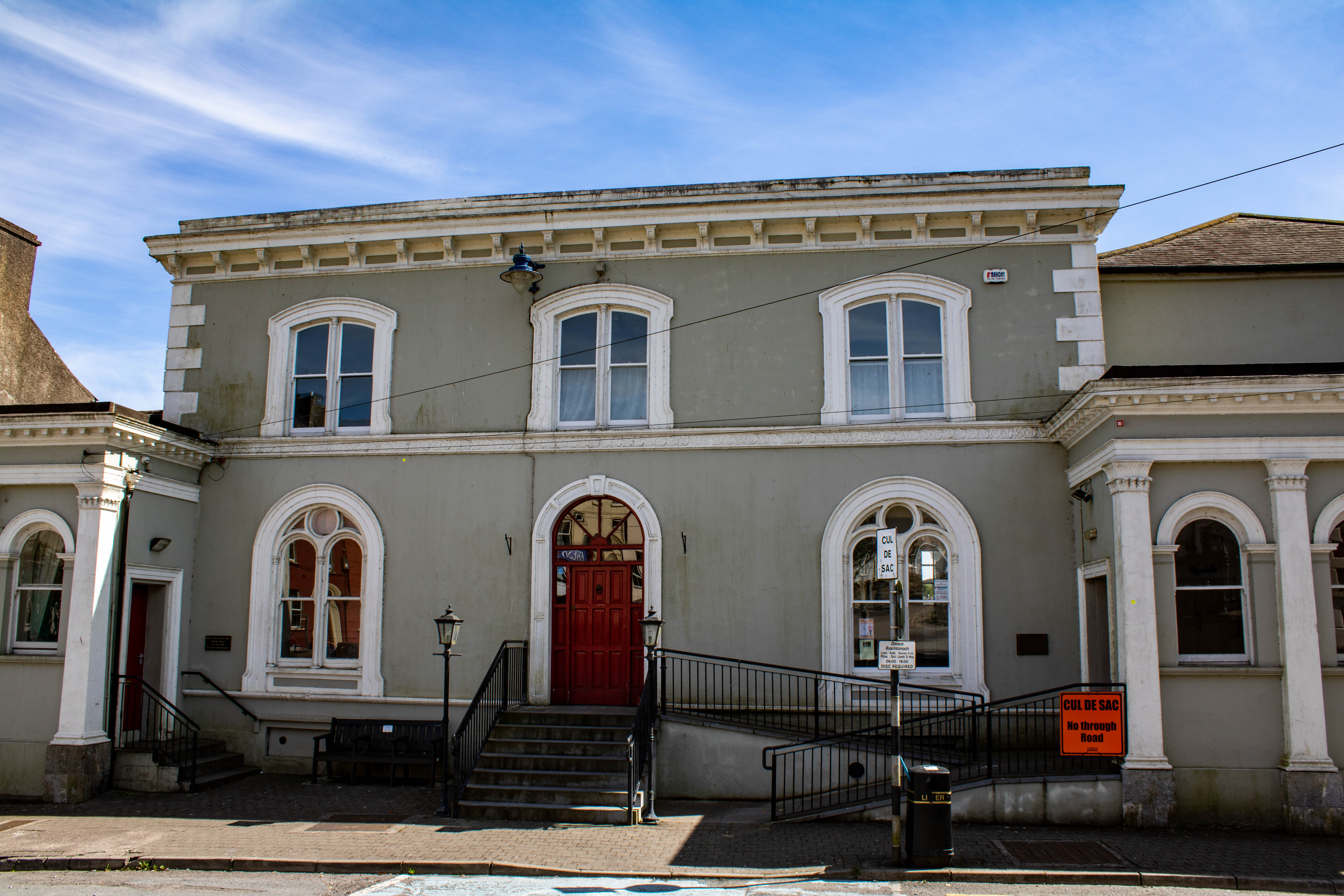
- Bandon Town Hall

- Location within County Cork

General information
- Architectural style: Italianate style
- Location: North Main Street, Bandon, Ireland
- Coordinates: 51.7468°N 8.7385°W
- Completed: 1863

Design and construction
- Architect: Richard Rolt Brash

Bandon Town Hall (Irish: Halla an Bhaile Droichead na Bandan) is a municipal building on North Main Street in Bandon, County Cork, Ireland. It is currently used as a community events venue.

== History ==
The building was financed by public subscription: one of the more significant subscribers was William Cavendish, 7th Duke of Devonshire, whose seat was at Lismore Castle, and who subscribed £100. The duke retained ownership of the site and rented the building out to trustees who were responsible for the management of the building. The new building was designed by Richard Rolt Brash in the Italianate style, built in brick with a cement render and was officially opened by the duke on 9 October 1863.

The design involved a symmetrical main frontage of nine bays facing onto North Main Street. The layout involved a central block, which was two-storeys high, flanked by a pair of single-storey wings, which were projected forward. The central block of three bays featured a short flight of steps leading up to a round headed doorway with a fanlight, an architrave and a keystone. The doorway was flanked by a pair of rounded headed windows with oculi and tracery, while the first floor was fenestrated by segmental headed mullioned windows with archivolts. There were quoins at the corners and, at roof level, there was a modillioned cornice. The wings of three bays each were fenestrated by round headed windows separated by pilasters supporting a frieze and a modillioned cornice. Internally, the principal room was an assembly hall, which served as the meeting place of the town commissioners.

Science and technology classes were initiated in the town hall shortly after it opened. The buildings was also used for public events: the politician and author, William Joseph O'Neill Daunt, gave a lecture on the life and career of the anti-poverty campaigner, Richard Grattan, in the town hall in August 1874.

Follow implementation of the Local Government Act 2001, under which the town commissioners were succeeded by Bandon Town Council, the assembly room became the council chamber of the new council. After extensive flooding in the area, the President of Ireland, Mary McAleese, visited the town hall and expressed her sympathy for local people affected by the flooding. The building continues to be used as a community events venue and hosts concerts by The Old Town Hall Band, the members of which performed with the dance bands of the 1950s.
