= St Peter's Church, Ballymodan =

Anglican church in Cork, Ireland

St Peter's Church
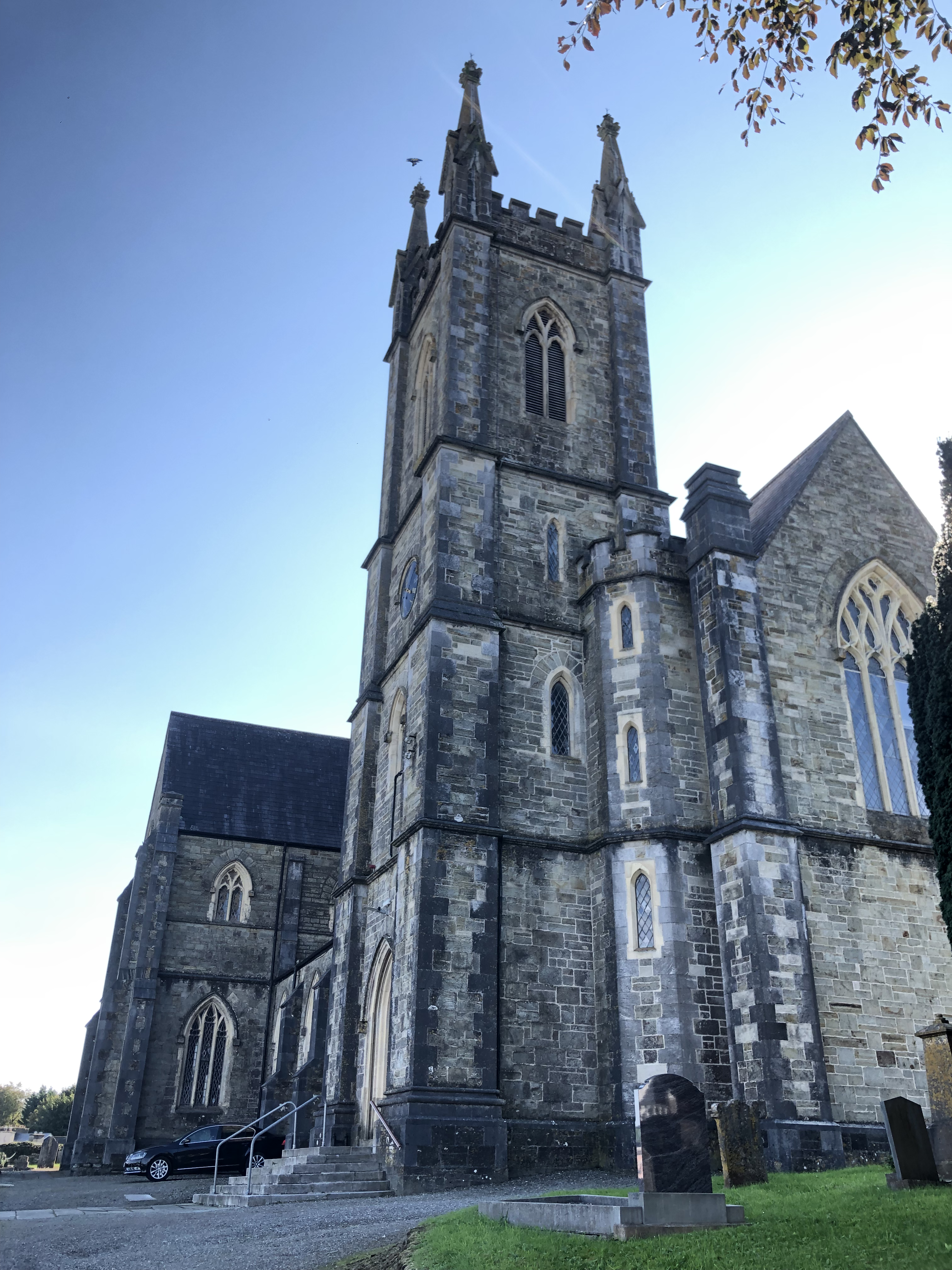
- A view of the church from the entrance on the north west of the grounds.
- St Peter's Church
- Country: Ireland
- Denomination: Church of Ireland
- Website: http://cork.anglican.org/places/bandon-union/

Architecture
- Architect: Joseph Welland
- Style: Gothic Revival
- Years built: 1847-1849

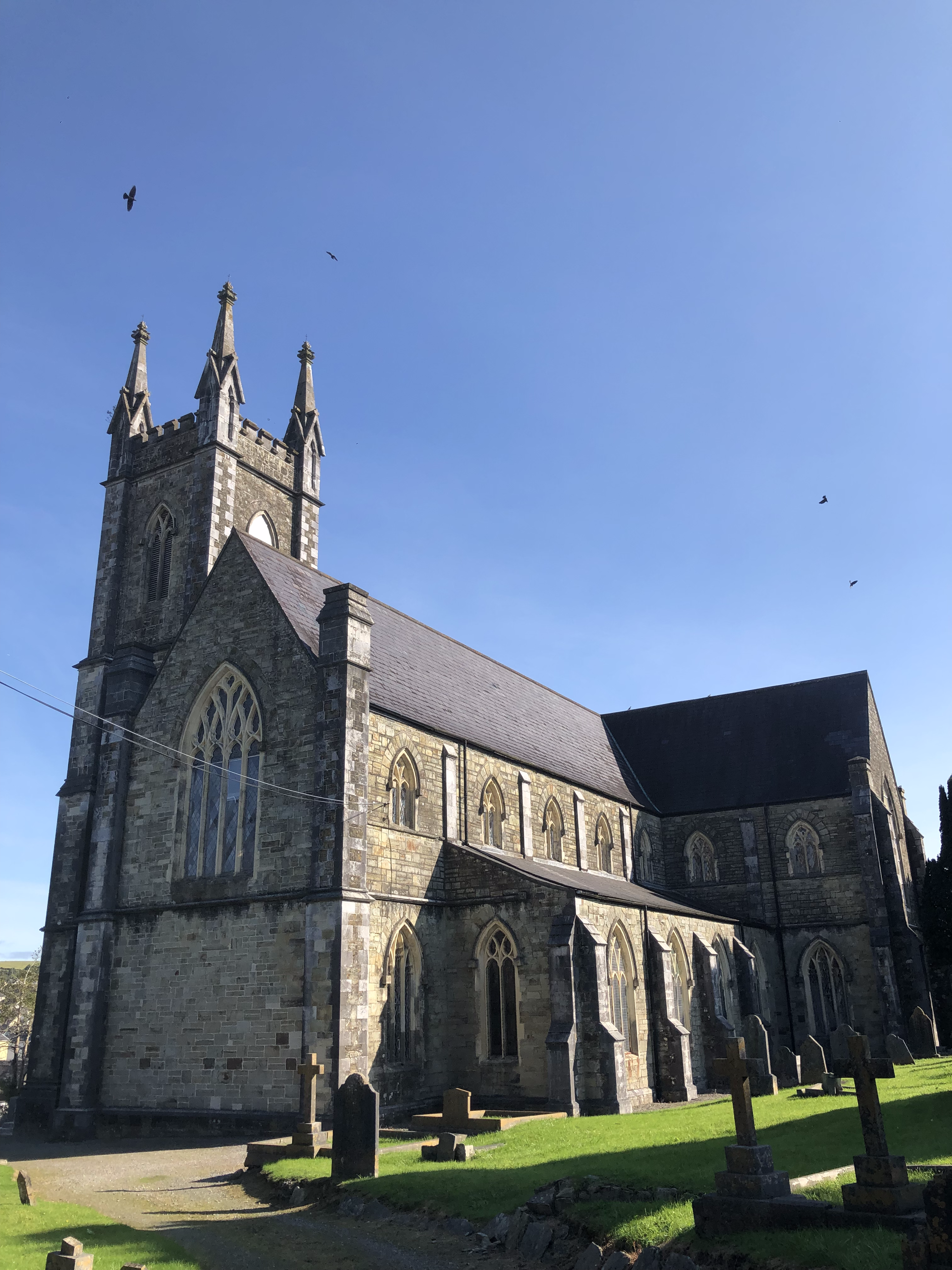
The church as seen from the south westerly entrance to the grounds.

St Peter's Church, Ballymodan (also referred to as St Peter's Church, Bandon) is an Anglican Gothic Revival church located in Ballymodan, Bandon, County Cork, Ireland. It was completed in 1849. It is part of the Diocese of Cork, Cloyne, and Ross. It is a middle-pointed, cruciform church.

== History ==
The church is situated on the site of an earlier church dating back to 1614, which was also dedicated to St Peter. The old church was demolished and the new church erected because the parishioners did not like the architecture of the original building.

Construction began in 1847, with the foundation stone being laid by the Earl of Bandon on 9 March that year. The church was consecrated on 30 August 1849. The chancel was remodelled in 1893 by James Fuller.

Many prominent families in Bandon acted as patrons of the church, the earls of Bandon of Castle Bernard in particular. There are numerous memorials and tablets in memory of members of the Bernard family located in the church as a result.

The church was closed between 1963 and 1964 for repairs. As part of these repairs, the church was reroofed and an exterior parapet was removed. A modern heating system was installed, along with a sound amplification system. The cost of the works amounted to IR£17,000.

St Peter's was rededicated on 17 November 1969.

In 1973, Christ Church, Bandon was deconsecrated and much of the furnishings were transferred to St Peter’s.

== Architecture ==
St Peter's church is constructed in the Gothic Revival style. It is a middle-pointed, cruciform church. The architect was Joseph Welland, and the church was built by Thomas Carroll between 1847 and 1849.

=== Interior ===
The floor of the church is mosaiced. The pulpit is built of Caen stone.

The tower of the church contains a ring of six bells, which were dedicated in 1885. The dedication of the bells was performed by the Bishop of Cork, Cloyne, and Ross, Robert Gregg. They were gifted by William Evans-Freke, the Lord Carbery, and his daughter the Countess of Bandon, in memory of Evans-Freke's wife, the Lady Carbery. The bells give the notes F,G,A,B,C, and D. The tenor bell weighs 15 cwt (~762 kg). The bells were made by Taylor & Co. in Leicestershire at a cost of £800.

=== Exterior ===
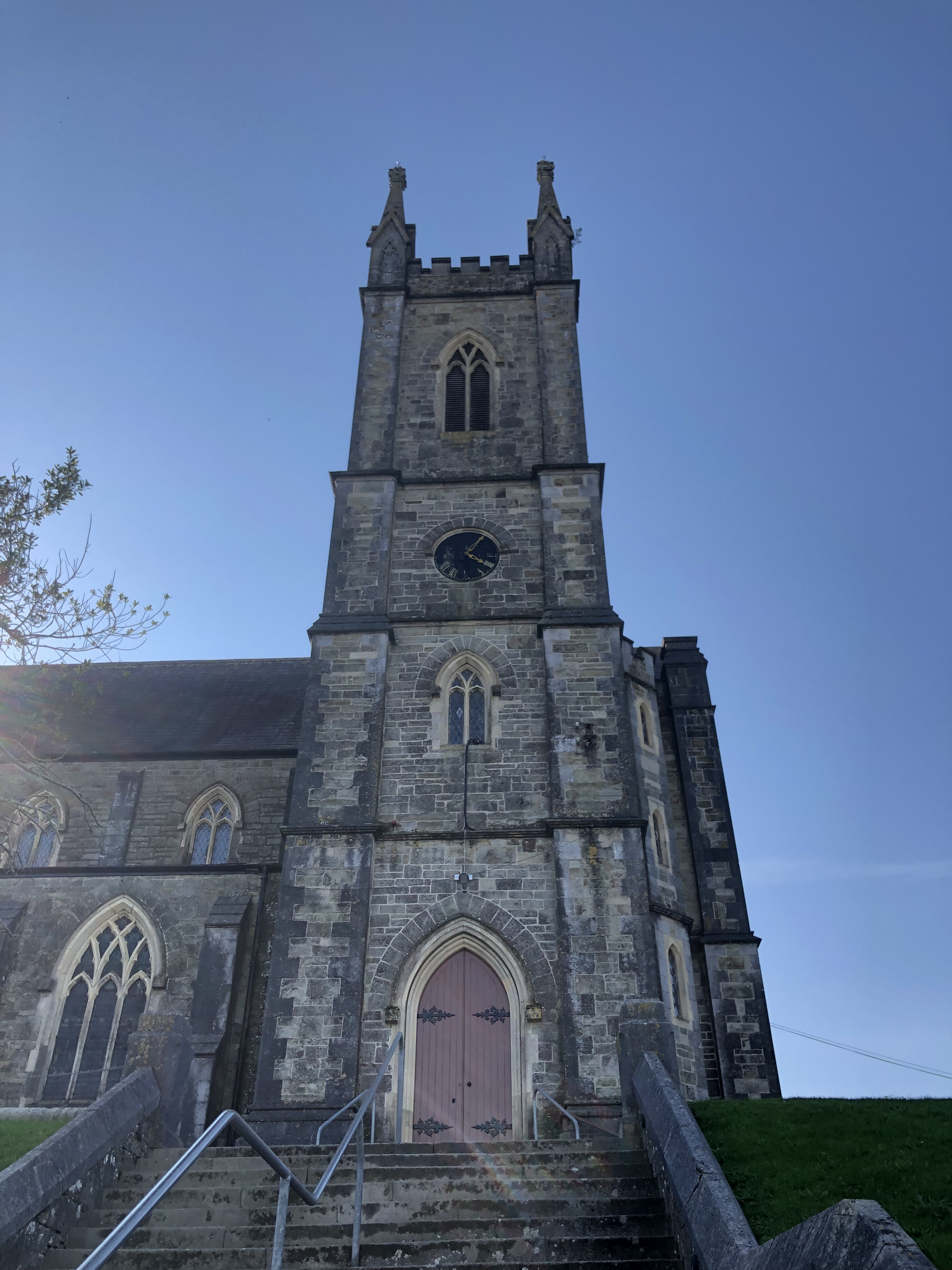
The church's tower, with its clock visible.

The clock on the tower of the church was previously used in the Council Chamber of the old Town commissioners. The clock and chimes had been silent for several years but were repaired in 1968 by the Bandon Chamber of Commerce at a cost of £300.
