= Bandon, County Cork =

Town in County Cork, Ireland

Bandon Droichead na Bandan
- Town
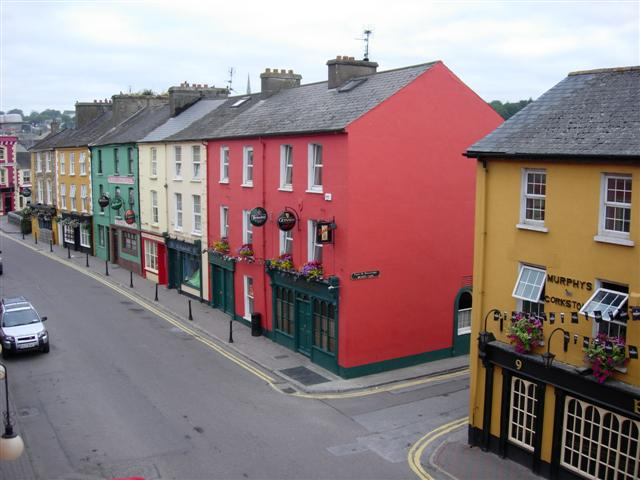
- Oliver Plunkett Street

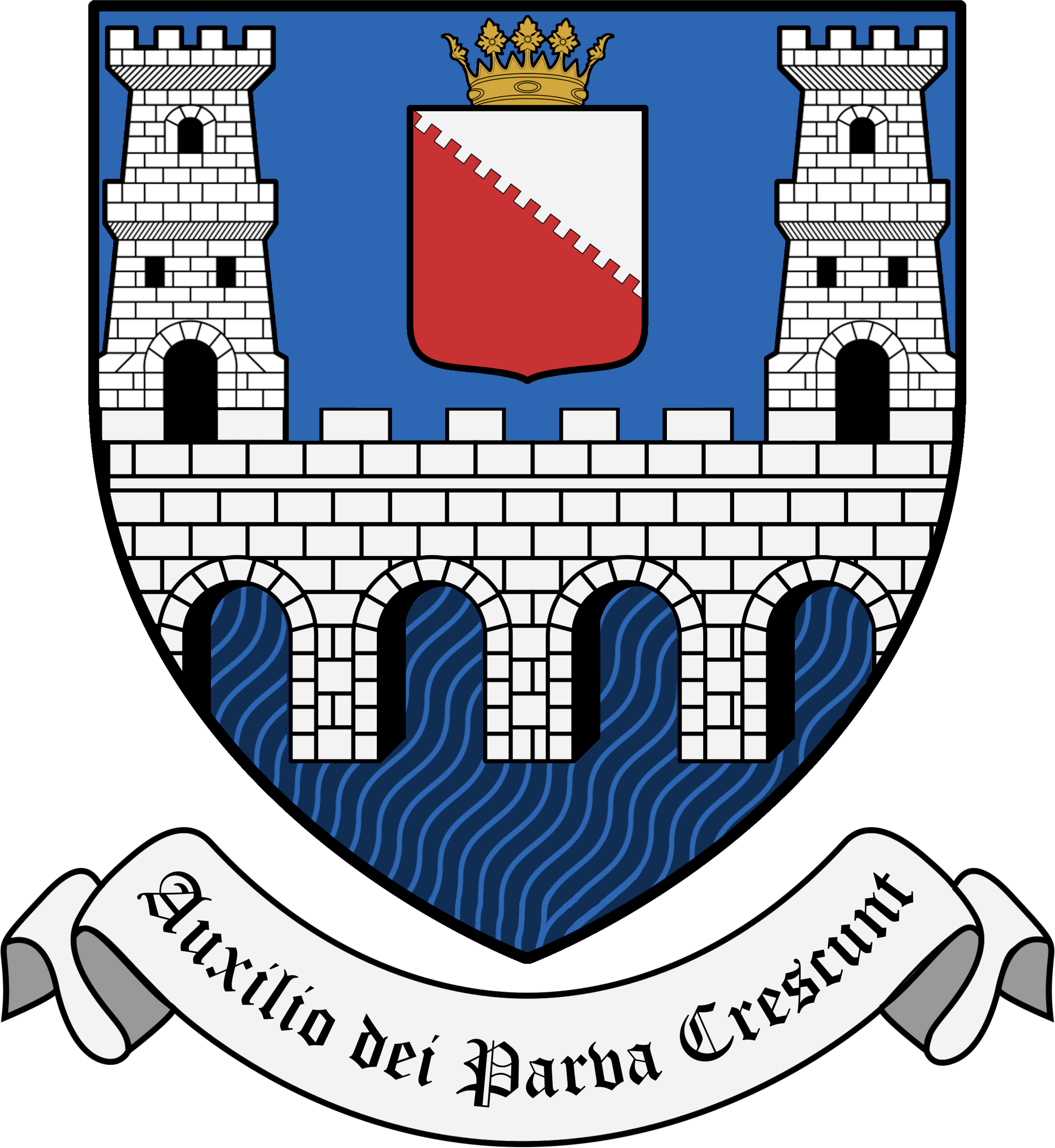
- Coat of arms
- Motto: Latin: Auxilio Dei Parva Crescunt "With the help of God small things grow"
- Location in Ireland
- Coordinates: 51.746°N 8.735°W
- Country: Ireland
- Province: Munster
- County: Cork

Area
  - Urban: 4.1 km^{2} (1.6 sq mi)
- Elevation: 30 m (98 ft)

Population (2022)
  - Town: 8,196
  - Density: 1,999/km^{2} (5,180/sq mi)
- Time zone: UTC±0 (WET)
  - Summer (DST): UTC+1 (IST)
- Eircode routing key: P72
- Telephone area code: +353(0)23
- Irish Grid Reference: W488551
- Website: bandon.ie

Bandon (/ˈbændən/; Irish: Droichead na Bandan) is a town in County Cork, Ireland. It lies on the River Bandon between two hills. The name in Irish means 'bridge of the Bandon', a reference to the origin of the town as a crossing point on the river. In 2004 Bandon celebrated its quatercentenary. The town, sometimes called the Gateway to West Cork, had a population of 8,196 at the 2022 census.

== History ==
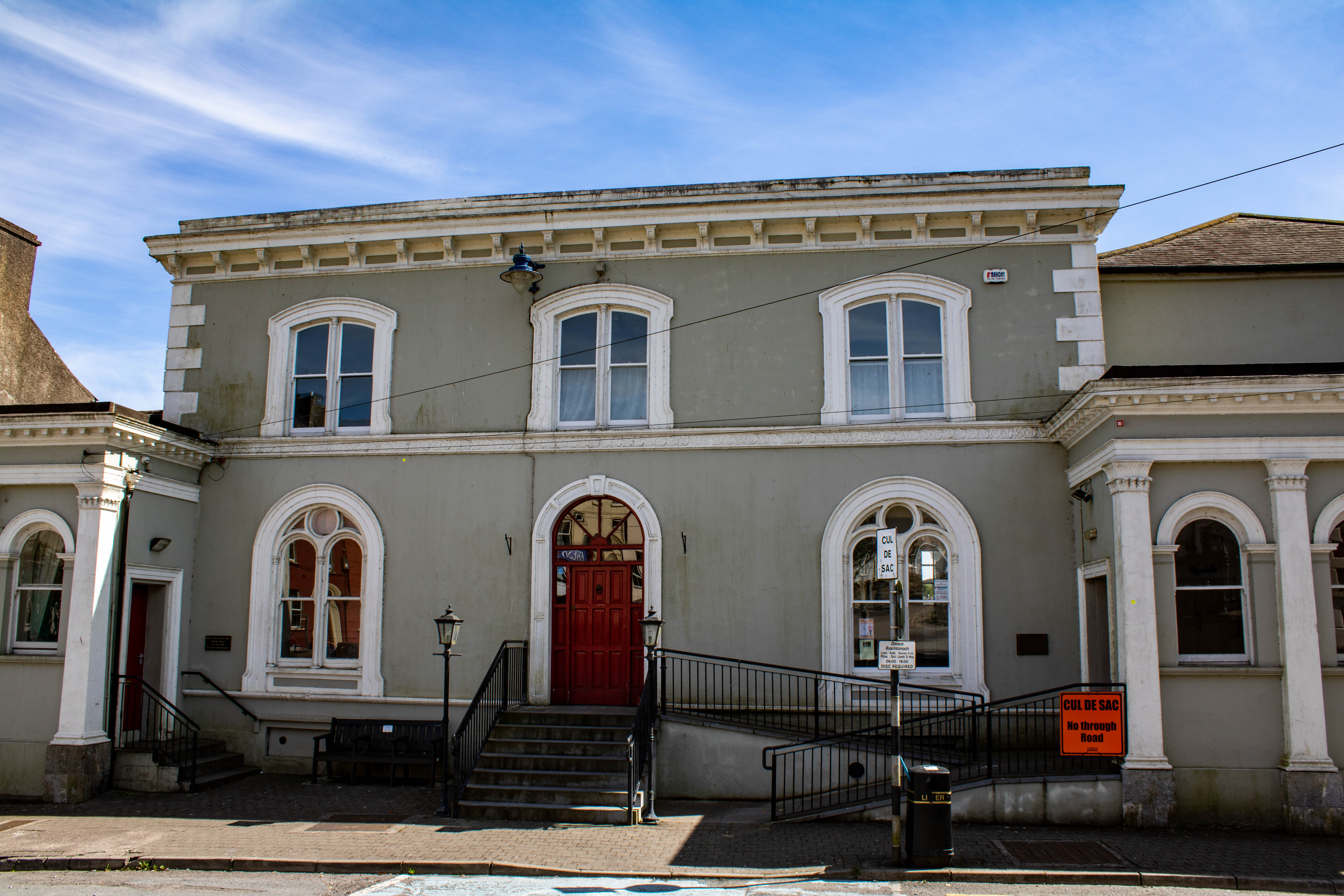
Bandon Town Hall

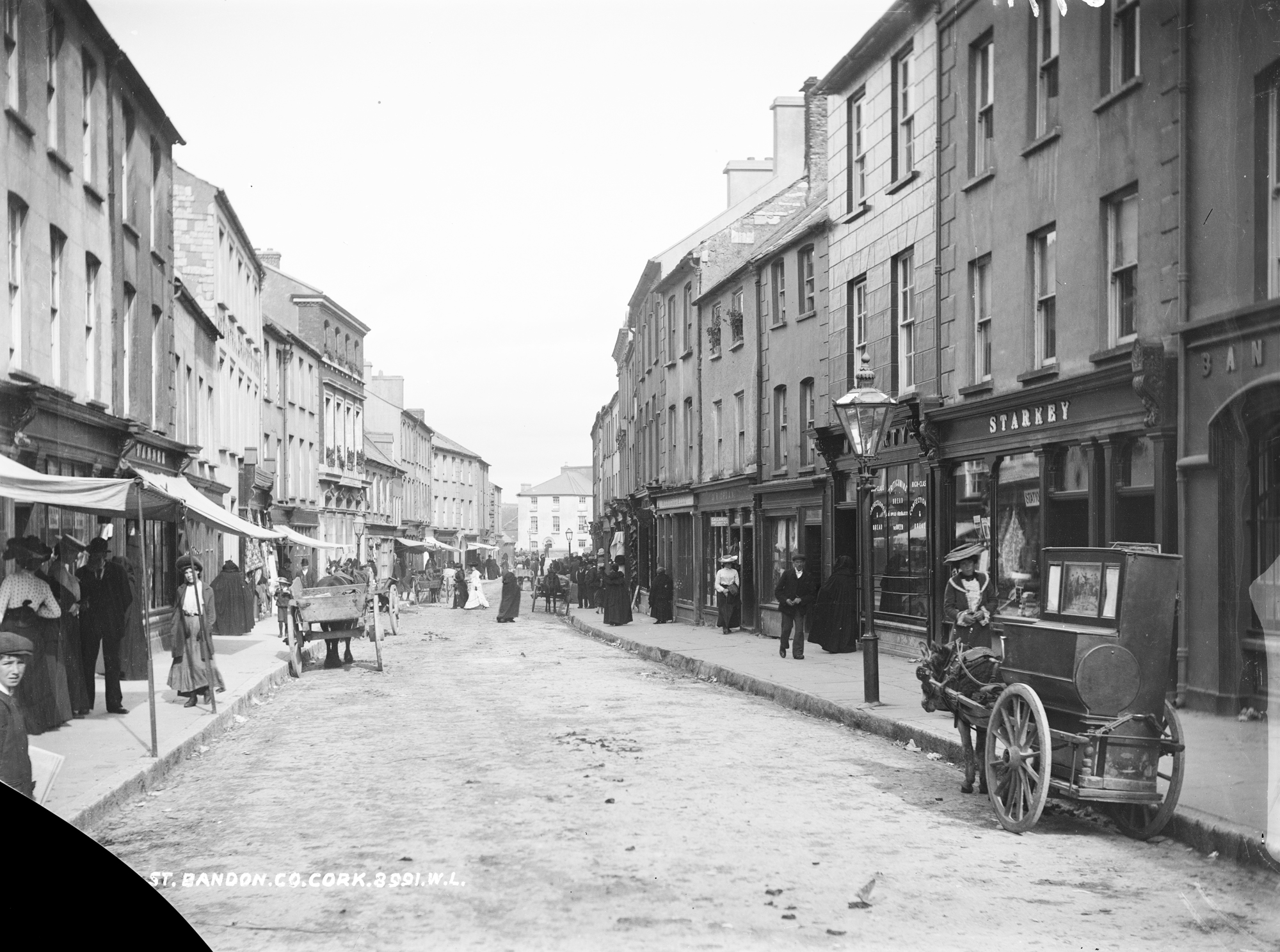
Main Street, Bandon, c.1900

Historical population
Year	Pop.	±%
1821	10,179	—
1831	9,917	−2.6%
1841	9,049	−8.8%
1851	6,909	−23.6%
1861	6,243	−9.6%
1871	6,131	−1.8%
1881	3,997	−34.8%
1891	3,488	−12.7%
1901	2,830	−18.9%
1911	3,122	+10.3%
1926	2,830	−9.4%
1936	2,839	+0.3%
1946	2,613	−8.0%
1951	2,527	−3.3%
1956	3,821	+51.2%
1961	3,735	−2.3%
1966	3,815	+2.1%
1971	4,071	+6.7%
1981	4,630	+13.7%
1986	4,926	+6.4%
1991	4,741	−3.8%
1996	5,612	+18.4%
2002	5,161	−8.0%
2006	5,822	+12.8%
2011	6,640	+14.1%
2016	6,957	+4.8%
2022	8,196	+17.8%

In September 1588, at the start of the Plantation of Munster, Phane Beecher of London acquired, as Undertaker, the seignory of Castlemahon. It was in this seignory that the town of Bandon was formed in 1604 by Phane Beecher's son and heir Henry Beecher, together with other English settlers John Shipward, William Newce and John Archdeacon. The original settlers in Beecher's seignory came from various locations in England. Originally the town proper was inhabited solely by Protestants, as a by-law had been passed stating "That no Roman Catholic be permitted to reside in the town". A protective wall extended for about a mile around the town. Written on the gates of Bandon at this time was a warning "Entrance to Jew, Turk or Atheist; any man except a Papist". A response was scrawled under the sign noting: "The man who wrote this wrote it well, for the same thing is writ on the gates of hell."

Buildings sprang up on both sides of the river and over time a series of bridges linked both settlements. Like other towns in Cork, it benefitted greatly from the patronage of Richard Boyle, 1st Earl of Cork, although he was not, as he liked to claim, its "founder". Christ Church, Kilbrogan, is the oldest church in Bandon, and also the oldest purpose-built post-Reformation Protestant church in Ireland. In 1689 it was the scene of a clash between Jacobite and Williamite forces during the War of the Two Kings. After an uprising by Protestant inhabitants who expelled the Irish Army garrison, a larger force under Justin McCarthy, Viscount Mountcashel arrived and retook the town.

Sir John Moore, who was later leader of the British Army and was killed at the Battle of Corunna in Spain in 1809, was governor of the town in 1798.

In the 19th century, the town grew as a leading industrial centre which included brewing, tanning, distilling, corn and cotton milling. The now closed Allman's Distillery produced at one point over 600,000 gallons of whiskey annually. The Industrial Revolution in the 1800s and the advent of the railways had a profound effect on the socioeconomic and cultural ecosystem of the area. Local weaving operations could not compete with mass-produced cheap imports. St Peter's Church was built in 1847, and Bandon Town Hall was completed in 1862.

Major General Arthur Ernest Percival was commander of the British garrison in Bandon in 1920–21 during the Irish War of Independence. He was subsequently the commanding officer of the British troops who surrendered Singapore to the Japanese forces in 1942. In 1945 he was invited by Douglas MacArthur to witness the surrender of Japanese forces in Tokyo in 1945 which ended the Second World War. Irish army leader Michael Collins was killed in an ambush at Béal na Bláth, about 9.6 km (6.0 mi) outside Bandon.

Between 1911 and 1926, the non-Catholic population of Bandon dropped from 688 (22% of the population) to 375 (13% of the population), a decline of 45.5%. Peter Hart argued, in The IRA and its Enemies (1998), that during the Irish War of Independence, Bandon's Protestant population, which was largely unionist, suffered from Irish Republican Army (IRA) reprisals. In particular, ten Protestant men were shot over 27–29 April 1922 (two months before the start of the Civil War), "because they were Protestant."

Niall Meehan argued, however (2008, 2014), that Hart was mistaken. The killings were not "motivated by either land agitation or by sectarian considerations." In Peter Hart, the Issue of Sources, Brian Murphy noted a British intelligence assessment, A Record of the Rebellion in Ireland in 1920–1921, that Hart cited selectively. Hart wrote, "the truth was that, as British intelligence officers recognised, "in the south the Protestants and those who supported the Government rarely gave much information because, except by chance, they had not got it to give". Murphy observed, "Hart does not give the next two sentences from the official Record which read":

an exception to this rule was in the Bandon area where there were many Protestant farmers who gave information. Although the Intelligence Officer of the area was exceptionally experienced and although the troops were most active it proved almost impossible to protect those brave men, many of whom were murdered while almost all the remainder suffered grave material loss.

Murphy, therefore, concluded in a 1998 review of Hart's research, "the IRA killings in the Bandon area were motivated by political and not sectarian considerations". He amended this in 2005 to "Possibly, military considerations, rather than political, would have been a more fitting way to describe the reason for the IRA response to those who informed." In 2013 Bandon Mayor Gillian Coughlan described a song about these historical events by Professor David Fitzpatrick of TCD as "insulting to the memory of people who fought and to people who died".

Castle Bernard, the seat of Lord Bandon, was also burned in the Irish War of Independence.

Bandon has been flooded many times over the years, including November 2009 when the river burst its banks, and December 2015 as a result of Storm Desmond and Storm Frank. The Bandon Flood Relief Scheme was eventually finished in December 2022.

Bandon is in the three-seat Dáil constituency of Cork South-West.

=== Historic borough ===
Bandon was incorporated as a municipal borough by a charter of 1614 granted by James I. The corporation of the borough was formally known as "The Provost, Free Burgesses, and Commonalty of the Borough of Bandon-Bridge" and consisted of a provost, 12 burgesses, and an unlimited number of freemen. It had an oligarchic constitution. The common council, a body not mentioned in the borough charter, was constituted by a by-law of the corporation made in 1621. It consisted of twelve members, who were elected from the freemen by the corporation at large, as vacancies arose. The burgesses were chosen from the common council, on vacancies occurring, by the provost and burgesses.

The provost was elected annually from and by the burgesses at midsummer, and took office at Michaelmas. The freedom was acquired by birth for the eldest son of a freeman, and nomination of the provost, who during the year of his office had the privilege of naming one. The freemen were elected by a majority of the body at large assembled in a court of D'Oyer Hundred; neither residence nor any other qualification was considered necessary.

The municipal corporation was abolished by the Municipal Corporations (Ireland) Act 1840.

Prior to 1801, the parliamentary borough of Bandonbridge elected two MPs to the Irish House of Commons until its abolition under the Acts of Union 1800. From 1801 to 1885, the constituency of Bandon elected one MP to the United Kingdom House of Commons.

== Twin city ==
Bandon has a twin city agreement with Bandon, Oregon, in the United States. That city was founded in 1873 by Lord George Bennet, a native of the Irish Bandon who named the American one after it, and who is known especially for having introduced gorse into the US ecology with some disastrous results.

== Transport ==
Bandon is 27 km southwest of Cork City, on the N71 national secondary road, and served by Bus Éireann bus services from Cork city. The nearest airport is Cork Airport, 27km.

The nearest railway station today is Cork Kent. There was once a Bandon railway station (closed 1961), and a few others at various times.

== Sport ==
Sports clubs in the area include Bandon Rugby Football Club (inaugural winners of the 1886 Munster Senior Rugby Cup), Bandon Association Football Club (whose men's senior team play in the Munster Senior League Senior Premier Division), and Bandon GAA (affiliated to the Carbery GAA division of Cork GAA).

Bandon AC is an athletics club based in the area. There are also a number of martial arts clubs in the town, including karate, taekwondo, Brazilian jiu-jitsu and other clubs.

Bandon Golf Club is an 18-hole golf course on the grounds of Castle Bernard.

== Education ==
There are four secondary schools in Bandon. One of these, Bandon Grammar School, is a fee-paying Church of Ireland-ethos boarding school. The other schools are Hamilton High School, St. Brogan's College, and Coláiste na Toirbhirte (formerly known as Presentation Sisters College). Bandon Grammar School and St. Brogan's College are both mixed schools, Hamilton High School is a boys only school, and Coláiste na Toirbhirte is a girls only school.

== Demographics ==
As of the 2022 census, Bandon had a usually resident population of 8,101. Of these, 67.4% identified as White Irish, 0.4% as White Irish Travellers and 20.8% as other white ethnicities. A further 1.2% identified as Black or Black Irish, 2.2% as Asian or Asian Irish and 3.0% as other ethnicities. 5.0% of the population did not state their ethnicity.

== People ==
People from or associated with Bandon include :

- George Bennett (c.1824–1900), historian whose History of Bandon was first published in 1862. He is credited with founding the town of Bandon, Oregon in 1873.
- Nicholas Brady (1659–1726), a poet known for the Tate and Brady collaboration on a new version of the Psalms, was born in Bandon.
- Joseph Brennan (1887–1963), Chairman of the Currency Commission and Governor of the Central Bank of Ireland
- Sir Richard Cox (1650–1733), Lord Chancellor of Ireland, was born in Bandon
- Brian Crowley (1964–2026), Fianna Fáil politician and MEP.
- Graham Dwyer (b.1972), grew up in Bandon. He was convicted in 2015 of the murder of Dublin social worker Elaine O'Hara.
- Henry Gosnold (c.1560–c.1658), Chief Justice of Munster and friend of Francis Bacon, spent much of his life in Bandon, of which he became a burgess in 1612.
- Conor Hourihane (b.1991), former footballer
- Lloyd Jones (1811–1886), Cooperative Society activist, four times President of the Co-operative Congress, was born in Bandon
- James Long (1814–1887), an Anglican priest and orientalist who published the first English translation of the Bengali play Nil Darpan
- Graham Norton (b.1963), BBC chat show host, lived in Bandon and attended Bandon Grammar School. His mother still resides there.
- Eugene O'Keefe (1827–1913), a brewer and businessman, emigrated to Toronto and established the O'Keefe Brewery
- Cornelius O'Sullivan (1841–1907), a brewer's chemist, was born in Bandon in 1842 and in 1866 appointed assistant brewer and chemist to Bass & Co.
- George Strickland Kingston (1807–1880), who emigrated to Australia and became a civil engineer, architect and politician, was born in Bandon.
- Robert Baldwin Sullivan (1802–1853), second mayor of Toronto.
- Margaret Wolfe Hungerford (1855–1897), an author who wrote several Victorian era novels, lived in Bandon until her death.
- Attiwell Wood (c. 1728–1784), a barrister and member of the Irish House of Commons, came from an old Bandon family.

== See also ==
- Kilbrogan House
- List of towns and villages in Ireland
