= Carrigrohane =

Village near Cork city, Ireland

Carrigrohane Carraig Ruacháin
- Village
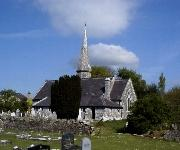
- Church of St Peter, Carrigrohane

- Location in Ireland
- Coordinates: 51°53′40″N 8°33′48″W
- Country: Ireland
- Province: Munster
- County: County Cork
- Time zone: UTC+0 (WET)
  - Summer (DST): UTC-1 (IST (WEST))

Carrigrohane (also Currikippane or Kilgrohanmore, meaning "marsh of the little sticks") is a village and civil parish situated on the south bank of the River Lee to the west of the city of Cork in Ireland. It is connected by the Carrigrohane Straight, 4 miles (6.4 km) west of Cork and is also in the northeastern part of Ballincollig. It contains St Peter's Church of the Resurrection. In 1837, it had a population of 1921 inhabitants. The civil parish is almost evenly split between the baronies of Muskerry East to the west and the Barony of Cork to the east.

== History ==
According to the Topographical Dictionary of Ireland, published by Samuel Lewis in 1837, Carrigrohane village was connected via a stone bridge to the parish of Inniscarra and onwards to Macroom.

Lewis describes the village as comprising 2,578 acres (1,043 ha), being "applotted under the tithe act, and valued at £4655 per annum; and that part of it which is included within the barony of Barretts contains 1,556 acres (630 ha), valued at £2136, according to the county estimate." Lewis describe the surrounding lands as being "of excellent quality, and the farms, being in the occupation of persons with capital, are in a fine state of cultivation."

Lewis also noted that the parish "forms part of the limestone district that extends from near the source of the River Bride, along its southern bank, across the vale to the west of the city of Cork, and passing through its southern suburbs, terminates at Blackrock. The quarrying of limestone and manufacture of gunpowder at Ballincollig encourage that industry among the people of which the fruits are seen in their comfortable appearance and the improved state of their habitations. On the river Lee are some extensive mills, capable of manufacturing from 350 to 400 sacks of flour weekly".

As of 1837, there were male and female parochial schools in the area supported by subscriptions; a national school at Ballincollig, in which were about 100 boys and 70 girls in the 1830s; a public and two private schools, one of which is for infants, in which are about 60 boys and 40 girls; and a Sunday school supported by the rector.

The church, St Peter's Church, is a "small plain edifice", situated near the River Lee. It was extended in 1865-68 for the Reverend Robert Gregg by the architect William Burges. Gregg was rector from 1865–74 and son of Bishop John Gregg, Burges's patron at Saint Fin Barre's Cathedral, Cork. The commission, and the church, were modest; Burges was only asked to design an additional south aisle and vestry; but Crook writes that the design reveals "an original architectural mind. And the stained glass is predictably good".

Close to the Church of St Peter is Carrigrohane Castle, and what Lewis (1837) describes as the "ruins of a more modern house of great strength". Both the older castle and the Elzabethan addition were ruined in the Irish Rebellion of 1641. After restoration in the latter 19th century, the castle was further renovated and used as a family home from the late 20th century.

Carrigrohane was also where the 1938 Cork Grand Prix took place.

== See also ==
- Carrigrohane parish (Church of Ireland)

== Sources ==
- This article contains public domain text from Samuel Lewis's A Topographical Dictionary of Ireland (1837)
- Crook, J. Mordaunt (1981). William Burges and the High Victorian Dream. John Murray. ISBN 978-0-7195-3822-3.
