= Carrigrohane parish (Church of Ireland) =

Church of Ireland parish in County Cork, Ireland

The Carrigrohane Union of Parishes is a Church of Ireland parish in County Cork, Ireland. In 2017 the parish used profits from a land sale to acquire a former military building for conversion into a church and parish center. The parish also holds an archive of military records from the Irish revolutionary period, which have been published in an online database. The three constituent churches of the parish are St Peter's Church, Carrigrohane, the Church of the Resurrection, Blarney, and St Senan's Church, Inniscarra. The parish community centre, the Carraig Centre, was visited by the Tánaiste Simon Harris in June 2025.
