= Diocese of Cork, Cloyne and Ross =

Anglican diocese of the Church of Ireland

United Diocese of Cork, Cloyne, and Ross Dioecesis Unita Corcagiensis, Cloynensis et Rossensis Deoise Aontaithe Chorcaí, Chluana agus Rosa
- Coat of arms

Location
- Ecclesiastical province: Dublin and Cashel

Information
- Denomination: Anglican
- Cathedral: Saint Finbarre's Cathedral, Cathedral Church of St. Fachtna, Cloyne Cathedral

Current leadership
- Bishop: Paul Colton, Bishop of Cork, Cloyne and Ross

Website
- cork.anglican.org

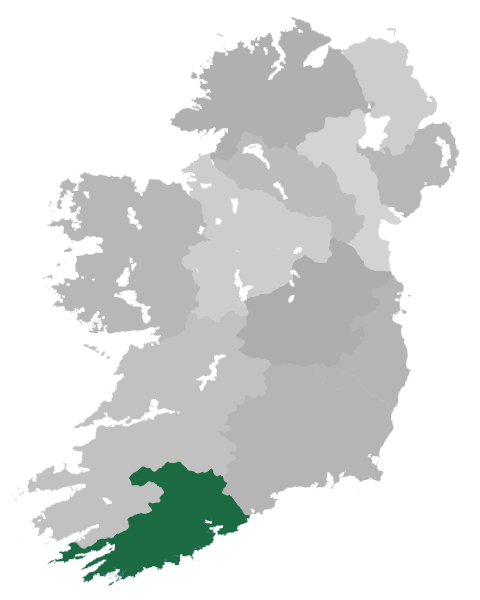

The Diocese of Cork, Cloyne and Ross, also referred to as the United Diocese of Cork, Cloyne and Ross, is a diocese in the Church of Ireland. The diocese is in the ecclesiastical province of Dublin. It is the see of the Bishop of Cork, Cloyne and Ross, the result of a combination of the bishoprics of Cork and Cloyne and Ross in 1583, the separation of Cork and Ross and Cloyne in 1660, and the re-combination of Cork and Ross and Cloyne in 1835.

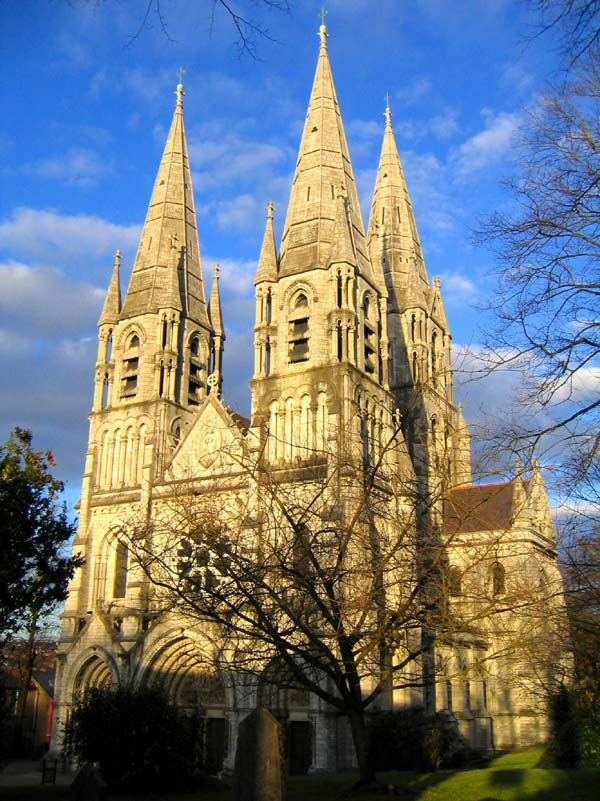
St Finbarre's Cathedral

== History of the Diocese of Cork ==
The Diocese of Cork was one of the twenty-four dioceses established at the Synod of Rathbreasail (1111 AD) on an ancient bishopric founded by Saint Finbarr in 876. On 30 July 1326, Pope John XXII, on the petition of King Edward II of England, issued a papal bull for the union of the bishoprics of Cork and Cloyne, the union to take effect on the death of either bishop. The union should have taken effect on the death of Philip of Slane in 1327, however, bishops were still appointed to each separate bishopric. The union eventually took place with Jordan Purcell appointed bishop of the united see of Cork and Cloyne in 1429. Following the Reformation, the diocese was again split and from 1583, Ross and Cork shared a bishop. In 1835 Cloyne was merged with "Ross and Cork".

== History of the Diocese of Cloyne ==
The diocese of Cloyne has its origins in the monastic settlement founded by St Colman in the 6th century. Cloyne was not one of the dioceses established at the Synod of Rathbreasail, but a bishop of Cloyne was ruling the diocese by 1148, which was recognized at the Synod of Kells in March 1152. The see was merged with Cork to form the Diocese of Cork and Cloyne in 1429.

== History of the Diocese of Ross ==
This see was founded by St. Fachtna, and the place-name was variously known as Roscairbre (Rosscarbery) and Rosailithir (Ross of the pilgrims). St. Fachtna founded the School of Ross as well as the see; and his death occurred about 590, on 14 August, on which day his feast is celebrated. At that time the chiefs of the tuath were the O'Leary, known as Uí Laoghaire Ruis Ó gCairbre. By 1160, Ross (distinct from the Scottish Diocese of Ross) was an independent bishopric. In 1207, the Norman King, John of England, granted the cantred of Rosailithir to David Roche, regardless of the claims of the native chief, the O'Driscoll, but the episcopal manors were left undisturbed. In 1306, the value of the bishop's mensa was 26 marks, while the cathedral was valued at 3 marks; and the tribal revenue of the see was 45 pounds sterling. The number of parishes was 29, divided into three divisions; and there was a Cistercian abbey, Carrigilihy (de fonte vivo); also a Benedictine Priory at St. Mary's, Ross. The Franciscans acquired a foundation at Sherkin Island from the O'Driscolls in 1460.

Blessed Thady MacCarthy was appointed Bishop of Ross in 1482, but was forcibly deprived of his see in 1488 However, he was translated to the united bishopric of Cork and Cloyne in 1490; was again a victim of political intrigues, and died a confessor at Ivrea in 1492, being beatified in 1895. In 1517 the revenue of the diocese was 60 marks. At that date the chapter was complete with 12 canons and 4 vicars, and there were 27 parishes, including three around Berehaven. Following the Reformation, the merged dioceses of "Cork and Cloyne" were again split, with Ross and Cork sharing a bishop from 1583 onwards.

== Cathedrals ==
- Saint Finbarre's Cathedral, Cork city, Cork.
- Cathedral Church of St. Fachtna, Rosscarbery, Ross.
- St. Coleman's Cathedral, Cloyne.

== Parishes ==
=== Diocese of Cork ===
The Diocese of Cork has 14 parishes with 40 churches (excluding the cathedral)

- Aghadown, St Matthew's Church, Aghadown - parish of Ballydehob
- Ballydehob, St Matthias - parish of Ballydehob
- Ballinadee - parish of Ballymodan
- Ballymartle - parish of Kinsale
- Ballymodan, St Peter's Church, Ballymodan - parish of Ballymodan
- Beara, St Peter - parish of Kilmocomogue
- Blackrock St Michael, St Michael - parish of Douglas
- Brinny Church - parish of Ballymodan
- Carrigaline, St Mary - parish of Carriglaine
- Carrigrohane, St Peter - parish of Carrigrohane
- Cork, St Anne Shandon
- Crookhaven, St Brendan - parish of Kilmoe
- Desertserges - parish of Kinneigh
- Douglas, St Luke - parish of Douglas
- Drimoleague, St Matthew - parish of Fanlobbus
- Drinagh, Christ Church - parish of Fanlobbus
- Dunmanway St Edmund - parish of Fanlobbus
- Durrus, St James the Apostle - parish of Kilmocomogue
- Garrycloyne - parish of Carrigrohane
- Fanlobbus, St Mary - parish of Fanlobbus
- Frankfield, Holy Trinity - parish of Douglas
- Inniscarra, Senan - parish of Carrigrohane
- Innishannon, Christ Church - parish of Ballymodan
- Kilbonane, St Mark - parish of Moviddy
- Kilmeen, Christ Church - parish of Kinneigh
- Kilmocomogue
- Kilmurry, St Andrew - parish of Moviddy
- Kinneigh, St Bartholomew - parish of Kinneigh
- Kinsale, Church of St Multose - parish of Kinsale
- Marmullane, St Mary - parish of Douglas
- Monkstown, St John - parish of Carriglaine
- Murragh, St Patrick - parish of Kinneigh
- Nohoval - parish of Templebreedy
- Rathclaren - parish of Ballymodan
- Schull, Holy Trinity - parish of Kilmoe
- Teampol-Na-Mbocht - parish of Kilmoe
- Templemartin, St Martin - parish of Moviddy
- Templetrine - parish of Kinsale
- Templebreedy, Holy Trinity
- University College Cork

=== Diocese of Cloyne ===
The Diocese of Cloyne has 5 parishes with 19 churches.

- Ardmore - parish of Youghal
- Ardnageehy, Mary - parish of Fermoy
- Ballyhooly, Christ Church - parish of Fermoy
- Brigown, St George - parish of Fermoy
- Castlemartyr, St Anne - parish of Youghal
- Castletownroche - parish of Mallow
- Cloyne, St Colman's Cathedral - parish of Cloyne
- Cobh & Glanmire - parish of Cobh & Glanmire Union
- Corkbeg, St Michael & All Angels - parish of Cloyne
- Doneraile, St Mary - parish of Mallow
- Fermoy, Christ Church - parish of Fermoy
- Gurranekennefeake, Holy Trinity - parish of Cloyne
- Knockmourne, St Luke - parish of Fermoy
- Little Island, St Lappan - parish of Cobh & Glanmire Union
- Mallow, St James - parish of Mallow
- Midleton, St John the Baptist- parish of Cloyne
- Rathcooney - parish of Cobh & Glanmire Union
- Rushbrooke, Christ Church - parish of Cobh & Glanmire Union
- Youghal, St Mary - parish of Youghal

=== Diocese of Ross ===
The Diocese of Ross has three parishes with 13 churches.

- Abbeystrewry - parish of Abbeystrewry
- Caheragh, St Mary - parish of Abbeystrewry
- Castlehaven - parish of Abbeystrewry
- Castleventry - parish of Ross
- Courtmacsherry, St John the Evangelist - parish of Kilgariffe
- Kilfaughnabeg, Christ Church - parish of Ross
- Kilgariffe - parish of Kilgariffe
- Kilmacabea - parish of Ross
- Kilmalooda, All Saints' Church - parish of Kilgariffe
- Myross - parish of Ross
- Rosscarbery, St Fachtna's Cathedral - parish of Ross
- Timoleague, The Ascension - parish of Kilgariffe
- Tullagh, St Matthew - parish of Abbeystrewry

== Education and faith development ==
There are a number Church of Ireland primary and secondary schools in the diocese, with the Bishop as the patron. There is also a children's ministry which organizes events outside the school system. Developing from the Bishop's Course in Theology, recently the Certificate in Christian Studies (validated by St. Patrick's College, Maynooth) has been delivered in the Diocese.

== See also ==
- List of Anglican dioceses in the United Kingdom and Ireland
- Diocese of Cork
- Diocese of Ross (Ireland)
- Diocese of Ross (Scotland)
- Roman Catholic Diocese of Cloyne
- Archdeacon of Cork
- Archdeacon of Cloyne
- Archdeacon of Ross
