= Davao earthquakes =

Davao earthquake may refer to:

- 2019 Davao del Sur earthquake
- 2021 Davao Oriental earthquake
- 2021 Davao del Sur earthquake
- 2025 Davao Oriental earthquakes

== See also ==
- List of earthquakes in the Philippines
