= July 2019 Cotabato earthquake =

Earthquake in the Philippines

July 2019 Cotabato Earthquake
- Location within Mindanao mainland Location within Philippines
- UTC time: 2019-07-09 12:36:58
- ISC event
- USGS-ANSS: ComCat
- Local date: July 9, 2019
- Local time: 8:36:58 PM PST
- Duration: 20-30 sec
- Magnitude: 5.6 M_{w}
- Depth: 10.0 km (6.2 mi)
- Epicenter: 6.814°N 125.119°E Makilala, Cotabato
- Fault: Makilala Fault
- Type: strike-slip
- Areas affected: Mindanao
- Total damage: 106 schools, 119 houses, and 14 other infrastructures damaged
- Max. intensity: MMI VI (PEIS VI)
- Aftershocks: Some, Strongest - 5.3 M_{w}
- Casualties: 1 dead, 3 injured (Mainshock); 70 injured (Aftershock)

On July 9, 2019, at 8:36 PM (PST), an earthquake measuring M_{w} 5.6 jolted the province of North Cotabato, Davao del Sur, and other nearby provinces. The National Disaster Risk Reduction and Management Council reported one dead and three injured in Makilala after the earthquake, and a total of 164 families affected in Cotabato Province. Near the epicenter of the earthquake (8 km W of Makilala, Cotabato), the severity of strong ground motion was assigned VI (Strong) on the Modified Mercalli intensity scale. A total of 106 schools, 119 houses, and 14 other infrastructures were damaged by the earthquake.

== Tectonic setting ==
The Philippine islands were formed in evolutionary processes involving subductions, collisions, and strike-slip faulting. Earthquakes are frequent there as a result of collision processes between the Philippine Sea Plate (PSP) and the Sunda Plate (SP). The slip convergence between PSP and the SP boundary is obliquely accommodated by the Philippine fault system, which is a major left-lateral strike-slip fault system. The Philippine fault has been slipping at a rate of 33 ± 11 mm/yr in the northern and central Leyte sections. The southern part of the Philippine fault is mainly located in eastern Mindanao and constitutes a complex fault system with discrete strands and splays. Mindanao island is located on the complex collision boundary between the SP and the PSP. Some parts of the convergence between these plates are consumed by the Philippine fault and subduction at the Cotabato trench. Some other parts of the convergence are accommodated by the fault system in Mindanao, and a series of strike-slip faults have developed.

== Earthquake and aftershocks ==
The earthquake was measured M_{w} 5.6 by the Philippine Institute of Volcanology and Seismology and European-Mediterranean Seismological Centre at a shallow depth of 10 km, with the epicenter located at 06.83°N, 125.02°E.

The maximum intensity was recorded as VI on the Modified Mercalli Intensity Scale (MMI) and also on PHIVOLCS Earthquake Intensity Scale (PEIS). The focal mechanism indicated strike-slip movement on the Makilala Fault.

There were moderately strong aftershocks ranging Magnitude 4.0 +, yet there were no foreshocks before the event. The strongest aftershock rocked Cotabato and Davao del Sur the day after the main event. It was recorded at M_{w} 5.3 by USGS and M_{w} 5.0 by PHIVOLCS; it was a perceived V (Moderately Strong) earthquake on the PHIVOLCS Earthquake Intensity Scale and VI on the Modified Mercalli intensity scale by the United States Geological Survey. It was initially thought to be a separate event but was reclassified as a moderately strong aftershock. In Davao del Sur, many students fainted and lost consciousness after the tremor, forcing class suspensions. Over 70 people were injured. This was the first strong earthquake that happened in Cotabato and Davao del Sur for the past years.

The earthquake occurred in a region within a faulting zone known as the Cotabato fault system, which is a seismically active region due to the presence of several active faults, including the NW-SE trending Makilala-Malungon, M'lang, North and South Columbio and Tangbulan faults, and the SW-NE trending Makilala and Balabag faults. These faults may work with subduction zones to accommodate different components of regional tectonic strain in the slip partitioning system caused by the relative motion between the PSP and SP. Characterizing the geometrical complexity of these source faults has great significance for understanding the seismotectonic implications of the large earthquakes occurring in Mindanao.

== Damage and casualties ==
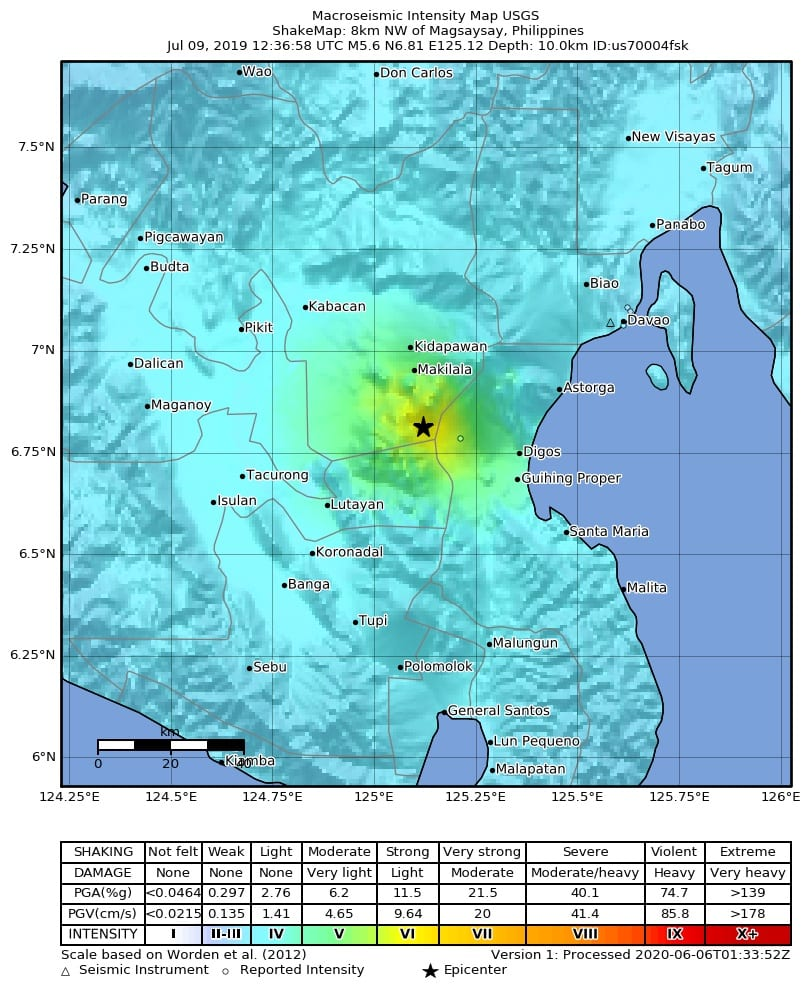
Macroseismic Intensity Shakemap of the Jul 09 2019 Cotabato Earthquake

The place where the most damage was reported was in the small town of Makilala, Cotabato, in which more than 100 homes were damaged. One person died from cardiac arrest, and three others suffered injuries. There was also damage in Kidapawan City. Many infrastructures and homes were partially damaged in Kidapawan. Damage was also observed in Davao del Sur (Magsaysay, Matanao, Bansalan, and Digos). Tulunan, M'lang, Antipas, and Matalam in Cotabato, where another 70 persons were injured in an aftershock. Central Mindanao was most affected in the earthquake.

== See also ==
- List of earthquakes in 2019
- List of earthquakes in the Philippines
- 2019 Cotabato earthquakes
- 2019 Davao del Sur earthquake
- 2021 Davao del Sur earthquake
