= 2021 Davao Oriental earthquake =

Earthquake in the Philippines

2021 Davao Oriental Earthquake
- Location within Mindanao Location within Philippines
- UTC time: 2021-08-11 17:46:12
- ISC event: 620983080
- USGS-ANSS: ComCat
- Local date: August 12, 2021
- Local time: 01:46:12
- Duration: 2 - 3 minutes
- Magnitude: 7.1 M_{w}
- Depth: 55.1 km (34.2 mi)
- Epicenter: 6.30°N 126.87°E
- Fault: Philippine Trench
- Areas affected: Mindanao
- Max. intensity: MMI VII (PEIS V)
- Tsunami: Yes
- Foreshocks: 4.4 M_{w}
- Aftershocks: Multiple, Strongest - 5.7
- Casualties: 1 dead

On August 12, 2021, at 01:46:12 PST, a strong M_{w} 7.1 earthquake struck the island of Mindanao at a depth of 55.1 kilometers (34.2 mi). It had a maximum perceived Intensity V on the PHIVOLCS Earthquake Intensity Scale. No damage or injuries were reported but a young man was killed by the earthquake.

== Tectonic setting ==
The Philippines islands were formed in evolutionary processes involving Subductions, and collisions. Earthquakes are frequent there as a result of collision processes between the Philippine Sea Plate (PSP) and the Sunda Plate (SP). The slip convergence between PSP and the SP boundary is obliquely accommodated by the Philippine fault system, which is a major left-lateral strike-slip fault system. The Philippine fault has been slipping at a rate of 33 ± 11 mm/yr in the northern and central Leyte sections. The southern part of the Philippine fault is mainly located in eastern Mindanao and constitutes a complex fault system with discrete strands and splays. Mindanao island is located on the complex collision boundary between the SP and the PSP. Some parts of the convergence between these plates are consumed by the Philippine fault and subduction at the Cotabato trench.

== Earthquake ==
Modified Mercalli intensities in selected locations
MMI	Locations	Population exposure
MMI VII (Very strong)	Pondaguitan	276,000
MMI VI (Strong)	Mati	806,000
MMI V (Moderate)	Davao City	7.03 million
MMI IV (Light)	Tandag	13.1 million

The earthquake struck near Davao Oriental early on Thursday morning, August 12. PHIVOLCS earlier listed the earthquake as magnitude 7.3 at a depth of 69 kilometers, then revised its advisory to a magnitude 7.2 earthquake, which occurred at a depth of 50 kilometers. It later reverted to its original report of a magnitude 7.3 earthquake. At 6:06 am, PHIVOLCS further revised its report to a magnitude 7.1 earthquake, at a depth of 39 km (kilometers). The United States Geological Survey also measured the quake at 7.1.

PHIVOLCS Reported Intensities
Intensity Scale	Location
V	City of Mati, Baganga, Governor Generoso, and Lupon, Davao Oriental; City of Panabo, City of Tagum, and Carmen, Davao del Norte; Nabunturan, Davao de Oro; City of General Santos; Alabel, and Malungon, Sarangani; Sarangani, Davao Occidental
IV	City of Davao; Kiblawan, Davao del Sur; City of Koronadal, Banga, Polomolok, Tampakan, and Tupi, South Cotabato; Glan, Malapatan, and Kiamba, Sarangani; Monkayo, Davao de Oro
III	City of Kidapawan, and Kabacan, Cotabato; City of Bayugan, Agusan del Sur; Maasim, Sarangani; Norala, Surallah, Santo Niño, and T'boli, South Cotabato
II	City of Cagayan de Oro; City of Tacurong, and President Quirino, Sultan Kudarat; City of Bislig, and Hinatuan, Surigao del Sur; Talakag, Bukidnon; Alamada, Antipas, Arakan, Banisilan, Magpet, and President Roxas, Cotabato
I	Mambajao, Camiguin

The Philippine Institute of Volcanology and Seismology (PHIVOLCS) reported in a bulletin that the earthquake, which was tectonic in origin, struck at 1:46 am off the coast of Davao Oriental. PHIVOLCS said that there was no tsunami threat but damage and aftershocks were expected.

Local authorities have deployed personnel to assess structures for any damage and injuries following the earthquake. In Davao City, workers of different businesses went out of their offices due to the earthquake.

Mindanao is regularly rocked by quakes due to its location on the Pacific "Ring of Fire".

Aftershocks ranging in magnitude 4's and 5's followed after the mainshock early morning in Philippines. A moderately strong shallow aftershock was felt at midnight on August 12. The strongest aftershocks were reported magnitude 5.1 and 5.7 intensities of III. The earthquake was felt mostly all over Mindanao and lasted for more than a minute.

Foreshock, Mainshock and Aftershocks of the August 2021 Davao Oriental earthquake (United States Geological Survey)
Date	Time (UST)	Magnitude 5.0 ^ M_{w}	Intensity	Depth	Location	Reference
August 11	9:44 AM	4.4	None	63.3 km	017 km S 05° W of Tarragona (Davao Oriental)	
August 12	1:46 AM	7.1	VII	57.7km	60 km ENE of Pondaguitan, Philippines	
August 12	10:26 AM	5.2	None	35km	125 km ESE of Pondaguitan, Philippines	
August 12	11:42 PM	5.1	III	35km	107 km ESE of Pondaguitan, Philippines	
August 12	11:53 PM	5.7	III	10km	Philippine Islands region	
August 13	2:01 AM	5.0	None	10km	109 km E of Pondaguitan, Philippines	
August 13	4:17 AM	5.3	None	64km	111 km ESE of Pondaguitan, Philippines	
August 13	4:28 AM	5.3	None	35km	113 km ESE of Pondaguitan, Philippines	
August 13	5:03 AM	5.3	None	47km	114 km ESE of Pondaguitan, Philippines	
August 14	9:27 AM	5.1	None	53km	108 km ESE of Pondaguitan, Philippines	

=== Tsunami ===
A tsunami was generated with recorded wave heights of 6.1 cm at Bitung, Indonesia and 3 cm at Davao City, Philippines.

== Other events ==
An earthquake measuring a magnitude of 7.0 struck the same location on January 21, 2021. Despite the location, there is no evidence of a casual relationship between these two events due to the long period of time between them.

== Damage and casualties ==
The Department of Transportation said there were only minor cracks on the runway of the airport in Mati, but no damage to the passenger terminal. There was no damage at Francisco Bangoy International Airport as well as port facilities and public terminals in the region, it added. Despite that there is no damage reported.

A 20-year-old man in Tandag died after being hit in the head by falling coconuts following the earthquake.

== See also ==
- List of earthquakes in 2021
- List of earthquakes in the Philippines
- 2021 Davao del Sur earthquake
