= 1973 Ragay Gulf earthquake =

Earthquake in the Philippines

- Location within Luzon
- UTC time: 1973-03-17 08:30:51
- ISC event: 762981
- USGS-ANSS: ComCat
- Local date: March 17, 1973
- Local time: 16:30:51 PST
- Magnitude: 7.4 M_{w}
- Depth: 33 km (21 mi)
- Epicenter: 13.372°N 122.787°E
- Fault: Philippine Fault
- Type: Strike-Slip
- Areas affected: Quezon, and Camarines Sur, Philippines
- Total damage: $2 million
- Max. intensity: PEIS VIII (MMI IX)
- Aftershocks: 5.4 M_{w}
- Casualties: 15 dead, ~100 injured

The 1973 Ragay Gulf earthquake occurred at around 16:30 local time (UTC +8). It measured 7.4 M_{w} and had a maximum intensity of IX (Violent) on the Modified Mercalli intensity scale. The Philippine Institute of Volcanology and Seismology assigned a maximum intensity of VIII (Very Destructive) on the PHIVOLCS earthquake intensity scale. It killed 14 people, injured 100 others and caused an estimated $2 million in damage.

== Earthquake ==
The epicenter was located around 17 km east northeast of San Andres in Ragay Gulf with a depth of 33 km (20.5 mi). It was due to the movement of one of the Philippines' largest fault; the Philippine fault system with the focal mechanism corresponding to strike-slip.

=== Surface rupture and fissures ===
The earthquake produced an onshore surface rupture 30 km along the Guinayangan segment of the Philippine Fault. It also caused left-lateral offset on a beach line for approximately 3.2 meters. There were also fissures, one of them being 15 centimeters in width. Two more fissures were found though with unknown lengths, along the foothills northwest of the Philippine National Railways (PNR) terminal in the municipality of Calauag. Near eastern bank of the Calauag River, multiple mudboils were spotted.

== Damage ==
=== Calauag ===
According to PHIVOLCS, in Calauag, Quezon, the worst hit, 270 houses were partially damaged, and 98 completely destroyed; most of which were poorly built or entirely made of wooden materials. In Barrio Sumulong, also part of Calauag, 70% of school buildings were damaged.

=== Lopez ===
In the neighboring town of Lopez, concrete hollow blocks of the walls in a 5-room PTA building of the Lopez Provincial School collapsed. A three-storey concrete residential building tilted to the north. The facade of the Rosario Catholic Church of Lopez suffered cracks. In Barrio Hondagua, a theater which was converted into a restaurant collapsed completely and a chapel was partially destroyed. The concrete columns of the housings of the conveyor machines of the Philippine Flour Mills buckled down.

=== Transportation ===
The earthquake caused damage to all forms of transportation linking to and from Bicol Region. At least four highway bridges on the Manila South Road suffered severe damage. A PNR bridge crossing the Calauag River, and about 600 meters north of the highway bridge was badly damaged though it did not collapse. Another PNR bridge in Morato Tagkawayan was slightly moved. Its ties moved eight centimeters to the east, and the base plate of its westerns abutment moved five centimeters to the south.

=== Agriculture ===
The agricultural near the epicenter of the quake were mainly coconut plantations. The tremor's effects on the industry were not immediately felt, however after a few months, coconut production was on a down low due to young nuts that were shaken by the earthquake.

== See also ==
- List of earthquakes in the Philippines
- List of earthquakes in 1973
