= 2021 Davao del Sur earthquake =

M 6.0 earthquake in Mindanao, Philippines

2021 Davao del Sur Earthquake
- Location within Mindanao mainland Location within Philippines
- UTC time: 2021-02-07 04:22:56
- ISC event: 619810844
- USGS-ANSS: ComCat
- Local date: February 7, 2021
- Local time: 12:22 PST
- Duration: 1-2 minutes
- Magnitude: 6.0 M_{ww} 6.1 M_{w}
- Depth: 16.0 km (9.9 mi)
- Epicenter: 6.769°N 125.101°E
- Fault: Makilala-Malungon Fault
- Type: Strike-slip
- Areas affected: Philippines
- Total damage: 25 buildings damaged
- Max. intensity: PEIS VII (MMI VII)
- Landslides: 7 landslides in Makilala, Cotabato
- Aftershocks: Some, Strongest is 4.8 M_{w}
- Casualties: 14 injured

On February 7, 2021, at 12:22 PM PST, an earthquake measuring M_{ww} 6.0 struck Davao del Sur and Cotabato. The event registered a Modified Mercalli Intensity Scale (MMI) of VII (Very Strong) with VII on the PHIVOLCS Earthquake Intensity Scale (PEIS).

== Tectonic setting ==
The Philippines islands were formed in evolutionary processes involving subductions, collisions, and strike-slip faulting. Earthquakes are frequent there as a result of collision processes between the Philippine Sea Plate (PSP) and the Sunda Plate (SP). The slip convergence between PSP and the SP boundary is obliquely accommodated by the Philippine fault system, which is a major left-lateral strike-slip fault system. The Philippine fault has been slipping at a rate of 33 ± 11 mm/yr in the northern and central Leyte sections. The southern part of the Philippine fault is mainly located in eastern Mindanao and constitutes a complex fault system with discrete strands and splays. Mindanao island is located on the complex collision boundary between the SP and the PSP. Some parts of the convergence between these plates are consumed by the Philippine fault and subduction at the Cotabato trench. Some other parts of the convergence are accommodated by the fault system in Mindanao, and a series of strike-slip faults have developed.

== Earthquake ==
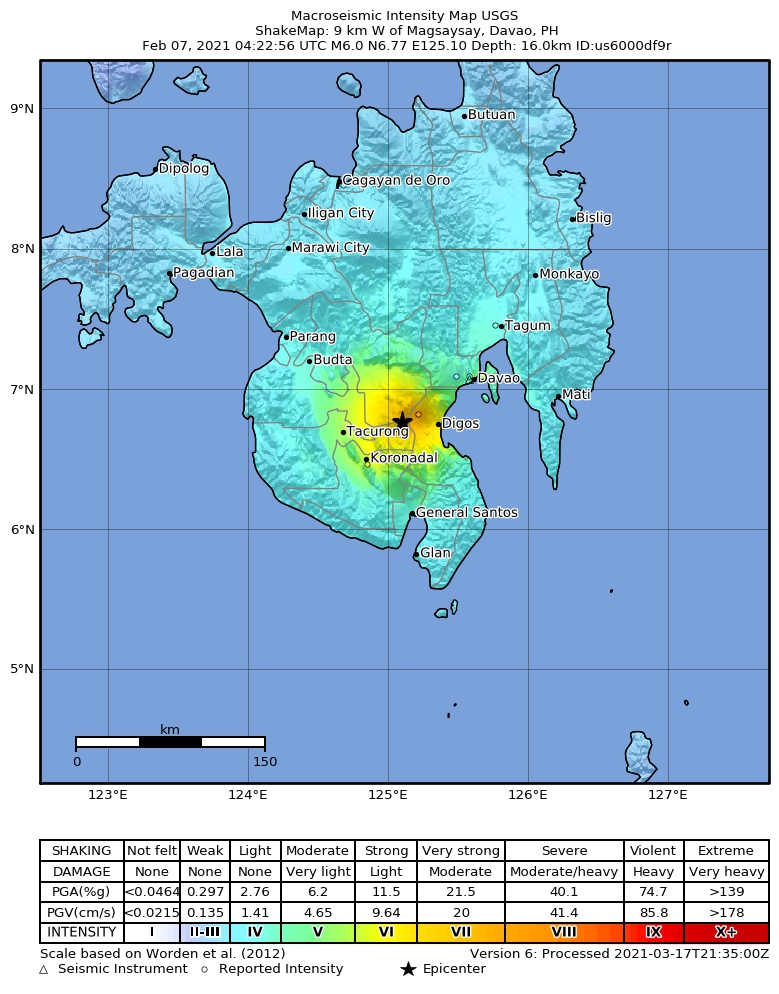
Macroseismic Intensity Shakemap of the Feb 07 2021 Davao del Sur Earthquake

It was first recorded as magnitude 6.3 by the Philippine Institute of Volcanology and Seismology, which later downgraded it to M_{w} 6.1 at a shallow depth of 10 km. There was a foreshock which preceded the main quake, recorded M_{w} 4.8 at 7:28 AM PST by Philippine Institute of Volcanology and Seismology with a PHIVOLCS Earthquake Intensity Scale of IV (Moderately Strong). The foreshock lasted 10–15 seconds which made people feel dizzy and nauseated.

Later, on 12:22 PM PST; a M_{w} 6.1 struck 9 km West of Magsaysay, Davao del Sur. Same epicenter of the foreshock. It perceived an Intensity VII (Very Strong) on the Modified Mercalli intensity scale and PHIVOLCS Earthquake Intensity Scale. Damage and aftershocks were expected after the earthquake.

The Shakemap of USGS showed that it was also VII (Very strong).

Earthquake report PHIVOLCS
| Intensity Scale | Location |
|---|---|
| VII | M'Lang, Makilala and Kabacan, Cotabato |
| VI | Isulan, Sultan Kudarat |
| V | Magsaysay, Digos City, Hagonoy, Santa Cruz, Sulop, Bansalan and Matanao, Davao Del Sur; Pres. Roxas, Arakan, Carmen, Kidapawan City, Matalam and Tulunan, Cotabato; Koronadal City, Banga, Tupi and Tampakan, South Cotabato; Malungon, Sarangani; Columbio, Sultan Kudarat |
| IV | Davao City and Padada, Davao Del Sur; Antipas, Banisilan, Midsayap, Cotabato; Alabel, Kiamba, Malapatan, Sarangani; General Santos City; Norala, Polomolok, South Cotabato; Bagumbayan, Esperanza, Lutayan, Palimbang, Pres. Quirino, Sen. Ninoy Aquino, Tacurong City, Sultan Kudarat; Don Carlos, Bukidnon |
| III | Maco and Nabunturan, Davao De Oro; Tagum City, Davao Del Norte; Malalag, Davao Del Sur; Cotabato City; Aleosan, Cotabato; T'Boli, South Cotabato; Kadingilan and Kitaotao, Bukidnon; Datu Odin Sinduat, Maguindanao; Balingasag, Medina, Cagayan De Oro City, Gingoog, Salay and Tagaloan, Misamis Oriental; Kalamansig, Lambayong and Lebak, Sultan Kudarat |
| II | Alamada, Cotabato; Tantangan, South Cotabato; Baungon, Damulog, Kalilangan, Libona, Maramag, Talakag, Malaybalay City and Valencia City, Bukidnon; Iligan City, El Salvador and Manticao, Misamis Oriental |
| I | Bislig City, Surigao Del Sur |

The earthquake lasted for a minute and was produced by the Makilala-Malungon Fault which PHIVOLCS stated that could possibly produce a Magnitude 7.2 earthquake, with a possible Intensity VIII. Eight minutes after the mainshock a M_{w} 3.5 aftershock followed which felt III. Aftershocks rocked for one month which the strongest was the February 17, 2021 - Mw 4.8 in Magsaysay Davao del Sur (Intensity IV) and Mw 3.6 (Intensity III), February 24, 2021 - Ms 4.1 in Magsaysay Davao del Sur (Intensity III), March 1, 2021 - Ms 4.8 in Columbio Sultan Kudarat (Intensity IV) and Ms 3.1 (Intensity III), and March 4, 2021 - Ms 4.1 in Magsaysay Davao del Sur (Intensity III).

More than 40 aftershocks were recorded the day after the quake.

The earthquake came from an area that produced a similar sequence of earthquakes in October 2019 and December 2019, within an active faulting zone known as the Cotabato fault system, which includes the NW-SE trending Makilala-Malungon, M'lang, North and South Columbio and Tangbulan faults, and the SW-NE trending Makilala and Balabag faults. These faults may work with subduction zones to accommodate different components of regional tectonic strain in the slip partitioning system caused by the relative motion between the PSP and SP. Characterizing the geometrical complexity of these source faults has great significance for understanding the seismotectonic implications of the large earthquakes occurring in Mindanao.

== Damage and casualties ==
National Disaster Risk Reduction and Management Council teams and Engineers immediately conducted damage inspection to buildings and houses and casualties. Three people were injured during the quake. In Cotabato province, another three persons were injured in the town of Makilala. Two churches and 21 houses were damaged in M'lang and Kabacan. One hospital was damaged in Isulan, Sultan Kudarat. At least seven landslides were reported in Makilala, and cracks as long as 5–10 meters found their way to the floors of houses, while some walls collapsed at Sitio B'yao, New Esperanza village of M'lang. An hour later the number of injured rose to four. One mall in Davao del Sur had visible outside cracks.

== See also ==
- List of earthquakes in 2021
- List of earthquakes in the Philippines
- 2019 Davao del Sur earthquake
- 2019 Cotabato earthquakes
