= 2012 Negros earthquake =

Earthquake in the Philippines

- Location within Visayas Location within Philippines
- UTC time: 2012-02-06 03:49:12
- ISC event: 600321522
- USGS-ANSS: ComCat
- Local date: February 6, 2012
- Local time: 11:49:11 PST
- Magnitude: 6.7 M_{w} 6.9 mb
- Depth: 10 km (6.2 mi)
- Epicenter: 9°58′N 123°08′E
- Type: Thrust
- Areas affected: Philippines (Negros Oriental, Negros Occidental and Cebu)
- Total damage: Structural collapse, landslides
- Max. intensity: PEIS VII (MMI VII)
- Tsunami: 5 m (16 ft)
- Landslides: Yes
- Aftershocks: 1,600+ (as of February 7, 2012, 7:45 PST)
- Casualties: 113 dead, 112 injured

The 2012 Negros earthquake occurred on February 6, 2012 at 11:49 AM PST, with a body wave magnitude of 6.7 and a maximum intensity of VII (Destructive) off the coast of Negros Oriental, Philippines. The epicenter of the thrust fault earthquake was approximately 72 kilometres (45 mi) north of Negros Oriental's provincial capital, Dumaguete.

== Earthquake ==
The recorded intensities according to the Philippine Institute of Volcanology and Seismology (PHIVOLCS) on the Earthquake Intensity Scale (PEIS) were VII in Dumaguete and V in Cebu. The earthquake was felt as far as Mindanao in the provinces of Misamis and Lanao as well as Iligan.

Intensity Scale	Location
VII	Dumaguete; Vallehermoso, Tayasan Negros Oriental
VI	La Carlota City and La Castellana, Negros Occidental; Argao, Cebu
V	Roxas City; Dao and Ivisan, Capiz; Iloilo City; Ayungon, Negros Oriental; Kanlaon City; Lapu-lapu City; Guimaras; Cebu City; San Carlos City; Bacolod City; Sagay City; Tagbilaran City; Candoni, Binalbagan, Negros Occidental.
IV	San Jose de Buenavista, Pandan, Anini-y, Patnungon, Antique; Kalibo, Aklan; Dipolog City; Sipalay, Negros Occidental; Ormoc City
III	Butuan City, Agusan del Norte; Legaspi City, Albay; Carmen, Cagayan de Oro; Tacloban City; Catbalogan; Saint Bernard, Southern Leyte; Masbate, Masbate; Cagayan de Oro City
II	Cabid-an, Sorsogon; Borongan, Eastern Samar; Mambajao, Camiguin
I	Pagadian City

=== Geology ===
The Philippines lies within the Pacific Ring of Fire, which results in the archipelago experiencing frequent volcanic and seismic activity. The strongest earthquake to hit Negros occurred in 1948, but did not cause any damage.

According to PHIVOLCS, the earthquake was caused by movement on a previously undiscovered fault. However, according to an Environmental Sciences professor, this fault was already known to private geologists hired by the Negros Occidental government to create a land use map for the province.

=== Tsunami ===
The Philippine Institute of Volcanology and Seismology (PHIVOLCS) issued a level two tsunami alert, indicating that the public should be alert for "unusual waves", but no formal evacuation orders were issued. Tsunami waves reported to be as high as 5 metres (16 feet) were reported to have struck Barangays Martilo, Pisong, and Magtalisay in La Libertad. Coastal areas on the eastern seaboard of Negros Oriental from San Jose to Vallehermoso, and on the western side of Cebu from Badian to Barili were also reported to have been affected by the tsunami, though no widespread damage was reported.

=== "Chona Mae" hoax ===
In Cebu City, rumors that a tsunami had hit the coastal villages of Ermita, Mambaling, and Pasil, with some reports saying that the tsunami had reached as far as Barangay Lahug, forced residents into a panic. This is despite the fact that Cebu City, being on the eastern side of Cebu island, is opposite to the side facing Negros, the epicenter of the earthquake, and could not have been hit by a tsunami from the earthquake. The ensuing panic forced many businesses, schools, and offices in Cebu City to close for the day. Residents fled to the mountainous areas of the city, all the way up to Barangay Busay, more than 10 kilometres (6.2 miles) away from downtown Cebu City.

The cause of the panic was credited to, anecdotally, have come from someone who was calling out for someone named "Chona Mae", which eventually morphed mistakenly into a cry for "tsunami". The earthquake, which happened nearly a year after the 2011 Tōhoku earthquake and tsunami and its effects in Japan, was also attributed as a factor to the panic.

Some residents of Dumaguete also scrambled to the mountain town of Valencia also because of rumors of a tsunami, which were later confirmed to be false. PHIVOLCS issued the tsunami alert at 14:30 PST, however no tsunami followed.

== Damage and effects ==
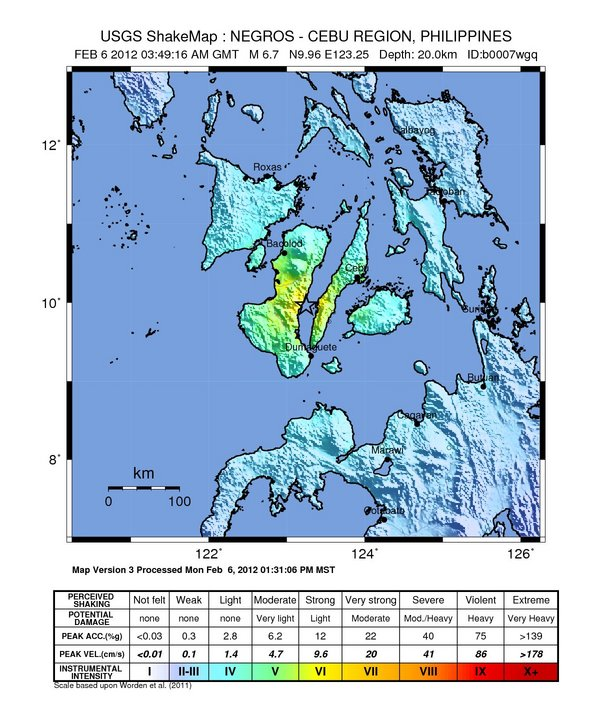
USGS ShakeMap

The degree and extent of damage caused by the earthquake was significant, with most of the damage sustained during the initial earthquake. The towns that experienced the most damage were the towns of Tayasan, Jimalalud, La Libertad, and the city of Guihulngan, in Negros Oriental. Several houses and buildings collapsed, while others sustained more minor damage. The earthquake also triggered numerous landslides which buried houses and people, including in the areas of Barangay Solongon, La Libertad and Planas, Guihulngan.

Telecommunication services were disrupted after the earthquake.

=== Casualties ===
More than 100 people were killed in the earthquake, most of whom died as a result of landslides that struck villages in Negros Occidental.

=== Water ===
Water was cut off in several places, primarily the isolated remote towns. Guihulngan, one of the cities affected by the earthquake, suffered extensive damage. Its water services, along with electricity and telecommunications, were reported to be cut off.

=== Electricity ===
After the initial earthquake, the power supply was suddenly disrupted in affected areas after power lines were damaged. Power plants in Visayas tripped or shut down following the earthquake, although no major damage was sustained in transmission facilities. On February 8, power was restored in some areas.

=== Transport ===
The transport network of some parts of Cebu and Negros Oriental suffered severe disruptions. Main arterial roads were damaged, although automobiles and people could still pass through. A small number of roads, especially in the mountainous territories, were thought to be destroyed. A total of three roads and ten bridges were destroyed. Because of damage to roads and bridges, access to some remote villages was no longer possible. Most of the damage experienced was in north Negros Oriental, which is more mountainous than the rest of Negros Oriental.

=== Cultural and governmental properties ===
Among the properties destroyed by the earthquake were the public market and the courthouse of Guihulngan. The Aglipay Church in La Libertad also collapsed.

== See also ==
- 2013 Bohol earthquake
- List of earthquakes in 2012
- List of earthquakes in the Philippines
