= 2019 Davao del Sur earthquake =

Earthquake in the Philippines

- 2019 Davao del Sur earthquake (Mindanao mainland) 2019 Davao del Sur earthquake (Philippines)
- UTC time: 2019-12-15 06:11:51
- ISC event: 616987910
- USGS-ANSS: ComCat
- Local date: December 15, 2019
- Local time: 14:11 PST
- Magnitude: 6.8 M_{ww} 6.9 M_{s}
- Depth: 18.0 km (11.2 mi)
- Epicenter: 6.697°N 125.174°E
- Fault: Tangbulan Fault
- Type: Strike-slip
- Areas affected: Mindanao, Philippines
- Max. intensity: MMI VII (PEIS VII)
- Landslides: Yes
- Casualties: 13 dead, 1 missing, 210 injured

At 14:11 PST (06:11 UTC) on December 15, 2019, the province of Davao del Sur on the island of Mindanao in the Philippines was struck by an earthquake measuring 6.8 M_{ww}. It had a maximum perceived intensity of VII (Very strong) on the Modified Mercalli Intensity Scale. At least 13 people were killed and another 210 injured.

== Tectonic setting ==
Mindanao lies across the complex convergent boundary between the Sunda plate and the Philippine Sea plate. Part of the oblique convergence between these plates is taken up by subduction along the Cotabato Trench. The strike-slip component of the convergence is accommodated partly by the Philippine fault system and partly by the Cotabato Fault System, a network of mainly NW-SE trending sinistral (left-lateral) strike-slip faults that form the boundary between the Cotabato Arc and the Central Mindanao Volcanic Belt. In the area of the December 2019 earthquake, the individual faults include the NW-SE trending Makilala–Malungon Fault, Tangbulan Fault and the Central Digos Fault.

== Earthquake ==
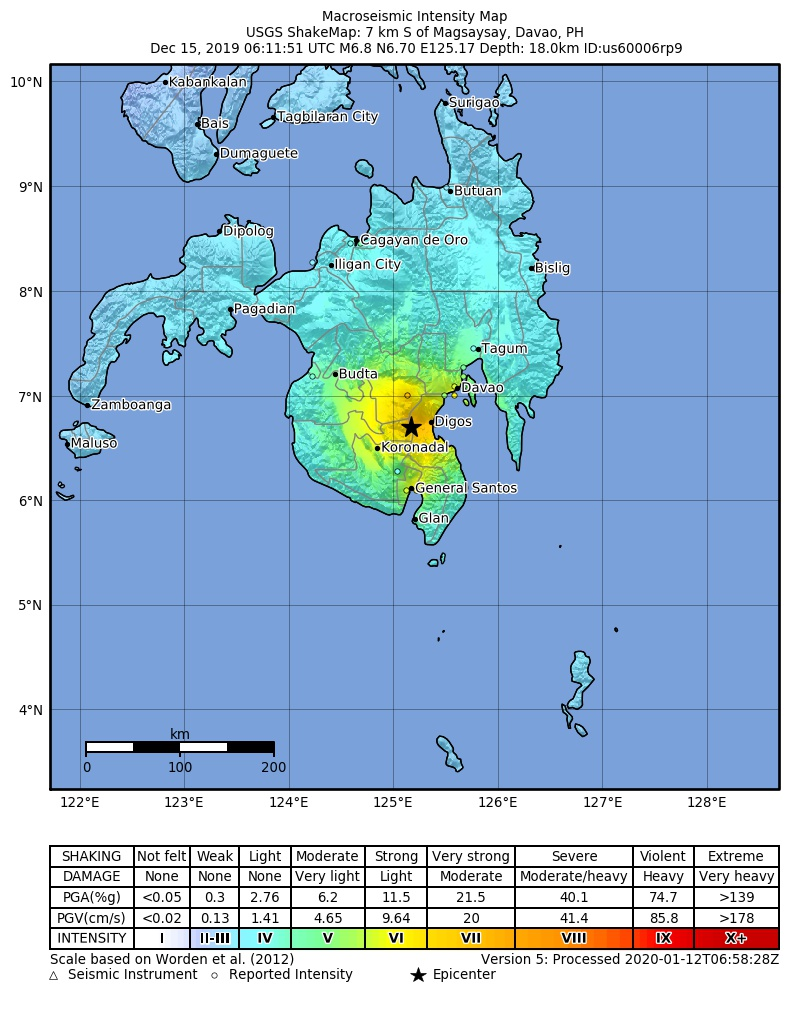
Macroseismic Intensity Shakemap of the Dec 15 2019 Davao del Sur Earthquake

The earthquake was recorded as 6.8 M_{w} by ANSS and 6.9 M_{s} by PHIVOLCS. The maximum felt intensity was assigned as VII MMI on the ANSS ShakeMap and VII PEIS in the PHIVOLCS summary for this event. The focal mechanism indicates strike-slip faulting with either sinistral movement on a NW-SE trending fault or dextral movement on a SW-NE trending fault, but the distribution of the aftershocks are consistent with the sinistral fault plane. The earthquake may be the result of movement on the Tangbulan Fault, according to PHIVOLCS.

There were a series of large aftershocks, including nine of M ≥ 5.0 in the first 48 hours after the mainshock, with the largest being an mb 5.7 event about an hour afterwards, which had a maximum felt intensity of VII (MMI).

This event followed on from a series of earthquakes that struck Mindanao during October that year. The sequence of three M>6 events affected that area to the northwest of the December earthquake. The December 15 event is likely to be related to the earlier sequence, possibly by the effects of stress transfer.

PEIS reported intensities
Intensity	Location
VII	Digos; Bansalan, Hagonoy, Kiblawan, Magsaysay, Matanao, Padada, and Santa Cruz, Davao del Sur
VI	General Santos; Kidapawan; Koronadal; Malalag and Sulop, Davao del Sur; Santa Maria, Davao Occidental; Malungon, Sarangani; Columbio, Sultan Kudarat
V	Cotabato City; Davao City; Antipas, Arakan, Carmen, Magpet, Makilala, Matalam, M'lang, and Tulunan, Cotabato; Lupon, Davao Oriental; Alabel, Glan, and Malapatan, Sarangani; Polomolok, Tampakan, and Tupi, South Cotabato
IV	Damulog, Don Carlos, Kadingilan, Kalilangan, Kitaotao, Pangantucan, and Talakag, Bukidnon; Banisilan and Pikit, Cotabato; Governor Generoso and San Isidro, Davao Oriental; Kiamba and Maasim, Sarangani; Lake Sebu, Norala, Surallah, and T'Boli, South Cotabato; Isulan, Sultan Kudarat
III	Cagayan de Oro; Gingoog; Mati and Tarragona, Davao Oriental; Dangcagan and Maramag, Bukidnon
II	Butuan; Dipolog; Impasugong and Libona, Bukidnon; Aleosan, Cotabato; Tubod, Lanao del Norte
I	Molave, Zamboanga del Sur
Instrumental intensities
VI	Davao City; Kidapawan; Alabel, Sarangani
V	General Santos
IV	Cagayan de Oro; Koronadal; Malungon, Sarangani
III	Cotabato City; Gingoog; Tupi, South Cotabato
II	Kiamba, Sarangani
I	Zamboanga City; Bislig

=== Analysis using InSAR data ===
The sequence of four earthquakes has examined using Interferometric synthetic aperture radar (InSAR). One study used information only from Sentinel-1, while the other also included information from ALOS-2. InSAR interferograms can be used to detect and quantify ground deformation associated with an earthquake, allowing the location and orientation of fault ruptures, epicenters and slip distributions to be estimated. For the second and third earthquakes in the sequence no information was recorded by either of the satellites between the events, so these events had to be analysed together. Sufficient data were available to allow the other two earthquakes to be analysed separately.

The two studies give similar results, confirming that the first and last major earthquakes in the sequence were caused by rupture along NW-SE trending left-lateral strike-slip faults, while the second and third resulted from rupture along SW-NE trending right-lateral strike-slip faults nearly orthogonal to the other two. One of the studies matched the four interpreted ruptures to known faults. The first event is interpreted to have ruptured the M'lang Fault, the second the Makilala Fault, the third the Balabag Fault and the last the Makilala-Malungon Fault. The observed sequence of earthquakes rupturing orthogonal strike-slip fault sets has been compared to the 2019 Ridgecrest earthquake sequence.

== Damage and casualties ==
The greatest damage from the earthquake was in the area around the epicenter, in the towns of Matanao, Magsaysay, Hagonoy and Padada. Significant damage was reported in 207 out of 232 barangays in Davao del Sur, five in Sarangani, three in Sultan Kudarat and North Cotabato, respectively. This earthquake added to the damage that much of the affected area suffered during the Cotabato earthquakes in October. At least one road was declared impassable in the Matanao area, a hospital was destroyed in Hagonoy and there was significant damage to a police station and fire station in Padada. A total of 5,973 houses were destroyed in Davao del Sur, with 31,832 suffering some damage and a further 32 in North Cotabato. Three hundred and ninety-seven schools and 62 health facilities were damaged in Davao del Sur, Sarangani and North Cotabato.

A six-year-old child was crushed by a wall in the barangay of Asinan in Matanao. Three others were killed and several others were trapped in Padada when a supermarket collapsed. As of December 23, at least 13 people had been killed, one remained missing and a total of 210 people were reported injured in the quake.

== Aftermath ==
As of December 29, 40,424 people from 10,505 families were reported to be sheltering in a total of 102 evacuation centers after the earthquake, with a further 100,427 people (23,321 families) being assisted by friends and family.

== See also ==
- List of earthquakes in 2019
- List of earthquakes in the Philippines
- 2019 Cotabato earthquakes
- July 2019 Cotabato earthquake
