= 2019 Eastern Samar earthquake =

2019 earthquake in the Philippines

- San Julian, Eastern Samar (Visayas) San Julian, Eastern Samar (Philippines)
- UTC time: 2019-04-23 05:37:51
- ISC event: n/a
- USGS-ANSS: ComCat
- Local date: April 23, 2019
- Local time: 1:37:51 pm (PHT)
- Magnitude: 6.5 M_{w} (PHIVOLCS) 6.4 M_{ww} (USGS)
- Depth: 61 km (38 mi)
- Epicenter: 11.79°N 125.38°E
- Areas affected: Eastern Visayas, Central Visayas, Western Visayas, Bicol Region, Caraga Region
- Max. intensity: PEIS VI (MMI VI)
- Tsunami: None
- Aftershocks: 172 (6 felt) (as of April 30, 2019)
- Casualties: 48 injured

The 2019 Eastern Samar Earthquake struck the islands of Visayas in the Philippines on April 23, 2019, at 1:37:51 p.m. (PST). It had a moment magnitude of 6.5 (M_{ww} 6.4 by USGS) and a local magnitude of 6.2 with a max intensity of VI based on the PHIVOLCS earthquake intensity scale (PEIS). The epicenter was in San Julian, Eastern Samar and the hypocenter was at a depth of 64 km(~39.76 mi). As of April 30, 2019 there were 172 aftershocks ranging from magnitudes of 1.6 to 4.6. The earthquake injured 48 people and damaged about 245 homes.

Eastern Samar is located near an active subduction zone, the Philippine trench, where the Philippine Sea plate subducts beneath the Sunda plate, and movement along the trench is what caused the earthquake.

The earthquake struck less than a day after another magnitude 6.1 earthquake in Luzon, but it was found that these earthquakes were unrelated.

== Geography ==
The Visayas Islands are located in the central part of the Philippines consisting of seven main islands that make up its land. Their topography is full of tall mountains and large plains that provide the cultivation of sugarcane and rice. Their location in the Visayas sea provides fishing opportunities for the island to obtain more food in a sustainable way. Common produce also grown here includes maize, coconuts, bananas, tobacco, and various root crops.

The location of these islands is one of the most seismically active due to the subduction zones the Philippines sits on. The multiple trenches indicate the many subduction zones around the Philippines creating these large magnitude earthquakes. The Philippines itself is right next to the Philippine Sea plate that is subducting underneath the Sunda plate on the Eastern shore of the country.

== Earthquake ==
=== Mainshock ===
Although the earthquake happened a day after an earlier earthquake struck Luzon, the state agency has stated that the Visayas earthquake is unrelated to the prior earthquake. The Visayas earthquake was determined to be caused by the movement of the Philippine Trench. The movement at the trench was specifically the Philippine Sea plate subducting below the neighboring plate, releasing seismic energy.

There was no tsunami because the earthquake occurred on land and deep underground. Forty-eight people were injured, most of them slightly by falling objects, and slight damage was reported near the epicenter. The Leyte Provincial Capitol in Tacloban sustained damage which led to the provincial government abandoning the building in May 2019, with the intention of converting the building into a museum.

“It was really very strong. at first it was moderate until 5 seconds it appears to be every infrastructure are shaking, including the basketball court that was beside our house, and even while running outside the house to look for safer ground. i myself can"- English translation of someone who was in Calbayog, reporting what was felt during the earthquake in their location.

=== Intensity ===
PEIS REPORTED INTENSITIES
Intensity	Location
PEIS VI (Very strong)	San Julian Eastern Samar;
PEIS V (Strong)	Tacloban City; Catbalogan City, Samar; General MacArthur, Salcedo and Guiuan, Eastern Samar; Naval, Biliran; Catarman, Northern Samar; Palo and Pastrana, Leyte; Lawaan and Girporlos, Eastern Samar
PEIS IV (Moderately strong)	Sorsogon City; Naga City in Camarines Sur; Iloilo City; Bislig City in Surigao del Sur; San Francisco in Southern Leyte; Abuyog, Hilongos, Javier, Capoocan, Julieta, Baybay, Barogo, Jaro, McArthur, Matalum, Villaba in Leyte and Panganiban, Catanduanes
PEIS III (Weak)	Binalbagan in Negros Occidental; Cabalian in Southern Leyte; Dimasalang in Masbate; Butuan City and Cabadbaran City in Agusan del Norte
PEIS II (Slightly felt)	Bago City and Bacolod City in Negros Occidental.

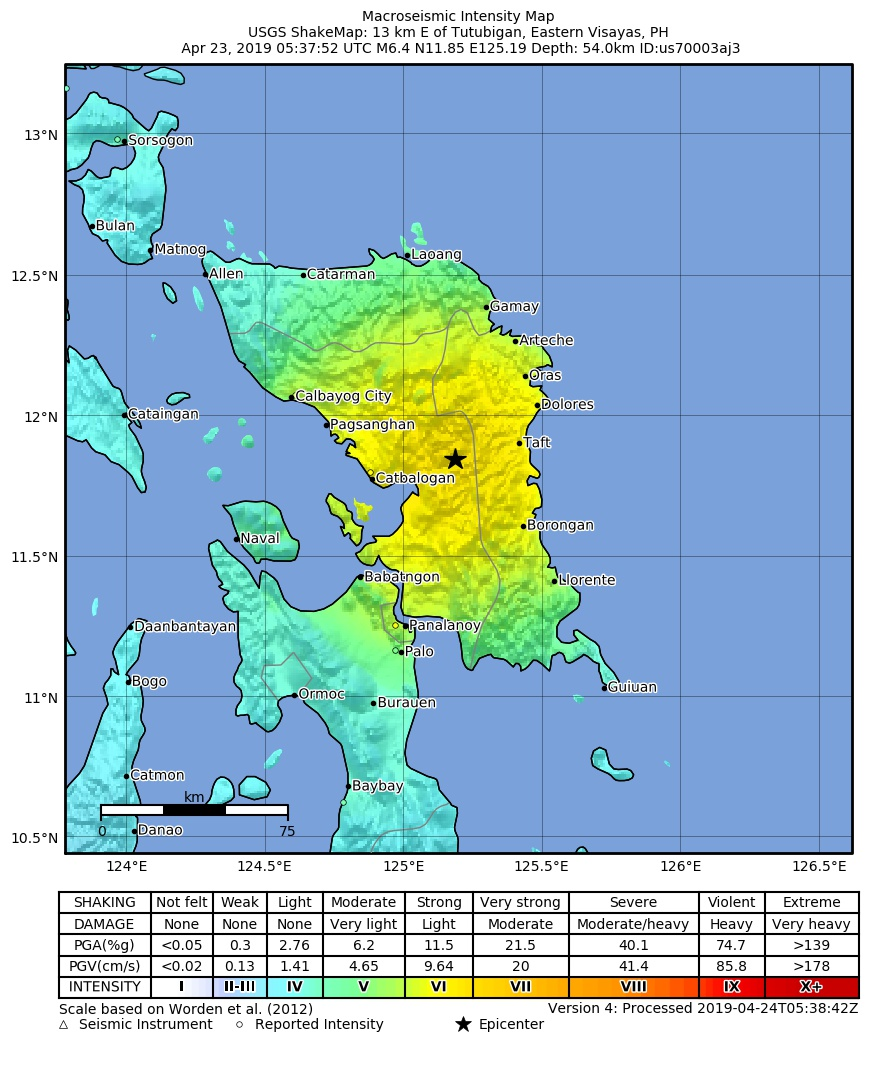
USGS Shakemap of the event

=== Aftershocks ===
This earthquake had an estimated 172 aftershocks(As of April 30, 2019) that were in many different places around Samar over the next several days, 6 of which were felt. These ranged from magnitudes of 1.6 to 4.6 with slight shaking as seen from the commenters. While it was technically possible that another earthquake of a higher magnitude could have occurred at this same location, it was extremely unlikely and did not end up happening, confirming that the 6.5 M_{w} event was the mainshock.

Aftershocks could also be felt all the way in India according to this commenter: "I was sleeping it is 1:50am in India and i was awakened by the earthquake. My neighbors ran outside and waited for sometime until the earthquake stopped."

== Damage ==
Many of the buildings near the epicenters were not built properly to withstand high magnitude earthquakes; things like tiles fell off of the ceilings and walls if they were not secured enough. A total of 245 houses were damaged with one of them fully destroyed. Along with the damaged buildings a lot of power outages occurred the day of the earthquake which was then restored within 24-hours.

== See also ==
- 2012 Negros earthquake
- 2012 Samar earthquake
- 2019 Luzon earthquake
