= 2019 Cotabato earthquakes =

Series of earthquakes in the Philippines

- 2019 Cotabato earthquakes (Mindanao) 2019 Cotabato earthquakes (Philippines)
- UTC time: A: 2019-10-16 11:37:06; B: 2019-10-29 01:04:44; C: 2019-10-31 01:11:19
- ISC event: A: 616636559; B: 616739626; C: 616742152
- USGS-ANSS: A: ComCat; B: ComCat; C: ComCat
- Local date: A: October 16, 2019; B: October 29, 2019; C: October 31, 2019
- Local time: A: 7:37 pm (PST); B: 9:04 am (PST); C: 9:11 am (PST)
- Magnitude: A: 6.4 M_{ww}; B: 6.6 M_{ww}; C: 6.5 M_{ww}
- Depth: A: 16.1 km (10 mi); B: 15.0 km (9 mi); C: 10.0 km (6 mi)
- Epicenter: 6°45′N 125°00′E; 22 km southeast of Tulunan, Cotabato
- Type: Strike-slip
- Areas affected: Soccsksargen, Davao Region, Bangsamoro, Caraga
- Max. intensity: PEIS VIII (MMI VIII)
- Tsunami: None
- Landslides: Yes
- Foreshocks: A. 5.0 Makilala – V (October 11, 2019), 4.7 Tulunan – IV (October 15, 2019)
- Casualties: October 16: 7 dead, 215 injured; October 29 and 31: 24 dead, 11 missing, 563 injured

The 2019 Cotabato earthquakes were an earthquake swarm which struck the province of Cotabato on the island of Mindanao in the Philippines in October 2019. Three of these earthquakes were above 6.0 on the moment magnitude scale with a Mercalli intensity of VIII. More than 40 people have been reported dead or missing and nearly 800 were injured as a result of these events.

== Tectonic setting ==
Mindanao lies across the complex convergent boundary between the Sunda plate and the Philippine Sea plate. Part of the oblique convergence between these plates is taken up by subduction along the Cotabato Trench. The strike-slip component of the convergence is accommodated partly by the Philippine fault system and partly by the Cotabato Fault System, a network of mainly NW-SE trending sinistral (left-lateral) strike-slip faults that form the boundary between the Cotabato Arc and the Central Mindanao Volcanic Belt. In the area of the October 2019 earthquakes series, the individual faults include the NW-SE trending South Columbio Fault, North Columbio Fault, M'Lang Fault, Makilala–Malungon Fault and Tangbulan Fault, and the SW-NE trending Makilala Fault and Balabag Fault.

== Earthquakes M≥5.0 ==
Events at or above M_{w} 5.0 associated with the 2019 Cotabato earthquakes
Date	Time (UTC)	Magnitude M_{w}	Intensity	Depth	Location	Ref.
October 16	11:37:06	6.4	VIII	16.1 km (10.0 mi)	7 km (4.3 mi) ENE of Columbio	
October 16	12:09:31	5.5	VI	9.9 km (6.2 mi)	10 km (6.2 mi) ENE of Columbio	
October 18	22:52:18	5.0	V	28.1 km (17.5 mi)	7 km (4.3 mi) W of Magsaysay	
October 19	11:44:28	5.2	III	10.0 km (6.2 mi)	4 km (2.5 mi) S of Magsaysay	
October 20	08:55:32	5.2	V	10.0 km (6.2 mi)	7 km (4.3 mi) N of Lambayong	
October 20	11:50:35	5.0	V	10.0 km (6.2 mi)	8 km (5.0 mi) WNW of Kiblawan	
October 21	11:59:43	5.1	V	10.0 km (6.2 mi)	6 km (3.7 mi) NW of Kiblawan	
October 29	01:04:44	6.6	VIII	15.0 km (9.3 mi)	14 km (8.7 mi) E of Bual	
October 29	02:22:35	5.1	V	10.0 km (6.2 mi)	1 km (0.62 mi) SE of Saguing	
October 29	02:42:39	6.1	VII	10.0 km (6.2 mi)	10 km (6.2 mi) E of Bagontapay	
October 29	08:33:12	5.4	V	10.0 km (6.2 mi)	11 km (6.8 mi) E of Bagontapay	
October 29	08:46:03	5.2	V	10.0 km (6.2 mi)	2 km (1.2 mi) SW of Dolo	
October 29	21:22:07	5.0	V	12.9 km (8.0 mi)	7 km (4.3 mi) W of Magsaysay	
October 31	01:11:19	6.5	VIII	10.0 km (6.2 mi)	0 km (0 mi) NW of Bulatukan	

== Major earthquakes ==
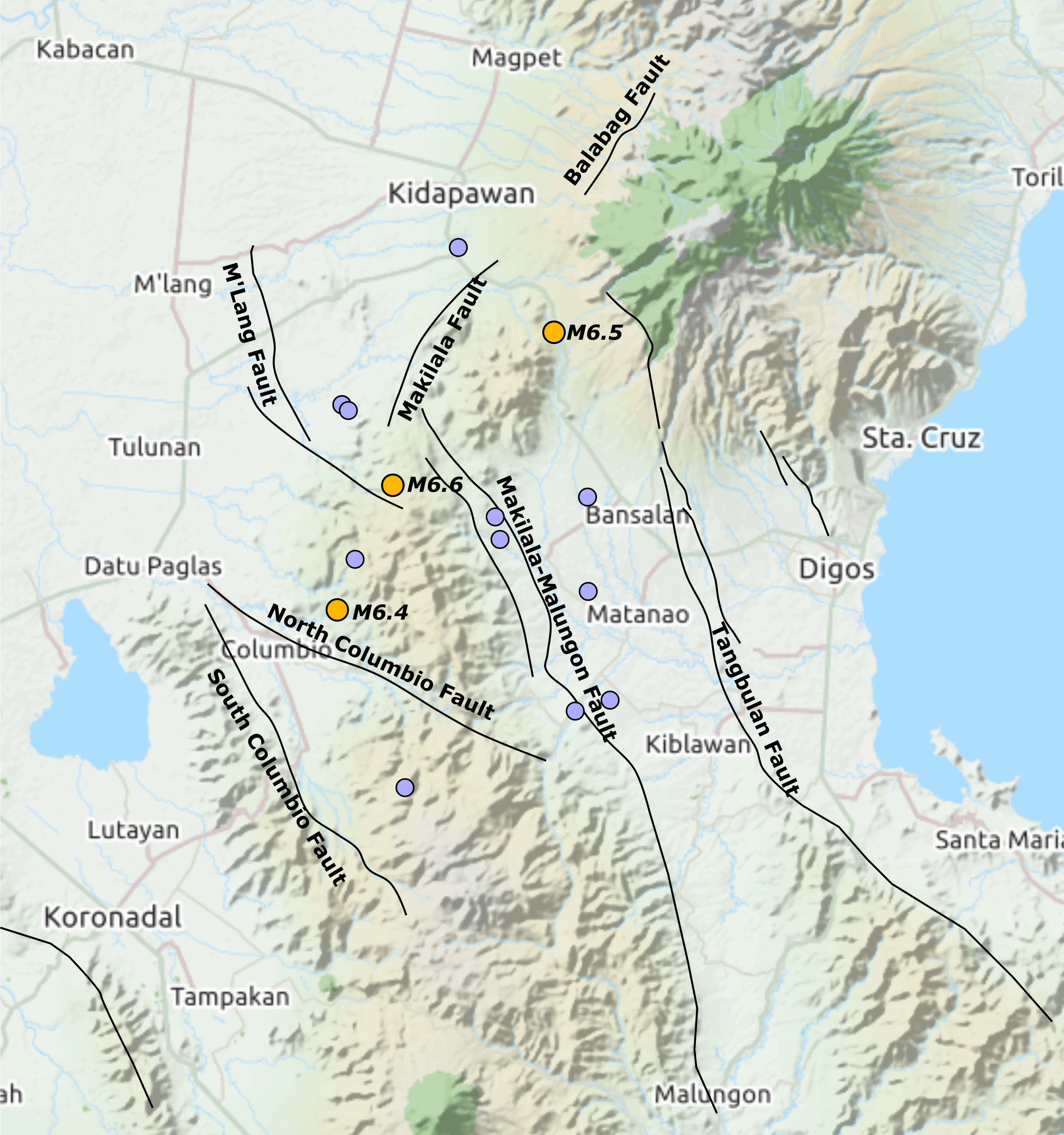
Map of the M≥5 earthquakes from the October 2019 sequence, highlighting the three largest. The location of the main active faults are also shown

USGS ShakeMaps of the 2019 Cotabato earthquakes

October 16 earthquake

October 29 earthquake

October 31 earthquake

=== October 16 ===
The Philippine Institute of Volcanology and Seismology (PHIVOLCS) reported that an earthquake of 6.3 magnitude was recorded at 19:37 PST (UTC+8) with a depth of 10.0 km kilometers (recorded as 6.4 M_{w} at a depth of 12.8 km by the USGS). The epicenter was 7 kilometers ENE of Columbio, 22 kilometers southeast of Tulunan, Cotabato where the earthquake was felt at Intensity VII. VII was also reached at M'lang and Kidapawan. Intensity VI was reached at Tacurong, Santo Niño in South Cotabato, and Digos in Davao del Sur. The earthquake was a result of sinistral movement on a NW-SE trending strike-slip fault.

Magnitude 6.3
PEIS REPORTED INTENSITIES
Intensity	Location
PEIS VII (Destructive)	Tulunan, M'lang, Makilala and Kidapawan, Cotabato
PEIS VI (Very strong)	Digos, Davao del Sur; Santo Nino, South Cotabato; Tacurong, Sultan Kudarat
PEIS V (Strong)	President Roxas and Pikit, Cotabato; Koronadal, Lake Sebu, Polomolok, Tampakan and Tupi, South Cotabato; General Santos; Alabel and Malungon, Sarangani; Davao City; Kalamansig, Lebak and Palimbang, Sultan Kudarat
PEIS IV (Moderately strong)	Kiamba, Sarangani; Esperanza and Rosario, Agusan del Sur; Kalilangan, Quezon, Kadingilan and Damulog, Bukidnon; Mawab, Compostela Valley; Cotabato City; Matanog, Barira, and Sultan Kudarat, Maguindanao
PEIS III (Weak)	Santa Josefa, Agusan del Sur; Iligan; Dipolog; Cagayan de Oro; Gingoog, Misamis Oriental;
PEIS II (Slightly felt)	Butuan; Zamboanga City
PEIS I (Scarcely perceptible)	Hinatuan, Surigao del Sur

Philippine government seismologist Renato Solidum Jr. described the quake as "moderately powerful". The National Tsunami Center issues a statement saying no present tsunami threat from the earthquake.

Three malls in Davao City reported damage following the earthquake. In General Santos, the Gaisano Mall was mostly gutted following a fire triggered by the earthquake. 143 buildings were damaged and one was destroyed. The damaged buildings included 40 houses, 70 schools, 7 health facilities, 10 commercial buildings, and 2 places of worship.

=== October 29 ===
On October 29, a 6.6-magnitude earthquake struck Mindanao at a depth of 14.0 km, according to the USGS, and 7 km according to PHIVOLCS. The maximum perceived shaking was VII on both the PEIS and MMS scales. This intensity was reached in Tulunan, Makilala, Kidapawan City, Digos, and Malungon. This earthquake was caused by movement on a different, but related, strike-slip fault to the October 16 event.

Magnitude 6.6

PEIS REPORTED INTENSITIES
Intensity	Location
PEIS VII (Destructive)	Tulunan and Makilala, Cotabato; Kidapawan City; Digos, Bansalan, Magsaysay, Davao del Sur and Malungon, Sarangani
PEIS VI (Very strong)	Koronadal City and Davao City
PEIS V (Strong)	Cotabato City; Tampakan, Surallah, Banga and Tupi, South Cotabato; General Santos; Magpet, Cotabato; Tacurong City, Kalamansig, Bagumbayan, Sultan Kudarat; Alabel, Sarangani; Kalilangan and Damulog, Bukidnon; Tagum City, Davao del Norte
PEIS IV (Moderately strong)	Cagayan De Oro City; Talakag, Manolo Fortich and Libona, Bukidnon; Glan, Maitum, Maasim and Kiamba, Sarangani; Butuan City; Iligan City; Tubod and Bacolod, Lanao del Norte
PEIS III (Weak)	Molave, Zamboanga del Sur; Dipolog City, Sergio Osmeņa Sr. and Polanco, Zamboanga del Norte; Zamboanga City; Gingoog City, Misamis Oriental and Bislig City
PEIS II (Slightly felt)	Kabasalan, Zamboanga Sibugay, Mambajao, Camiguin and Isabela City, Basilan
PEIS I (Scarcely perceptible)	Palo, Leyte; Dipolog City and Bislig City

A major fire broke out in General Santos. There were power outages in many parts of Cotabato and locally in South Cotabato, Sultan Kudarat, and Sarangani. At least ten deaths were reported, with a minimum of another four hundred injured. The fatalities were reported in Arakan, Carmen, Tulunan, Makilala, Digos, and Magsaysay. School classes were suspended in parts of North Cotabato, South Cotabato, and Sultan Kudarat.

=== October 31 ===
On October 31, a 6.5 magnitude earthquake struck Mindanao at a depth of 10 km according to the USGS, with the epicenter located 1 km south of Kisante. A maximum perceived shaking of VII (PEIS) was reported from Tulunan, Makilala, Kidapawan City, Santa Cruz, Matanao, Magsaysay, Bansalan and Digos. Some buildings in Davao and Soccksargen were seriously damaged and some collapsed. The death toll of these two quakes (October 29 and 31) was raised to 24, with 563 people injured, and 11 still missing. More than 300 aftershocks were recorded after the earthquake.

Magnitude 6.5

PEIS REPORTED INTENSITIES
Intensity	Location
PEIS VII (Destructive)	Tulunan and Makilala, Cotabato; Kidapawan; Matanao, Bansalan, Magsaysay and Santa Cruz, Davao del Sur; Digos
PEIS VI (Very strong)	Davao City; Hagonoy, Davao del Sur
PEIS V (Strong)	Polomolok, Tampakan, Tupi, Surallah and Sto Nino, South Cotabato; Isulan, Sultan Kudarat; Malungon, Sarangani; Koronadal; General Santos
PEIS IV (Moderately strong)	Lake Sebu, South Cotabato; Lebak, Kalamansig, Pigcawayan and Esperanza, Sultan Kudarat; Kalilangan, Damulog, Kadingilan and Talakag, Bukidnon; Alabel, Malampatan and Kiamba, Sarangani; Tacurong
PEIS III (Weak)	Banga, South Cotabato; Lambayon, Sultan Kudarat; Baungon, Manolo Fortich, Don Carlos, Maramag, Quezon, Libona, Valencia and Malaybalay, Bukidnon; Tubod and Kauswagan, Lanao Del Norte; Naawan, Misamis Oriental; El Salvador; Gingoog; Cagayan de Oro; Butuan; Bislig
PEIS II (Slightly felt)	Sindangan and Polanco, Zamboanga del Norte; Las Nieves, Agusan del Sur; Dapitan; Dipolog
PEIS I (Scarcely perceptible)	Zamboanga City

A hotel in Kidapawan City collapsed following the earthquake; according to the National Disaster Risk Reduction and Management Council (NDRRMC), no one was inside when the earthquake struck. The Davao City government suspended the classes on all levels. Affected residents in Makilala, Cotabato were seen begging on the highway for basic needs such as rice and tents. According to the NDRRMC, about 30,000 families or 150,000 individuals were affected by the earthquake.

=== December 15 ===
The Cotabato sequence was followed by an earthquake, with a magnitude of M_{w} 6.8 (ANSS) or M_{s} 6.9 (PHIVOLCS), on December 15 at 14:11 PST with an epicenter in the neighboring province of Davao del Sur. It had a hypocentral depth of between 18 km (ANSS) and 9.0 km (PHIVOLCS) and a maximum felt intensity of VII MMI or VII PEIS. The greatest damage was reported from the towns of Matanao, Magsaysay, Hagonoy and Padada. The earthquake caused 13 deaths and a further 210 people were injured.

=== Analysis using InSAR data ===
The sequence of four earthquakes has examined using Interferometric synthetic aperture radar (InSAR). One study used information only from Sentinel-1, while the other also included information from ALOS-2. InSAR interferograms can be used to detect and quantify ground deformation associated with an earthquake, allowing the location and orientation of fault ruptures, epicenters and slip distributions to be estimated. For the second and third earthquakes in the sequence no information was recorded by either of the satellites between the events, so these events had to be analysed together. Sufficient data were available to allow the other two earthquakes to be analysed separately.

The two studies give similar results, confirming that the first and last major earthquakes in the sequence were caused by rupture along NW-SE trending left-lateral strike-slip faults, while the second and third resulted from rupture along SW-NE trending right-lateral strike-slip faults nearly orthogonal to the other two. One of the studies matched the four interpreted ruptures to known faults. The first event is interpreted to have ruptured the M'lang Fault, the second the Makilala Fault, the third the Balabag Fault and the last the Makilala-Malungon Fault. The observed sequence of earthquakes rupturing orthogonal strike-slip fault sets has been compared to the 2019 Ridgecrest earthquake sequence.

== Landslides ==
The earthquake sequence triggered a large number of landslides and rockslides. Municipalities affected by landslides include Kidapawan City, Antipas, Arakan, Makilala, M'Lang and Tulunan in Cotabato province; Magsaysay, Bansalan, Malalag, Matanao and Kiblawan in Davao Del Sur. Three fatalities were caused by landslides triggered by the October 29 shock with a further six people reported missing. Two fatalities were caused by landslides triggered by the October 31 shock, with a further five people reported missing.

== Effects on infrastructure ==
Damage to infrastructure in the eight most badly affected areas from the earthquakes on October 29 and 31
Province	Houses		Schools		Health facilities		Other public structures		Places of worship		Commercial buildings		Roads & Bridges	
Province	Destroyed	Damaged	Destroyed	Damaged	Destroyed	Damaged	Destroyed	Damaged	Destroyed	Damaged	Destroyed	Damaged	Destroyed	Damaged
North Cotabato	21,120	7,915	20	505	21	76	25	41	5	14	9	24	0	15
Davao del Sur	2,185	7,505	2	260	27	129	3	2	0	0	1	12	0	9
Sultan Kudarat	14	24	0	132	0	1	0	2	0	0	0	0	0	0
Davao Occidental	1	20	1	3	1	4	0	4	0	0	0	4	0	0
Maguindanao	0	20	0	29	0	0	0	2	0	4	0	0	0	0
South Cotabato	1	17	0	223	0	2	0	3	0	0	0	5	0	2
Davao del Norte	0	0	0	113	0	2	0	15	0	1	0	1	0	1
Sarangani	0	0	13	98	0	0	0	1	0	0	0	1	0	0

== Reactions ==
=== International ===
The US Ambassador to the Philippines, Sung Kim, and the EU delegation to the Philippines both offered their condolences to the Filipino people. Chinese Foreign Minister Wang Yi also sent his message of sympathy to Philippine Foreign Secretary Teodoro Locsin Jr. The Chinese government has donated ¥3 million yuan (roughly equivalent to ₱22 million pesos) to support the disaster relief efforts in Mindanao. Meanwhile, the Spanish Consulate in the Philippines pledged to donate up to 35,000 euros to the International Federation of Red Cross and Red Crescent Societies and 70,000 euros to assist people in water, hygiene and sanitation.

=== Domestic ===
The Provincial Government of South Cotabato, Sarangani and the City of General Santos was one of the first to initiate to help the citizens with blankets, trapal, food and water near the epicenter of the earthquake swarm, most especially in the Municipalities of Makilala, Tulunan, M'lang and City of Kidapawan. Local citizens in Soccsksargen acted in both giving donations in the government processes and privately giving donations across the highway in Makilala, Tulunan and Kidapawan. The Davao City Government also helped the affected areas. The Island Garden City of Samal Government also went to Cotabato Province to give relief goods and drinking water. The Bangsamoro Government also went to the affected areas to give relief goods. The municipal government of Datu Saudi Ampatuan also went to the area to share donations to help the affected people. Among other institutions that immediately helped where banks, malls, universities and schools in Soccsksargen and Davao Region to assist their fellow Mindanaoans in crisis.

== See also ==
- List of earthquakes in 2019
- List of earthquakes in the Philippines
- 2019 Luzon earthquake
- 2019 Eastern Samar earthquake
