= List of earthquakes in the Philippines =

Earthquakes in the Philippines
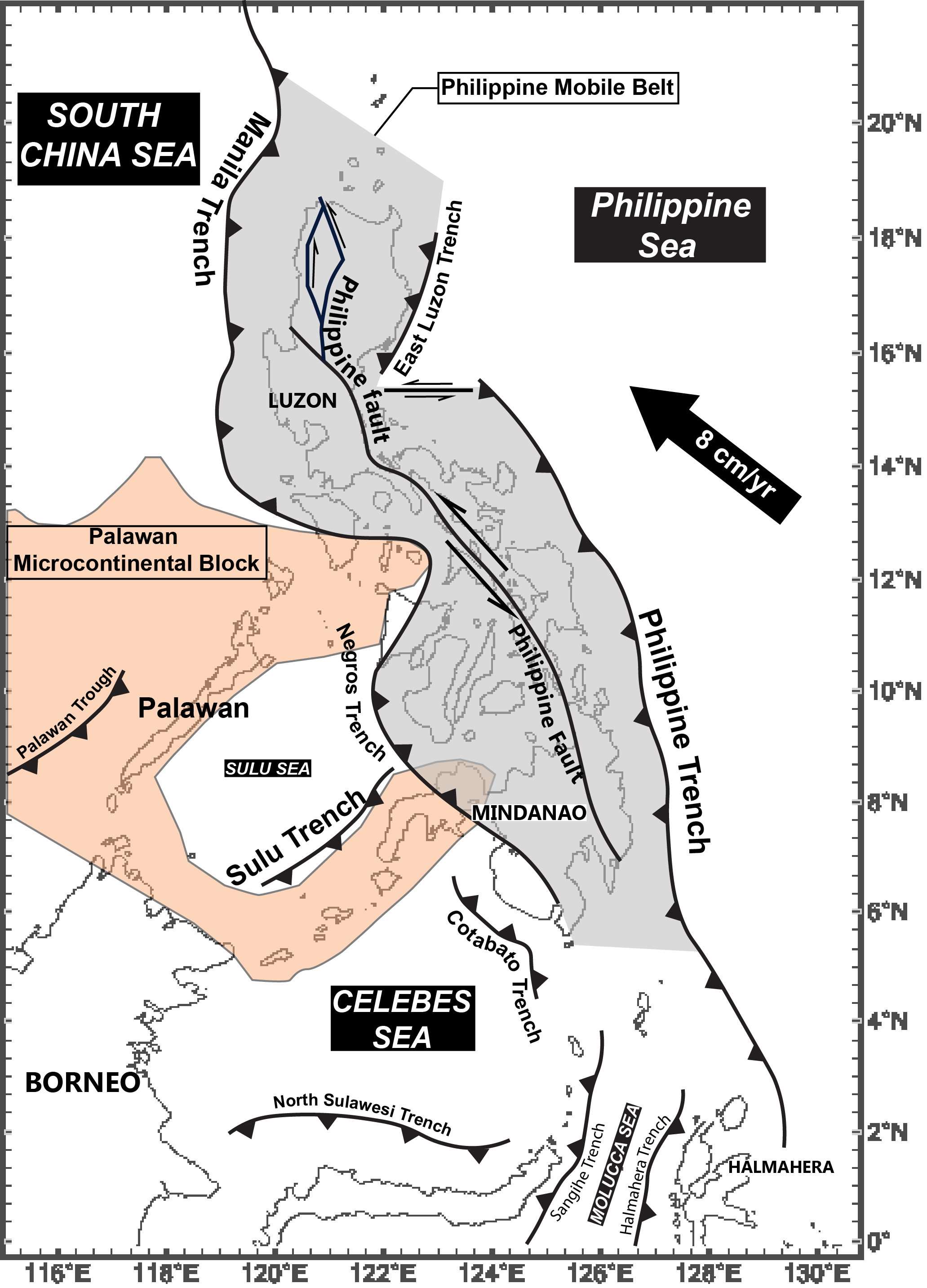
- Tectonic map of the Philippines
- Largest: M_{w} 8.3 1918 Celebes Sea earthquake
- Deadliest: M_{w} 8.0 1976 Moro Gulf earthquake 5,000–8,000 killed

The Philippines lies within the zone of complex interaction between several tectonic plates, involving multiple subduction zones and one large zone of strike-slip, all of which are associated with major earthquakes. Many intraplate earthquakes of smaller magnitude also occur very regularly due to the interaction between the major tectonic plates in the region. The largest historical earthquake in the Philippines was the 1918 Celebes Sea earthquake with a magnitude of M_{w} 8.3.

== Tectonic setting ==
Much of the Philippines lie within the area of strongly tectonised blocks of mainly island arc origin, known as the Philippine Mobile Belt. To the east, the Philippine Sea plate is subducting beneath the mobile belt along the line of the Philippine Trench and the East Luzon Trench at the northern end of the belt. The convergence across this boundary is strongly oblique and the strike-slip component is accommodated by movement on the left lateral Philippine fault system. To the south of the Philippines lies the Molucca Sea Collision Zone, which involves opposite facing subduction zones to either side of the Molucca Sea plate. To the west of the mobile belt the Sunda plate is subducting eastwards beneath the belt along the lines of the Manila, Negros and Cotabato trenches. Within the Sunda plate, the oceanic crust of the Sulu Sea is subducting beneath the Sulu Ridge along the Sulu Trench. The Sunda plate carries with it parts of the Palawan Microcontinental Block, which has collided with the mobile belt at the Negros and Cotabato trenches.

The continuing movement of the tectonic plates leads to active faulting within the mobile belt, such as on the left lateral Cotabato Fault System that cuts across Mindanao and the right lateral Marikina Valley fault system on Luzon.

== Earthquakes ==
This list includes earthquakes in the Philippines with a magnitude of 6.0 or higher, unless a lower-magnitude earthquake resulted in significant damage and/or casualties. Maximum intensities shown in this list before 1910 are on the ten point Rossi-Forel scale, later intensities use the similar ten point PHIVOLCS Earthquake Intensity Scale (PEIS), with those for older post-1910 events converted from values on the Modified Mercalli scale.

=== Spanish period (pre-1900) ===
Date	Time‡	Region(s)	Magnitude	Intensity	Casualties	Notes	Sources
1601 January 16	16:00	Metro Manila, Calabarzon, and Central Luzon		VIII	Several	Earthquake duration lasted about 7 minutes. Aftershocks experienced the whole year.	
1636 December 12		Zamboanga Peninsula		IX		Large-scale landslides are reported to have occurred at Point Flechas which is between the Moro Gulf's large bays of Illana and Sibuguey.	
1645 November 30	20:00	Central Luzon, Cagayan Valley, Cordillera, Ilocos Region, Calabarzon, Metro Manila, and Mimaropa	7.5	X	600 dead, 3,000 injured	Dubbed as the "most terrible earthquake" in the annals of the Philippines. Greatly damaged ten newly constructed cathedrals in Manila, residential villas and buildings in the city and nearby provinces. Provinces in the north reported several alteration of the ground, disappearances of small villages, changes in the river course, sand eruptions, etc. Small tsunamis were reported in southern Luzon.	
1645 December 5	23:00	Central Luzon, Calabarzon, and Metro Manila		VIII		Major aftershock of the November 30, 1645 Luzon earthquake that further destroyed remaining buildings in Manila and nearby towns. Aftershocks ceased around March 1646.	
1665 June 19		Metro Manila, Calabarzon, and Mimaropa		VIII	19	Areas with significant damage are Batangas and Mindoro. Only the Jesuit Church in Manila experienced great damage.	
1743 January 12	08:00	Calabarzon		IX	5 deaths	Destructive in Tayabas Province (now Quezon), wrecking masonry structures in the town of Tayabas and others.	
1787 July 13	07:00	Western Visayas		X	Many	Known as the "1787 Panay Earthquake". Many deaths are unrecorded, but there were 15 deaths reported in one building.	
1840 March 22		Bicol Region	6.5	IX	17 deaths, 200 injured	Numerous masonry buildings, churches and homes were destroyed across Sorsogon, Albay and Masbate	
1852 September 16	18:45	Central Luzon, Calabarzon, and Metro Manila		IX	3	Several buildings were destroyed, many fissures opened, subsidences and landslides occurred.	
1863 June 3	19:20	Metro Manila, Central Luzon, and Calabarzon	6.5	X	400–1,000 deaths, 2,000+ injuries	1863 Manila earthquake	
1879 July 1	00:50	Caraga, and Northern Mindanao		X		1879 Surigao earthquake	
1880 July 14–25	04:40	Calabarzon, Metro Manila, and Central Luzon		IX	20 dead, 50 injured	1880 Luzon earthquakes	
1892 March 16	20:58	Cordillera, and Ilocos Region		X	2	Stretches from Abra to La Union and Pangasinan.	
1897 September 21	13:15	Zamboanga Peninsula, and Bangsamoro	7.5	IX	13–100+ (second event)	1897 Mindanao earthquakes A pair of large earthquakes off Mindanao	

=== 20th century ===
Date	Time‡	Region(s)	Magnitude	Intensity	Casualties	Notes	Sources
1907 April 18	05:00	Bicol Region, and Calabarzon	7.6	IX	2 dead	Camarines and parts of SE Luzon are the areas most affected by the earthquake.	
1911 July 12		Caraga, Northern Mindanao, and Davao Region	7.8	IX		Caused seiches in lakes and the Agusan River. Many homes damaged in Talacogon and Butuan	
1918 August 15	20:18	Soccsksargen, Bangsamoro, and Davao Region	8.3	IX	46 dead	1918 Celebes Sea earthquake	
1924 April 15	00:20	Davao Region, and Caraga	8.3	VIII	~500		
1925 May 5	18:07	Ilocos Region, Cordillera, and Central Luzon	6.8	VIII	17 dead		
1928 December 19	19:37	Soccsksargen	7.3	VII	93 dead		
1937 August 20	19:59	Calabarzon, Bicol Region, and Metro Manila	7.6	VIII	1 dead, 200 injured		
1948 January 25	01:46	Western Visayas	7.8	IX	72 dead	1948 Lady Caycay earthquake	
1954 July 2	10:45	Bicol Region	6.8	VIII	13 dead, 101 injured		
1955 April 1	02:17	Northern Mindanao, Bangsamoro, and Soccsksargen	7.4	VIII	465 dead, 898 injured	1955 Lanao earthquake	
1968 August 2	04:19	Central Luzon, Cagayan Valley, Calabarzon, and Metro Manila	7.6	VIII	270 dead, 261 injured	1968 Casiguran earthquake	
1970 April 7	13:34	Central Luzon, Metro Manila, Calabarzon, Bicol Region, Cagayan Valley, Cordillera, and Ilocos Region	7.3	VI	15 dead, 200 injured		
1972 December 2	16:30	Davao Region	8.0	VII		Damages to some buildings were reported.	
1973 March 17	16:30	Calabarzon, and Bicol Region	7.4	VIII	15 dead, ~100 injured	1973 Ragay Gulf earthquake	
1976 August 17	00:11	Bangsamoro, Soccsksargen, and Zamboanga Peninsula	8.0	VII	8,000 dead, 10,000 injured	1976 Moro Gulf earthquake	
1983 August 17	20:17	Ilocos Region, Cordillera, and Cagayan Valley	6.5	VIII	16 dead, 47 injured	1983 Luzon earthquake	
1985 April 24		Cordillera	6.1	VII	6 dead, 11 injured	There are significant damages in Baguio City and Benguet.	
1988 June 19	04:19	Mimaropa	6.2	VII	2 dead, 2 injured	1988 Mindoro earthquake	
1990 February 8	15:15	Central Visayas, Northern Mindanao, and Negros Island Region	6.8	VII	6 dead, >200 injured	1990 Bohol Sea earthquake	
1990 June 14	15:41	Western Visayas	7.1	VII	8 dead, 41 injured	1990 Panay earthquake	
1990 July 16	16:26	Cordillera, Ilocos Region, Cagayan Valley, Central Luzon, Metro Manila, and Calabarzon	7.7	VIII	1,621 dead, 3,000 injured	1990 Luzon Earthquake	
1994 November 14	03:15	Mimaropa, and Calabarzon	7.1	VII	81 dead, 225 injured	1994 Mindoro earthquake	
1999 December 12	02:03	Central Luzon, Ilocos Norte, and Metro Manila	7.3	VII	6 dead, 40 injured	1999 Luzon earthquake	

=== 21st century ===
Date	Time‡	Region(s)	Magnitude	Intensity	Casualties	Notes	Sources
2001 January 1	14:57	Davao Region	7.5	VII		Only minor damage to infrastructure was reported.	
2002 March 6	05:16	Soccsksargen, Bangsamoro, and Davao Region	7.5	IX	15 dead, 100+ injured	2002 Mindanao earthquake	
2003 November 19	01:14	Eastern Visayas	6.5	VII	1 dead, 21 injured	The epicenter is located in the province of Samar.	
2010 July 24		Bangsamoro, Soccsksargen	7.3, 7.6, 7.5	IV		2010 Mindanao earthquakes triplet earthquake, deep focus events	
2012 February 6	11:49	Negros Island	6.7	VII	113 dead, 112 injured	2012 Negros earthquake	
2012 August 31	20:47	Eastern Visayas	7.6	VII	1 dead, 1 injured	2012 Samar earthquake	
2013 October 15	08:12	Central Visayas	7.2	VIII	222 dead, 976 injured	2013 Bohol earthquake	
2017 February 10	22:03	Caraga	6.5	VII	8 dead, 200 injured	2017 Surigao earthquake	
2017 July 6	16:03	Eastern Visayas, and Central Visayas	6.5	VII	4 dead, 100+ injured	2017 Leyte earthquake	
2019 April 22	17:11	Central Luzon, Metro Manila, and Calabarzon	6.1	VII	18 dead, 256 injured	2019 Luzon earthquake	
2019 April 23	13:37	Eastern Visayas	6.5	VI	48 injured	2019 Eastern Samar earthquake	
2019 July 9	20:36	Soccsksargen, and Davao Region	5.6	VI	1 dead, 73 injured	July 2019 Cotabato earthquake	
2019 July 27	07:37	Ilocos Region	6.0	VII	9 dead, 60 injured	2019 Batanes earthquake	
2019 October 16	19:37	Soccsksargen, Bangsamoro	6.4	VII	7 dead, 215 injured	2019 Cotabato earthquakes	
2019 October 29	09:04	Soccsksargen, Davao Region, Bangsamoro, and Caraga	6.6	VII	24 dead, 563 injured	2019 Cotabato earthquakes	
2019 October 31	09:11	Soccsksargen	6.5	VII	24 dead, 563 injured	2019 Cotabato earthquakes	
2019 December 15	14:11	Davao Region, and Soccsksargen	6.8	VII	13 dead, 210 injured	2019 Davao del Sur earthquake	
2020 August 18	08:03	Bicol Region	6.6	VII	2 dead, 170 injured	2020 Masbate earthquake	
2021 August 12	01:46	Davao Region	7.1	V	1 dead	2021 Davao Oriental earthquake	
2022 July 27	08:43	Cordillera, Ilocos Region, Cagayan Valley, and Central Luzon	7.0	VIII	11 dead, 615 injured	2022 Luzon earthquake	
2023 November 17	16:14	Soccsksargen, and Davao Region	6.7	VIII	11 dead, 730 injured	November 2023 Mindanao earthquake	
2023 December 2	22:37	Caraga, and Davao Region	7.6	VII	3 dead, 79 injured	December 2023 Mindanao earthquake	
2025 September 30	21:59	Central Visayas, and Eastern Visayas	6.9	VIII	79 dead, 599 injured	2025 Cebu earthquake	
2025 October 10	09:43	Davao Region, Caraga, Soccsksargen, and Northern Mindanao	7.4	VI	10 dead, 176 injured	2025 Davao Oriental earthquakes	
2025 October 10	19:12	Davao Region	6.7	VI		2025 Davao Oriental earthquakes	
2026 June 8	07:37	Soccsksargen, Davao Region, Bangsamoro, and Zamboanga Peninsula	7.8	VIII	106 dead, 1,316 injured	2026 Mindanao earthquake	

== Deadliest earthquakes ==
Ten deadliest earthquakes since the 1600s
Magnitude		Location	Date	Deaths	Missing	Injured	Damage	Source
1	8.0	Palimbang, Sultan Kudarat	August 17, 1976	4,791	2,288	9,928		
2	7.8	Rizal, Nueva Ecija	July 16, 1990	1,621	1,000	>3,000	₱ 10 billion	
3	6.4	Manila	June 3, 1863	1,000				
4	7.5	Gabaldon, Nueva Ecija	November 30, 1645	600–3,000		>3,000	Unknown	
5	8.3	Mati, Davao Oriental	April 14, 1924	~500				
6	7.4	Lapuyan, Zamboanga del Sur	April 1, 1955	465		Unknown	US$5 million	
7	7.6	Casiguran, Aurora	August 2, 1968	271		261		
8	7.2	Sagbayan, Bohol	October 15, 2013	222	8	796	₱ 4 billion (est.)	
9	6.7	Jimalalud, Negros Oriental	February 6, 2012	113		112	₱ 383 million	
10	7.8	Glan, Sarangani	June 8, 2026	106	7	1,316	₱71 billion	

== Seismicity ==
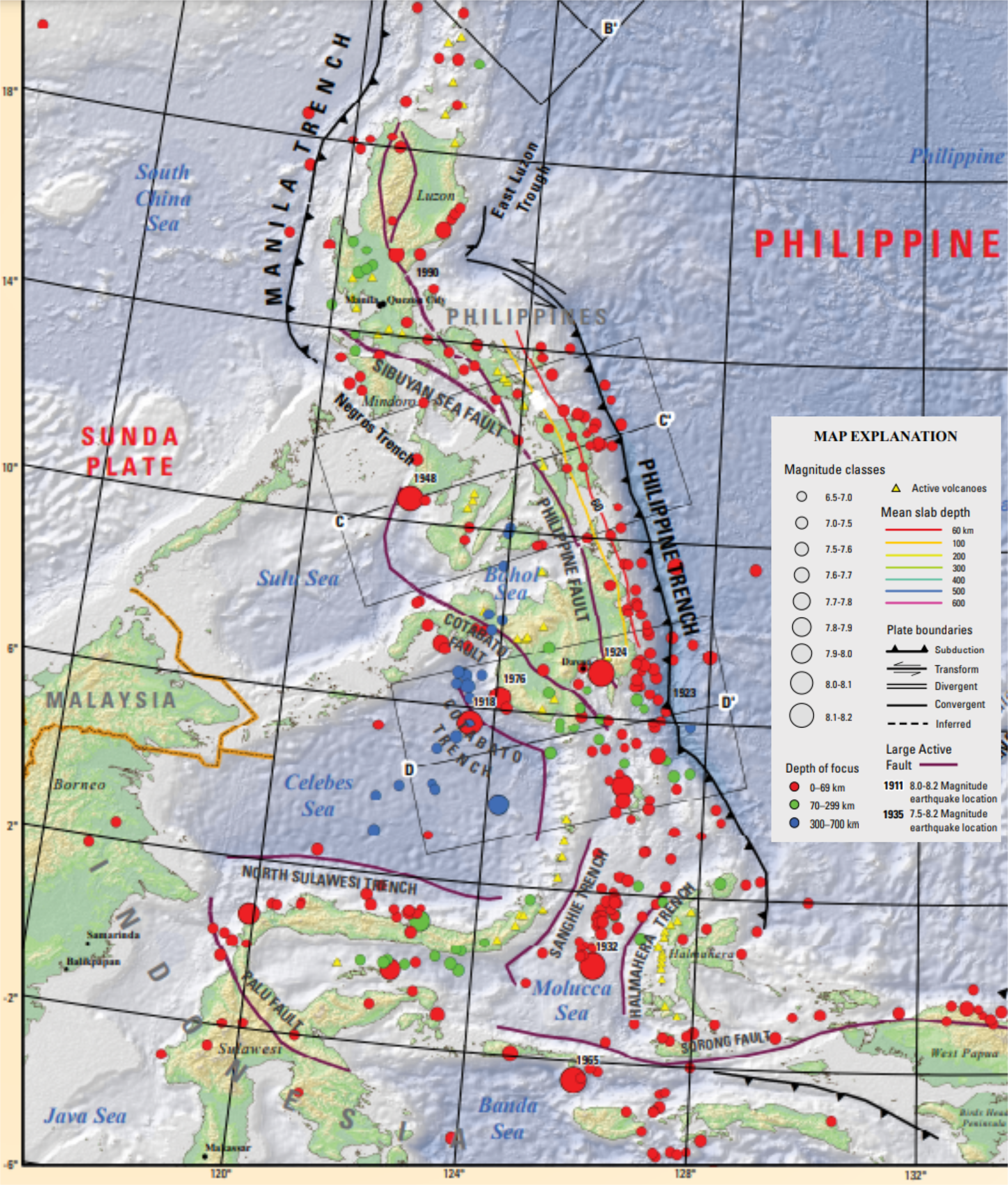
Earthquakes in the Philippines and adjacent areas 1900 to 2012

=== Subduction zones ===
The subduction zones that surround most of the archipelago are the source of many of the larger earthquakes that strike the Philippines. This includes both faulting along the plate interfaces and within the subducting slabs. For the Philippine Trench, an example of plate interface faulting is the 1988 M_{w}7.3 earthquake. The 1975 M_{w}7.6 earthquake was caused by intra-slab normal faulting, while the 2012 M7.6 was a result of thrust faulting within the descending slab.

The relatively young Cotabato Trench subduction zone has been associated with several large megathrust earthquakes, including the 1918 Celebes Sea earthquake (M8.3), the 1976 Moro Gulf earthquake (M8.0) and the 2002 Mindanao earthquake (M7.5).

=== Strike-slip zones ===
The longest and most seismically active of the strike-slip structures is the 1200 km long Philippine Fault Zone. It carries the left lateral component of the oblique convergence at the Philippine Trench, with a current estimated slip-rate of 35 ± 4 mm per year on Leyte, reducing northwards to about 20 mm per year on Luzon. On Luzon, the fault zone splays out into a number of different faults, including the Digdig Fault. One of the largest historical earthquake on the fault zone was the 1990 Luzon M_{s} 7.8 event that left nearly 2,000 people dead or missing. The same part of the fault zone is thought to have ruptured in the 1645 Luzon earthquake.

In central Mindanao, the Cotabato fault system consists of a mixture of NW-SE trending left lateral and SW-NE trending right lateral strike-slip faults. Four of these ruptured in the 2019 Cotabato and Davao del Sur earthquakes, each generating events with magnitudes of 6.4 or greater.

== Seismic hazard ==
Given the presence of major fault zones throughout the archipelago, any part of the Philippines may be affected by earthquakes, apart from parts of Palawan, where the seismic hazard risk is comparatively low. The greatest shaking hazard comes from shallow crustal faulting close to the Manila, Davao and Cebu metropolitan areas. Active reverse faults have >20 km wide zones of peak ground acceleration (PGA) >0.6g (acceleration due to gravity) for a 10% probability of exceedance (PoE) in a 50-year period, while active strike-slip faults have narrower zones centered around the fault traces at a similar level. All areas close to active subduction zones show increased hazard.

In Metro Manila the estimated hazard has a mean PGA of 0.32 g for a PoE of 10% in 50 years. The main hazard comes from shallow fault sources, such as the Marikina Valley Fault System, but there is an important contribution to the overall hazard from the Manila subduction zone to the west and the potential for strong shaking from earthquakes originating the Philippines Trench to the east. In Metro Cebu, the mean PGA is also 0.32 g for the same PoE and period. The hazard is dominated by shallow crustal fault zones from this area of ongoing compressional tectonics. Using the same parameters Metro Davao has the higher value of 0.45 g. The metropolitan area sits close to shallow faults of left lateral strike-slip and oblique reverse type, and these generate the greatest hazard, although a significant contribution comes from sources in the Halmahera and Philippine subduction zones.

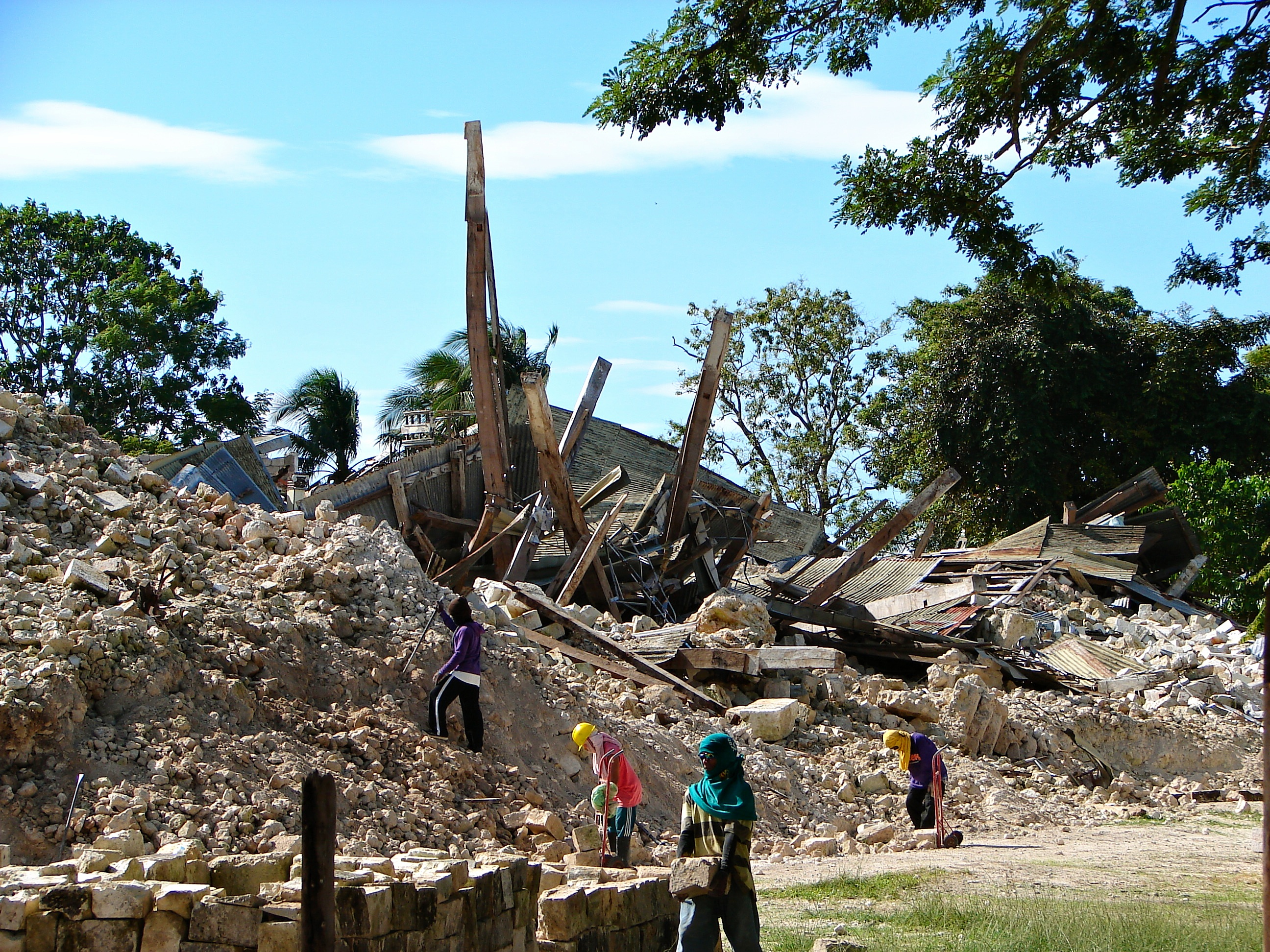

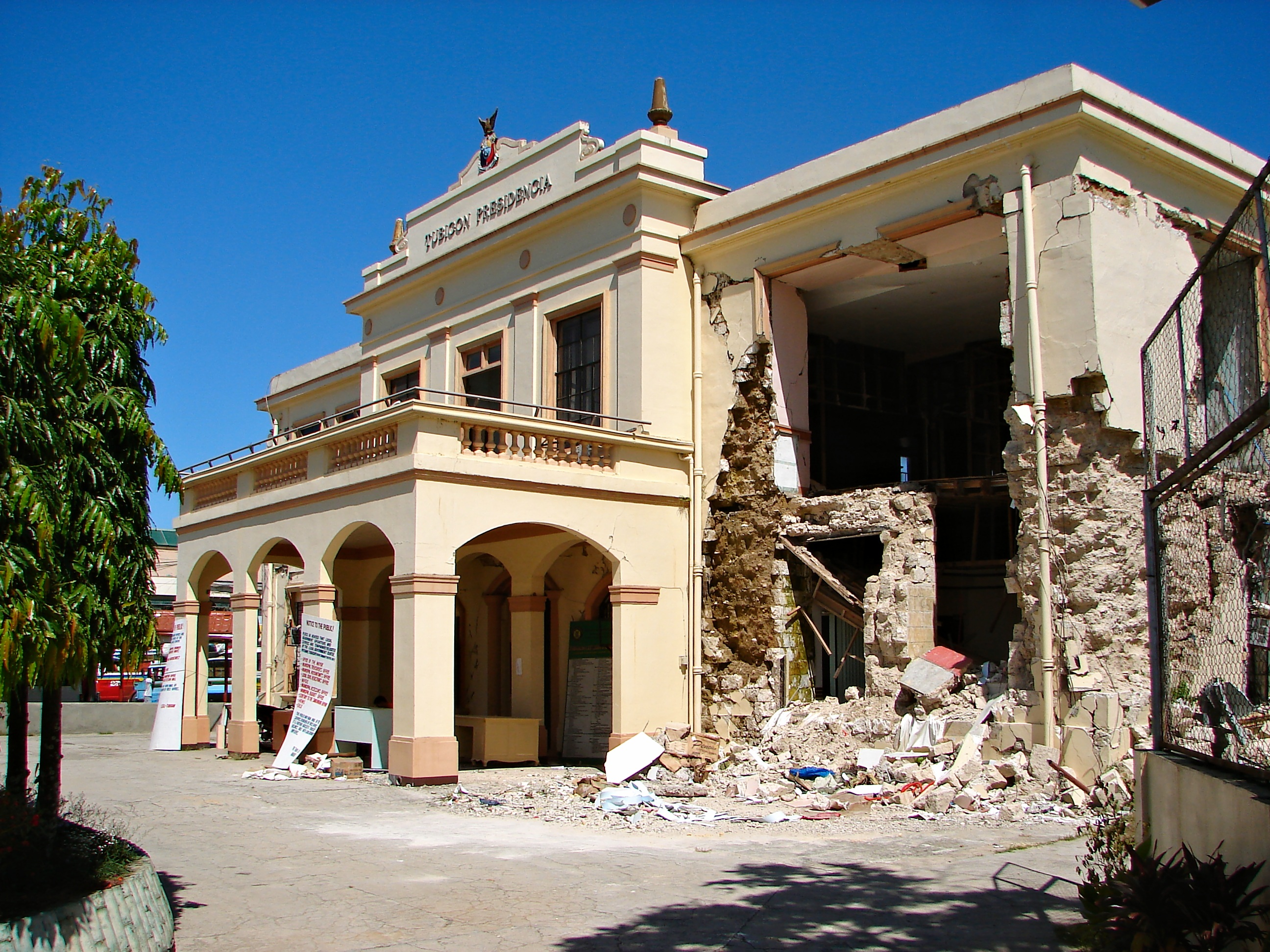

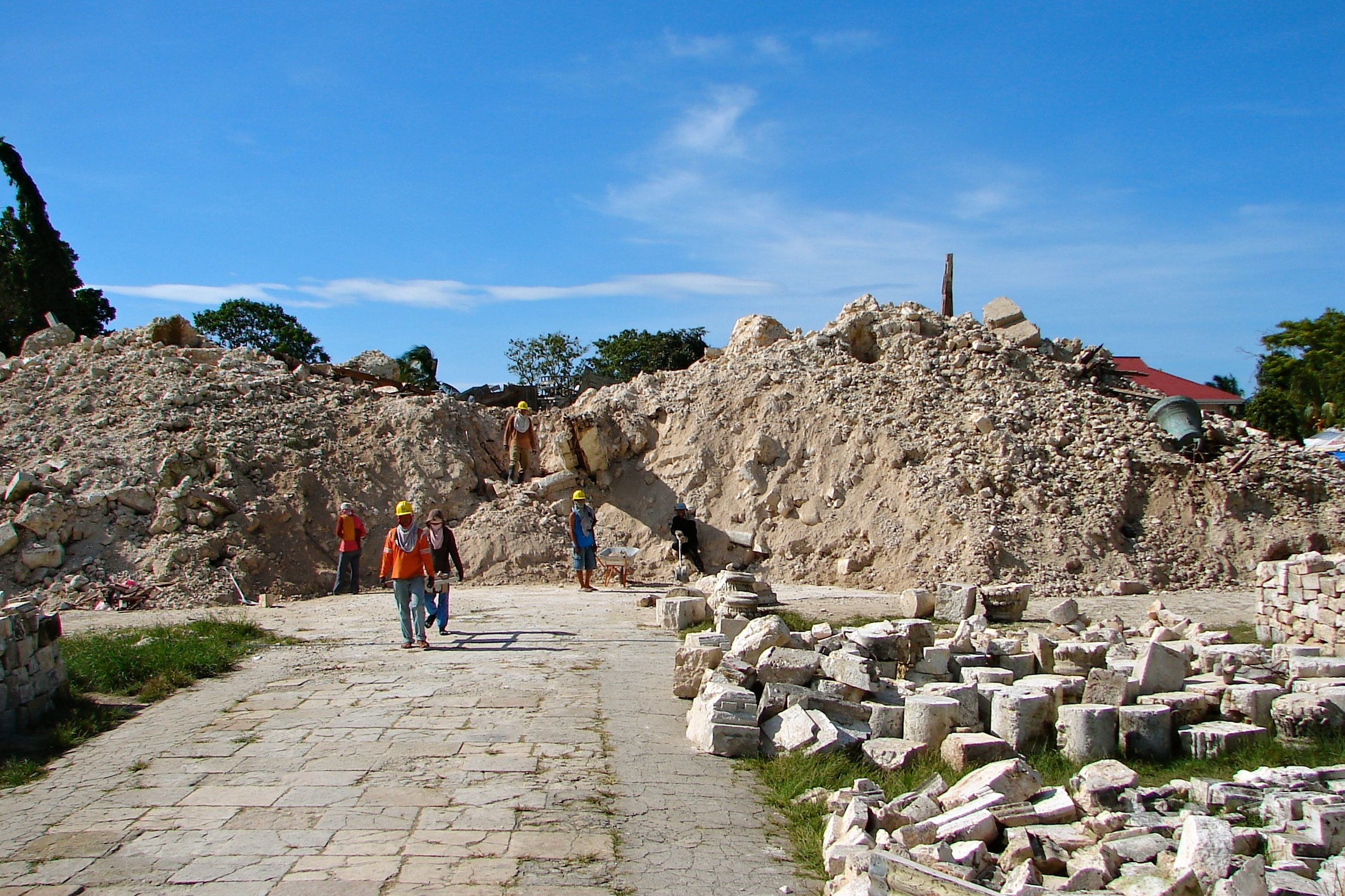

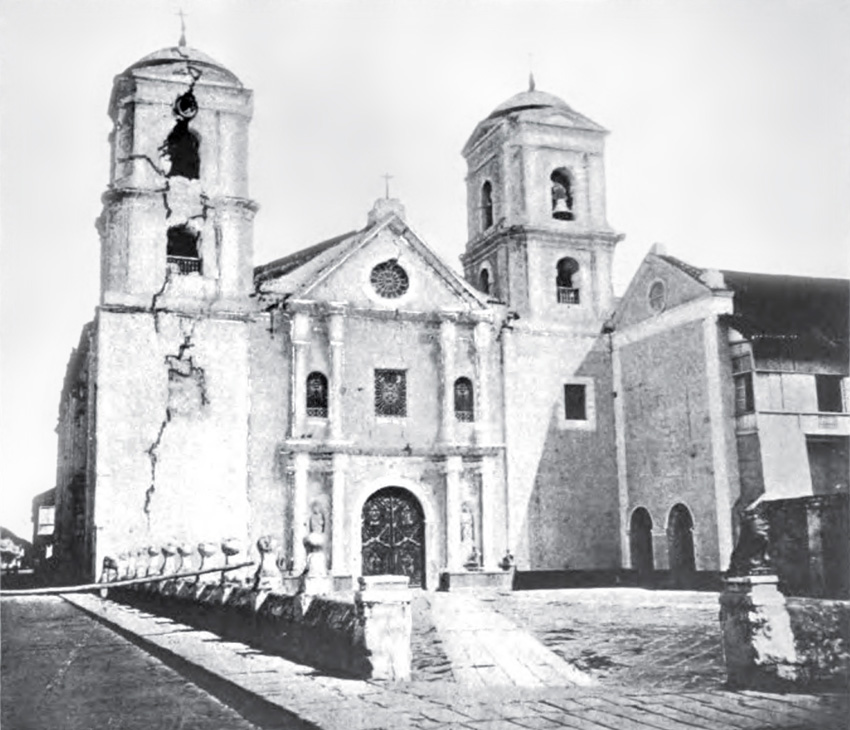

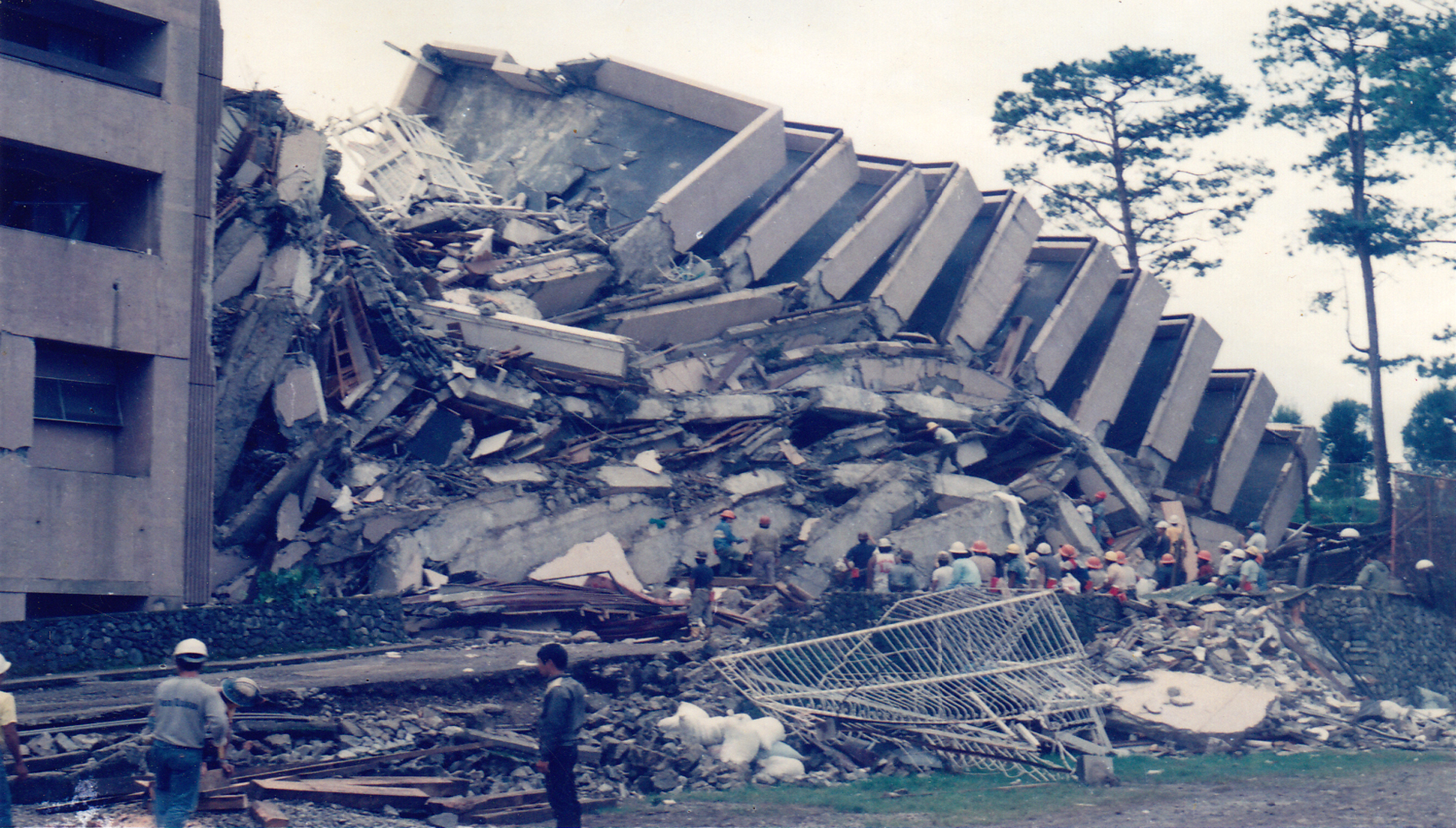

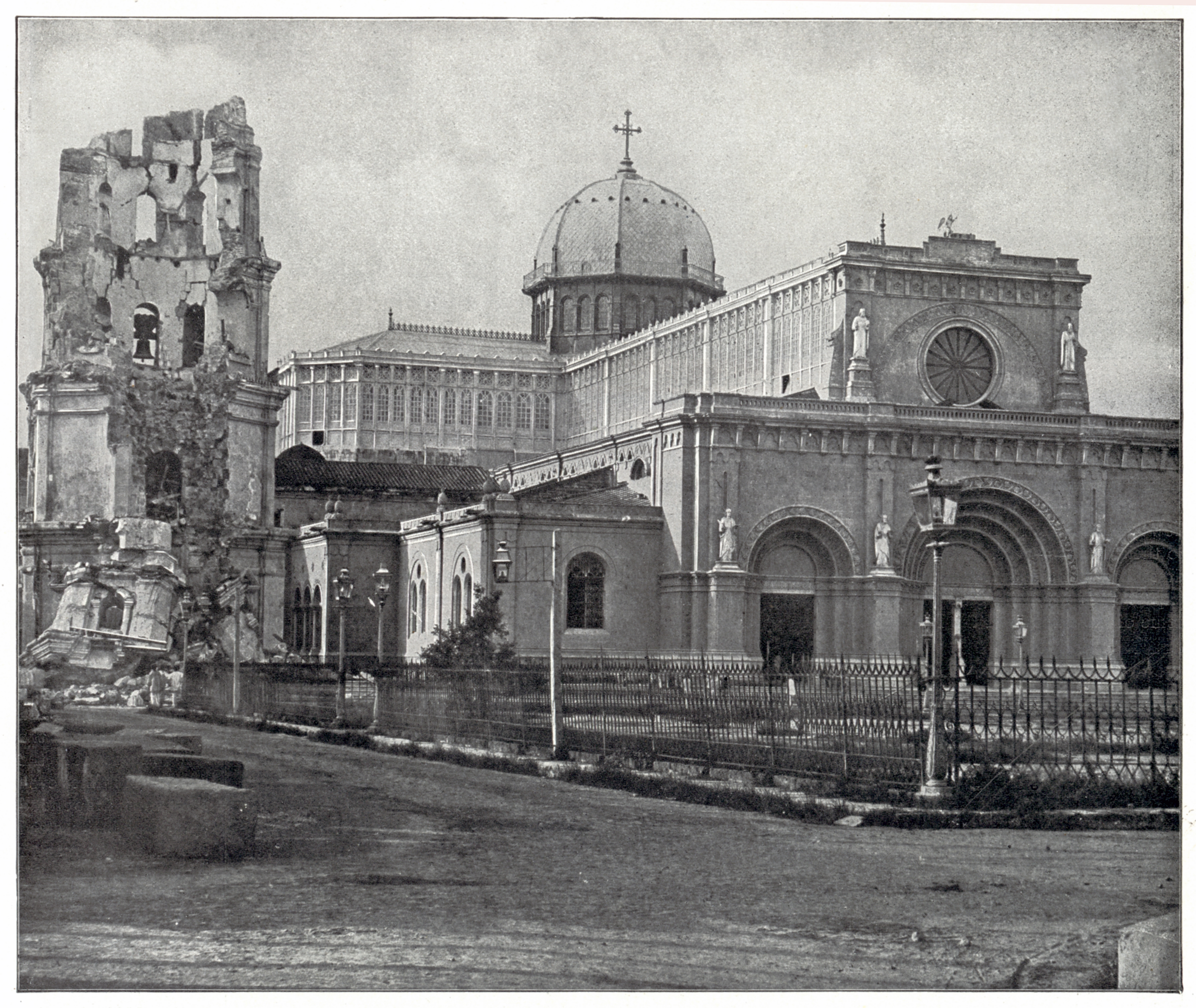

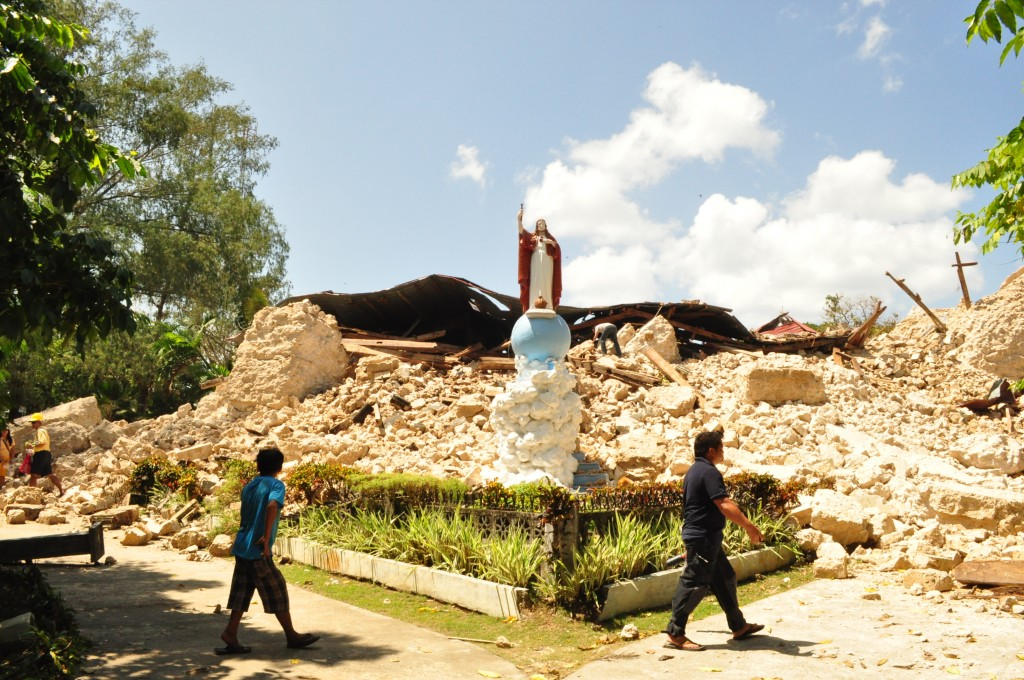

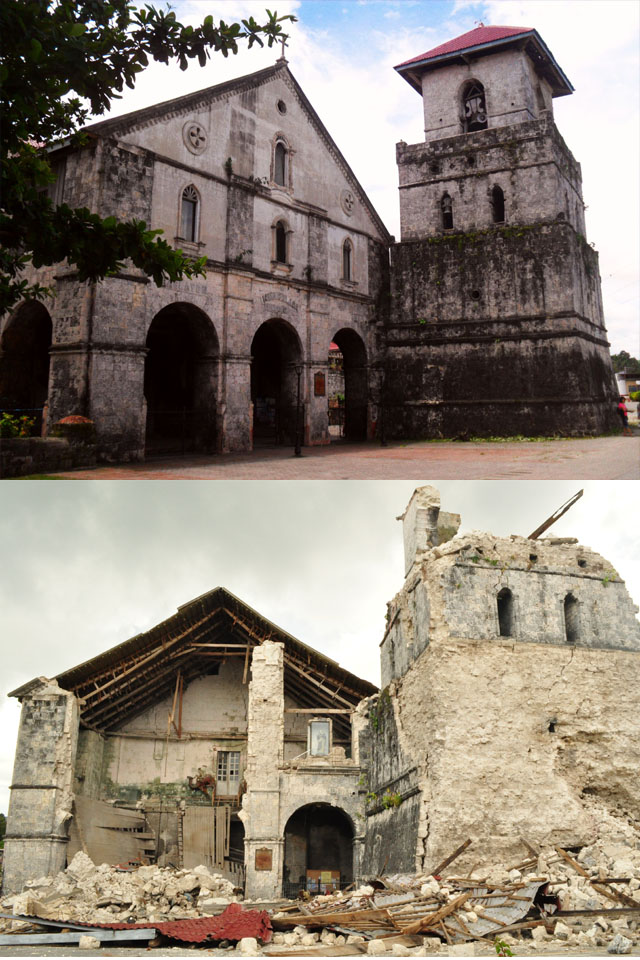

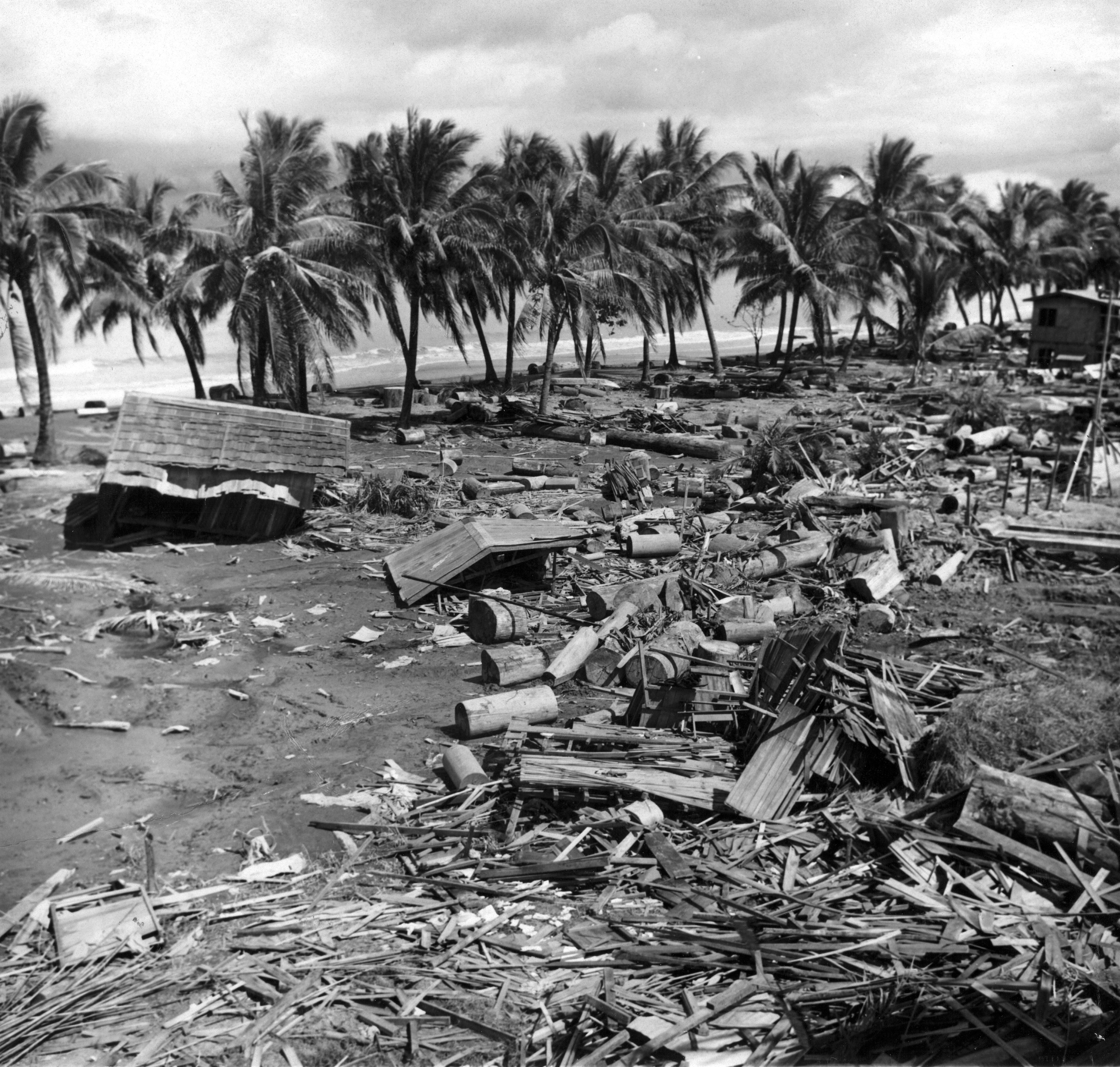

== See also ==
- Subduction tectonics of the Philippines
