= Philippine Institute of Volcanology and Seismology =

Government agency in the Philippines

- Surian ng Pilipinas sa Bulkanolohiya at Sismolohiya

Agency overview
- Formed: September 17, 1982 (43 years ago)
- Preceding agencies: Commission on Volcanology (COMVOL); Philippine Institute of Volcanology (PHIVOLC)
- Jurisdiction: Philippines
- Headquarters: C.P. Garcia Avenue, UP Campus, Diliman, Quezon City; 14°39′6.94″N 121°3′30.68″E
- Employees: 208 (2024)
- Annual budget: ₱1.057 billion (2026)
- Agency executive: Usec. Teresito C. Bacolcol, Director
- Parent agency: Department of Science and Technology
- Website: www.phivolcs.dost.gov.ph

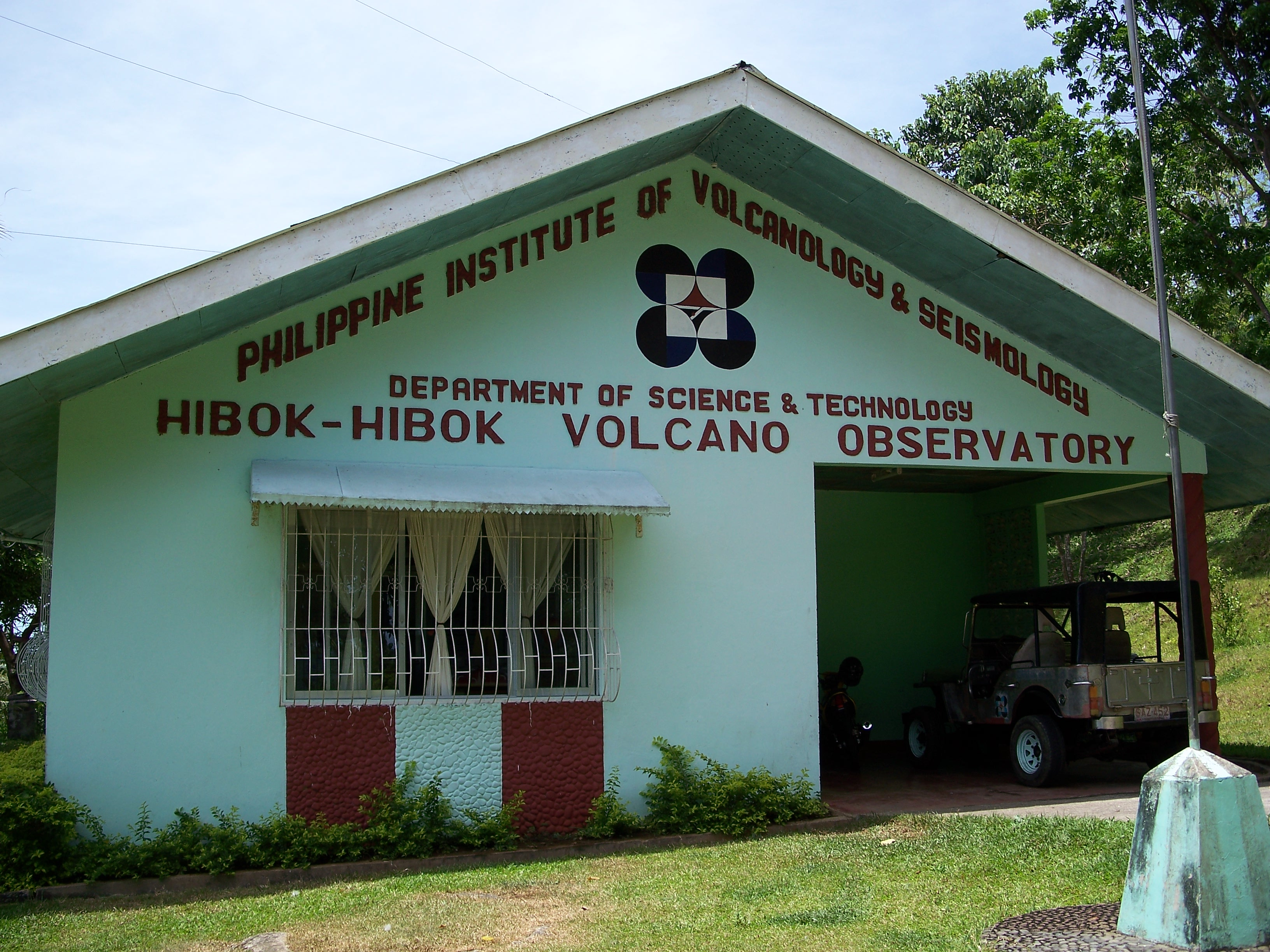
PHIVOLCS Observatory at Mount Hibok-Hibok.

The Philippine Institute of Volcanology and Seismology (PHIVOLCS, Filipino: [ˈfivolks]; Filipino: Surian ng Pilipinas sa Bulkanolohiya at Sismolohiya) is a Philippine national institution dedicated to provide information on the activities of volcanoes, earthquakes, and tsunamis, as well as other specialized information and services primarily for the protection of life and property and in support of economic, productivity, and sustainable development. It is one of the service agencies of the Department of Science and Technology.

PHIVOLCS monitors volcano, earthquake, and tsunami activity, and issues warnings as necessary. It is mandated to mitigate disasters that may arise from such volcanic eruptions, earthquakes, tsunamis, and other related geotectonic phenomena.

== History ==
This government organization was formed after a historical merging of official functions of government institutions.

One of its first predecessors is the Philippine Weather Bureau created in 1901 when meteorological, seismological and terrestrial magnetic services of the Manila Observatory were transferred from the Roman Catholic Church to the American Colonial Government. It performed earthquake monitoring in the country and has inherited and maintained the early earthquake catalogue at that time. By 1972, the Philippine Weather Bureau was reorganized under Presidential Decree No. 78 into the Philippine Atmospheric Geophysical and Astronomical Services Administration (PAGASA). A United Nations Development Programme-funded project for PAGASA established a twelve-station earthquake monitoring network in the country.

In February 1951, Dr. Jose M. Feliciano, Chair of the Division of Physical and Mathematical Sciences of the National Research Council of the Philippines (NRCP) presented a proposal for the creation of a Commission on Volcanology. The eruption of Mount Hibok-Hibok in December 1951 and the consequent destruction and loss of lives led to the closer cooperation by the Geology, Seismology, and Volcanology Section, committee on Volcanology of the Department of Agriculture and Natural Resources, to study volcanoes in the Philippines. This collaboration let to the enactment of Republic Act No. 766 on June 20, 1952, that created the Commission of Volcanology (COMVOL). This Commission was placed under NRCP and its office was initially set up in the College of Liberal Arts in UP Diliman. Under Executive Order No. 784 of March 17, 1982, the umbrella department of COMVOL, the National Science Development Board (NSDB) was reorganized into the National Science and Technology Authority (NSTA), and COMVOL was restructured to become the Philippine Institute of Volcanology or PHIVOLC.

The seismological arm of PAGASA was officially transferred to PHIVOLC on September 17, 1984, through Executive Order No. 984, renaming the institute as the Philippines Institute of Volcanology and Seismology or PHIVOLCS. The NSTA, the umbrella department for PHIVOLCS and PAGASA, became the Department of Science and Technology (DOST) in 1987. The technical staff and the 12-station earthquake monitoring network was fully integrated to PHIVOLCS in 1988.

PHIVOLCS and the United States Geological Survey collaborated during the 1991 eruption of Mount Pinatubo. Their forecast provided the timely evacuation of military personnel and residents that were affected by the eruption.

PHIVOLCS was headed by Raymundo Punongbayan from 1982 to 2002, and it was headed by Renato U. Solidum Jr. from 2003 to 2023.

Dr. Teresito C. Bacolcol was appointed as the new Director and took his oath on January 23, 2023, with Secretary of Science and Technology Dr. Renato Solidum Jr. in Quezon City.

In April 2025, President Bongbong Marcos signed a law measure modernizing the Philippine Institute of Volcanology and Seismology (PHIVOLCS) to improve its technological operational capacity.

== Monitoring ==
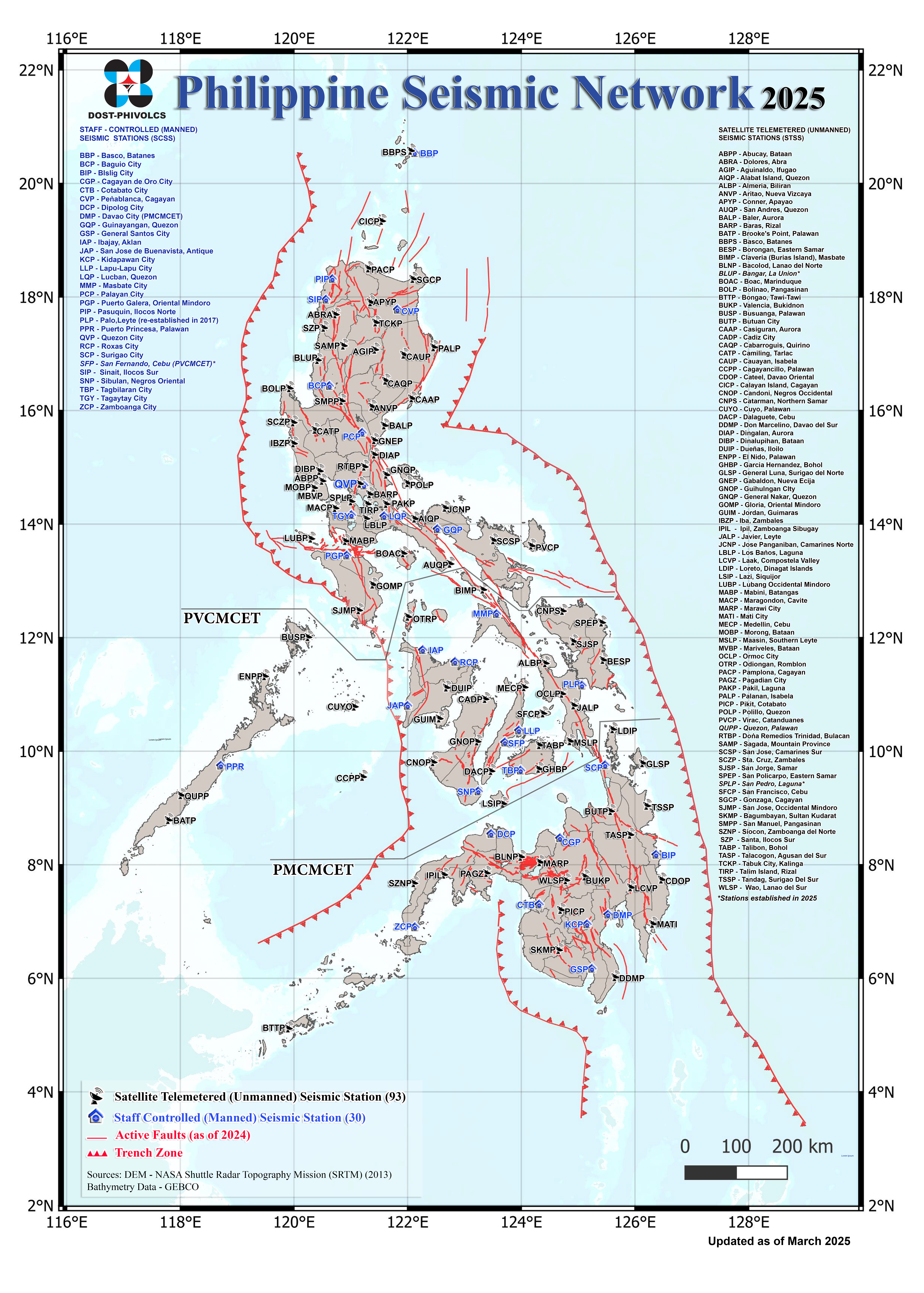
Map of the Philippine Seismic Network (As of 2025)

=== Earthquakes ===
The PHIVOLCS currently operates 129 seismic stations as part of the Philippine Seismic Network (PSN) through the Seismological Observation and Earthquake Prediction Division (SOEPD) in order to monitor earthquakes within the Philippine region, in addition 133 intensity meters are operated throughout the country using the PHIVOLCS earthquake intensity scale. The PSN also has 2 regional cluster monitoring stations separate from the Luzon cluster, PVCMCET (PHIVOLCS Visayas Cluster Monitoring Center for Earthquake and Tsunami) and PMCMCET (PHIVOLCS Mindanao Cluster Monitoring Center for Earthquake and Tsunami), which was established for faster data acquisition and redundancy in case of disruption.

The agency provides earthquake data on its epicenter, magnitude, hypocenter, intensity, and focal mechanism along with the possibility of tsunami occurrence, which is utilized for information dissemination and to formulate appropriate disaster preparedness plans.

=== Volcanoes ===
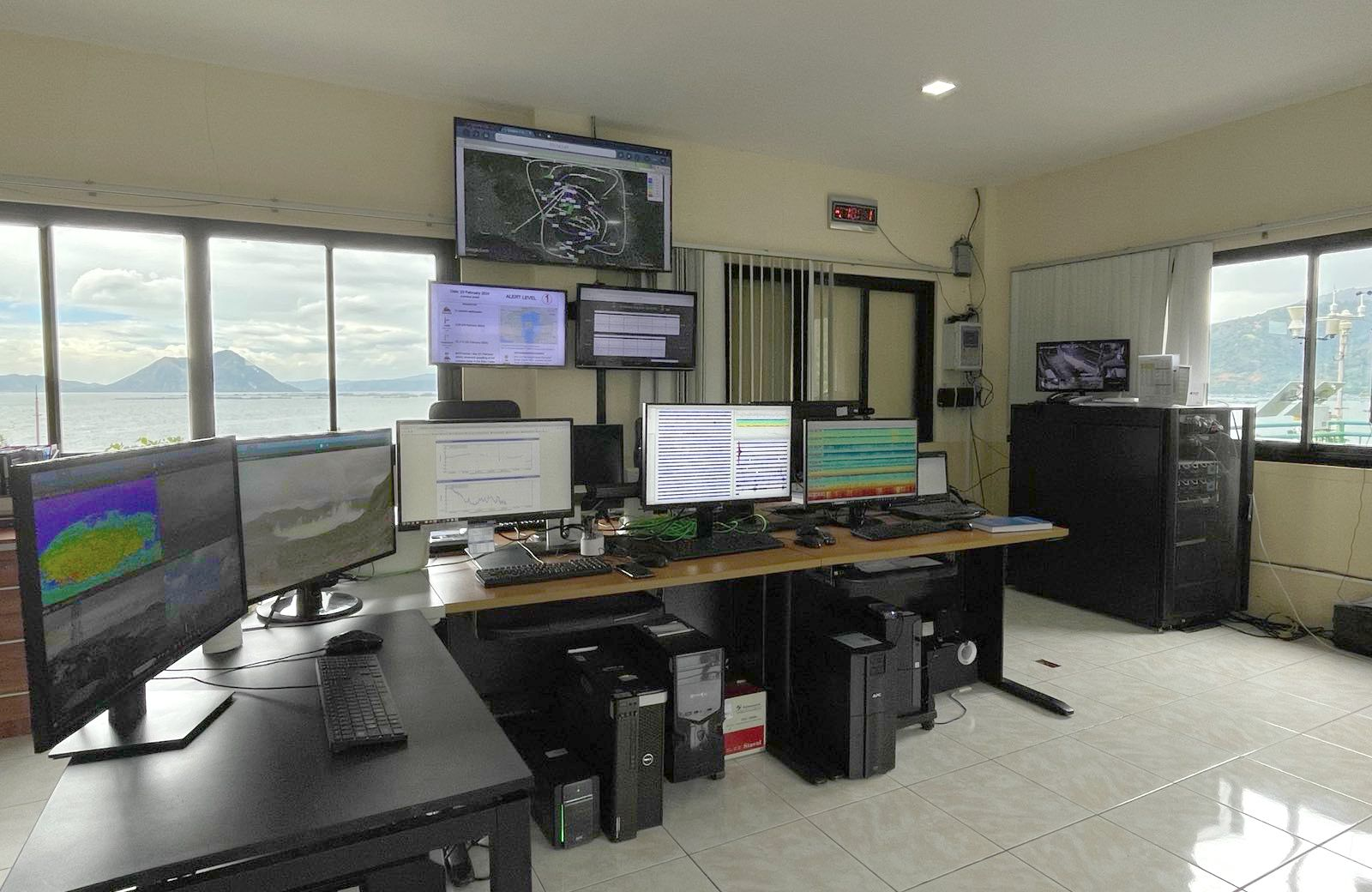
Taal Volcano Observatory’s Data Receiving Center acquires real-time digital multi-parameter volcano monitoring data streams from remote observation stations installed around the Volcano Island and Taal Caldera.

PHIVOLCS operates 6 volcano observatories under 24-hour monitoring through the Volcano Monitoring and Eruption Prediction Division (VMEPD). The VMEPD operates a collection of seismometers, electronic tiltmeters, GPS stations, IP cameras, Infrared cameras, and SO₂ monitoring stations to monitor precise changes in activity to which data may be transmitted to the PHIVOLCS headquarters or one of the volcano observatories at their respective monitoring domains.

== Research and Development ==
The Geology and Geophysics Research and Development Division (GGRD) of the PHIVOLCS is mandated for the study of Geological and Geophysical phenomena and other earth sciences. The division consists of various laboratories for the purpose of research and development, furthermore the division creates hazard maps and earthquake scenarios for cities and provinces all throughout the Philippines.

== Classification of volcanoes in the Philippines ==
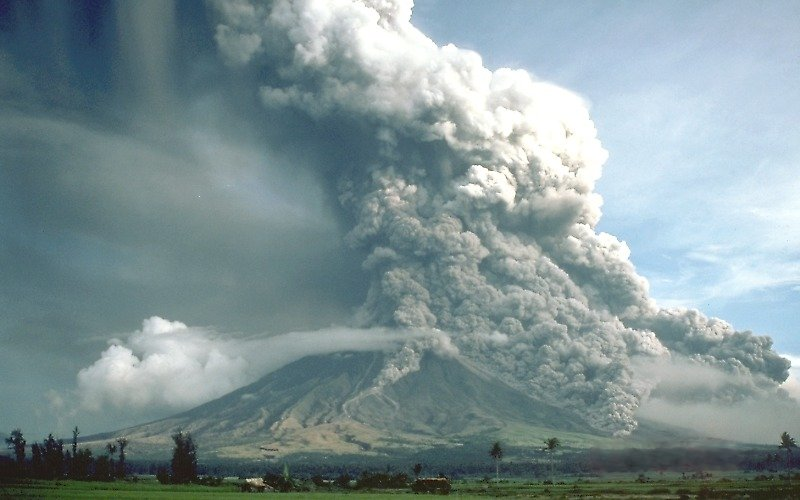
In 1984, pyroclastic flows descend the south-eastern flank of Mayon Volcano, the most active volcano in the Philippines

PHIVOLCS classifies volcanoes as active, potentially active, or inactive:

=== Active ===
- Eruption in historic times
- Historical record within 600 years
- Radiocarbon dating (C14) dating to 10,000 years
- Local seismic activity
- Oral or folkloric history

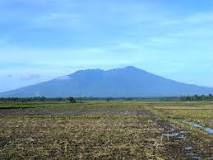
Mt. Isarog, a potentially active volcano in the Phillppines

=== Potentially active ===
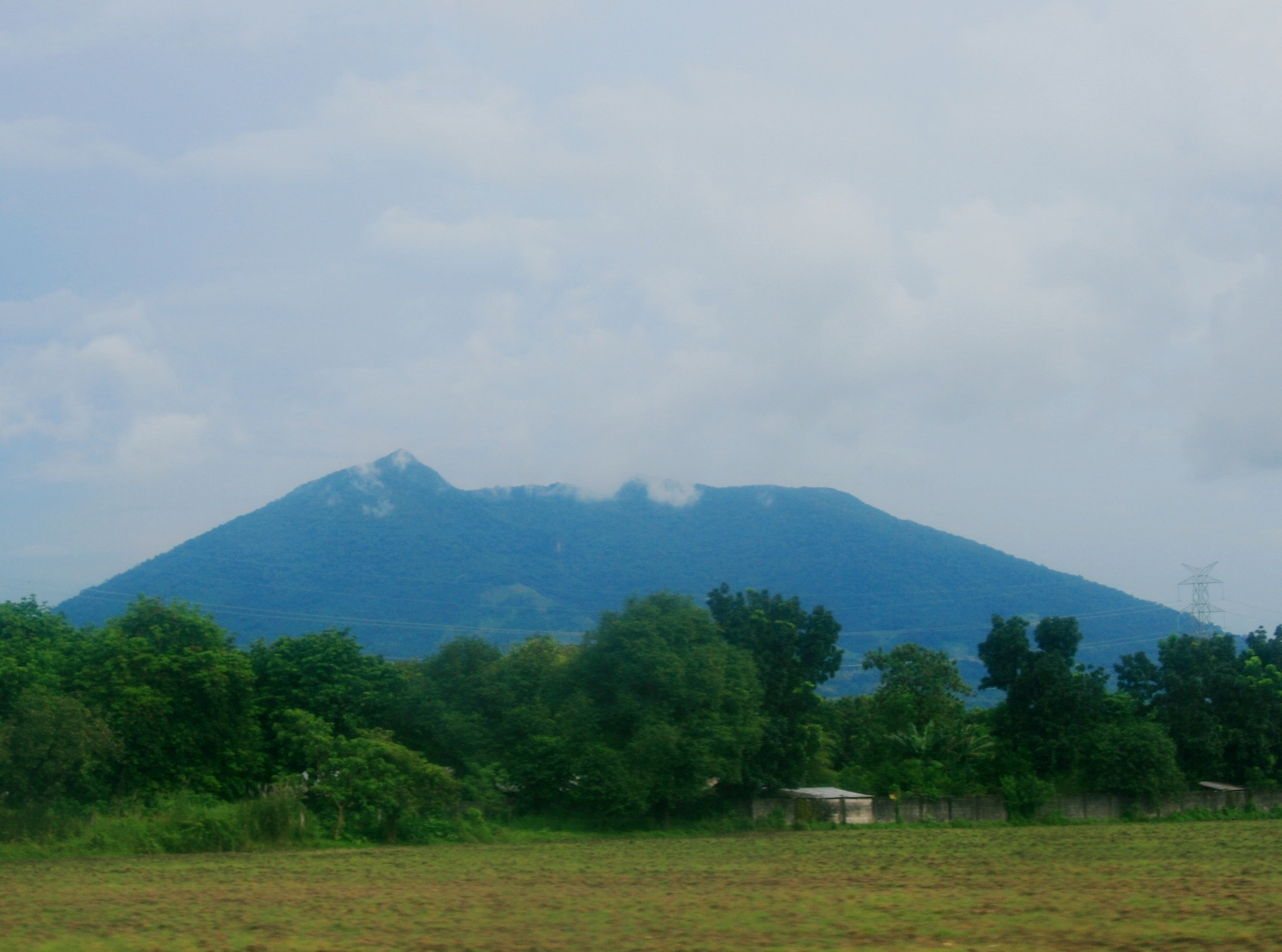
Mt. Arayat, a potentially active volcano in the Philippines.

- Active solfataras, fumaroles, or steaming activity
- Geologically young, possibly erupted < 10,000 years and for calderas and large systems, possibly < 25,000 years.
- Young-looking geomorphology (thin soil cover or sparse vegetation; low degree of erosion and dissection; young vent features; with or without vegetation cover).
- Suspected seismic activity.
- Documented local ground deformation.
- Geochemical indicators of magmatic involvement.
- Geophysical proof of magma bodies.
- Strong connection with subduction zones and external tectonic settings.

=== Inactive ===
- No record of eruption and its form is beginning to change by the agents of weathering and erosion via formation of deep and long gullies.

== See also ==
- Mines and Geosciences Bureau
- PHIVOLCS Earthquake Intensity Scale
- Geography of the Philippines
- List of volcanoes in the Philippines
- Manila Observatory
