= PHIVOLCS Earthquake Intensity Scale =

Philippine seismic intensity scale

The PHIVOLCS earthquake intensity scale (PEIS; Filipino: Panukat ng Pagyanig ng Lindol) is a seismic scale used and developed by the Philippine Institute of Volcanology and Seismology (PHIVOLCS) to measure the intensity of earthquakes.

It was developed as upon a specific response to the 1990 Luzon earthquake. PHIVOLCS cites seismic scale specifically developed for the Philippine setting, the different geography of each country and other "geological considerations" led to the development of PEIS. The scale measures the effect of an earthquake on a given area based on its relative effect to people, structures and objects in the surroundings.

The PEIS was adopted in the Philippines in 1996 replacing the Rossi-Forel scale.

== Scales ==
The PEIS has ten intensity scales represented in Roman numerals, with Intensity I being the weakest and Intensity X being the strongest.

PHIVOLCS Earthquake Intensity Scale (PEIS) Panukat ng Pagyanig ng Lindol
Intensity Scale	Description		Equivalent to other seismic scales	
Intensity Scale	Description		Modified Mercalli	Shindo
I	Scarcely perceptible (Napakahina)	Perceptible to people under favorable circumstances.; Delicately balanced objects are disturbed slightly.; Still water in containers oscillates slowly.	I	0
II	Slightly felt (Bahagyang naramdaman)	Felt by few individuals at rest indoors.; Hanging objects swing slightly.; Still water in containers oscillates noticeably.	II	1
III	Weak (Mahina)	Felt by many people indoors especially in upper floors of buildings.; Vibration is felt like one passing of a light truck.; Dizziness and nausea are experienced by some people.; Hanging objects swing moderately.; Still water in containers oscillates moderately.	III	2
IV	Moderately strong (Bahagyang malakas)	Felt generally by people indoors and by some people outdoors.; Light sleepers are awakened.; Vibration is felt like a passing of heavy truck.; Hanging objects swing considerably.; Dinner, plates, glasses, windows and doors rattle.; Floors and walls of wood framed buildings creak.; Standing motor cars may rock slightly.; Liquids in containers are slightly disturbed.; Water in containers oscillate strongly.; Rumbling sound may sometimes be heard.	IV	3
V	Strong (Malakas)	Generally felt by most people indoors and outdoors.; Many sleeping people are awakened.; Some are frightened, some run outdoors.; Strong shaking and rocking felt throughout building.; Hanging objects swing violently. Dining utensils clatter and clink; some are broken.; Small, light and unstable objects may fall or overturn.; Liquids spill from filled open containers.; Standing vehicles rock noticeably.; Shaking of leaves and twigs of trees are noticeable.	V	4
VI	Very strong (Napakalakas)	Many people are frightened; many run outdoors.; Some people lose their balance.; Motorists feel like driving in flat tires.; Heavy objects or furniture move or may be shifted.; Small church bells may ring.; Wall plaster may crack.; Very old or poorly built houses and man-made structures are slightly damaged though well-built structures are not affected.; Limited rockfalls and rolling boulders occur in hilly to mountainous areas and escarpments.; Trees are noticeably shaken.	VI	5-
VII	Destructive (Mapaminsala)	Most people are frightened and run outdoors.; People find it difficult to stand in upper floors.; Heavy objects and furniture overturn or topple.; Big church bells may ring.; Old or poorly built structures suffer considerable damage.; Some well-built structures are slightly damaged.; Some cracks may appear on dikes, fish ponds, road surface, or concrete hollow block walls.; Limited liquefaction, lateral spreading and landslides are observed.; Trees are shaken strongly.	VII	5+
VIII	Very destructive (Lubusang mapaminsala)	People are panicky.; People find it difficult to stand even outdoors.; Many well-built buildings are considerably damaged.; Concrete dikes and foundation of bridges are destroyed by ground settling or toppling.; Railway tracks are bent or broken.; Tombstones may be displaced, twisted or overturned.; Utility posts, towers and monuments may tilt or topple.; Water and sewer pipes may be bent, twisted or broken.; Liquefaction and lateral spreading cause man-made structure to sink, tilt or topple.; Numerous landslides and rockfalls occur in mountainous and hilly areas.; Boulders are thrown out from their positions particularly near the epicenter.; Fissures and faults rapture may be observed.; Trees are violently shaken.; Water splash or stop over dikes or banks of rivers.	VIII, IX	6-
IX	Devastating (Mapanalanta)	People are forcibly thrown to ground. Many cry and shake with fear.; Most buildings are totally damaged.; Bridges and elevated concrete structures are toppled or destroyed.; Numerous utility posts, towers and monument are tilted, toppled or broken.; Water sewer pipes are bent, twisted or broken.; Landslides and liquefaction with lateral spreadings and sandboils are widespread.; The ground is distorted into undulations.; Trees are shaken very violently with some toppled or broken.; Boulders are commonly thrown out.; River water splashes violently on slops over dikes and banks.	X, XI	6+
X	Completely devastating (Lubusang mapanalanta)	Practically all man-made structures are destroyed.; Massive landslides and liquefaction, large scale subsidence and uplifting of land forms and many ground fissures are observed.; Changes in river courses and destructive seiches in large lakes occur.; Many trees are toppled, broken and uprooted.	XII	7
