= Subduction tectonics of the Philippines =

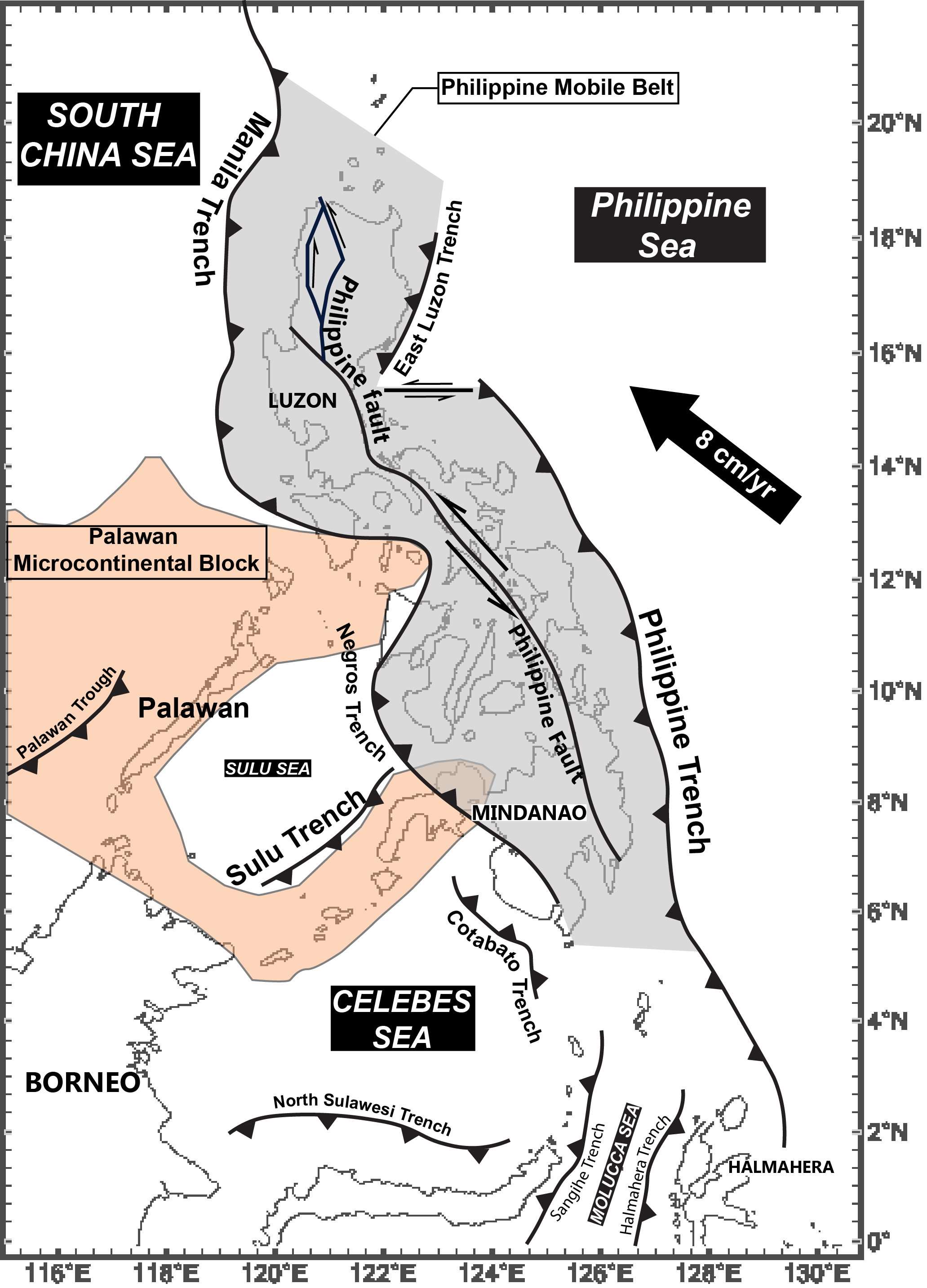
Tectonic overview of the Philippines. Orange shading represents the Palawan Microcontinental Block; grey shading represents the Philippine Mobile Belt. The direction of triangles represents the direction of subduction.

The subduction tectonics of the Philippines is the control of geology over the Philippine archipelago. The Philippine region is seismically active and has been progressively constructed by plates converging towards each other in multiple directions. The region is also known as the Philippine Mobile Belt due to its complex tectonic setting.

The region is bounded by subduction zones, where surrounding oceanic plates to the east and west slide towards the centre of the Philippine archipelago. Subduction results in deep oceanic trenches, such as the Philippine Trench and Manila Trench, which bound the eastern and western sides of the Philippine archipelago, respectively. The Philippine archipelago is also cut along its length by a left-lateral strike-slip fault known as the Philippine Fault.

Active subduction disturbs the Earth's crust, leading to volcanic activity, earthquakes, and tsunamis, making the Philippines one of the most geologically hazard-prone regions on Earth.

== Tectonic units ==
=== Philippine Sea plate ===
Philippine Sea plate is an oceanic plate surrounded by subduction zones. The plate is moving northwest at a rate of 6–8 cm (2.4–3.1 in) per year towards the Eurasian plate. Ranken and Cardwell (1984) showed that the rate of convergence increases southwards along the trench. The plate rotates with respect to the pole near the triple junction of the Philippine Sea, Eurasian, and Pacific plates at the northern tip of Philippine Sea plate. The rate of rotation is about 0.5˚/million years, yielding a total of approximately 90˚ rotation since the early Tertiary. It is generally suggested that the plate motion has been constant since 3–5 Ma (million years ago), but some study argued that the direction of plate propagation changed at about 1 Ma.

=== Philippine Mobile Belt ===
The Philippine Mobile Belt (also called as Taiwan–Luzon–Mindoro Mobile Belt) is a complex tectonic zone which sits at the convergence zone of the Eurasian plate, Philippine Sea plate, and Indo-Australian plate. It covers the whole Philippine archipelago and extends southwards to the Molucca Sea and eastern Indonesia. The belt is seismically active, and thus experiences frequent earthquakes and active volcanism.

The Philippine Mobile Belt is bounded by convergence zones of different polarities: east-dipping subduction at the Manila Trench, Negros Trench, Sulu Trench, and Cotabato Trench to the west; and west-dipping subduction at the Philippine Trench and East Luzon Trough along its eastern boundary. The belt is tectonically separated from surrounding plates, and thus regarded as an "independent block" or "microplate" in the Philippines. Regardless of the uncoupling with surrounding tectonic units, the Philippine Mobile Belt has an affinity to both the Eurasian plate and the Philippine Sea plate. It contains volcanic arc materials from the Philippine Sea plate, as well as crustal materials from the Eurasian plate. It is very difficult to define a clear tectonic boundary as much information along the Philippine Mobile Belt is swept away by the Philippine Fault, a strike-slip fault traversing the mobile belt.

==== Active zones in the Philippine Mobile Belt ====
The Philippine Mobile Belt can be separated into two active zones: the "western active zone" and the "eastern active zone". The western active zone is bounded to the west by east-dipping subduction zones like the Manila Trench, whilst the eastern active zone is bounded to the east by west-dipping subduction zones like the Philippine Trench. As the Philippine Mobile Belt sits in between the bipolar subduction of Eurasian plate to the west and the Philippine Sea plate to the east, the belt experiences east–west compression, resulting in folds and thrusts zones.

=== Philippine Fault Zone ===
The Philippine Fault is a left-lateral strike-slip fault which cuts across the Philippine archipelago behind the subduction zone. It is a northwest–southeast trending fault, which aligns subparallel to the Philippine Trench, extends from northern Luzon to Mindanao. It is influential in controlling the regional geodynamics and kinematics within the Philippine Trench system.

R. Hall (1987) predicts the average velocity along the strike-slip fault is 0.5 cm (0.20 in) per year, while some of the other models predict the velocity of 2–3 cm (0.79–1.18 in) per year. However, models agreed that the onset of the Philippine Fault was between 2–4 Ma, and that it propagated southwards to the present southern termination at the northeast of Halmahera.

==== Shear Partitioning Mechanism ====
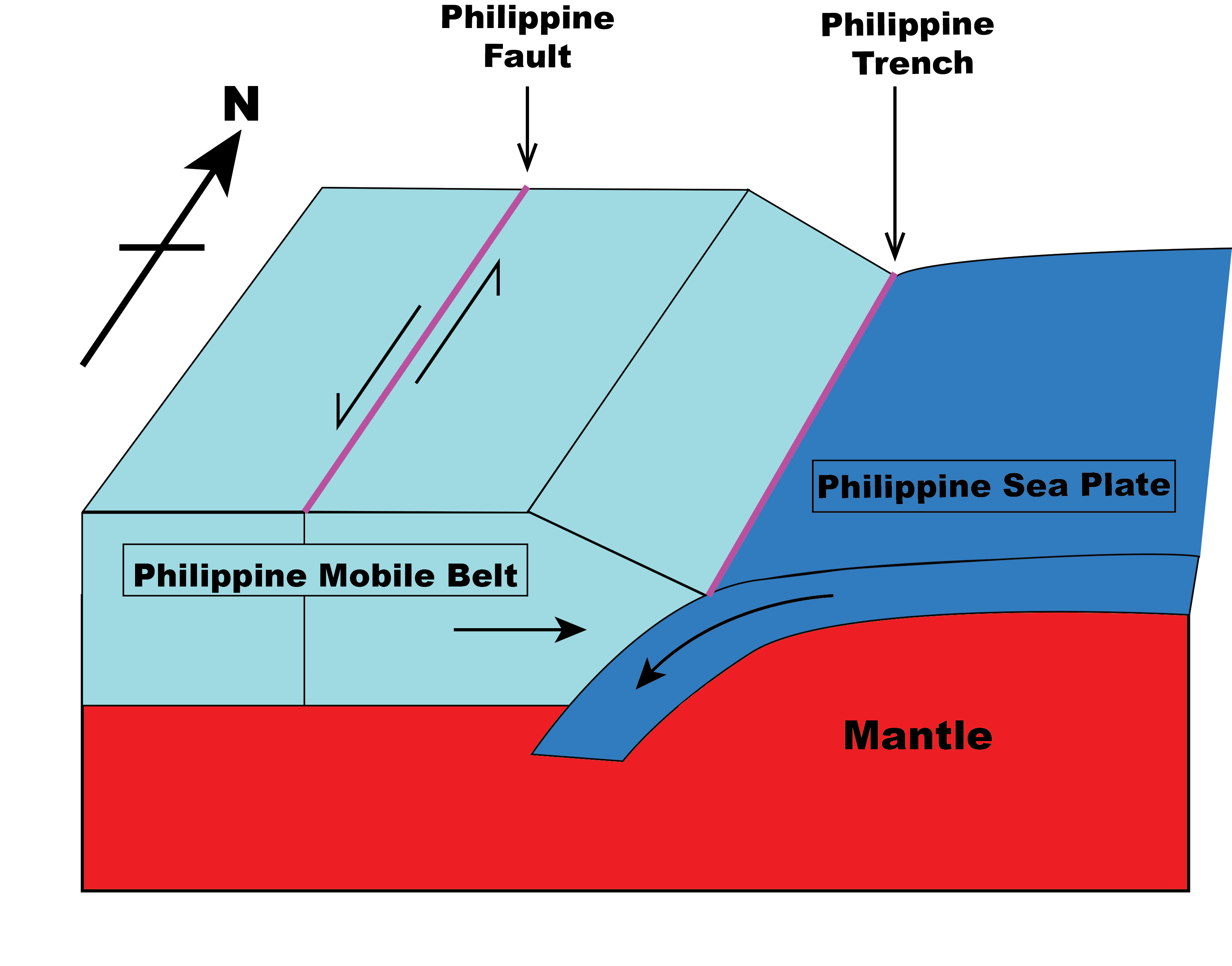
Shear partitioning mechanism in Philippine Fault (illustration is modified from Aurelio (2000))

The shear partitioning mechanism in the Philippine Fault-Trench System was first proposed by Fitch in 1972. In his model, the motion of plate convergence is partitioned into two components: one component parallel to the fault, and the other perpendicular to the trench subduction. He suggested that the strike-slip fault is responsible for taking up stresses that cannot be accommodated by the subduction systems surrounding the Philippine Mobile Belt. In the case of the Philippine Trench system, as the Philippine Sea plate propagates towards the trench obliquely, the displacement vector is composed of two components: northward lateral motion of the "western active zone" of the Philippine Mobile Belt, and the westward subduction perpendicular of the Philippine Sea plate. The hypothesis of shear partitioning mechanism was agreed by Aurelio (2000) by tracking crustal movement using Global Positioning System (GPS) data.

It has been hypothesized that the trench and fault formed in a synchronized manner; both may have propagated southwards since the middle to late Miocene.

More branching is observed over the northern and southern segments of the fault zone, which implies the Luzon and Mindanao–Moluccas regions are associated with a more complex tectonic setting.

=== Palawan Microcontinental Block ===
The Palawan Block is an aseismic microcontinent to the west of the Philippine Mobile Belt. It originated from the southeastern continental margin of the Eurasian plate. The Palawan Block broke off from the Eurasian plate during the late Eocene, and started colliding with the Philippine Mobile Belt between the Oligocene and late Miocene.

Geographically, Mindoro, Palawan Islands, northwestern Panay, and Romblon Islands are also considered part of the Palawan Microcontinental Block.

Some models argue that the convergence of the two microcontinents triggered the east-dipping subduction at the Manila Trench and Negros Trench in the early Miocene, as well as the later formation of the Philippine Fault Zone and Philippine Trench.

== Active subduction tectonics ==
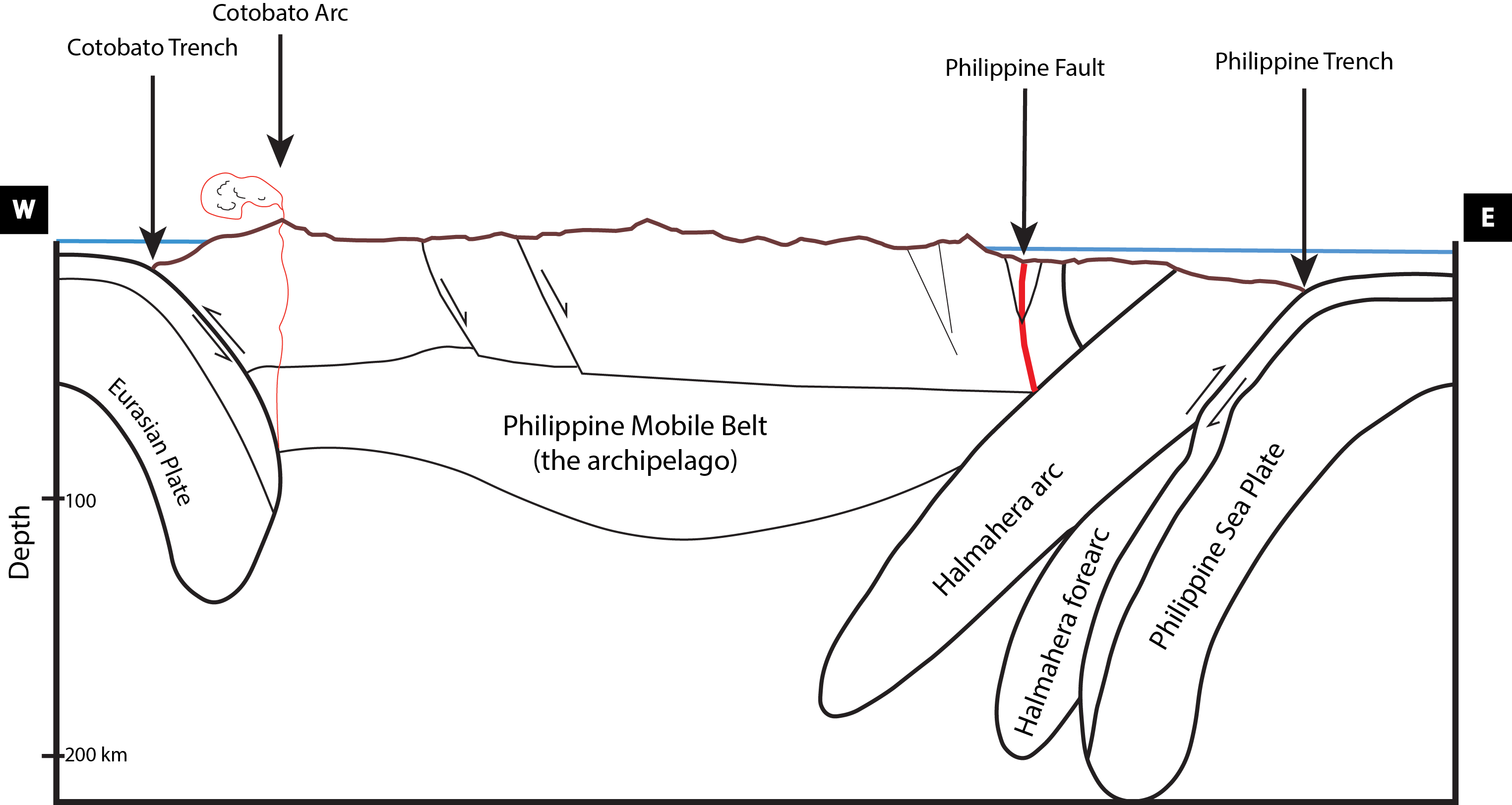
Cross-section of the Philippine Mobile Belt bounded by subduction in different polarities

Subduction zones in the Philippine Mobile Belt can be characterized into two major groups: east-dipping subduction to the western boundary, and west-dipping subduction to the eastern boundary.

=== Manila Trench ===
The Manila Trench results from eastward subduction of the Eurasian plate (Sundaland Block) beneath the western side of the Philippine Mobile Belt. Subduction along the north-trending trench started in late Oligocene to early Miocene. It has an average subduction rate at 1–2 cm (0.39–0.79 in) per year, slowing towards the north. A thick profile of sediment deposition in the well-developed forearc basin has promoted the formation of an accretionary wedge along the trench during compression. No accretionary wedge could be found on the eastern side of the Philippine Mobile Belt.

Several east-dipping trenches could be found south of Manila Trench (like Negros Trench and Cotabato Trench), which were formed after the Manila Trench during middle to late Miocene; the sequence of initiation is from north to south.

==== Luzon Volcanic Arc ====
The Luzon Volcanic Arc is a 1,200-kilometer-long (750-mile) volcanic belt extending from Taiwan to southern Mindanao. It results from the subduction of the Eurasian plate beneath the Philippine Mobile Belt along the Manila Trench since the early Miocene.

Volcanoes are younger in the south than in the north near Taiwan. Subduction started in Taiwan around 16 Ma, but there are younger volcanoes in Mindanao which are dated only to the Quaternary.

==== Palawan–Central Philippines collision zone ====
The collision between the Palawan Block and the central Philippines began during early to middle Miocene. Altogether, there are three observed collision zones which developed at different times. They are:

1. Romblon Island collision-related accretionary complex (early Miocene)
2. Mindoro ophiolite complex (middle Miocene–Pliocene)
3. South of Mindanao (present)

It is agreed that Romblon Island was the front-line of collision. The collision zone between the Palawan Microcontinental Block and the Philippine Mobile Belt shows a southwestern propagation through time. The mechanism behind the translation of the collision zone is still unidentified.

=== Philippine Trench ===
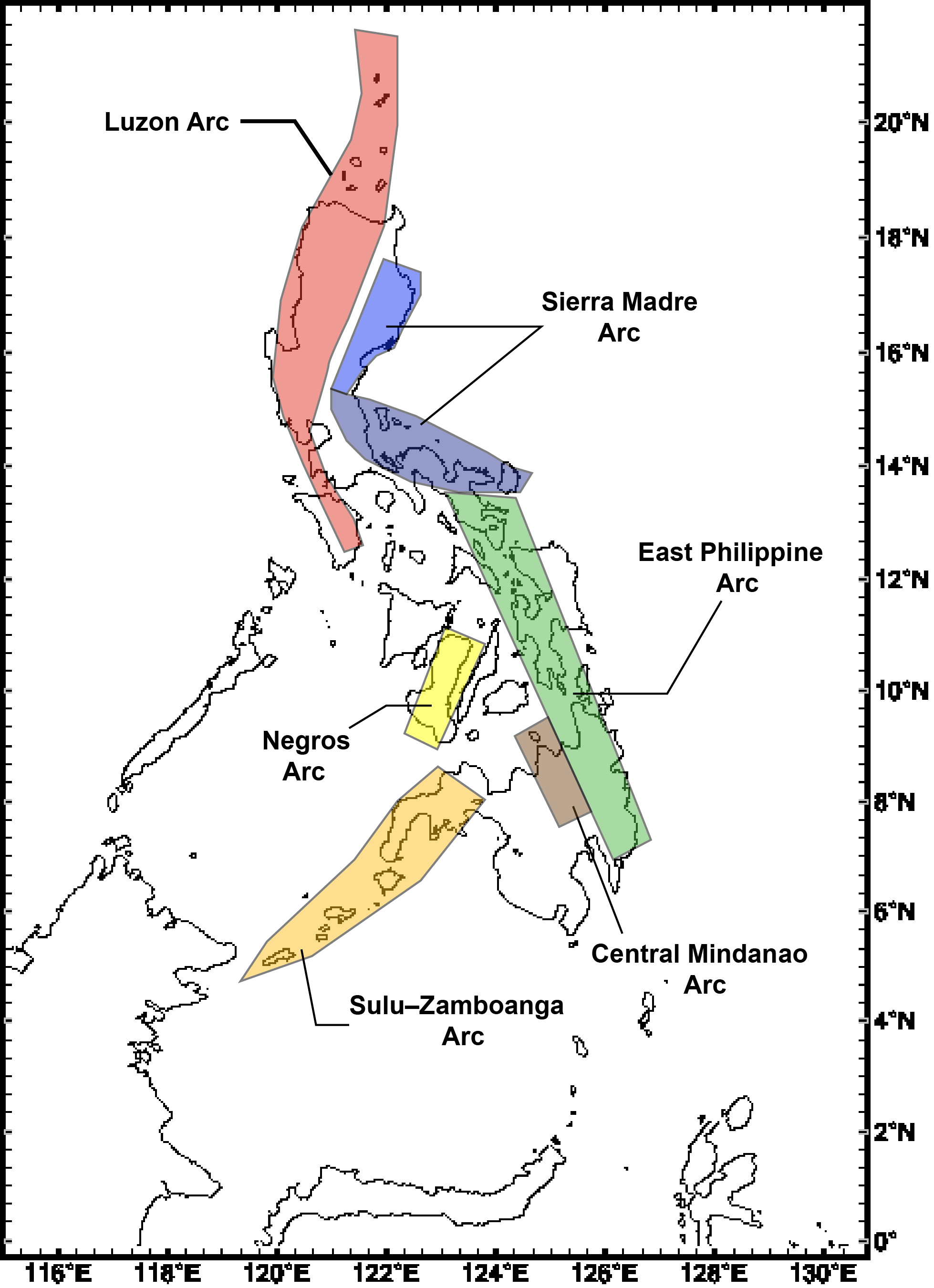
Major magmatic arcs in the Philippines

The Philippine Trench results from the westward subduction of The Philippine Sea plate beneath the Philippine Mobile Belt. The north-trending trench extends from the southeastern Luzon (15˚30’N) to the northeast of Halmahera (2˚N), with a total length of 1,800 km (1,100 mi) and a maximum depth of 10,540 metres (6.55 miles). It is linked to another east-dipping subduction zone to the north in the East Luzon Trough with an east–west trending strike-slip fault. The Philippine propagates northwards in the segment of East Luzon Trench.

The age of the Philippine Trench is not well-defined; estimates range from 5 Ma or younger, to 8–9 Ma. However, researchers agree that the Philippine Trench is the youngest trench in the Philippine subduction system.

The Philippine Sea plate moves towards the trench obliquely. The force of this plate convergence cannot be accommodated solely by the trench itself; therefore, the activity of the trench is coupled with the strike-slip Philippine Fault Zone. It is believed that both the trench and fault zone formed together during early Pliocene, and have since propagated southwards in a synchronized manner. The subduction rate increases southwards, with the highest convergence near the southern termination in northeast Halmahera, at a rate of 10 cm (3.9 in) per year.

The origin of the trench is related to the collision between Palawan Microcontinental Block and the Philippine Mobile Belt, which created first the Manila Trench and then the Philippine Trench.

=== Volcanic arcs ===
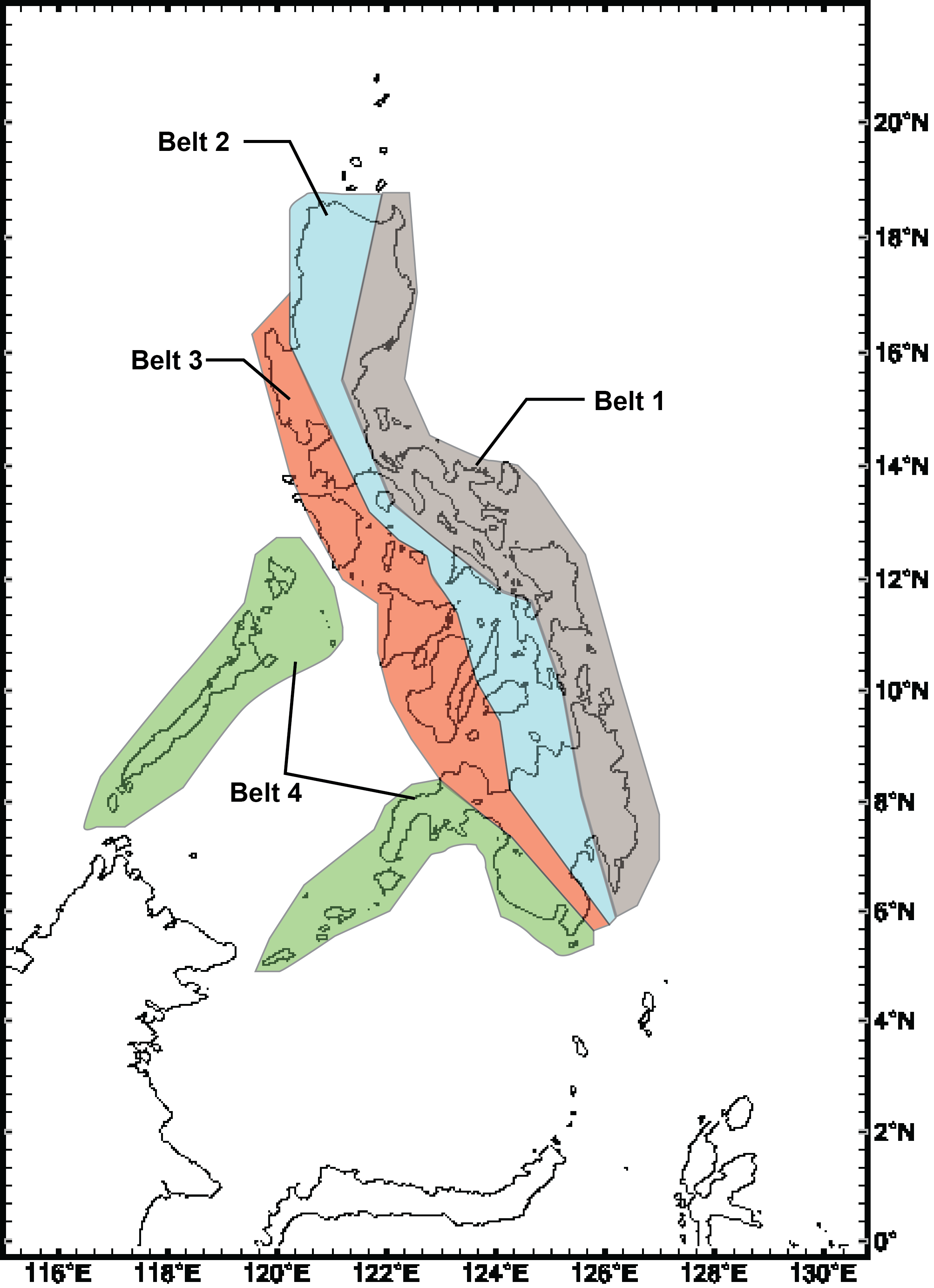
Ophiolite belts in the Philippine mobile belt. Belt 1 represents Late Cretaceous ophiolites; Belt 2 represents Early to late Cretaceous ophiolites with mélanges; Belt 3 represents Cretaceous to Oligocene along western convergence zone; Belt 4 represents ophiolites derived from Sundaland–Eurasian plate margin.

Both ancient and recent volcanic arc systems can be identified in the Philippine archipelago. Magmatic events in the archipelago are related to plate subduction, as reflected in the geochemistry of rocks. Rock composition along the major volcanic arc is generally of calc-alkaline to tholeiitic magma series. There are also some reported occurrences of adakite, which is often associated with the partial melting of basaltic component in subduction zones. Dating arc-derived rocks can constrain the timing for trench formation along with the tectonic evolution to within the Cenozoic.

The geochemistry of recent arc formation since the Oligocene is similar. The volcanic rocks also include high-potassium calc-alkaline series rocks, which reflect the island arc originality. Volcanic arc formation also favors mineral deposits—copper, gold, and nickel mines are found in the Philippines.

=== Ophiolitic belt ===
Ophiolite is suggested to be formed in subduction events in oceanic basins. The occurrence of ophiolite is common in the Philippines. Studying this ophiolite can help reveal the tectonic evolution of the region.

The majority of ophiolite in the Philippines was formed in the Cretaceous, with a minority formed in the Tertiary. Ophiolite in the Philippines is zoned into four groups geographically: the Eastern belt (1), the Central belt (2), the Western belt (3), and the Palawan belt (4). Dating the ophiolitic belts shows a trend of progressively younger formations from east to west—those in the east formed in the lower Cretaceous (oldest) and those in the west formed during the Eocene (youngest). This reflects the sequence of accretionary wedge formation along the western side of the Philippine Mobile Belt. The youngest western ophiolitic zone was formed in the Sundaland – Philippine Mobile Belt boundary, while the older eastern ophiolite was formed in the proto-Philippine Plate and is the basal rock of the Philippine Mobile Belt.

One of the well-preserved ophiolite formations in the province of Zambales in the Central Luzon Region is named Zambales Ophiolite Complex.

== Formation of the Philippine archipelago ==
=== Late Oligocene – Early Miocene ===
The west-dipping East Luzon trough ceased activity during the late Oligocene. During early Miocene, the Manila Trench was initiated, which is thought to have been caused by the counterclockwise rotation of Luzon which subsequently led to the collision of Palawan Microcontinental Block and the Philippine Mobile Belt. The Philippine Mobile Belt was accreted to the South China Sea Block, forming the Manila Trench. This model is supported by structural and geological evidence.

First, the suture zone, which is observed as metamorphic belts, marks the boundary between the Palawan Block and the Philippine Mobile Belt. This indicates a northeasterly verging by the Palawan Block in the Miocene. Moreover, islands to the northeast of Palawan experienced ophiolite emplacement, a process in which ophiolite is blended into the continental margin; this is thought to be related to collisions. Furthermore, a gap of volcanism in the central Philippines is recorded, which is also known to be caused by a collision event to the west of the Philippine Mobile Belt. And lastly, the coral reef bed was uplifted during the hypothesized collision episode, which reassures the collision event.

=== Formation of the Philippine Trench ===
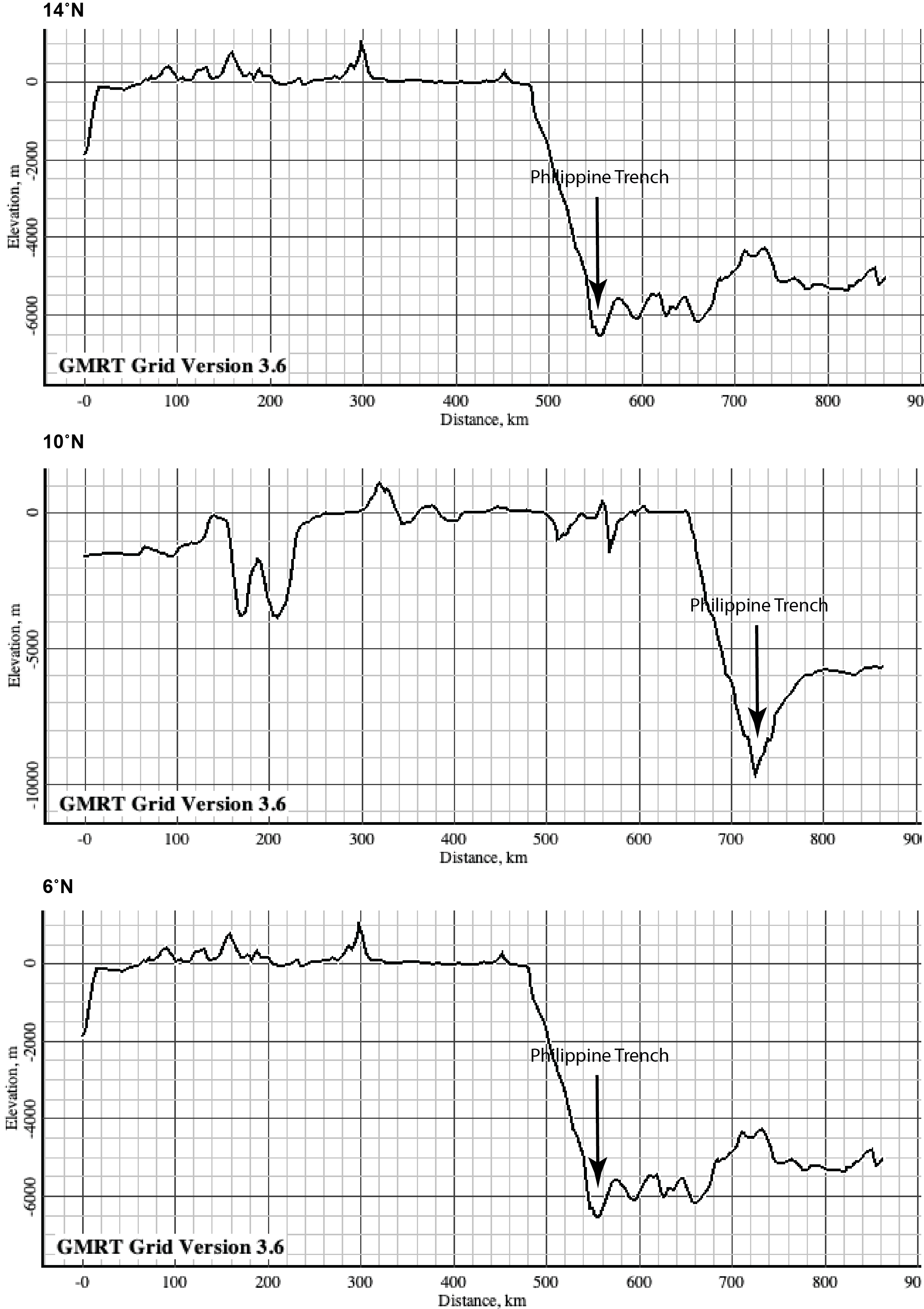
Bathymetric profile of the Philippine Trench. The trench is deepest around 10˚N (middle) and exhibits a shallowing trend northward (top) and southward (bottom).

The Philippine Trench is known to be formed by recent subduction. This was deduced by considering the shallowness of the subduction slab (indicated by shallow seismicity) and the subduction rate.

One hypothesis is that the formation of the Philippine Trench was related to the collision of the Palawan Block with the Philippine Mobile Belt. It is argued that the trench was formed as an outlet for the stress resulting from the Palawan collision. Adding compressional stresses to the incipient subduction, it progressively developed into a subduction zone.

Another hypothesis is that the Philippine Trench originated near Bicol (around 13˚N) and propagated southwards to its present abrupt termination at northeastern Halmahera (2˚N). This is supported by evidence such as variation in the ages of volcanoes along the trench, depth of subduction slab, and geometry of the trench.

The hypothesis is supported by evidence of the age of arc volcanism along the Eastern magmatic arc. The oldest volcano is located in Bicol, with age of 6.5 Ma. A southwards trend of progressively younger volcanoes along the trench from Bicol is observed, where the youngest subduction-related volcanic activities are observed right at the northeastern Halmahera. A similar trend is also observed heading northwards from Bicol to the northern termination of East Luzon Trough. These trends support the hypothesis of northwards and southwards propagation of the Philippine Trench from Bicol.

The geometry of the trench also gives evidence supporting the hypothesis of both northwards and southwards propagation. Lallemand et al. (1990) proposed that the trench was first formed near 9˚N then propagated towards north and south, resulting in a relatively symmetrical geometry to the north and south of 9˚N. The deepest part of the trench could be found around 9˚N, where the average depth of the trench is over 10,000 meters. The trench depth is progressively shallower to the north and to the south, with the depth near 8,000 meters at the southern terminal and around 6,000 meters at the northern terminal.

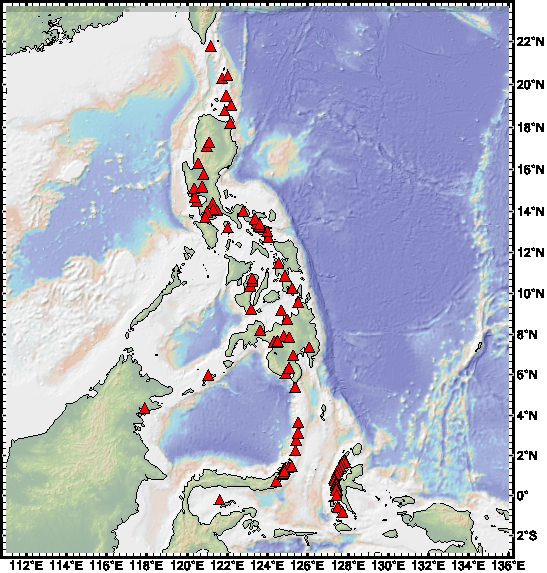
Volcanoes in the Philippines

== Tectonic hazards ==
=== Volcanoes ===
The Philippine archipelago is bounded by subduction zones which makes the region volcanically active. The most active volcano in the Philippines is the Mayon Volcano located in southeastern Luzon. It is related to the subduction of Philippine Sea plate beneath the Philippine Mobile Belt.

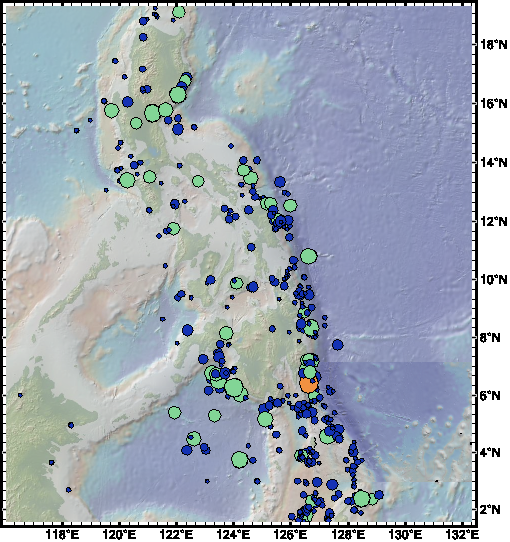
Earthquakes (mag >6.0) in the Philippines (2019) • Blue circles indicate magnitude 6.0–6.9 • Green circles indicate magnitude 7.0–7.9 • Orange circles indicate magnitude above 8.0

=== Earthquakes ===
Owing to its complex tectonic location on the Philippine Mobile Belt, the Philippine archipelago is seismically active. Faults and subduction zones are the seismic origins. Among subduction zones in the Philippines, subduction along the Philippine Trench produces the most active and frequent seismic activities to the region. However, as the Philippine Trench is a young subduction system, the majority are shallow earthquakes (less than 30 km).

== See also ==
- Philippine Mobile Belt
- Philippine Fault System
- Philippine Sea plate
