= Philippine Sea =

Marginal sea east and north-east of the Philippines

Philippine Seas
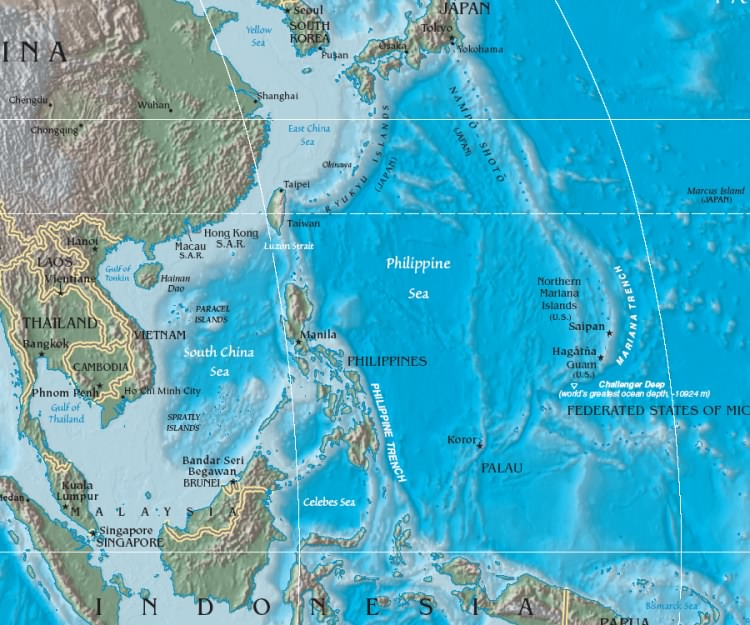

- Location within the Pacific Ocean Philippine Seas (North Pacific ) Philippine Seas (Philippines)
- Location: East Asia, Southeast Asia, and Micronesia
- Coordinates: 20°N 130°E
- Part of: Pacific Ocean
- Basin countries: List: Federated States of Micronesia Indonesia Japan Palau Philippines Taiwan United States (Guam and Northern Mariana Islands)
- Surface area: 5,695,000 km^{2} (2,199,000 sq mi)
- Islands: List: Bonin Islands; Catanduanes; Dinagat Islands; Green Island; Guam; Guiluan Island; Guishan Island; Halmahera; Homonhon; Honshu; Izu Islands; Karakelong; Kyūshū; Leyte; Luzon; Mariana Islands; Mindanao; Morotai; Orchid Island; Palau; Polillo Islands; Ryukyu Islands; Saipan; Samar; Siargao; Shikoku; Taiwan; Tinian; Ulithi; Yap
- Trenches: Izu–Bonin Trench; Mariana Trench; Nankai Trough; Philippine Trench; Ryukyu Trench

Philippine Sea

Alternative Chinese name
- Traditional Chinese: 菲律賓海
- Simplified Chinese: 菲律宾海
- Hanyu Pinyin: Fēilǜbīn Hǎi
Transcriptions
Standard Mandarin
- Hanyu Pinyin: Fēilǜbīn Hǎi

Japanese name
- Kanji: フィリピン海
- Kana: フィリピンかい
Transcriptions
- Romanization: Firipin Kai

Indonesian name
- Indonesian: Laut Filipina

Filipino name
- Tagalog: Dagat Pilipinas

Spanish name
- Spanish: Mar de Filipinas

The Philippine Sea is a marginal sea of the Western Pacific Ocean east of the Philippine Archipelago and the largest sea in the world, occupying an estimated surface area of 5 million square kilometers (2×10^{6} sq mi). The Philippine Sea Plate forms the floor of the sea. Its western border is the first island chain to the west, comprising the Ryukyu Islands in the northwest and Taiwan in the west. Its southwestern border comprises the Philippine islands of Luzon, Catanduanes, Samar, Leyte, and Mindanao. Its northern border comprises the Japanese islands of Honshu, Shikoku and Kyūshū. Its eastern border is the second island chain to the east, comprising the Bonin Islands and Iwo Jima in the northeast, the Mariana Islands (including Guam, Saipan, and Tinian) in the due east, and Halmahera, Palau, Yap and Ulithi (of the Caroline Islands) in the southeast. Its southern border is Indonesia's Morotai Island.

The sea has a complex and diverse undersea relief. The floor is formed into a structural basin by a series of geologic faults and fracture zones. Island arcs, which are actually extended ridges protruding above the ocean surface due to plate tectonic activity in the area, enclose the Philippine Sea to the north, east and south. The Philippine archipelago, Ryukyu Islands, and the Marianas are examples. Another prominent feature of the Philippine Sea is the presence of deep sea trenches, among them the Philippine Trench and the Mariana Trench, containing the deepest point on the planet.

== Geography ==
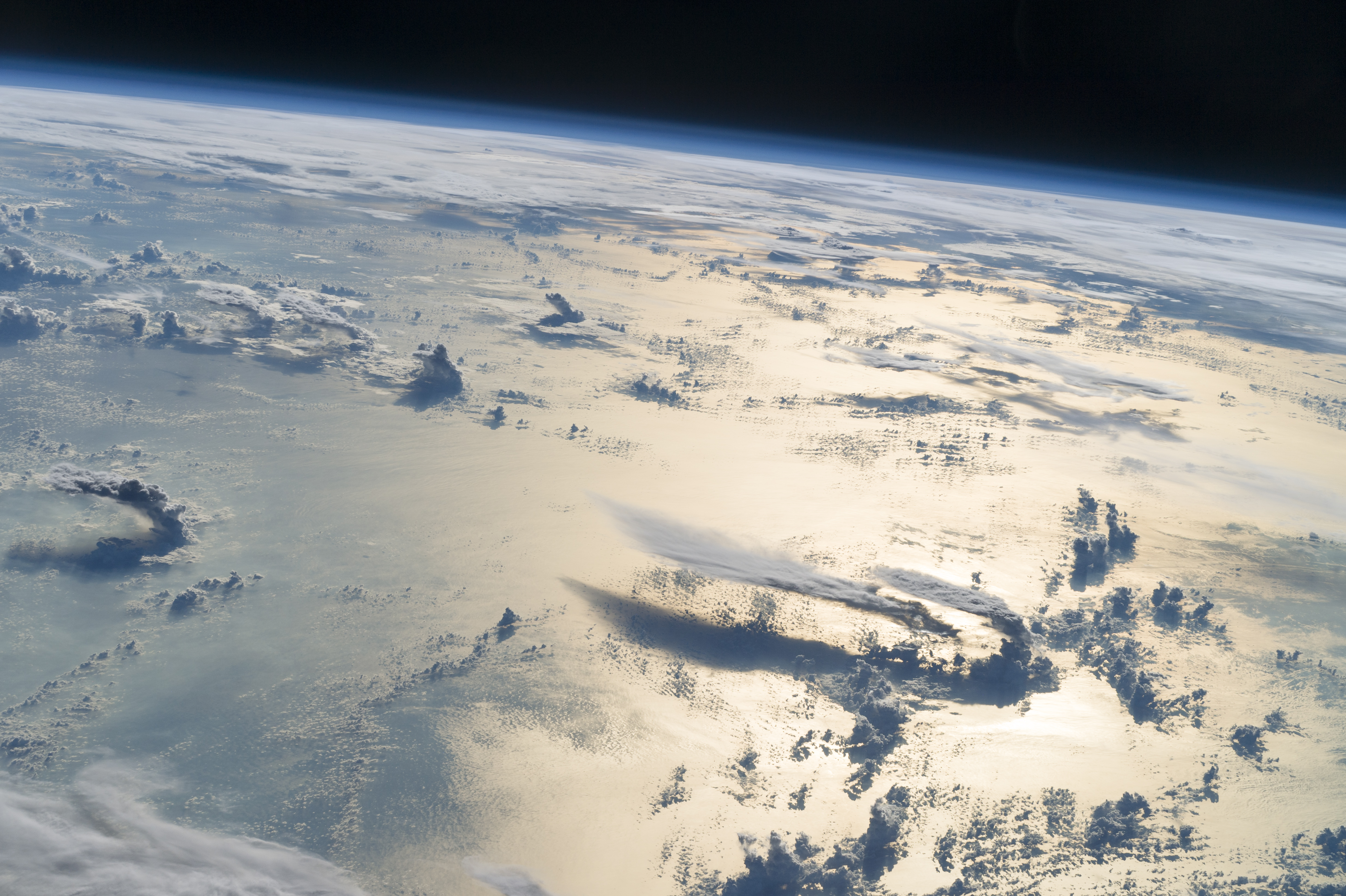
An image captured from the ISS while flying past the Philippine Sea in June 2016

=== Location ===
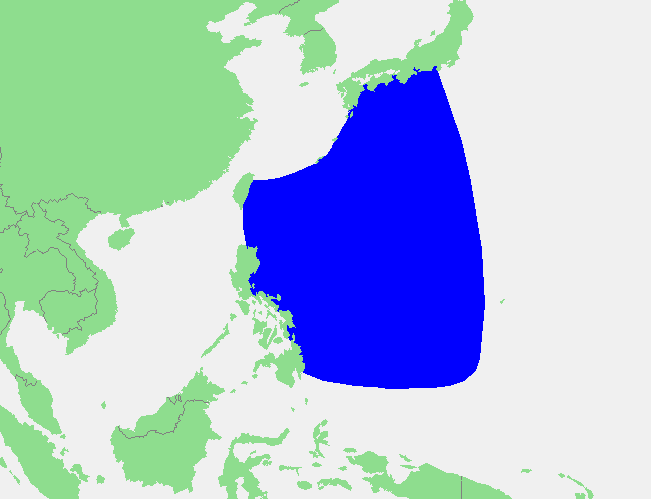
Location of the Philippine Sea

The Philippine Sea has the Philippines and Taiwan to the west, Japan to the north, the Marianas to the east and Palau to the south. Adjacent seas include the Celebes Sea which is separated by Mindanao and smaller islands to the south, the South China Sea which is separated by Philippines, and the East China Sea which is separated by the Ryukyu Islands.

=== Extent ===
The International Hydrographic Organization defines the Philippine Sea as "that area of the North Pacific Ocean off the Eastern coasts of the Philippine Islands", bounded as follows:

On the west. By the eastern limits of the East Indian Archipelago, South China Sea and East China Sea.

On the north. By the southeast coast of Kyushu, the southern and eastern limits of the Inland Sea and the south coast of Honshu Island.

On the east. By the ridge joining Japan to the Bonin, Volcano and Ladrone (Mariana) Islands, all these being included in the Philippine Sea.

On the south. By a line joining Guam, Yap, Pelew (Palau) and Halmahera Islands.

Countries and territories (red dot) bordering or within the sea (blue dot)

=== Geology ===
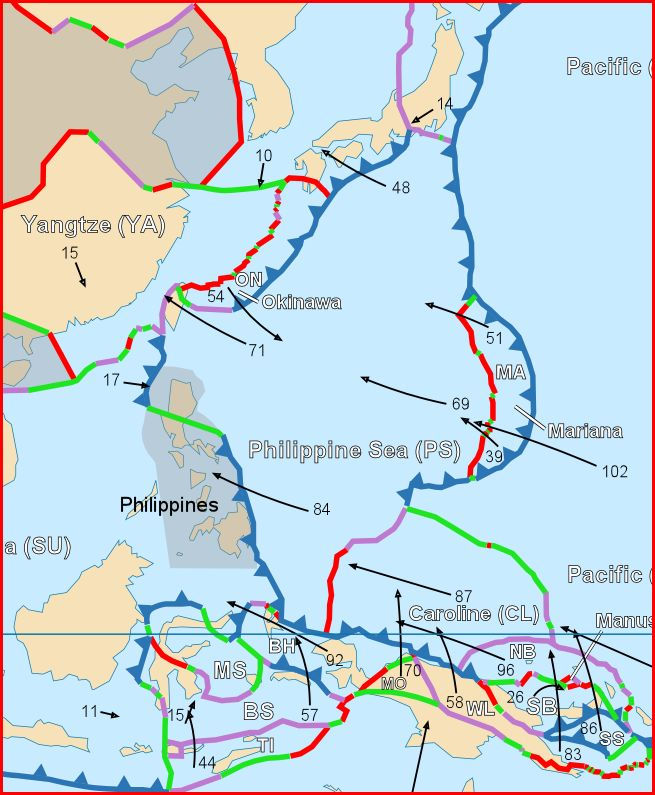
Philippine Sea plate

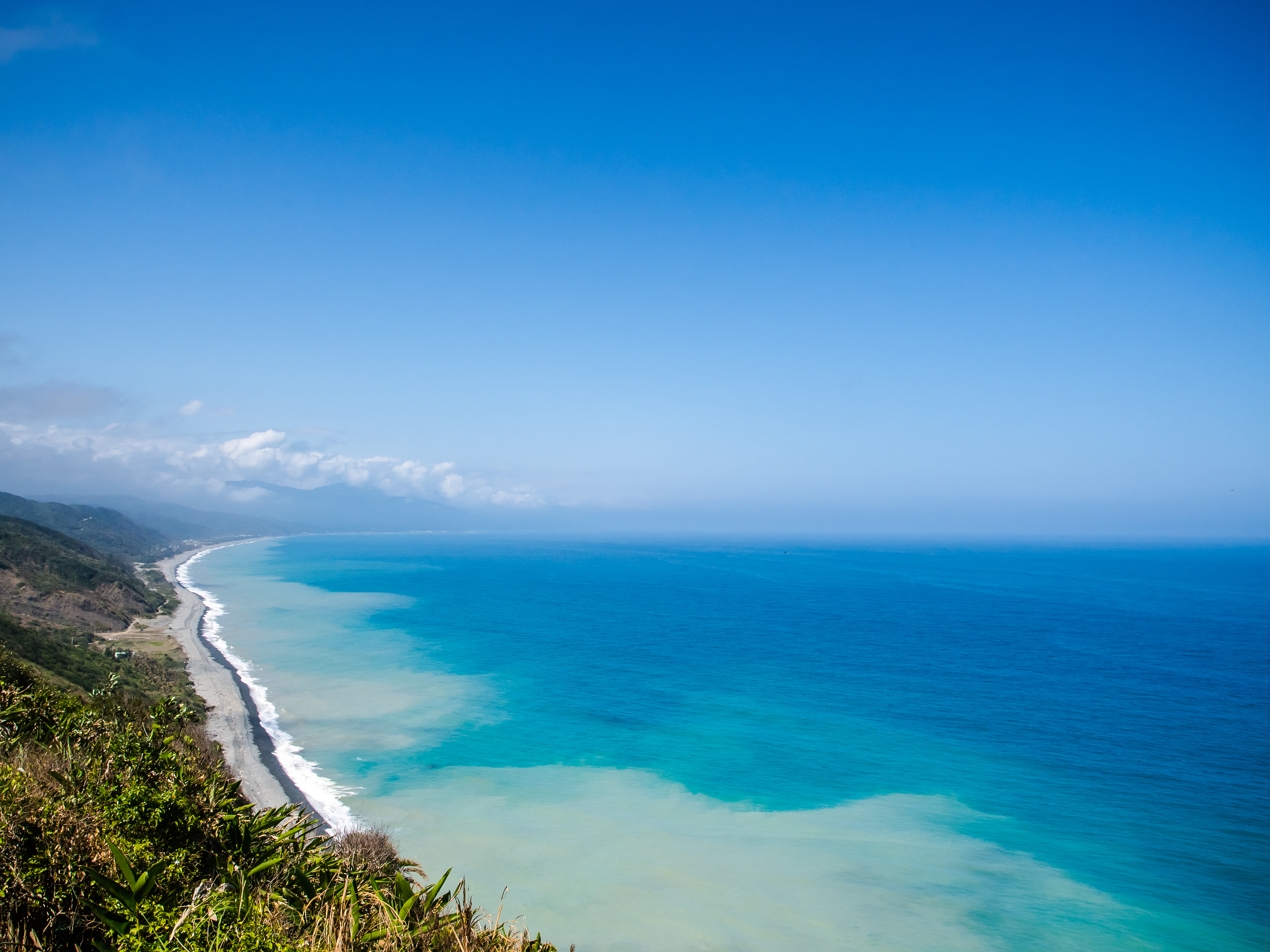
View of the beach, rocky coastline and the Philippine Sea in Pingtung County, Taiwan

The Philippine Sea Plate forms the floor of the Philippine Sea. It subducts under the Philippine Mobile Belt which carries most of the Philippine archipelago and eastern Taiwan. Between the two plates is the Philippine Trench.

=== Marine biodiversity ===
The Philippine Sea has a marine territorial scope of over 679,800 square kilometers (262,500 sq mi), and an EEZ of 2.2 million km^{2}. Attributed to an extensive vicariance and island integrations, the Philippines contains the highest number of marine species per unit area relative to the countries within the Indo-Malay-Philippines Archipelago, and has been identified as the epicenter of marine biodiversity. With its inclusion in the Coral Triangle, the Philippine Sea encompasses over 3,212 fish species, 486 coral species, 800 seaweed species, and 820 benthic algae species, wherein the Verde Island Passage is dubbed as "the center of the center of marine fish biodiversity". Within its territory, thirty-three endemic species of fish have been identified, including the blue-spotted angelfish (Chaetodontoplus caeruleopunctatus) and the sea catfish (Arius manillensis). The Philippine marine territory has also become a breeding and feeding ground for endangered marine species, such as the whale shark (Rhincodon typus), the dugong (Dugong dugon), and the megamouth shark (Megachasma pelagios). Within the South China Sea, Philippine scientists have discovered an abundant amount of marine life and species that have the potential to be biomedical advances for the Philippines as well.

=== Coral Triangle ===
The Coral Triangle (also called the Indo-Malayan Triangle) is considered to be the global center of marine biodiversity. Its total oceanic area is approximately 2 million square kilometers. It encompasses the tropical waters of Malaysia, Indonesia, the Philippines, Timor-Leste, Papua New Guinea, and Solomon Islands. The Philippine islands, which lie at its apex, make up 300,000 square kilometers (120,000 sq mi) of it. The part of the Coral Triangle's coral reef area that lies within the Philippines ranges from 10,750 square kilometers (4,150 sq mi) to 33,500 square kilometers (12,900 sq mi). It contains over 500 species of scleractinian or stony corals, and at least 12 endemic coral species.

The Coral Triangle contains 75% of the world's coral species (around 600 species). It is home to over 2000 types of reef fish, and six of the world's seven species of marine turtles (the hawksbill, loggerhead, leatherback, green turtle, olive ridley, and sea turtle). There is no single causal explanation for the unusually high biodiversity found in the Coral Triangle, but most researchers have attributed it to geological factors such as plate tectonics.

The Philippine Sea provides or supports the livelihoods of 120 million people, and is a source of food for the Philippine coastal communities and for millions more people worldwide. Whale-shark tourism in the Coral Triangle also provides a steady source of income for the surrounding community. The marine resources in the Coral Triangle have a high economic value, not only in the Philippines, but across the globe. The countries surrounding the Coral Triangle work to provide their people with technical assistance and other resources needed to promote conservation, sustainability, biodiversity, food security, sources of livelihood, and economic development.

Climate change is affecting the coastal ecosystem found in the Coral Triangle. It is contributing to rising sea levels and ocean acidification, thus endangering marine animals like fish and turtles. This has a negative effect on local sources of livelihood, such as fishing and tourism. It is also making the waters warmer, which endangers corals. Warmer water causes corals to absorb more carbon dioxide. This alters the water's pH balance, making it acidic, a condition to which the corals are not adapted, and in which they are ill-equipped to survive.

== Biology ==
The Philippine Sea hosts an exotic marine ecosystem. There are 421 of the 577 known species of corals in coastal waters, including 19 seagrass species and 30 species of mangrove, both of which contribute nutrients to coral systems. The Philippines also consists of 20 percent of the shellfish globally. Sea turtles, sharks, moray eels, octopuses, and sea snakes, along with numerous species of fish such as tuna can commonly be observed. Additionally, the Philippine Sea serves as spawning ground for Japanese eel, tuna, and different whale species.

Pass of the ISS over Eastern Asia to the Philippine Sea and Guam

Islands in the Philippine Sea

=== Biodiversity ===
The Philippine Sea is a centre of marine biodiversity as well as a biodiversity hotspot. However, at least 418 species are being threatened because of unsustainable practices.

The rise in temperature change caused shifts in the marine ecosystems. which could cause corals to die due to changing sea temperature. As fish and other marine life rely on corals for sustenance and habitat, communities that rely on fishing are heavily affected as well. As the Philippine Sea is situated in a particularly active Western Pacific tropical cyclone basin, the physical damage caused by typhoons coming from the east can further destroy the marine habitats.

== History ==
The first European to navigate the Philippine Sea was Ferdinand Magellan in 1521, who named it Mar Filipinas when he and his men were in the Mariana Islands prior to the exploration of the Philippines. Later it was discovered by other Spanish explorers from 1522 to 1565.

=== Battle of the Philippine Sea ===
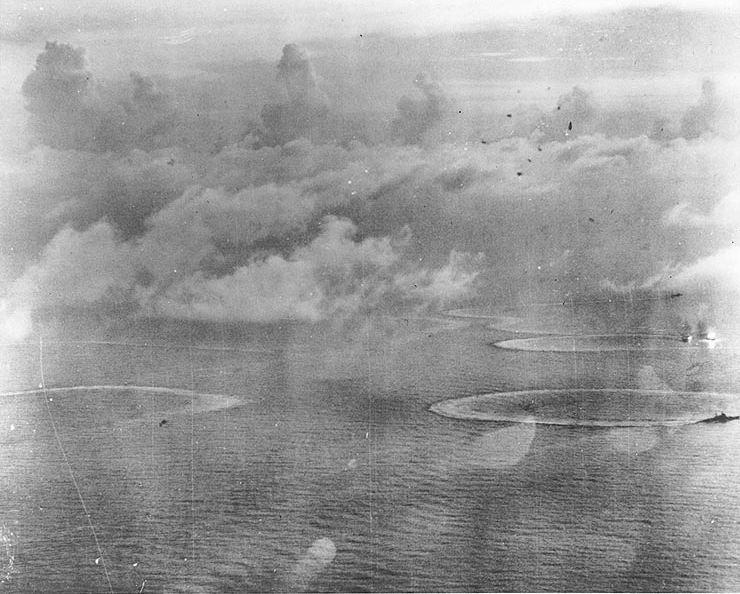
Japanese Carrier Division Three under attack by United States Navy aircraft from Task Force 58, late afternoon, 20 June 1944. The heavy cruiser circling at right, nearest to the camera, is either Maya or Chōkai. Beyond that, is the small aircraft carrier Chiyoda.

A historic battle between the naval fleets of the United States and Japan took place in the vicinity of the Philippine Sea. The Battle of the Philippine Sea occurred near the Mariana Islands from 19 to 20 June 1944. It was also the largest carrier-to-carrier battle in history, featuring the United States Fifth Fleet and the 1st Mobile Fleet of the Imperial Japanese Navy.

Aside from the navy, aerial activity was also present in the Battle of the Philippine Sea, as hundreds of aircraft from both countries fired at each other. The Americans indisputably won, and nicknamed the aerial war the "Great Marianas Turkey Shoot" due to the number of Japanese aircraft shot down.

Japan struggled to recover from the severe damages of its imperial navy and air strength suffered from the battle. This heavily attributed to the victory of the United States in the Battle of the Philippine Sea which was a vital part of the Americans' reclamation of the Philippines, and the Mariana Islands from Japan.

Typhoon Cobra, also known as "Halsey's Typhoon," was a tropical cyclone that struck the U.S. Pacific Third Fleet in the Philippine Sea in December 1944, resulting in the deaths of 790 sailors.

=== Post-World War II ===
In 1989, the United States Department of Defense revealed the loss of a one-megaton nuclear bomb in the Philippine Sea during the 1965 Philippine Sea A-4 incident.

Following an escalation of the Spratly Islands dispute in 2011, various Philippine government agencies started using the designation "West Philippine Sea" to refer to parts of the South China Sea. However, a PAGASA spokesperson said that the sea east of the Philippine archipelago will continue to be called the Philippine Sea.

== Economy ==
=== Fisheries ===
The Philippines depends on the Philippine Sea as one of the sources of its food, and for many people's livelihoods. In the Coral Triangle area, the Philippines harvests seaweeds, milkfish, shrimp, oyster, mussel, and live reef fish as aquaculture products. Fishermen catch many types of fish, including small pelagic, anchovy, sardine, mackerel, and tuna, among others.

Recent scientific expeditions have found that the Benham Rise (also known as the Philippine Rise) in the Philippine Sea has a diverse marine ecosystem that attracts migratory commercial fish like tuna, marlin and mackerel. The Benham Rise is a rich fishing ground for fishermen from Aurora, Quezon and Bicol. The Philippines Bureau of Fisheries and Aquatic Resources trains fishermen in sustainable-fishing techniques to prevent the destruction of coral formations, which could negatively affect the food chain that the migratory fish depend on. Migratory fish generally sell at high prices. For example, a single bluefin tuna from the Benham Rise can be sold at market for ₱2,000.

== See also ==
- Philippine Trench
- Philippine Sea Plate
- Benham Rise
- Devil's Sea
