= Sulu Trench =

Oceanic trench in Pacific Ocean

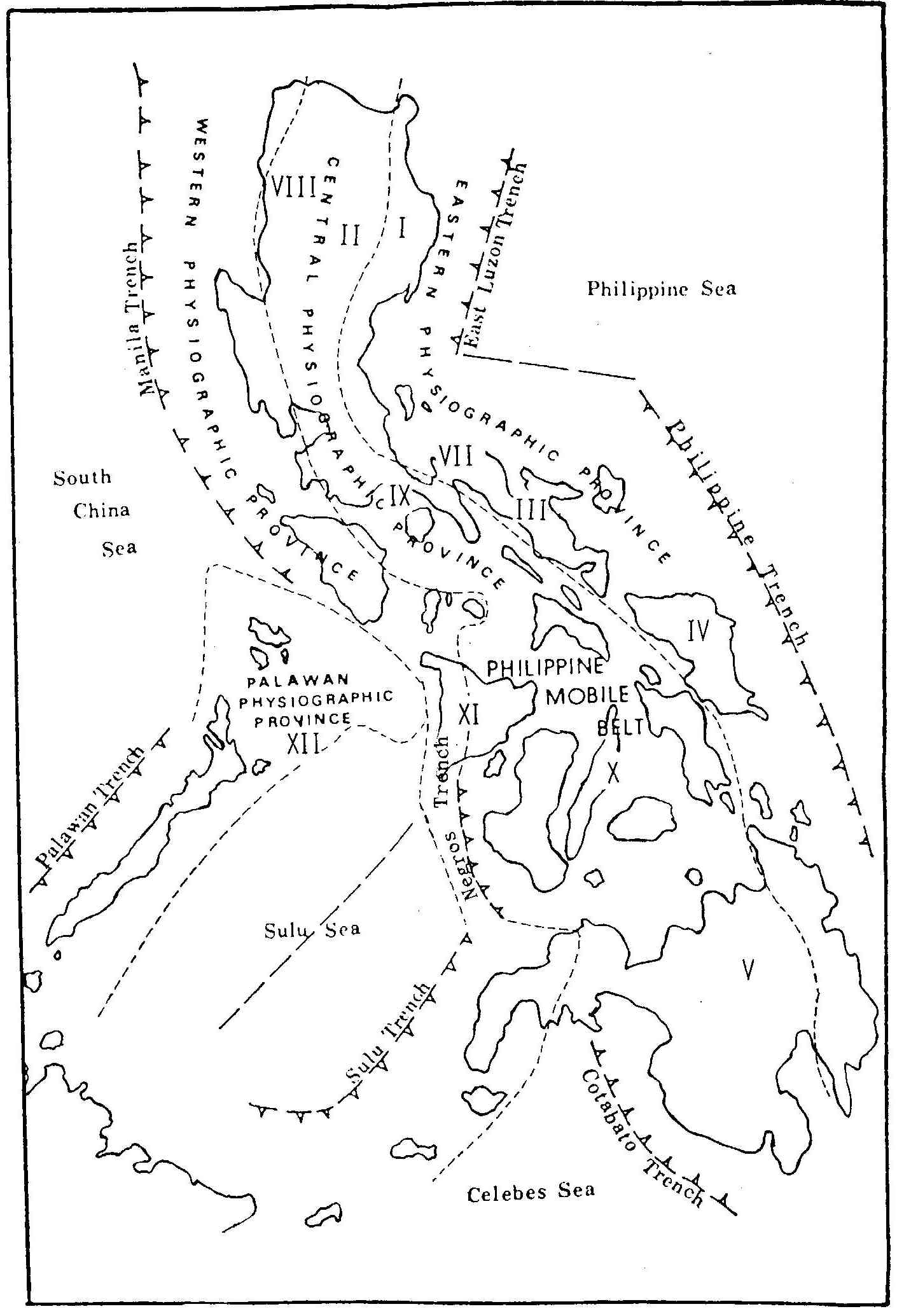
The Sulu Trench near the Zamboaga Peninsula, The Manila Trench in the North, Philippine Trench East North East, and Philippine Mobile Belt.

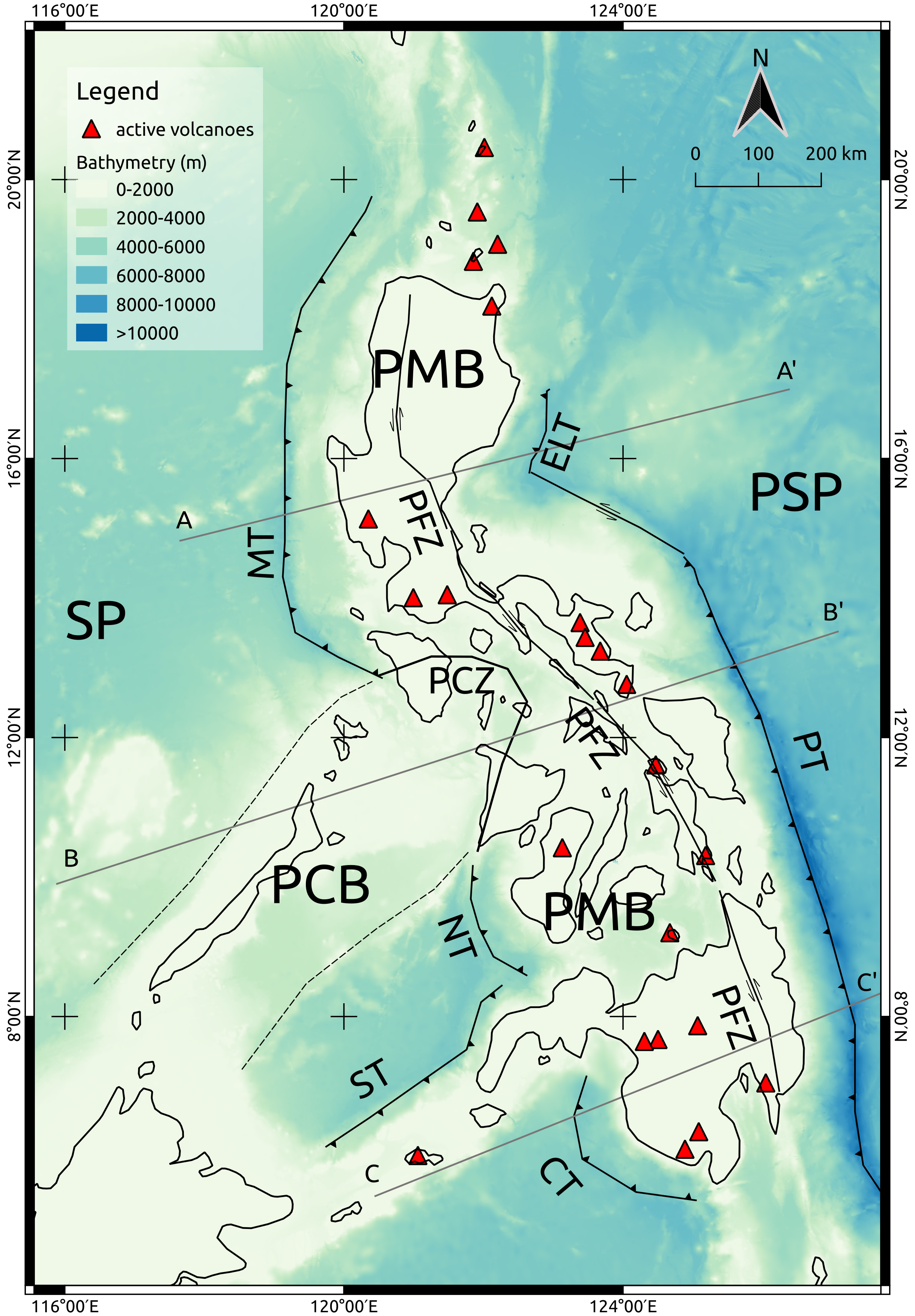
The Sulu Trench is marked as "ST"

The Sulu Trench is an oceanic trench in the Pacific Ocean, located west of the islands of Mindanao and Sulu in the Philippines. The trench reaches a depth of about 5,600 metres (18,400 ft), in contrast with the average depth of the South China Sea of about 1,500 metres (4,900 ft). The trench formed when the Sunda Plate (part of the Eurasian Plate) subducted below the Philippine Mobile Belt. The convergent boundary terminates at the Negros Trench in the east.

The Sulu Trench is not associated with frequent earthquakes, but hosts volcanoes south of the trench, such as Mount Malindang.

== Background ==
The Sulu Trench was formed from subduction of the Eurasian Plate underneath the Philippine sea plate, which initiated during the Early Miocene (23.03-20.44 Million years ago). Historically, the trench was the site of a collision zone with the Palawan plate, which formed the Philippine Trench 8–9 million years ago. The trench is located southwest of the Visayas and north of the Sulu Archipelago. It extends northeasterly in the Sulu Sea, from 6.20°N 119.60°E to 7.20°N 121.40°E. The rate of subduction in the Sulu Trench is approximately 8 cm (3.1 in) per year.

Although there are vast areas of subduction zones, some authors have considered this region to have low seismic activity. There have been several earthquakes with a magnitude ≥6.4 in the region, with one of the recent ones in 1978, hitting the trench with a hypocenter depth of 24 km (15 mi). Areas adjacent to the subduction zones have experienced large seismic activity. In 1942, Zamboanga Peninsula experienced a M7.2.

== Seismicity ==
This is a list of significant earthquakes related to the Sulu Trench which have a magnitude of 6.4 or bigger.

| Year | Location | Moment magnitude | Casualties |
|---|---|---|---|
| 1928 | east of Guipos | 6.8 | 97 |
| 1942 | south-west of Kipit | 7.2 | - |
| 1955 | west-northwest of Lapuyan | 7.4 | 400 |
| 1976 | east-southeast of Olutanga | 6.8 | 1 |
| 1978 | north-northwest of Kalawit | 6.9 | - |
| 1978 | south-southeast of Malim | 6.9 | - |
| 1984 | north-northwest of Tabid | 7.3 | - |
| 1985 | south-east of Muricay | 6.5 | 2 |
| 1985 | east-northeast of Malim | 6.4 | - |
