= North Luzon Trough =

Geologic feature off the Philippines

The North Luzon Trough is a major geological feature located off the northern coast of Luzon Island between the Manila Trench and the Vigan-Agao Fault in the Philippines. It is a well-developed forearc basin formed in front of the Luzon Volcanic Arc, an island arc system. The trough is a result of the active subduction of the Philippine Sea Plate beneath the Eurasian Plate.

== Geological formation ==
The North Luzon Trough formed as a result of the oblique convergence between the Eurasian and Philippine Sea plates. The Philippine Sea Plate is subducting beneath the Eurasian Plate at a rate of approximately 80 millimeters per year (3.1 inches per year). This oblique convergence creates a complex tectonic setting, with both compressional and extensional forces acting on the crust.

The trough itself is a forearc basin, which is a depression that develops in front of an island arc system. The subducting plate releases fluids and sediments, which accumulate in the forearc basin. These sediments can be uplifted and incorporated into the island arc, contributing to its growth. The trough is a well-developed basin with active subduction into the Manila Trench system with complexities stemming from the offshore extension of the Philippine Fault System into the trough. Multi-channel seismic data suggests that the basin's sedimentary deposits resulted from multiple periods of emplacement and erosion. Today, the trough contains a relatively stable zone and a deformation zone characterized by compressional deformation characteristic of past tectonic activity in the trough.
