= Negros Trench =

Geological feature in the Philippines

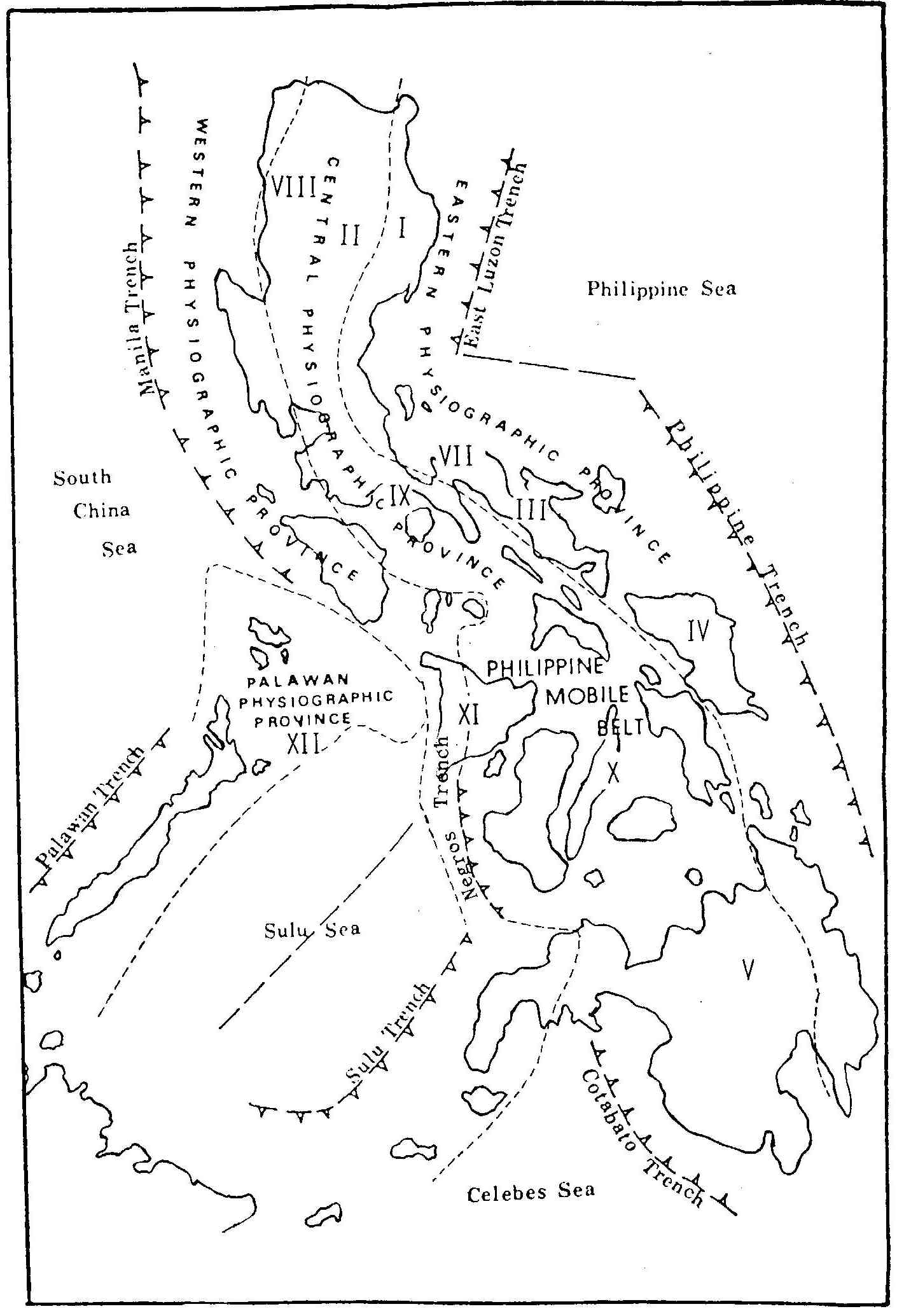
The Negros Trench 50-100 kilometers west of Visayas, The Sulu Trench in the southwest, Manila Trench west-northwest, and the Philippine Trench in the east

Epicenters of large earthquakes ≥ 6.4 M_{w} along the Negros Trench, from 1922 1925 1948 1950 1951 1990 2011 2012 2014

The Negros Trench is an oceanic trench located northeast of the Sulu Trench and west of Negros Island Region in Visayas, the trench is located in the Sunda Plate in the southwestern region of the Pacific Ocean. The depth of the Negros Trench is unknown, in contrast it's neighboring trench the Sulu Trench has a depth of 5,600. During the Early-Miocine, the Sunda Plate subducted below the Philippine Mobile Belt, which would later form the Negros Trench.

== Background ==
The Negros trench was formed from subduction of the Eurasian Plate underneath the Philippine Sea plate which initiated during the Early Miocene (23.03-20.44 million years ago), The trench was previously the site of a collision zone with the Palawan plate, which formed the Philippine Trench 8–9 million years ago, This trench is located west of the Visayan Islands. This trench moves 2–3 cm/year.

Although there are vast areas of subduction zones, some authors have considered this region to have low seismic activity. There has been a decent amount of earthquakes with a magnitude ≥6.4 in the region, with the most recent occurring in 2011. It hit the trench in a depth of 19.0 km. Areas adjacent to the subduction zones have experienced large seismic activity.

== Seismicity ==
| Year | Location | Moment magnitude | Depth | Casualties |
|---|---|---|---|---|
| 1922 | west of Looc | 6.5 | 15.0 km | - |
| 1925 | north of Nalundan | 6.7 | 15.0 km | 17 |
| 1948 | north-northeast of Buga | 7.8 | 15.0 km | 74 |
| 1950 | south-southeast of San Nicolas | 6.5 | 25.0 km | - |
| 1951 | west-northwest of Linaon | 6.5 | 25.0 km | 1 |
| 1990 | east-southeast of Union | 7.1 | 18.1 km | 8 |
| 2011 | west-southwest of Cayhagan | 6.4 | 19.0 km | - |
| 2012 | north-northeast of Jimalalud | 6.7 | 11.0 km | 51–113 |
| 2014 | west-southwest of Alim | 6.3 | 15.5 km | - |
