= 2012 Samar earthquake =

Earthquake affecting the Philippines

- Location within Philippines
- UTC time: 2012-08-31 12:47:33
- ISC event: 601667544
- USGS-ANSS: ComCat
- Local date: August 31, 2012
- Local time: 20:47 PST
- Magnitude: M_{w} 7.6
- Depth: 45 km (28 mi)
- Epicenter: 10°50′N 126°43′E
- Type: Reverse
- Areas affected: Philippines
- Max. intensity: PEIS VII (MMI VII)
- Tsunami: Yes (highest 20 inches)
- Aftershocks: 298
- Casualties: 1 dead, 1 injured

An earthquake off the coast of Samar occurred on August 31, 2012, at 20:47 local time (12:47 UTC) in the Philippines. The populated islands of Visayas were struck by an earthquake of magnitude M_{w} 7.6. The earthquake occurred at a depth of 45 km (27.9 miles). A tsunami warning was announced within the Pacific area and was lifted after two hours. The Philippine archipelago is located in the Pacific Ring of Fire, where earthquakes and volcanic activity are common.

== Geology ==
The Philippine Mobile Belt is between the Eurasia plate and the Philippine Sea plate. The Philippine Sea plate is subducting along the Philippine Trench in this region. At the latitude of the earthquake, the Philippine Sea plate moves in the WNW direction at a velocity of approximately 100 mm/yr with respect to the Sunda plate.

This event was an intraplate earthquake greater than 50 kilometers to the east of the boundary of the Philippine Sea plate. This earthquake was unusual in that it occurred as a result of reverse faulting within the oceanic lithosphere of the Philippine Sea plate. There have been approximately 40 events of M6 and above over the past 40 years, within 250 km of this earthquake. Most of those earthquakes were the result of normal faulting within the shallower oceanic lithosphere rather than deeper reverse faulting like this event.

== Earthquake ==
Strong earthquake events near the area were in April 1995 (7.2 M_{w}), May 1995 (7.1 M_{w}), June 1996 (7.1 M_{w}), and the Aug 2012 event (7.6 M_{w}). See also map below.

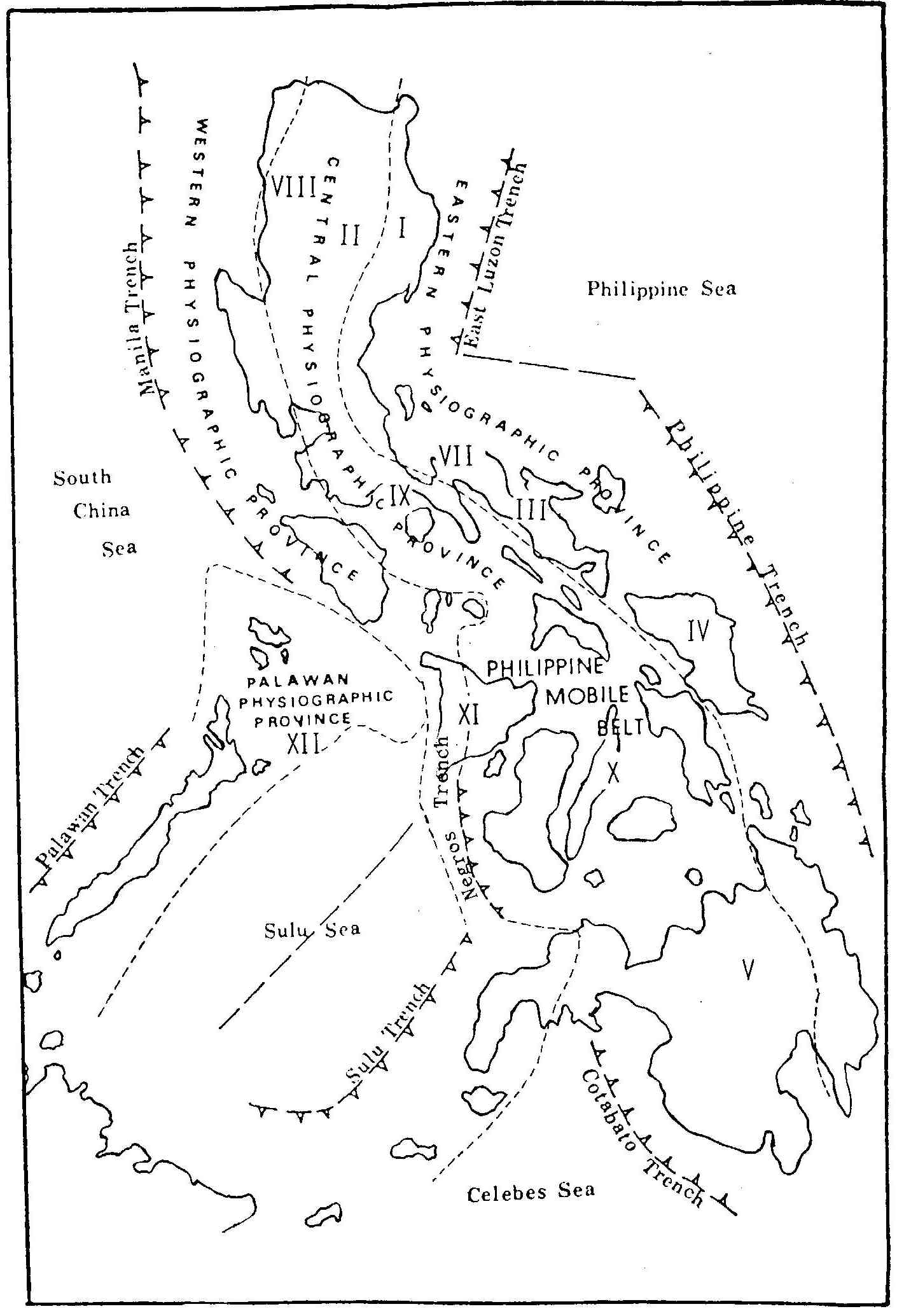
The Philippine Trench in the east, and the Philippine Mobile Belt.

After the initial earthquake, power supply was cut off in the affected areas after power lines were damaged. Power plants in Visayas tripped or shut down following the earthquake, although no major damage was sustained in transmission facilities.

A house in the southern city of Cagayan de Oro, Mindanao, was involved in a landslide along with several other homes, killing one of its inhabitants and hospitalizing another.

In General MacArthur, Eastern Samar, 77 homes were damaged. An additional six houses were damaged in Barangay Casoroy, San Julian. A wall from an old building collapsed in Butuan.

The National Disaster Risk Reduction and Management Council (NDRRMC) reported on Saturday noon that cracks had occurred in some structures such as bridges and roads. The damage was not severe.

== Intensity ==
2012 M_{w} 7.6 Samar earthquake PEIS intensity
Intensity Scales	Location
VII	Guiuan, Oras, Sulat, Borongan, Eastern Samar; Tacloban City
VI	Siargao, Surigao del Norte; Saint Bernard, S. Leyte
V	Mati City; Compostela; Legaspi City; Iloilo City; Bislig, Iligan City; Davao City; Cateel Davao Oriental; Roxas City, Capiz
IV	Butuan, Catbalogan, Cagayan de Oro; Dipolog; Manukan, ZN; Polanco, ZN; Tagum, Davao del N., Digos; Dumaguete; Bacolod
III	Cotabato City, Mambajao, Camiguin, General Santos; Dao, Capiz, Dingle, Iloilo; Kidapawan City; Jaro, Iloilo; Daet, Cam. Norte; Binalbagan Neg. Occ.; Sindanga, Zamboanga del Norte
II	Marawi City, Sipalay City, Hinigaran, La Carlota La Granja, Neg. Occ., Cebu City

== Tsunami ==
PHIVOLCS gave a level three tsunami alert in the Philippines and other institutes gave a level three tsunami alert in Japan, Indonesia, Taiwan, Palau indicating that the public should be on the watch for "unusual waves", but did not call for any evacuation. The Pacific Tsunami Warning Center rapidly issued tsunami warnings in the Pacific together with its adjacent islands. However, it was lifted after two hours as no tsunami was recorded. In Japan, the Japan Meteorological Agency issued tsunami advisories throughout the coastal areas of the country. The Hong Kong Observatory also issued a tsunami warning on Hong Kong at that same time.

About an hour after the quake, sea level readings from gauges in the epicentral region confirmed a tsunami was generated. A small 3 cm (1.2 in) wave was recorded at Legazpi in Albay province shortly thereafter, as well as further south near Davao City; slight sea level anomalies were observed in several other locations.

== Response ==
Based on preliminary estimates of the magnitude, specialists noted that a significant tsunami could have been generated. A tsunami warning was issued within eight minutes after the tremor for coastal regions of the Philippines, Indonesia, Taiwan, Guam, and Japan, as well as for the island nations of Palau, Yap, and Northern Mariana. A tsunami watch was at the time in effect for much of Micronesia, the Solomon Islands, Hawaii, and the Pacific coast of Russia. Most of the warnings and watches were quickly cancelled following revisions of the earthquake's magnitude, although the warnings for the Philippines, Indonesia and Palau remained in effect.

The tremor caused widespread panic in Eastern Visayas, where many inhabitants exited their homes. At the risk of destructive waves, officials in the Philippines urged remaining residents of eastern coastal areas to evacuate to higher ground.

== See also ==
- List of earthquakes in 2012
- List of earthquakes in the Philippines
- Philippine Trench
