= Philippine Mobile Belt =

Tectonic boundary

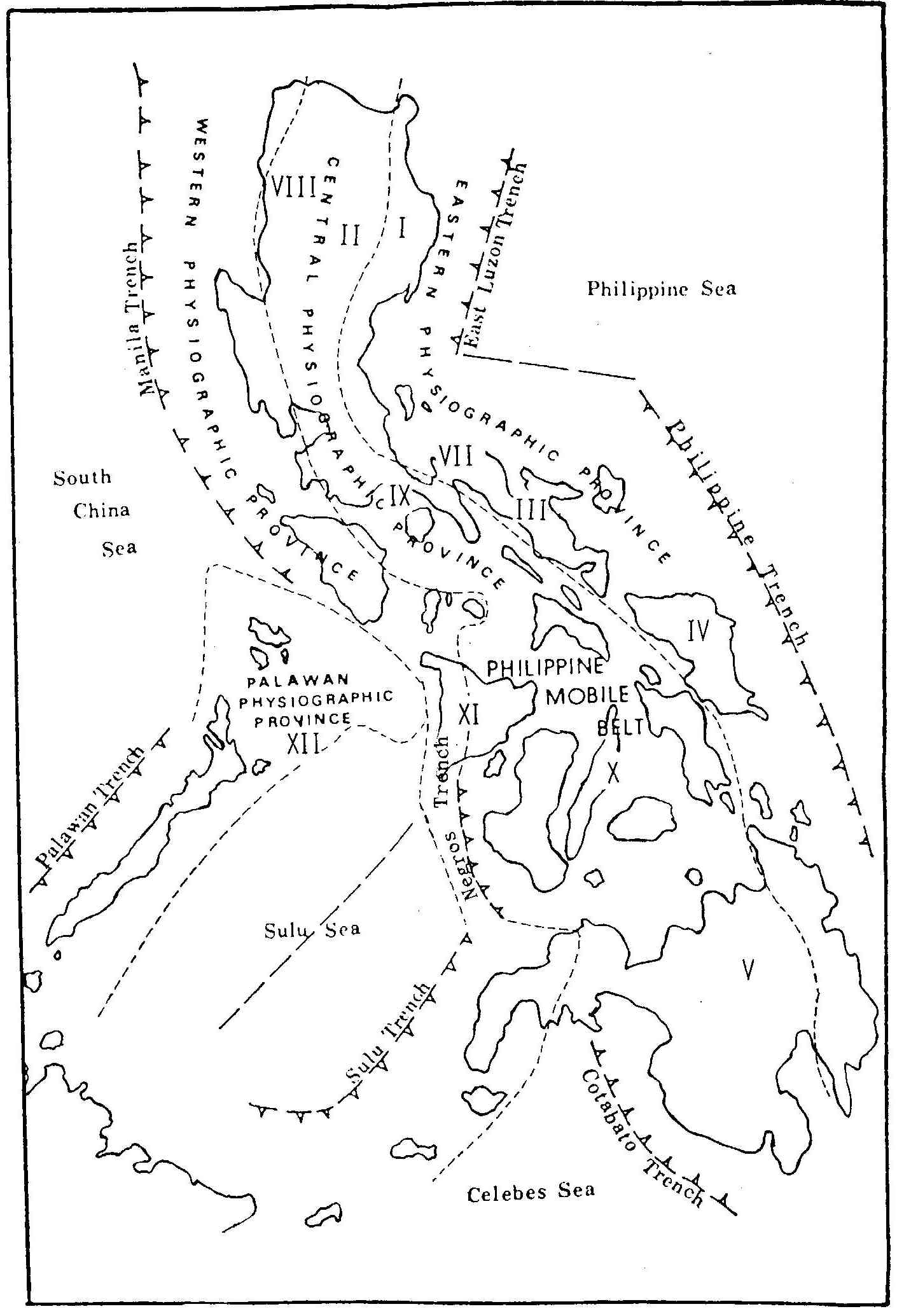
Major physiographic elements of the Philippine Mobile Belt

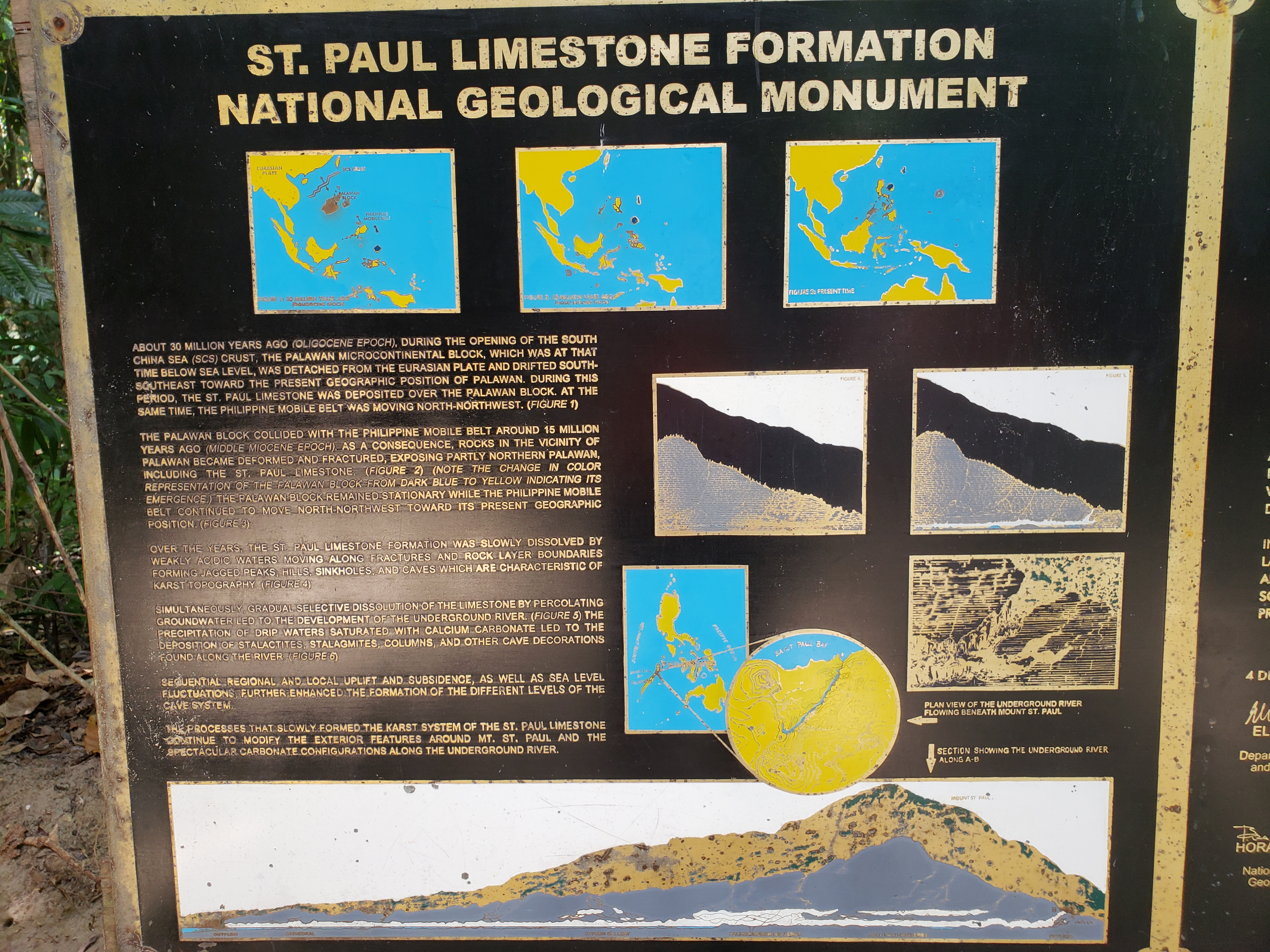
Puerto Princesa Subterranean River National Park marker describing the geologic history of the Philippines

In the geology of the Philippines, the Philippine Mobile Belt is a complex portion of the tectonic boundary between the Eurasian plate and the Philippine Sea plate, comprising most of the Philippine archipelago. It includes two subduction zones, the Manila Trench to the west and the Philippine Trench to the east, as well as the Philippine fault system. Within the Belt, a number of crustal blocks or microplates which have been shorn off the adjoining major plates are undergoing massive deformation.

Most segments of the Philippines, including northern Luzon, are part of the Philippine Mobile Belt, which is bounded by the Philippine Sea plate to the east, the Molucca Sea Collision Zone to the south, Sunda plate to the southwest, and the South China Sea Basin to the west and north-west. To the north it ends in eastern Taiwan, the zone of active collision between the North Luzon Trough portion of the Luzon Volcanic Arc and South China. The Philippine Mobile Belt has also been called the Philippine Microplate and the Taiwan–Luzon–Mindoro Belt.

== Boundaries ==
The Philippine Mobile Belt is bounded on the west by the Manila Trench and its associates the Negros Trench and the Cotabato Trench, which subducts the Sunda plate under the Philippine Mobile Belt. To the east is the Philippine Trench and its northern associate, the East Luzon Trench which subducts Philippine Sea plate the Philippine Mobile Belt. The continuity of the Philippine-East Luzon Trench is interrupted and displaced by Benham Plateau on the Philippine Sea plate, which collided and is still colliding with the Sierra Madre of eastern Luzon.

To the north the Philippine Mobile Belt ends in Taiwan, where accreted portions of the Luzon Arc and Luzon forearc form the eastern Coastal Range and the inland Longitudinal Valley of Taiwan, respectively.

To the south the Philippine Mobile Belt terminates in the Molucca Sea Collision Zone, which is itself part of the elongated zone of convergence extending north through the Philippines into Taiwan. Within the Molucca Sea Collision Zone, the Molucca Sea plate has been totally subsumed by the arc-arc collision of the Halmahera Arc and the Sangihe Arc of eastern Indonesia.

=== Regional geology ===
The belt's basement rock complex consists of oceanic crust from the Philippine Sea plate, including ophiolites in North Luzon, or continental crust from the Sunda plate. On top of which are Cretaceous to Quaternary magmatic arcs. These magmatic arcs are exposed in the western Central Cordillera, and the northern Sierra Madre. The Cagayan River Basin is an intra-arc rift. Subduction of Late Oligocene to Early Miocene South China sea oceanic crust occurs at the Manila Trench. Subduction of Eocene Philippine Sea oceanic crust occurs at the East Luzon Trough – Philippine Trench system. The strike-slip, left lateral fault, Philippine fault system is associated with the northward movement of the belt.

=== Collision zones ===
- Taiwan: Continent-Arc Collision – 400 km-long island dominated by mountain ranges. Represents an active orogenic belt resulting from the collision of the western edge of the Philippine Sea plate where the Luzon arc has developed, with the continental margin of Eurasia. Start of collision is associated with the kinematic reorganization of the Philippine Sea plate 4 Ma (Pliocene) involving a change in the direction of its movement from a northerly to a northwesterly motion.
- Mindoro-Panay: Arc-Continent Collision – Southern termination of the Manila Trench. North Palawan Block enters into collision with the central portion of the Philippine Mobile Belt within Miocene times after cessation of the accretion of South China Sea oceanic crust between 32 and 17 Ma (Oligocene – Miocene).
- Moluccas Sea: Arc-Arc Collision – South of Mindanao Island in the Moluccas Sea. Subducting into 2 directions: to the East and to the West. This double-vergent subduction causes consequently the convergence/collision of the 2 corresponding active volcanic arcs. Start of collision in Upper Miocene. Corresponding arcs, the Sangihe and Halmahera, are presently separated by at least 100 km.

=== Palawan and Sulu ===
Palawan with the Calamian Islands and the Sulu Archipelago with the Zamboanga Peninsula of western Mindanao are the tops of two protruding north-eastern arms of the Sunda plate. They are not part of the Philippine Mobile Belt but are in collision with it. The Sulu Trench marks the boundary of the Sulu micro-block with the Sulu Sea basin and the Palawan micro-block. The inactive Palawan Trench marks the subduction boundary between the Palawan microblock and the Spratly Islands plateau of the South China Sea basin. The Palawan/Calamian arm was also known in 1981 as the Palawan block and Palawan microcontinent, and in 1989 as the Palawan Micro-Block.

=== Luzon ===
The island of Luzon is bisected by the braided N–S trending Philippine fault system. Luzon is not bisected E-W, and illustrations showing anything similar are erroneous. Northern Luzon is integral with southern Luzon. Any suggestion that Northern Luzon is not part of the Philippine Mobile Belt is not borne out by the detailed fault mapping of Pinet and Stephan (1989), and others. A common tectonic plate illustration for the Philippines is incorrect in this regard.

== Collage of 16 principal blocks ==
The composition of the Philippine Mobile Belt is generally interpreted as a collage of a large variety of blocks or terrane of diverse origin amalgamated before collision with the Eurasian margin. Six principal blocks have been identified in Luzon: the Sierra Madre Oriental, Angat, Zambales, Central Cordillera of Luzon, Bicol and Catanduanes Island blocks. In the Central Philippines four principal blocks have been identified: Panay, Mindoro, Cebu and Bohol. In Mindanao six principal blocks have been identified: Pacific Cordillera, Surigao, Pujada peninsular, Central Cordillera of Mindanao, Daguma range and Zamboanga.

=== Well-known micro-continental blocks ===
- North Palawan Block
- Mindoro Block

== Magmatic arcs ==
=== Ancient arcs ===
In Luzon, the Middle Oligocene to Late Miocene age of the arc is well constrained stratigraphically as well as radiometrically. Most of the intrusive rocks are dioritic in composition, although alkali rocks also occur. In the Central Cordillera of Luzon, intrusive rocks include Paleogene rocks related to an ancient arc and Neogene intrusive and volcanic rocks related to eastward subduction from the Manila Trench.

In Visayas, oldest known magmatic rocks in the Philippines are found in Cebu Island, where dioritic rocks have been dated at Lower Cretaceous (Walther and others, 1981), similar rocks have been recognized in neighboring Bohol Island.

In Mindanao, interpretation of the age of these rocks is further complicated by their petrographic diversity. Sajona and others (1993) analyzed Pliocene-Pleistocene adakitic rocks in Zamboanga Peninsula and mention a possible association with activity along the Philippine Fault in Surigao and northern Davao.

=== Active arcs ===
The distribution of Philippine Pliocene-Quaternary volcanoes generally reflects the activity along subduction zones presently bounding the archipelago.

- Five distinct volcanic belts can be defined, namely:
  - Luzon Volcanic Arc corresponding to the Manila Trench
  - East-Philippine Volcanic Arc associated with the Philippine Trench
  - Negros-Panay Arc linked to the Negros Trench
  - Sulu-Zamboanga Arc formed by the Sulu Trench
  - Cotabato Arc related to the Cotabato Trench

== Sedimentary basins ==
The archipelago has 16 sedimentary basins formed by tectonic processes. Here are the following sedimentary basins:

- Luzon
  - Bicol Shelf
  - Cagayan Valley Basin
  - Central Luzon Basin
  - Ilocos Trough
  - Mindoro–Cuyo Basin
  - East Palawan Basin
  - Northwest Palawan Basin
  - Reed Bank Basin
  - Southeast Luzon Basin
  - Southwest Palawan Basin
  - West Luzon Basin
- Visayas
  - Visayan Basin (or in Luzon)
  - West Masbate–Iloilo Basin
- Mindanao
  - Agusan–Davao Basin
  - Cotabato Basin
  - Sulu Sea Basin

== See also ==
- Subduction tectonics of the Philippines
- Back-arc basin
