= East Luzon Trough =

Oceanic trench

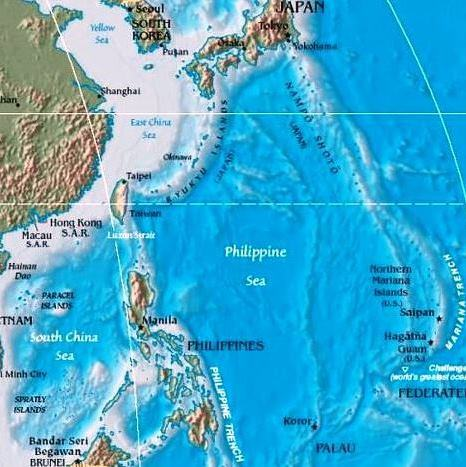
The East Luzon Trough located North of the Philippine Trench, and east of the Manila Trench and the Island of Luzon.

The East Luzon Trough (also known as the East Luzon Trench) is an oceanic trench north of the Philippine Trench and east of the island of Luzon. The trench is located near the Philippine orogeny and located in the southeastern region of the Philippine Sea Plate. The depth of the trough is 5,700 meters. The East Luzon Trough formed during the Eocene and Oligocene epoch, 40–24 million years ago.

Immediately to the South of the East Luzon Trough is the Philippine Trench. They are separated, with their continuity interrupted and displaced, by Benham Plateau on the Philippine Sea Plate.

== Geology ==
The East Luzon Trough was formed due to the subduction of the Philippine Sea Plate beneath the island of Luzon. The trench was active during the Oligocene. The Sierra Madre Basin and Isabella Ridge may represent the trench, forearc basin, and subduction complex. The rate of subduction on the Philippine Sea Plate is estimated to be around 2–3 cm per year. A transfer zone borders an estimate of 55% of the East Luzon Trough today.

The East Luzon Trough is hypothesized to be 40 to 17 million years old. The northern part of the East Luzon Trough formed during the Eocene.

The large sediments found in the East Luzon Trough are molded by fold and thrust faulting at the base of the continental slope, further the acoustic basement under the sections of sediment can be followed as it dips towards land beneath the east Luzon margin.

== Trough ==
The trench reaches a depth of 5,700 meters (18,700 feet) at its deepest point, known as Gagua Basin.

== Seismicity ==
Epicenters of large earthquakes ≥ 7.0 in the East Luzon Trough beginning from 1937, 1968 1970 1977

Although there are vast areas of subduction zones, some authors have considered this region to have low seismic activity. There has been a decent amount of earthquakes with a magnitude ≥7.0 in the region, with the most recent occurring in 1994. It hit the trench in a depth of 15.0 km. Areas adjacent to the subduction zones have experienced large seismic activity.

Significant earthquakes which are 7.0± related to the Luzon Trough:

| Year | Location | Moment Magnitude | Depth | Casualties |
|---|---|---|---|---|
| 1937 | Offshore Quezon Province, East of Tignoan | 7.5 | 15.0 km | 1 |
| 1968 | Southeast of Minuri | 7.6 | 25.0 km | 270 |
| 1970 | East north-east of Suclayin | 7.4 | 25.0 km | 15 |
| 1977 | East of Dicamay | 7.0 | 37.0 km | 1 |
