= Manila Trench =

Oceanic trench in the South China Sea, west of Luzon and Mindoro in the Philippines

Coordinates: 14°42′N 119°00′E

Epicenters of large earthquakes ≥ 6.4 M_{w} along the Manila Trench, from 1924, 1934, 1942, 1956, 1972, and 1999.

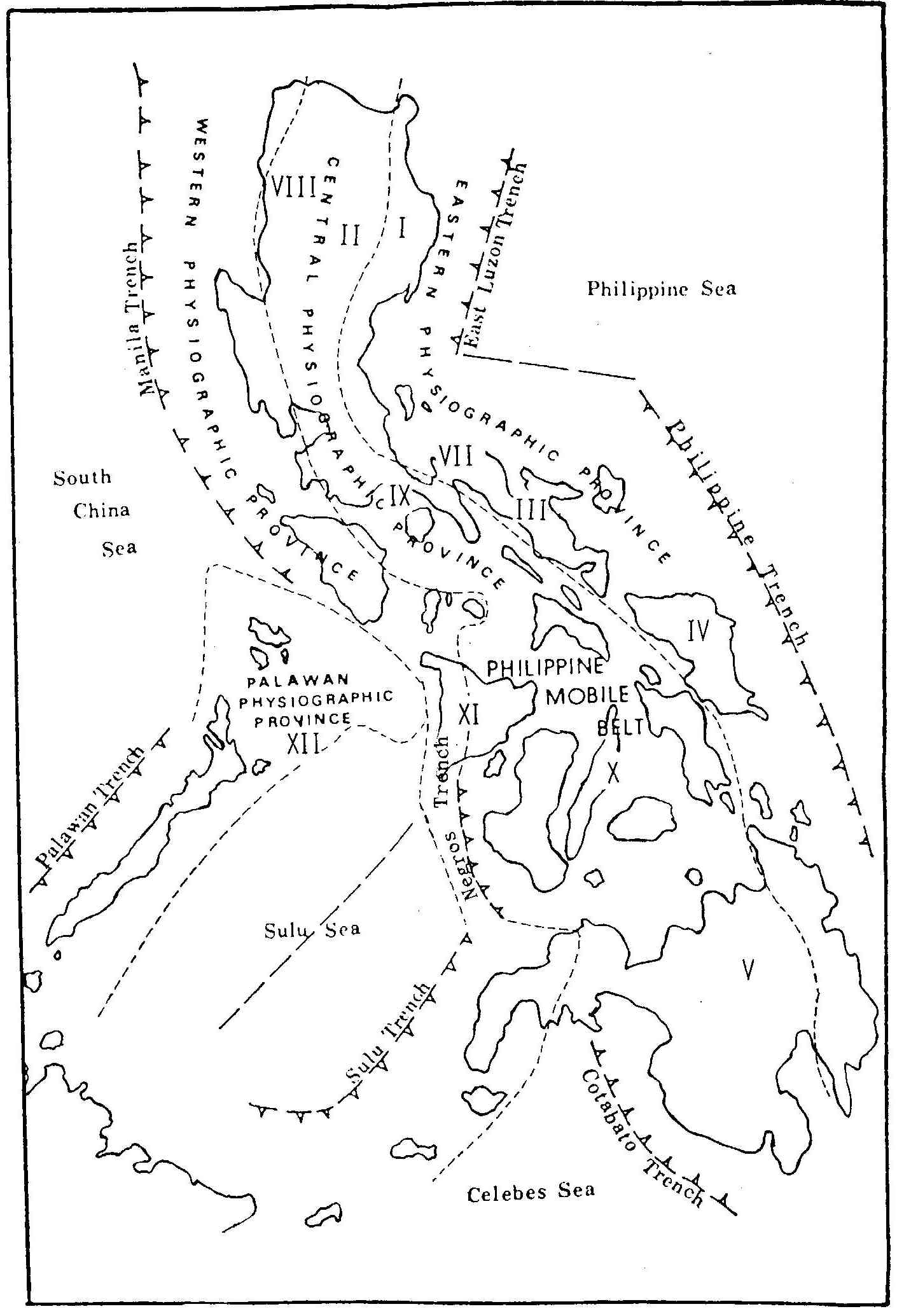
The Manila Trench near western Luzon and Mindoro, the Philippine Trench in the east, and the Philippine Mobile Belt.

The Manila Trench is an oceanic trench in the Pacific Ocean, located west of the islands of Luzon and Mindoro in the Philippines. The trench reaches a depth of about 5,400 metres (17,700 ft), in contrast with the average depth of the South China Sea of about 1,500 metres (4,900 ft). It is created by subduction, in which the Sunda Plate (part of Eurasian Plate) is subducting under the Philippine Mobile Belt, producing this almost N-S trending trench. The convergent boundary is terminated to the north by the Taiwan collision zone, and to the south by the Mindoro terrane (Sulu-Palawan block colliding with SW Luzon). It is an area pervaded by negative gravity anomalies.

The Manila Trench is associated with frequent earthquakes, and the subduction zone is responsible for the belt of volcanoes on the west side of the Philippine island of Luzon, which includes Mount Pinatubo.

Convergence between the Philippine Mobile Belt and the Sunda Plate have been estimated using GPS measurements, and this value ranges from ~ 50+ mm/yr in Taiwan, to 100 mm/yr near N. Luzon, and ~ 50 mm/yr near Zambales and ~20+mm/yr near Mindoro island. Plate locking between the Sunda Plate and Luzon is about 1% coupled, almost unlocked as determined by elastic block models, suggesting that the trench absorbs the Philippine Mobile Belt-Eurasian Plate convergence.

== Structure of the Manila Trench ==
The Manila Trench was formed by the subduction of the Eurasian Plate underneath the Philippine Sea Plate, which initiated during the Middle Miocene (22-25 million years ago). A characteristic feature of this plate boundary is the gradual change from normal subduction (on the southern margin) to a collisional regime (on the northern margin) which produces the Taiwan orogeny. The dip angle of the subducting plate also increases from south to north in the northern section of the trench.

The structure of the northern Manila Trench has been studied extensively. This region is characterized by low free-air gravity anomaly, bathymetric depression, and a change of convex to concave trench axis geometry (which is a feature unique to this location). The gravity anomaly shows that the subducted crust has a density of 2.92 g/cm^{3}, whereas the surrounding South China Sea crust has a lower density of 2.88g/cm^{3}.

Seamounts subducted under the Manila Trench have shown to produce some notable deformation features. Well-developed back-thrust faults, microfractures and gravitational collapse are found in the accretionary wedge of the Manila Trench. These features are only present proximal to subducted seamounts, and absent where there are no subducted seamounts.

The accretionary wedge of the Manila Trench broadens going north; seeing as the southern section of the margin accumulates more trench-fill sediments than the north. The trench-fill sediments are thought to be sourced from the collisional zone of the Taiwan orogeny or by gravity controlled processes. The sequence boundary ‘t0’ represents the unconformity between the hemipelagic sediments and overlying trench-fill sediments. This surface lessens in slope and decreases in thickness going from south to north along the margin. The northern part of the ‘t0’ is thought to be uplifted, explaining its decrease in slope.

The northern section of the margin is split into 3 zones representing distinct faulting types; the normal fault zone (NFZ), the proto-thrust zone (PTZ) and the thrust zone (TZ).

The NFZ has many normal faults, often covered by the trench fill sediments. This zone has thought to have been formed by the bending of the lithosphere resulting from subduction processes (causing gravity sliding and faulting).

The PTZ represents the transitional zone between the extensional and compressional environments along the Manila Trench. This region increases in compressional strength as it approaches the accretionary prism of the trench. The PTZ also displays blind thrust faults and folds (essentially buried folds and faults). It has been suggested that these thrust faults originated along preexisting normal faults. These blind thrust faults present potential danger as they are likely candidates for the causes of high-magnitude earthquakes, and in effect large-scale tsunamis.

== Manila Trench hazards ==
The potential for a tsunami event originating along the Manila trench, similar in scale to the 2004 South Asia tsunami has been forecasted. The source of this tsunami would be very proximal to the coast of Taiwan (~100 km). The earthquake causing this event has been predicted to be of magnitude 9.35 (stronger than the 9.1–9.3 magnitude 2004 Sumatra event). This massive earthquake, which would be the 2nd strongest in recent history, would have a total length of 990 km and a maximum wave height of 9.3 metres. This event would cause serious flooding, especially in Taiwan, and could affect regions up to 8.5 km inland. The predicted tsunami would reach the southern coast of Thailand in around 13 hours and reach Bangkok in 19 hours. This disaster would also affect the Philippines, Vietnam, Cambodia, Singapore, China and peninsular Malaysia. However, recent research has slightly lowered the size of the maximum possible earthquake, to around Mw 9.2.

Following an earthquake swarm in a section of the trench opposite the Philippine province of Ilocos Sur in December 2024, PHIVOLCS raised concerns about the possibility of a Mw 8.4 earthquake in the area with waves measuring up to 14.7 meters in height and reaching the coast of northern Luzon within a minimum of two minutes.

The most recent large-scale event originating from the Manila Trench was the 2006 Pingtung dual earthquakes. These 7.0 earthquakes had 8 minutes of offset and produced a 40-centimetre tsunami; which happened to be the largest tsunami experienced on the southwest Taiwan coast. The epicenter of these dual earthquakes originated on the north part of the Manila Trench.

== Significant earthquakes ==
This is a list of significant earthquakes that are related to the Manila Trench.

Year	Location	Moment magnitude	Casualties
1924	Offshore Luzon, west of Ilioilio	6.7	-
1934	Offshore Luzon, west of Cabittaogan	7.5	-
1942	Offshore Mindoro, south-southwest of Tayaman	7.4	-
1948	Offshore Luzon, west of Davila	7.0	-
1956	Offshore Mindoro, northwest of Wawa	6.7	-
1956	Offshore Luzon, west-northwest of Davila	6.4	-
1972	Luzon Strait, south-southwest of Hengchun	6.7	-
1972	Offshore Mindoro, west-southwest of Paluan	7.5	-
1985	Luzon, east-northeast of Santo Cristo	7.0	-
1987	Offshore Luzon, north of Dagupan	6.9	-
1999	Offshore Luzon, west-northwest of Bolitoc	7.1	6 dead, 40 injured
2004	Offshore Luzon, west of Talisay	6.5	-
2021	Offshore Luzon, south of Hukay	6.7	-
2022	Offshore Luzon, southeast of Mariveles, Bataan	6.4	-

== Related trenches ==
Trenches related to the Manila Trench include the Philippine Trench, East Luzon Trench, Negros Trench, Sulu Trench, and Cotabato Trench.
