= Philippine Trench =

Submarine trench to the east of the Philippines in the Pacific Ocean

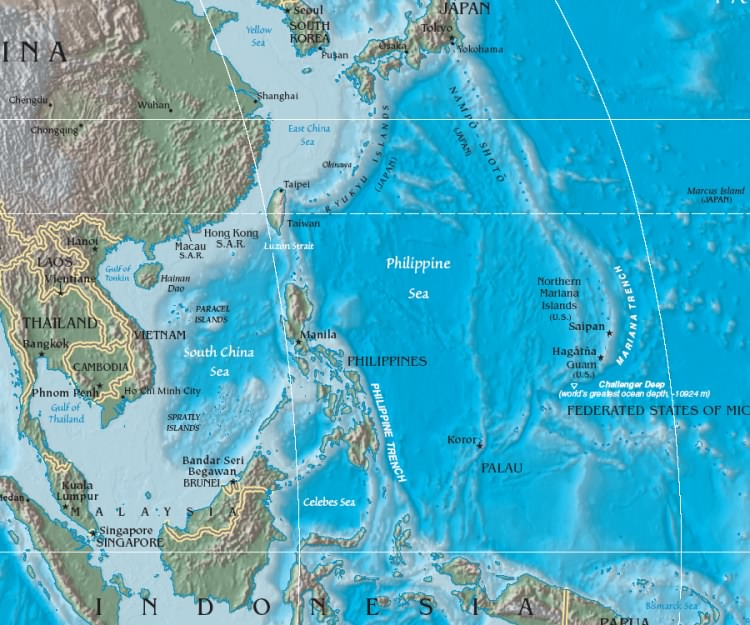
The Philippine Trench, in the middle of the picture.

The Philippine Trench (also called the Philippine Deep, Mindanao Trench, and the Mindanao Deep) is a submarine trench to the east of the Philippines. The trench is located in the Philippine sea of the western North Pacific Ocean and continues NNW-SSE. It has a length of approximately 1,320 kilometres (820 miles) and a width of about 30 km (19 mi) from the center of the Philippine island of Luzon trending southeast to the northern Maluku island of Halmahera in Indonesia. At its deepest point, the trench reaches 10,540 meters (34,580 ft or 5,760 fathoms).

A sample of 11 large earthquakes ≥ 7.2 M_{w} near the Philippine Trench within the last 100 years: in 1911, 1921, 1943, 1952, 1972, 1975, 1982, 1988, 1989, 1991, 1995, 2001, and 2012 with the last being the 2012 Samar earthquake. See also map below.

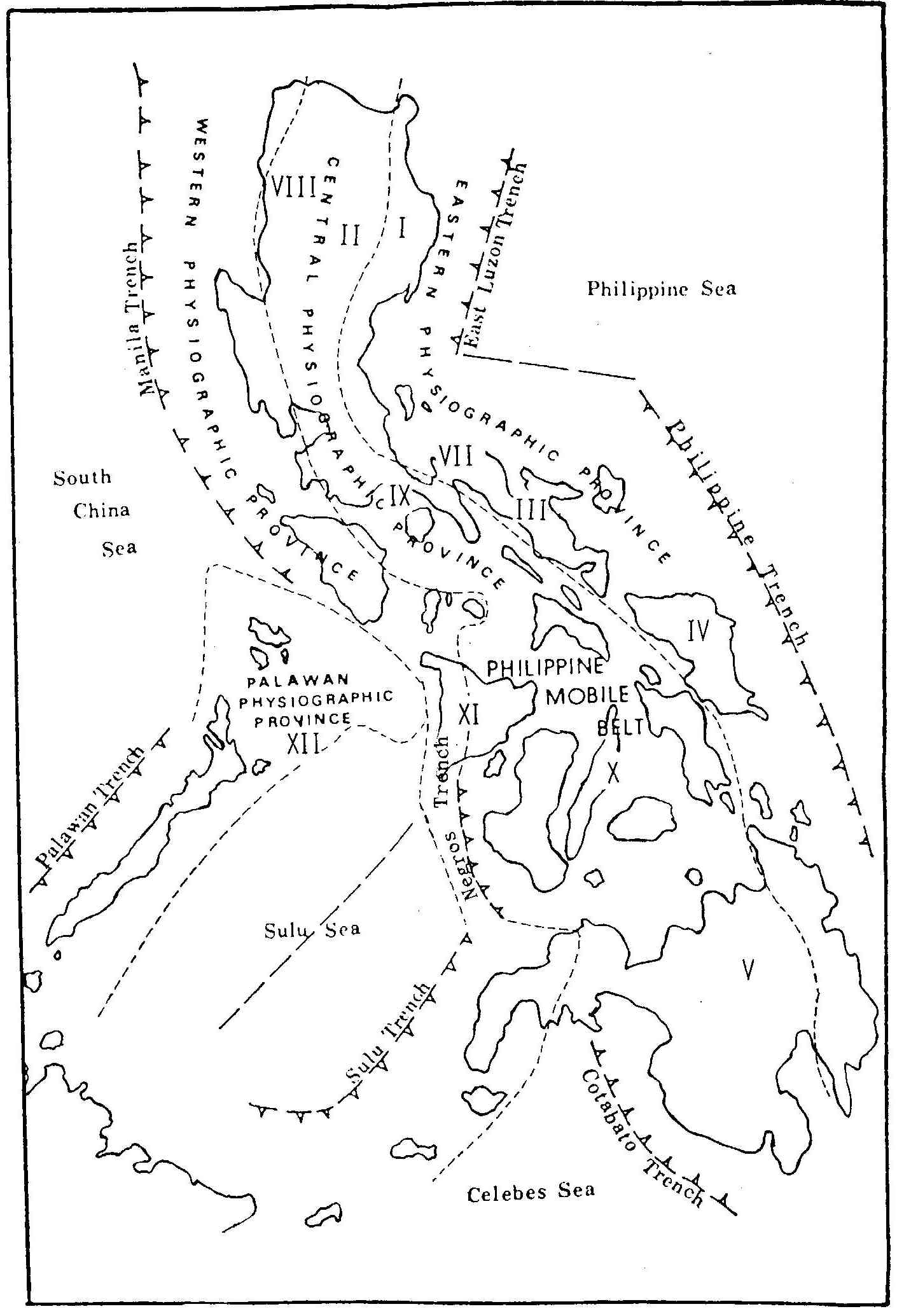
The Philippine Trench in the east which continues downward, and the Philippine Mobile Belt.

Immediately to the north of the Philippine Trench is the East Luzon Trench. They are separated, with their continuity interrupted and displaced, by Benham Rise on the Philippine Sea Plate.

== Geology ==
The Philippine trench is hypothesized to be younger than 8–9 million years old. The central part of the Philippine fault formed during the Plio-Pleistocene times is considered to be an active depression of the Earth's crust. The trench formed from a collision between the Palawan and Zamboanga plates. This caused a change in geological processes creating a subduction zone, that is dropping the ocean floor deeper. The rate of subduction on these plates is estimated to be about 15 cm per year. A convergent zone borders an estimate of 45% of the Philippine Trench today.

Although there are vast areas of subduction zones, some authors have considered this region to have low seismic activity, though the USGS has recorded many earthquakes with magnitude ≥ 7.2 in the region as shown by the map to the side. Most recently, in 2012 the Philippine Trench experienced an earthquake of M_{w} 7.6 (the 2012 Samar earthquake). It hit the trench with a hypocenter depth of 34.9 km. Areas adjacent to the subduction zones have experienced large seismic activity. In 1897, northern Samar experienced a M_{s} 7.3 earthquake while in 1924 southern Mindanao experienced one with a M_{s} 8.2.

== Depth ==
The trench reaches one of the greatest depths in the ocean. Its deepest point is known as Emden Deep and reaches 10,540 meters (34,580 ft or 5,760 fathoms).

=== Shipwrecks ===
Because the Battle off Samar occurred over the trench, the trench is home to some of the deepest known shipwrecks in the world, including the two deepest: the USS Samuel B. Roberts at 6,890 m (22,600 ft), and the USS Johnston at 6,460 m (21,190 ft).

== Sedimentation ==
Sedimentation of the Philippine trench contains slightly metamorphosed, calc-alkalic, basic, ultrabasic rock and sand grains. The southern area of the trench contains homogeneous blue clay silt and is poor in lime. Sand grains that were also found contained fresh basaltic andesite. The sediments found in the trenches are hypothesized to have been deposited by turbidity currents. A turbidity current is an underwater current that moves rapidly and carries sediment.

== Significant quakes ==
This is a list of significant quakes related to the Philippine Trench, which are 7.0+

Year	Location	Moment magnitude	Casualties
1911	offshore Mindanao, east-northeast of Barcelona	7.7	-
1921	offshore Mindanao, east of Baculin	7.4	-
1943	offshore Mindanao, east of Baculin	7.8	-
1952	offshore Mindanao, east-northeast of Cortez	7.3	-
1972	offshore Mindanao, south-east of Pondaguitan	8.0	-
1975	offshore Samar, east-northeast of Alugan	7.2	1
1982	offshore Catanduanes, southwest of Gigmoto	7.1	-
1988	offshore Catanduanes, east-southeast of Bato	7.3	-
1989	offshore Mindanao, east-northeast of Barcelona	7.6	1
1992	offshore Mindanao, south-east of Santiago	7.1; 7.5	1
1995	offshore Samar, east of Dapdap	7.2	-
2001	offshore Mindanao, south-east of Lukatan	7.5	-
2012	offshore Samar, east of Guiuan	7.6	-
2023	offshore Mindanao, north-east of Hinatuan	7.6	-
2025	offshore Mindanao, north-east of Manay	7.4	10

== Other trenches ==
Other known trenches in the Philippines are:

- Manila Trench
- East Luzon Trench
- Negros Trench
- Sulu Trench
- Cotabato Trench
