= Sunda plate =

Tectonic plate including Southeast Asia

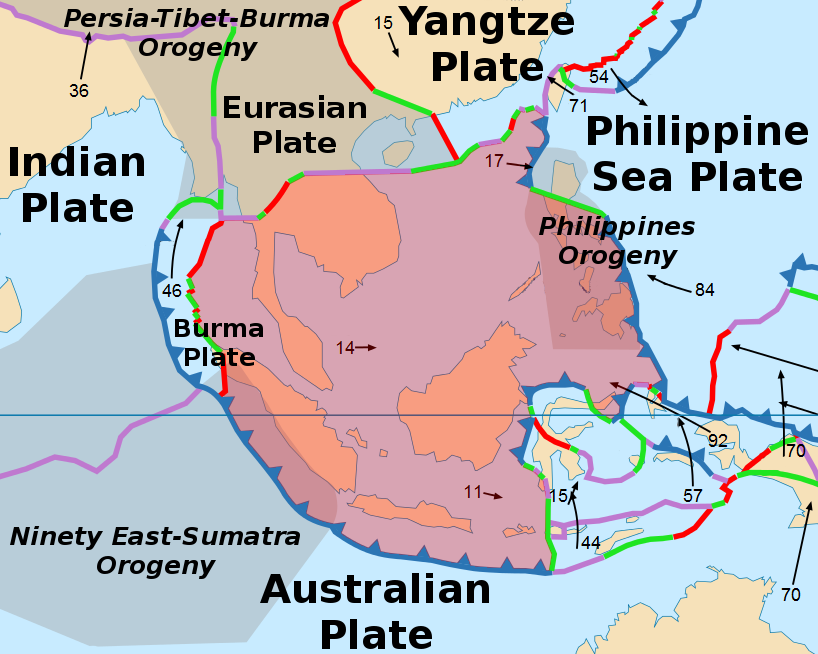
- Type: Minor
- Movement^{1}: east
- Speed^{1}: 11–14 mm/year
- Features: Mainland Southeast Asia, Borneo, Java, Sumatra, Bali, South China Sea
- ^{1}Relative to the African plate

The Sunda plate is a minor tectonic plate straddling the equator in the Eastern Hemisphere on which the majority of Southeast Asia is located.

The Sunda plate was formerly considered a part of the Eurasian plate, but the GPS measurements have confirmed its independent movement at 10 mm/yr eastward relative to Eurasia. In the PB2002 plate model it covers about 0.220 steradians, roughly 8.9×10^{6} km^{2} (3.4×10^{6} sq mi).

== Extent ==
The Sunda plate includes the South China Sea, the Andaman Sea, southern parts of Vietnam, Myanmar, Laos and Thailand along with Malaysia, Singapore, Cambodia, southern Philippines, and the islands of Bali, Lombok, West Nusa Tenggara, Borneo, Sumatra, Java, and part of Sulawesi in Indonesia.

The Sunda is bounded in the east by the Philippine Mobile Belt, Molucca Sea Collision Zone, Molucca Sea plate, Banda Sea plate and Timor plate; to the south and west by the Australian plate; and to the north by the Burma plate, Eurasian plate; and Yangtze plate. The Indo-Australian plate dips beneath the Sunda plate along the Sunda Trench also known as Java Trench, which generates frequent earthquakes and tsunamis.

The plate margin between the lower Indo-Australian plate and the upper Sunda plate, features a unique form of subduction near the island of Timor. The subduction that occurred between the upper plate and lower plate started as oceanic plate subducting under oceanic. However, it then transitioned to continental passive margin subducting under oceanic plate. This rare phenomenon continues due to the previously subducted oceanic plate continuing to drag the continental plate under the oceanic upper plate. GPS data provides insights into the consequences of speed and direction of the colliding Indo-Australian plate and the Sunda plate. This data shows that lower Indo-Australian plate is the main driver for deformation seen in the nearby Sunda-Banda Arc system. The strain that is created within this system results in shortening, with the greatest concentration in the forearc and backarc. Active shortening is occurring within the Banda Orogen.

The eastern, southern, and western boundaries of the Sunda plate are tectonically complex and seismically active. Only the northern boundary is relatively quiescent.

== See also ==
- Kutai Basin
- List of earthquakes in Indonesia
- Sunda Arc
- Sunda Shelf
