= Philippine Sea plate =

Oceanic tectonic plate to the east of the Philippines

Coordinates: 26°N 132°E

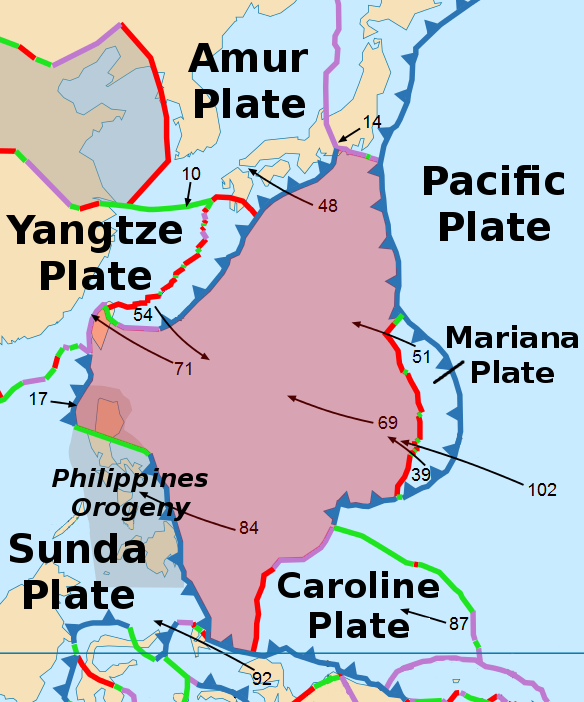
- Type: Minor
- Approximate area: 5,500,000 km^{2} (2,100,000 sq mi)
- Movement^{1}: north-west
- Speed^{1}: 48–84 mm/year
- Features: Northern Luzon, Philippine Sea, Taiwan
- ^{1}Relative to the African plate

The Philippine Sea plate or the Philippine plate is a tectonic plate comprising oceanic lithosphere that lies beneath the Philippine Sea, to the east of the Philippines. Most segments of the Philippines, including northern Luzon, are part of the Philippine Mobile Belt, which is geologically and tectonically separate from the Philippine Sea plate.

The plate is bordered mostly by convergent boundaries: To the north, the Philippine Sea plate meets the Okhotsk microplate at the Nankai Trough. The Philippine Sea plate, the Amurian plate, and the Okhotsk plate meet near Mount Fuji in Japan. The thickened crust of the Izu–Bonin–Mariana arc colliding with Japan constitutes the Izu Collision Zone. The east of the plate includes the Izu–Ogasawara (Bonin) and the Mariana Islands, forming the Izu–Bonin–Mariana Arc system. There is also a divergent boundary between the Philippine Sea plate and the small Mariana plate which carries the Mariana Islands. To the east, the Pacific plate subducts beneath the Philippine Sea plate at the Izu–Ogasawara Trench. To the south, the Philippine Sea plate is bounded by the Caroline plate and Bird's Head plate. To the west, the Philippine Sea plate subducts under the Philippine Mobile Belt at the Philippine Trench and the East Luzon Trench. (The adjacent rendition of Prof. Peter Bird's map is inaccurate in this respect.) To the northwest, the Philippine Sea plate meets Taiwan and the Nansei islands on the Okinawa plate, and southern Japan on the Amurian plate. It also meets the Yangtze plate due northwest.

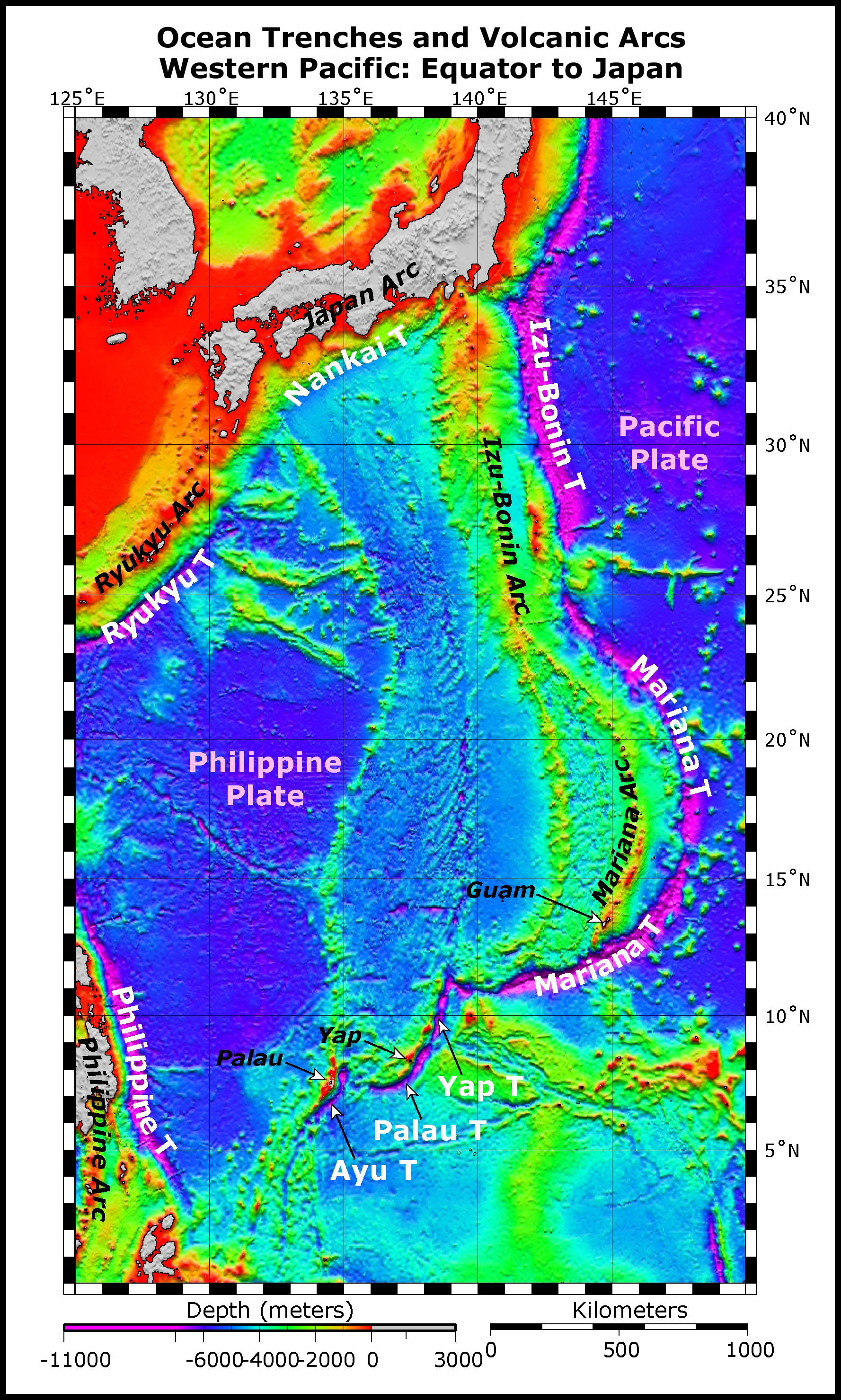
Undersea geographic features of the western Pacific

== See also ==
- List of earthquakes in Guam
- List of earthquakes in Japan
- List of earthquakes in the Philippines
