= Subduction polarity reversal =

The concept of flipping of subduction polarity

Subduction polarity reversal is a geologic process in which two converging plates switch roles: The over-lying plate becomes the down-going plate, and vice versa. There are two basic units which make up a subduction zone. This consists of an overriding plate and the subduction plate. Two plates move towards each other due to tectonic forces. The overriding plate will be on the top of the subducting plate. This type of tectonic interaction is found at many plate boundaries.

However, some geologists propose that the roles of the overriding plate and subducting plate do not remain the same indefinitely. Their roles will swap, which means the plate originally subducting beneath will become the overriding plate. This phenomenon is called subduction switch, the flipping of subduction polarity or subduction polarity reversal.

Examples of subduction systems with subduction polarity reversal are:

- Caledonides, Ireland
- Alps-Apennines, Italy
- Kamchatka, Russia
- Wetar, eastern Indonesia
- Timor, east Savu Sea
- Mediterranean
- Taiwan

== Background ==
The phenomenon of subduction polarity reversal has been identified in the collision of an intra-oceanic subduction system, which is the collision of two oceanic plates. When two oceanic plates migrate towards each other, one subducts below the other. Generally, the oceanic plate with higher density subducts beneath and the other one overrides the down-going slab. The process continues until a buoyant continental margin sitting on the top of the subducting plate is introduced into the down-going slab. The subduction of the slab becomes slower and may even cease. Geologists propose various possible models to predict what will be the next step for the intra-oceanic subduction system with the involvement of buoyant continental crust. One of the possible results is subduction polarity reversal.

== Models of subduction polarity reversal ==
Even though many geologists agree that after the involvement of buoyant continental crust, subduction polarity reversal may occur, they have different opinions towards the mechanisms leading to the change of subduction direction. Thus, there is no single model to represent subduction polarity reversal. How geologists develop the models depends on the parameters they focus on. Some geologists attempt to construct models of subduction reversal through laboratory experiments or observations. There are three common models: slab break-off, double convergence and lithospheric break-up.

The models of slab-break up and double convergence are based on observations by geologists, and the lithosphere break-up model is based on experimental simulation.

The criteria for having subduction polarity reversal are

1. Intra-oceanic subduction system with a buoyant continental plate
2. Subduction system ceases with the involvement of continental plate
3. Old slab breaks off

In addition to the criteria for the occurrence of subduction polarity reversal, some geologists have attempted to define controls of this phenomenon’s initiation. Zhang proposes that “the plastic strength and age of the overriding oceanic plate in the arc-continent collision system control the initiation modes.” When the whole overriding oceanic plate has a small plastic strength and younger oceanic plate it prefers a “spontaneous subduction polarity reversal”. This is because the lack in plastic strength allows negative buoyancy to overcome and “spontaneously initiate” subduction. while the stronger plastic strength and older oceanic plate prefers an “induced subduction polarity reversal. This is because the stronger plastic strength in the oceanic plate, the more it will resist a “spontaneous subduction”, making it necessary for a compression induced subduction polarity reversal.

Different models representing the subduction polarity reversal depends highly on parameters the Geologists considered. Here is the summary table showing the comparison models.

Difference	Slab break-off	Double convergence	Lithospheric break-up
Reasons of slab break-off	Tensile force at the old slab	Lateral sliding by the new slab	Pre-existing fault leads to penetration of new slab
Accommodation of new slab	Mantle window	A deep strike-slip movement	Penetration of new slab breaks off the old slab

=== Slab break-off ===
This model was developed by analyzing the geological cross section along the collision between Eurasian plate and the Philippine sea plate, which is the location of an ongoing flipping of subduction polarity.

When two oceanic plates migrate towards each other, one plate overrides another forming a subduction system. Later, a light and buoyant passive continental margin introduced into this system will cause the cessation of subduction system. On one hand, the buoyant plate resists subduction beneath the overriding plate. On the other hand, the dense oceanic slab at the subducting plate prefers to move downward. These opposite forces will generate a tensile force or gravitational instability on the downward slab and lead to the break-off of the slab. The space where the break-off slab separates will form a mantle window. Subsequently, the less dense continental margin forms the overriding plate, while the oceanic plate becomes the subducting slab. The direction of the subduction system changes since the break-off of slab creates the space, which is the major parameter of this model.

The evolution diagram showing how the subduction reversal initiated by a break-off slab at subducting plate: Brown colour is the less dense continental crusts; White colour is the oceanic crust; 1. Two plates move towards each other; 2. The buoyant continental crust resists to subduct; 3. Mantle window is created by gravitational instability; 4. New subducting plate develops

=== Double convergence model ===
This model is developed based on the geological evolution of Alpine and Apennine subduction.

Similarly, two oceanic plates move towards each other. The subduction process ceases with the involvement of buoyant continental block. A new slab is formed at the overriding plate owing to the regional compression and the difference in density between the continental block and oceanic plate. An orogenic wedge is built. However, there is an obvious space problem about how to accommodate two slabs. The solution is the new developing slab moves not only vertically, but also laterally leading to a deep strike-slip movement. The development of co-existence of two opposite slabs is described as a double sided subduction or doubly convergent wedge. Eventually, the development of new slab grows and slides onto the old slab. The old slab breaks off and the orogenic wedge collapses. The new slab stops the lateral motion and subducts beneath. The direction of subduction system changes.

Evolution of double convergence model: Brown colour represents the Continental plate; White colour represents the oceanic plate; C1. The plate with both continental and oceanic plate subducts beneath; 2. The continental block engage in the subduction with building orogenic wedge; 3. The new slab develops and two slabs exhibit a deep strike-slip movement (Double circle means pointing out of the screen; Cross inside the circle means pointing into the screen; 4. New slab moves further downward; 5. The old slab breaks off; 6. The new slab subducts beneath.

=== Lithosphere break-up ===
The lithosphere break-up model is simulated by hydrocarbon experiments in the laboratory. The researchers set up the setting of subduction zone which are analogized by hydrocarbons with different densities representing various layers in the subduction zone.

The initial setting of the simulated subduction zone model is confined by two pistons. The piston connected to the overriding plate is locked, while the piston linking to subducting plate is subjected to a constant rate of compression. More importantly, there is a relatively thin magmatic arc and pre-existing fault dipping towards the subducting plate at the overriding plate. The detachment of the pre-existing fault occurs when buoyant continental margin is in contact with the overriding plate. It is because the buoyant margin resists subduction and significantly increases the frictional force in the contact region. The subduction then stops. Subsequently, the new subducting slab develops at an overriding plate with the continuous compression. The new developing slab eventually penetrates and breaks the old slab. A new subduction zone is formed with an opposite polarity to the previous one.

In reality, the magmatic arc is a relatively weak zone at the overriding plate because it has a thin lithosphere and is further weakened by high heat flow and hot fluid. Pre-existing faults in this simulation are also common in the magmatic arc. This experiment is a successful analogy to subduction polarity reversal happening at Kamchatka in early Eocene and the active example at Taiwan region as well as at Timor.

A. Chemenda's Experiment setup of lithosphere break-up model: White colour indicates the oceanic plate ( Higher density); Brown colour indicates the continental plate ( Lower density);Green colour shows the pre-existing fault; The plates represented by hydrocarbons floats at the asthenosphere represented by water.

The evolution diagram showing how the subduction reversal initiated by a pre-existing fault at the overriding plate. 1: Compression pushing; 2: New slab develops with the failure of the fault; 3: New slab penetrates; 4: New slab breaks the old slab

== Taiwan as an active example of flipping of subduction reversal ==
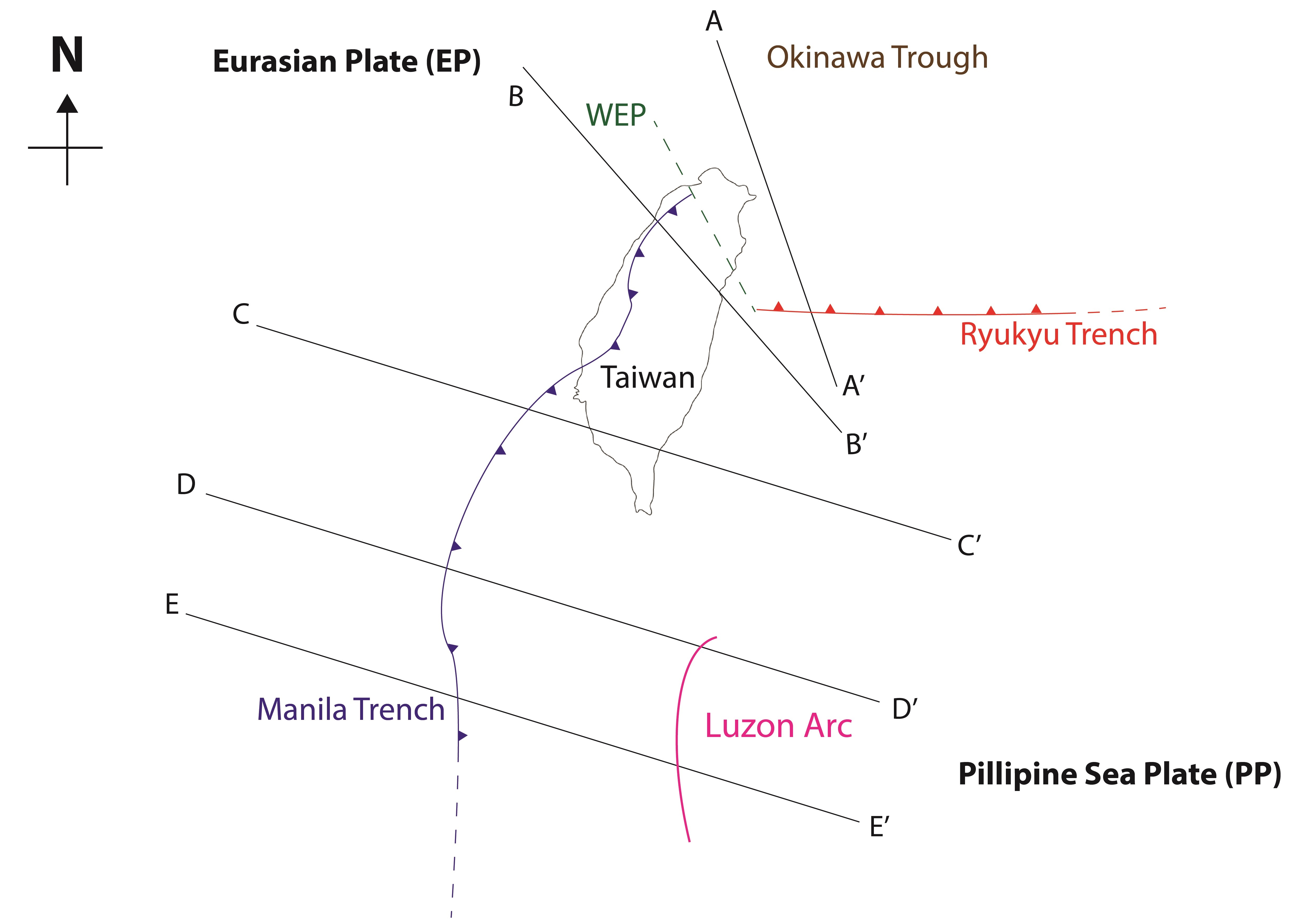
Map of Taiwan shows the location of geological cross-section and the major subuductions

A sharp contrast of landforms in Taiwan lures many people to investigate. The northern part of Taiwan has many flat plains such as Ilan Plain and Pingtung Plain, while the southern part of Taiwan is concentrated with many high mountains like Yushan reaching about 3950m. This huge difference in topography is the consequence of the flipping of subduction polarity. Most of models studying this phenomenon will focus on an active collision in Taiwan which appears to reveal the incipient stages of subduction reversal.

The collision of N- trending Luzon arc in Philippine Sea plate (PP) with E-trending Eurasian plate (EP) started at mid-Miocene forming an intra-oceanic subduction system. Taiwan was formed by this process. The south–north topographic difference in Taiwan is like a story book telling the evolution in subduction zone. The Philippine Sea plate subducts below the Eurasian plate at south-west part of WEP (Western edge of north-dipping Philippine Sea Plate), and the latter overrides the former at north east part of WEP. The collision between two plates started at the Northern Taiwan and propagated south with the younger region at the southern part. Each incipient stage of subduction reversal process could be studied by correlating cross-sections in various parts of Taiwan.

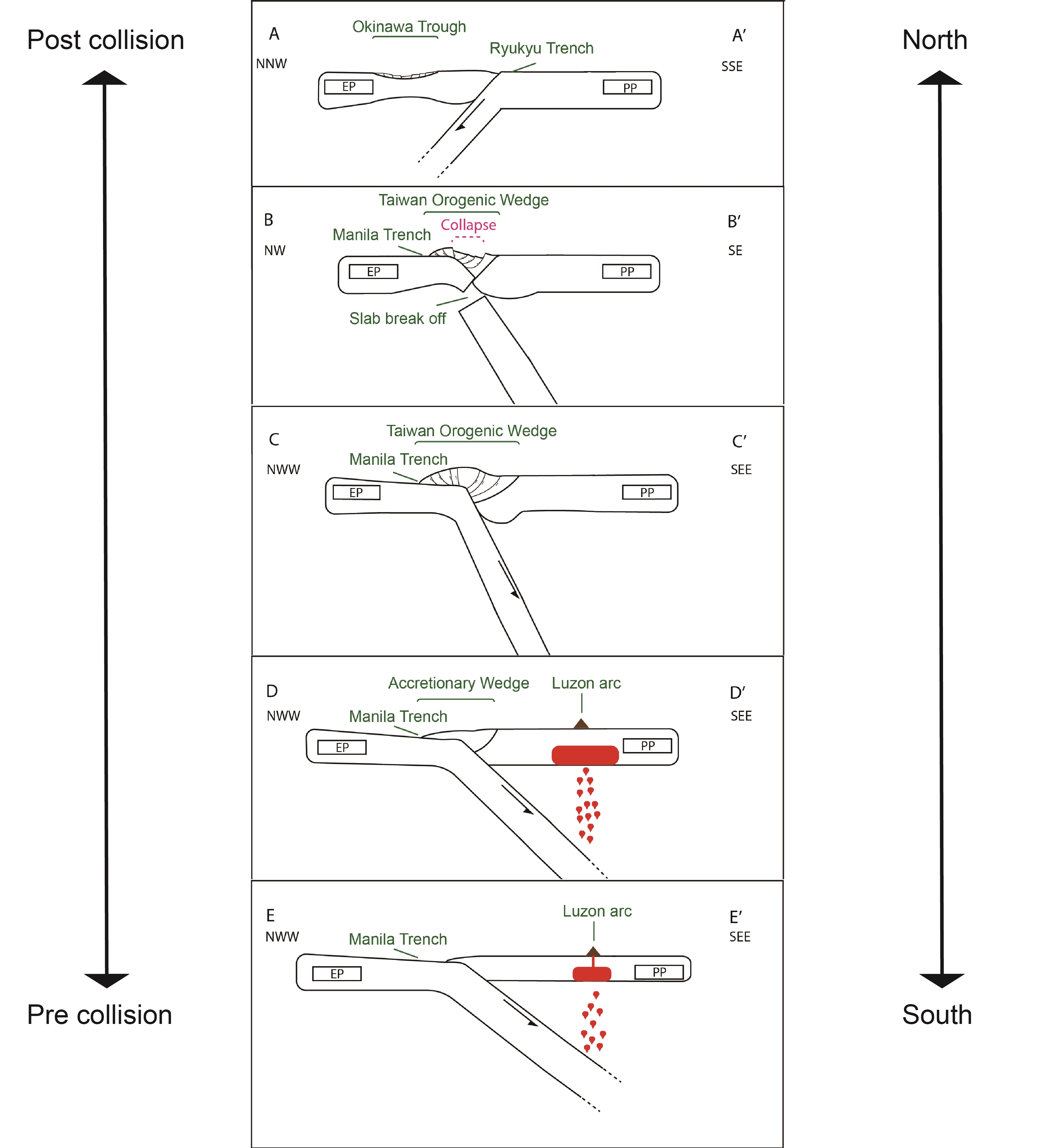
1) Cross-section A-A’ (Post-collision): The passive continental margin of Eurasian plate, a buoyant continental crust, overrides the Philippine sea plate .The Eurasian plate is undergoing lithospheric stretching, forming the Okinawa Trough. 2) Cross-section B-B’: The Philippine Sea Plate subducts beneath the Eurasian plate, and Ryukyu trench roll-back leads to the extensional collapse of Taiwan orogenic wedge. The direction of subduction changes in cross-section C-C'. 3) Cross-section C-C’: Drastic collision between two plate creates an accretionary wedge and develops orogenic belt. Taiwan orogens reached the maximum height with an equal amount of erosion and growth rate. The angle of the slab is almost 80 degrees dipping downward. 4) Cross-section D-D’: The Eurasian plate is actively subducting into the Philippine Sea plate at 80mm/year along the Manila Trench. The slab is penetrating into the mantle and the volume of melt in mantle wedge keeps increasing. Meanwhile, the angle of subduction slab is not as steep as in cross-section C-C'. The accretionary wedge was just developed. 5) Cross-section E-E’ (Pre-Collision): Slab penetrates beneath the Philippine Sea plate and brings hydrous materials to generate a mantle wedge and Luzon volcanic arc.

== See also ==
- Geology of Taiwan
- Subduction erosion
- Wilson cycle
