= Mindoro Suture Zone =

Major geological feature located in the Philippines

The Mindoro Suture Zone is a major geological feature located in the Philippines, separating the Mindoro Block from the North Palawan Block. It is a suture zone, which is a linear belt of rock that marks the boundary between two tectonic plates that have collided. The Mindoro Suture Zone is a complex zone of deformation that includes a variety of rock types, including mafic and ultramafic rocks, amphibolites, and metasediments.

== Formation ==
The Mindoro Suture Zone is a complex geological feature that formed as a result of the collision of two continental fragments: the North Palawan block and the Mindoro block. This collision occurred in the upper Paleogene and lower Neogene time (around 30-15 million years ago) as the North Palawan block moved northward relative to the Mindoro block.

The formation of the Mindoro Suture Zone was initiated by the rifting of the South China Basin in the mid-Tertiary. This rifting resulted in the separation of the North Palawan block from Eurasia and the formation of the South China Sea. The North Palawan block then began to move northward, driven by the subduction of the South China Sea plate beneath the Eurasian continent.

== Petrology ==
Petrological and geochemical investigations of the sedimentary Lasala formation in northwest Mindoro, offer new insights into the origin of this geologically contentious region. The Eocene Lasala formation overlies the Jurassic Halcon metamorphics, a regionally metamorphosed suite generally thought to have formed as a result of arc-continent collision processes.

The sedimentary formation consists mainly of sandstones and shales interbedded with mudstones, basalt flows, and subordinate limestones and conglomerates. Petrographic information on the Lasala clastic rocks demonstrates a uniform framework composition that is predominantly quartzose. Major oxide, trace element abundances, and various elemental ratios similarly impart a strongly felsic signature. These characteristics are taken to indicate a chiefly continental, passive margin derivation and deposition of the Lasala sediments during the Eocene.
