= Lichi (disambiguation) =

The term "Lichi" may refer to:

- Lichi, a genus in the soapberry family
- Lichi, Eliseo Alberto's nickname
- Lichi Formation, a palaeontological formation in Taiwan
- Lichi, a Chinese low speed electric vehicle manufacturer
