= Pekingese Dog Rock =

Rock in Lüdao, Taitung County, Taiwan

哈巴狗岩 (Chinese)
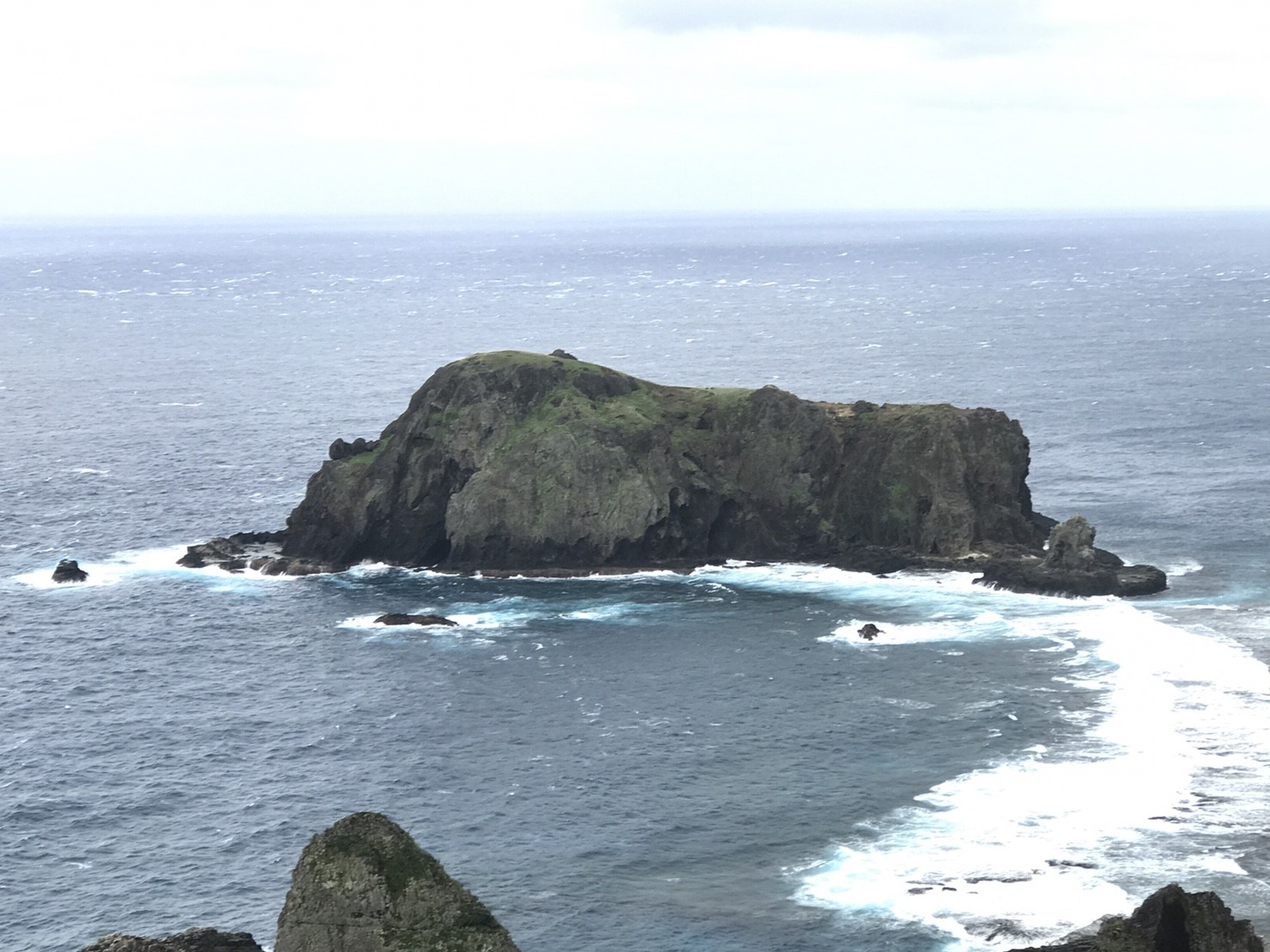

- Location within Taitung County

Geography
- Location: Lüdao, Taitung County, Taiwan
- Coordinates: 22°39′17.6″N 121°30′34.4″E

The Pekingese Dog Rock (Chinese: 哈巴狗岩; pinyin: Hǎbāgǒu Yán) is a rock in Green Island, Taitung County, Taiwan.

== History ==
The rock is a residual volcanic wall. The rock was formed slowly after different parts of the crater eroded by sea and wind over time.

== Name ==
The rock was named Pekingese Dog Rock because the shape resembles a Pekingese dog.

== See also ==
- Geology of Taiwan
