= List of stratigraphic formations in the Philippines =

The list of well-known geologic formations in the Philippines.

== Stratigraphic groupings ==
- Ilocos-Central Luzon Basin
- Luzon Central Cordillera
- Cagayan Valley Basin
- Northern Sierra Madre
- Zambales Range
- Southern Sierra Madre
- Southwest Luzon Uplands
- Southeast Luzon Basin
- Southeast Luzon Arc (Recent)
- Southeast Luzon Arc (Ancient)
- North Palawan Block
- South Palawan Block
- Antique Range
- Iloilo Basin
- Negros Arc (Ancient)
- Negros Arc (Recent)
- Visayan Sea Basin
- Samar Block
- Leyte Central Highlands
- Leyte Gulfs
- Sulu-Zamboanga Arc
- Central Mindanao Arc
- Agusan-Davao Basin
- Mindanao Pacific Cordillera
- Daguma Range
- Cotabato Basin
- Saranggani Block
- Pujada Block
- South China Sea Basin
- Sulu Sea Basin
- Celebes Sea Basin
- Philippine Sea Basin
