= Mindoro Block =

Microcontinental block in the Philippine Mobile Belt

The Mindoro block is a microcontinental block located in the Philippine Mobile Belt and the east side of North Palawan Block. It has comprises a metamorphic basement (Mindoro Metamorphics of Teves, 1953) of unknown but probably pre-late cretaceous age, overlain locally by upper cretaceous basalts (Karig, 1983), and more regionally succeeded by a probable upper eocene sequence of basinal clastic rocks, plus local basalt intercalations and carbonates. These rocks are exposed over a broad area of northern and west-central Mindoro as well as on the Lubang Islands in Verde Island Passage. The Mindoro block is bounded on the west by the Mindoro Suture Zone, and on the north by the Verde Passage Suture (Karig, 1983), which separates it from the Zambales Ophiolite terrane of Luzon. The eastern terrane boundary may be the East Mindoro Fault Zone, a probable transcurrent boundary that has not yet been studied, but which displays evidence of recent activity (Karig, 1983). Late Miocene and Pliocene basinal clastic strata lie east of this fault zone (Metal Mining Agency, 1982), but it is not known if subjacent rocks are related to rocks of the Mindoro block, or if they are part of a third terrane on Mindoro.

== Geology ==
The Mindoro block has two division located in the island of Mindoro: the Northeast Mindoro (see the list of stratigraphic formations in North Palawan Block) and the Southwest Mindoro. In Southwest Mindoro comprises 11 geologic formations namely Mansalay Formation (sandstone, shale, siltstone, minor limestone, conglomerate), Agbahag Conglomerate, Caguray Formation (mudstone, siltstone, shale, sandstone, conglomerate, limestone), Bugtong Formation (limestone, siltstone, sandstone, conglomerate, agglomerate), Tangon Formation (shale, sandstone), Napisian Formation (shale, sandstone, coal beds, conglomerate, limestone), Pocanil Formation (limestone, shale, siltstone, sandstone, conglomerate), Punso Conglomerate (conglomerate, sandstone, mudstone, shale), Famnoan Formation (conglomerate, sandstone, shale, limestone), Balanga Formation (sandstone, limestone; minor mudstone and conglomerate), and Oreng Formation (limestone, conglomerate).

== See also ==
- Mindoro Suture Zone
