= Geology of Taiwan =

External image
- Geology Map of Taiwan

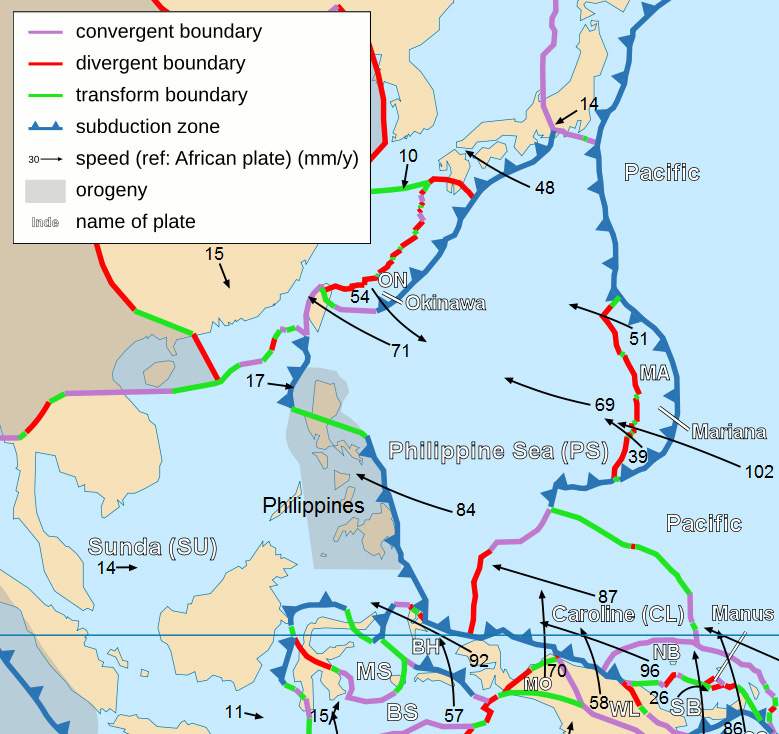
Taiwan lies on the western edge of the Philippine Plate.

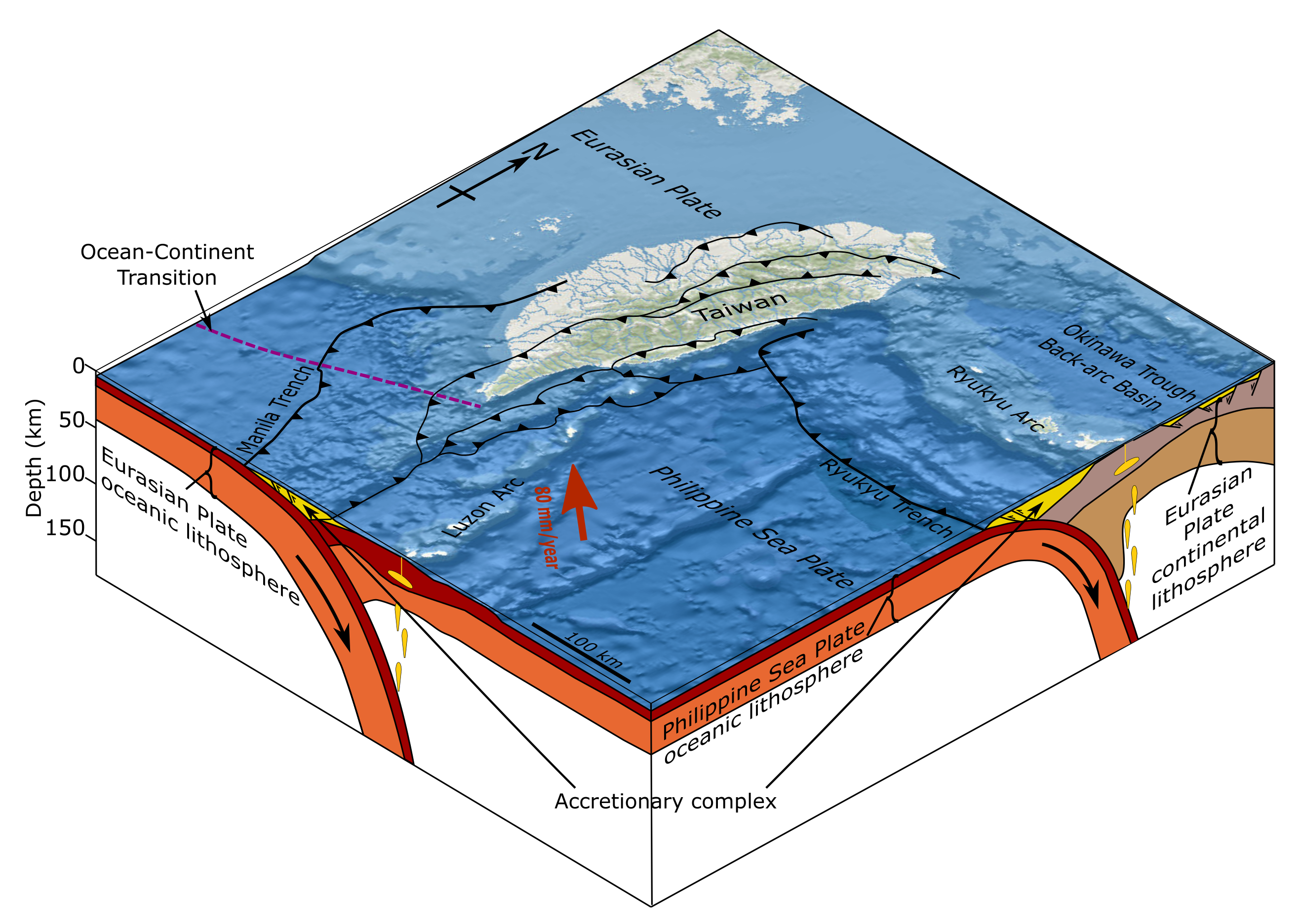
3D block diagram showing the tectonic setting of Taiwan

The island of Taiwan was formed approximately 4 to 5 million years ago at a convergent boundary between the Philippine Sea Plate and the Eurasian Plate. In a boundary running the length of the island and continuing southwards, oceanic crust of the Eurasian Plate is sliding under the Philippine Sea Plate whereas in the northeast of the island, the Philippine Sea Plate slides under continental crust of the Eurasian Plate (see 3D block diagram below). Most of the island comprises a huge fault block tilted to the west.

The island is active geologically, formed on a complex convergent boundary between the Yangtze Subplate of the Eurasian Plate to the west and north, the Okinawa Plate on the north-east, the Philippine Sea Plate on the east and south, and the Sunda Plate to the southwest. Subduction changes direction at Taiwan. The upper part of the crust on the island is primarily made up of a series of terranes, mostly old island arcs which have been forced together by the collision of the forerunners of the Eurasian Plate and the Philippine Sea Plate, which is moving to the northwest. These have been further uplifted as a result of the detachment of a portion of the Eurasian Plate as it was subducted beneath remnants of the Philippine Sea Plate, a process which left the crust under Taiwan more buoyant.

South of Taiwan, the Sunda Plate is subducting under the Philippine Sea Plate, forming the Luzon Volcanic Arc (including Green Island and Orchid Island). The east and south of the island are a complex system of belts formed by, and part of the zone of, active collision between the North Luzon Trough portion of the Luzon Volcanic Arc and the Eurasian Plate, where accreted portions of the Luzon Arc and Luzon forearc form the eastern Coastal Range and parallel inland Taitung Longitudinal Valley of Taiwan respectively.

From the northeast of Taiwan and continuing eastwards in the Ryukyu Volcanic Arc, the Philippine Sea Plate is subducting under the Okinawa Plate, forming the Ryukyu Volcanic Arc.

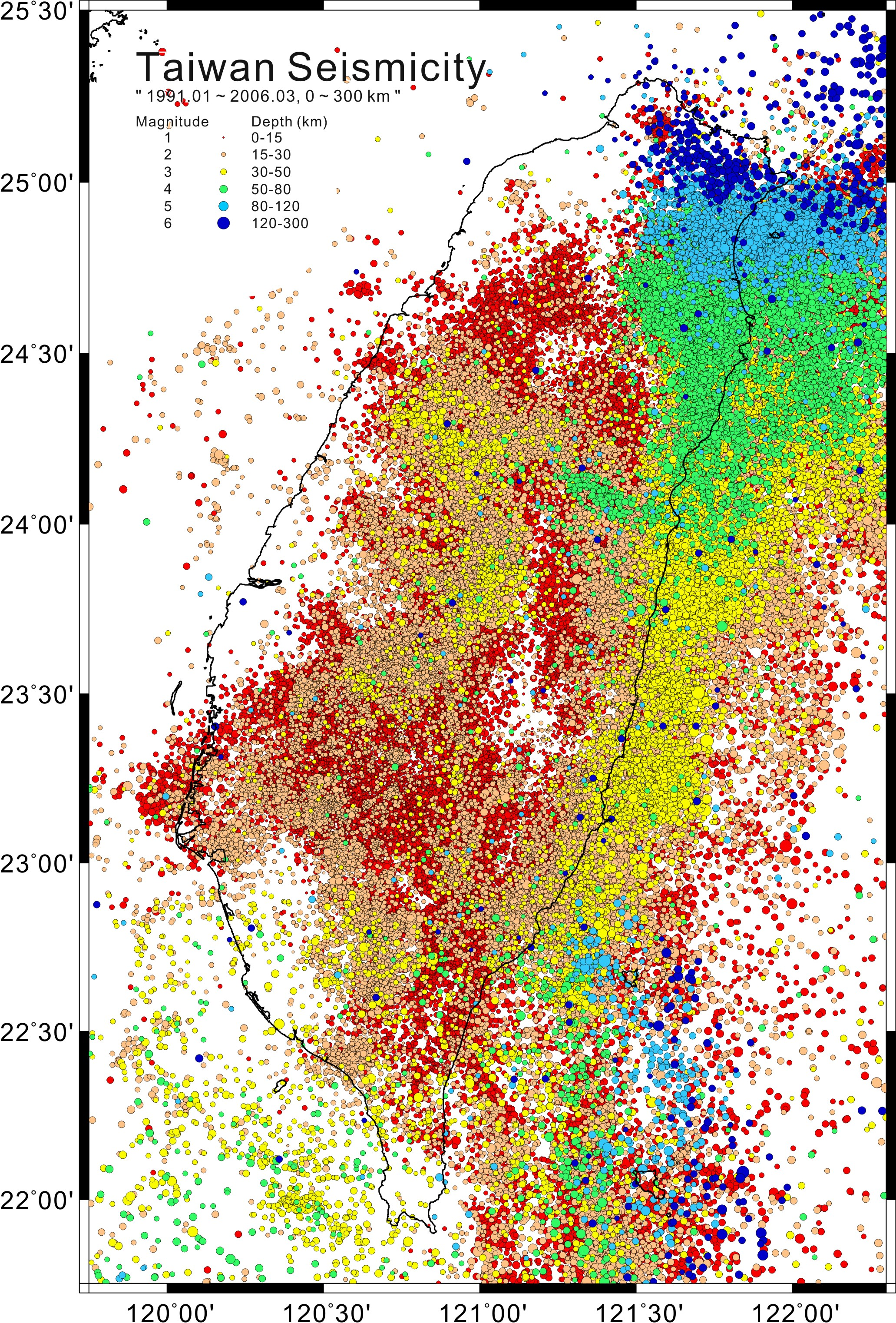
Taiwan seismicity, showing both magnitude and depth of earthquakes.

== Terranes ==
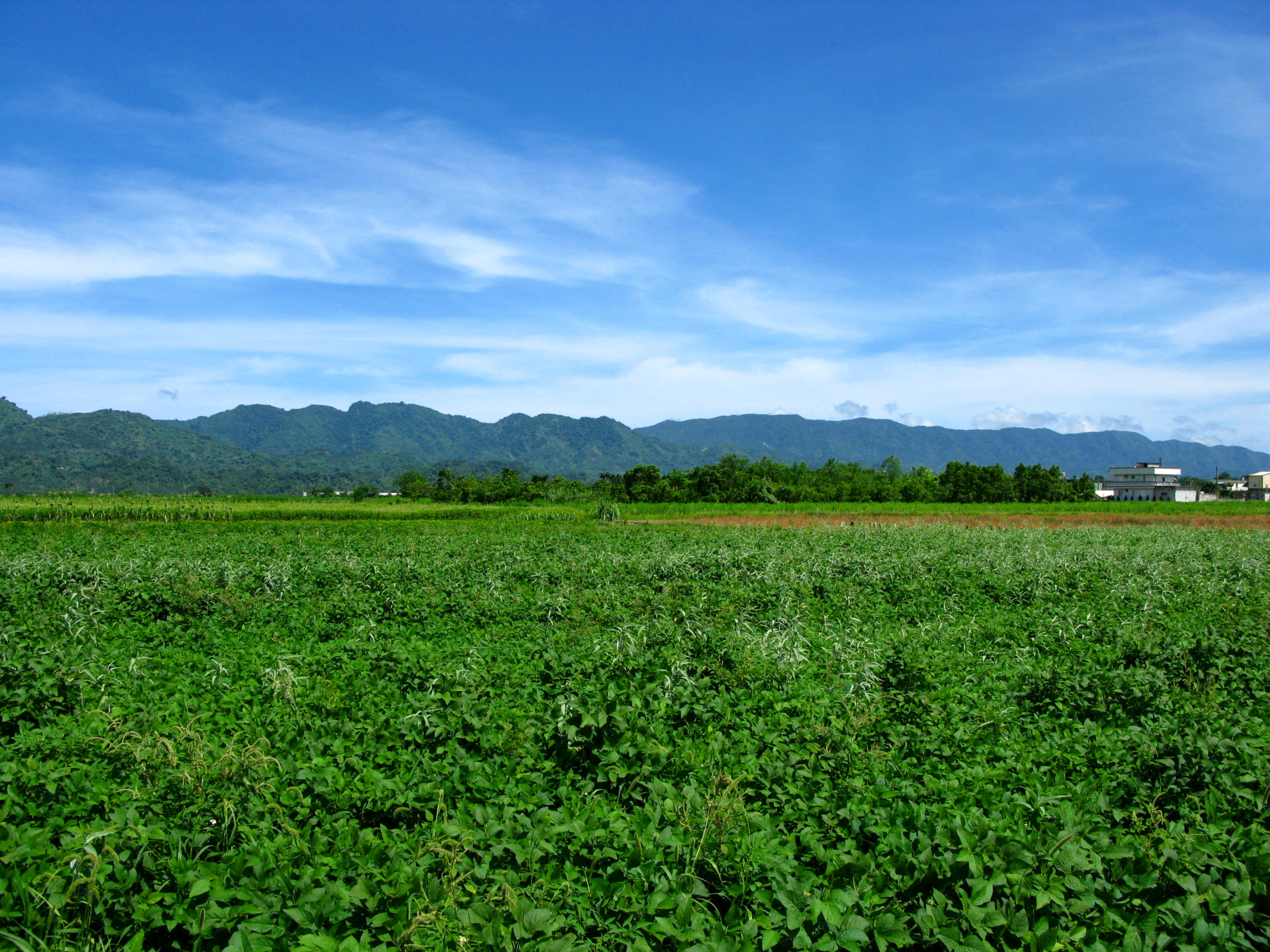
Hai'an Range

The Hai'an Range or Coastal Range terrane belongs to the Luzon Volcanic Arc (呂宋島火山弧), and is on the Philippine Sea Plate (菲律賓海板塊). West of this is the Longitudinal Valley or Huatung Valley, an active depositional zone in a rift valley. West of this is the Eastern Central Range terrane, part of the continental base that has been upturned. The western side of the range is the Western Central Range terrane, which is metamorphosed earlier Tertiary clastic sediments. The Lishan Fault separates the Hsuehshan Range terrane Eocene to Oligocene sandstone and shale. The Chukou Fault (觸口斷層) provides the boundary for the Western Foothills terrane, which is shallow marine detritus from Miocene to Pleistocene. A deformation front forms the boundary with the undeformed coastal plains alluvium, which is still depositing.

The Eastern Central Range terrane can be divided into the Tailuko belt on the west with greenschist metamorphism and the Yuli belt on the east with blueschist metamorphism. The two metamorphic belts are possibly separated by a fault called Shoufeng fault, but this is unproven.

== Central Mountains ==
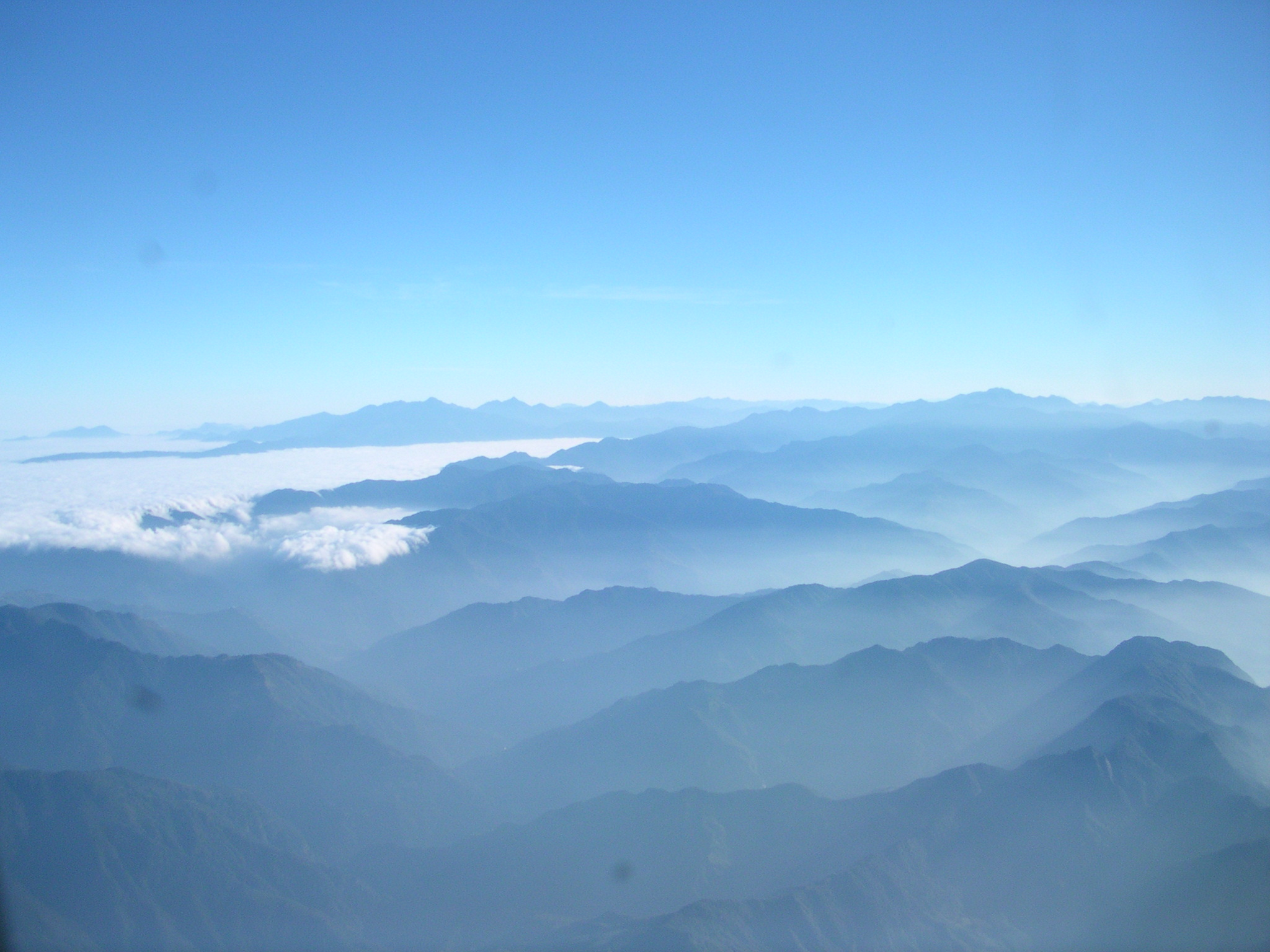
Central Mountain Range

The oldest exposed rocks are heavily metamorphosed and found in the Central Mountains. Poor quality fossil evidence suggests an origin in the Permian Period. They form a band of rock from Nan'ao in the north to inland of Jinfeng on the eastern flank of the Central Mountain Range. The band is 30 km wide in the north and narrows to the south. These earlier rocks are heavily metamorphosed. They also occur as a basement beneath the western part of the island. They make up the Danana'ao Group or Tananao Schist. This group consists of the Kainanagang Gneiss, Tailuge Marble, and Changchun Schist.

The Yuli Schist is Cretaceous in age and consists of black schist and some greenschist, glaucophane schist, and spotted slate. It is the easternmost part and extends from Chian southwards to the west of the Chihpen hot springs in a belt about 150 km long. Although the dark colour of the black schist is due to carbon, carbon is less than 2% of the content. The minerals found are quartz, mica, chlorite, albite, sphene, and graphite.

The Changchun Schist being mostly greenschist is found on the western side and forms thick beds. It is found along with smaller amounts of chert, and black schist. The rock is foliated dark green rock containing chlorite, epidote, quartz, calcite, biotite, albite and actinolite. They are derived from mafic volcanic rocks. These rocks can host copper sulfide ores.

Siliceous schists are coloured grey, they are metamorphosed sandstone, rich in quartz. Quartzite and chert bands can be found, and they are commonly associated with the black schist.

The Chiuchu Formation or Tailuge Marble forms a band from Tailuko in the north to a point between Wulu and Kuanshan in the south. The limestone is mined in quarries south of Suao for cement manufacture. Although the colour is usually a shade of grey, there are also black or white limestone, which is chopped into blocks for building purposes. dolomite is also found along with the limestone particularly at Chingchangshan, Hopingchi, and Mukuashan.

The Kainangan Gneiss or Kanagan Formation occurs in several elongated bodies. The gneiss derived from sedimentary rocks contains coarse grained quartz, biotite, and albitic plagioclase. There is also orthogneiss derived from granite. This is light grey and contains sodic plagioclase, quartz, biotite, and muscovite. Within the gneiss there are pegmatite dikes containing quartz, feldspar and mica.

Other igneous rocks found in the old metamorphic belt are amphibolite and dolerite dikes. Serpentinite is found 5 km west of Fengtien (奉天). It contains exploited deposits of nephrite, talc and asbestos. Wanjung Station (萬榮) is close to more outcrops of serpentenite. Tamayenshan block northwest of Juisui (瑞穗) and the Tsenghuanshan block 10 km west of Juisui are significant ultramafic outcrops.

Green serpentinite from near Yuli makes a good quality building stone. A band of ultramafic rocks extends for 25 km north of Litao, Taitung (離島).

The area was subjected to the Nanao Orogeny around 85 Ma which involved the granite intrusion and regional metamorphism. Rifting that opened the South China Sea around 40 Ma may be connected with some dolerite intrusions. The Penglai Orogeny started about 10 Ma and continues at the present time.

== Eastern stratigraphic region ==
The most recently added part of the island is the Coastal Range on the east coast from Taitung City in the south to Hualien City in the north. The range is the continuation of the Luzon arc. The age is Neogene and the rock consist of melange and volcaniclastics. The rock units are firstly Chimei Volcanics Miocene andesite. Next is the Tuluanshan Formation, consisting of tuff, then Takangou Formation, consisting of sediments such as shale and sandstone that contain volcanic particles. The Lichi Formation consists of melange. It is made of mud containing blocks of other stone such as sandstone and ophiolite. It is found on the southern half of the west side of the Coastal range. When this erodes, badlands are formed. Because it is a mixture of stone, the Lichi Formation is hard to date, but is likely to be from Pliocene.

The Pinanshan conglomerate is found on Pinanshan Hill and along the Pinantachi stream north of Taitung (台東). The constituents are 5–15 cm cobbles erodes by freshwater from the Central Range. It formed somewhere from middle to late Pleistocene, and indicates the plate collision had taken place.

The Milun Conglomerate is to the north of Hualien. This has also gone under the names of Beiron Conglomerate Formation and Milunpi Conglomerate. It is tilted at 30°. It is undated but is likely from Pleistocene.

== Central Mountains strata ==
Shibachongxi Formation is from the Eocene consisting of slate and then beds of metamorphosed sandstone. The total thickness is up to 1000 m.

Dajian Formation consists of sandstone from the upper Eocene, up to 2700 meters thick.

Xichun Formation slate and phyllite is from the lower Oligocene. The thickness is from 0.6 to 3 km.

Siling Formation coarse sandstone in thick beds is from the Oligocene.

Shuichungliu Formation form the Oligocene contains argillaceous slate and graywacke.

Bilushan Formation contains slate and phyllite from the Eocene.

Lushan Formation from the Miocene contains shale slate and sandstone.

Aodi Formation contemporary

Sule Formation slate and sandstone from the later Miocene.

== Western stratigraphic region ==
The west part of the island exposes deformed and metamorphosed Cenozoic sediments, overlaid by Quaternary piedmont region in the flat plains on the west coast.

Cretaceous, Paleocene and Eocene deposits are not exposed on the surface, but are buried. They have been discovered by drilling.

The Yunlin Formation is from the Cretaceous and only known from boreholes. The rocks are siltstone, basalt, shale and limestone.

The Paleocene Wangong Formation consisting of volcaniclastics, sandstone, shale and limestone is over 1046 meters thick.

In the Eocene the Shuangji Formation formed mostly from volcanic particles in the form of tuff and tuffaceous sandstone. These beds are from 100 m to 3 km thick.

In the Oligocene the Wuzhishan Formation or Wuchihshan Formation (五指山組) formed thick beds of sandstone. The total thickness is 0.9 to 1.2 km.

The Yeliu Group from the Miocene is fine grained sandstone, with some beds of shale, basaltic tuff and three seams of coal. Possibly including Wushan Formation, Piling Shale, Peiliao Formation, Talu shale, Shihti Formation, Kuanyiongshan sandstone.

The Ruifang Group contains beds of sandstone, siltstone, shale and six thin coal beds. These beds are 0.8 to 1.6 km thick.

The Sangxia Group starts with medium grained sandstone, but in the upper layers increases shale. Eight thin coal seams are included. The total thickness of the deepest beds exceeds 5 km. This includes the Kueichulin Formation with the Yutengping Sandstone, Shihliufen Shale, Kuantaoshan Sandstone; the Nanchuang Formation including Shangfuchi Sandstone and Tungkeng Formation.

The Jinshui Formation or Chinshui Formation from the Pliocene is mostly shale interbedded with some mudstone and sandstone is between 80 and 400 m thick.

The Zhuolan Formation or Cholan Formation (卓蘭層) starts in the Pliocene and extends into the first stage of the Pleistocene. It consists of fine grained sandstone. This is 1.5 to 2.5 km thick. At the same time on the southern tip of the island, the Kending Formation or Kenting Formation (墾丁組) was formed consisting of mudstone with ophiolite melange. The ophiolite melange contains pebbles and blocks of Miocene age consisting of basic and ultrabasic rock from the ocean floor. The interpretation is that a wedge of seafloor was pushed above sea level, eroded and dropped fragments into the mud.

The Toukoshan Formation (Toukeshan) (頭嵙山層) commenced with fine sandstone with thin beds of conglomerate, and continued into mainly conglomerate with sandstone beds. This was formed in stage 1 and 2 of the Pleistocene. It is from 0.4 to 3 km thick.

The Szekou Formation is a light bluish gray siltstone, with shale and fine grained sandstone. The Maanshan Formation is very similar. It is overlain by Hengchun Limestone and may interfinger.

== Western piedmont region ==
The Hengchun Limestone was formed after the Penglai movement in the third Pleistocene stage. Also at this time laterite (紅土) and gravel on river terraces was formed. Holocene mud sand and coral form a wide belt on the west side of the island.

== Volcanic rocks ==
External image
- Volcanic Distribution Map

The Tatun Volcanic Group is found on the northern tip of Taiwan. Chihsingshan is the highest point of the volcanoes at 1120 meters. The volcanoes have formed the rounded shape of the northern cape of Taiwan. The volcanic rock also occur on Huaping Isle, Mienhua Isle, Pengchia Isle and Huangwei Isle just to the north of Taiwan. The rocks are aluminium rich andesite, tuff and breccia. The rocks are poor in sodium and magnesium, but rich in iron, potassium, rubidium and strontium and strong in rare earth elements. The magma was derived by melting of the underthrust sea plate behind the Ryukyu Volcanic Arc during the Pleistocene.

The Caolingshan Basalt consists of olivine and pyroxene, with crystals of biotite and plagioclase. This is rich in K, Rb, Mg, Sr, Cr, and Ni, but poor in Na, Al, and Fe. Rare earth elements are strongly enriched. The magma was derived by deep mantle melting of the underthrust sea plate behind the Ryukyu Volcanic Arc during the Pleistocene.

The volcanoes on Chilungshan, Penshan, Caoshan, Chilung Island (Keelung Islet) and Gueishan Island date from the Pleistocene period and later. The eruption were explosive tholeiitic andesite and dacite. The main mineral is calcium rich plagioclase. The magma source is the western extremity of the Ryukyu Volcanic Arc formed when the subducting Philippine Sea Plate was compressed below the edge of the Eurasian Plate at about 20 to 30 km deep. The magma was contaminated with continental crust material. Geochemistry of the rock shows that iron, aluminium, titanium, potassium, rubidium and strontium are enriched, but sodium, magnesium and nickel are impoverished.

Alkaline volcanic rocks from north west Taiwan are found at the Shihmen Reservoir, Chiaopanshan, Taoyuan and Fuxing. The rocks are picrite, alkaline basalt and trachyandesite. The commons minerals are albite, olivine, clinopyroxene and oxides of iron and titanium. The elements enriched are sodium and titanium, and magnesium and calcium are reduced. The rock dates from the Miocene. The magma was formed under tension conditions on the continental margin from deep down in the mantle.

Volcanoes on the Coastal Range and Green Island erupted tholeiite andesite, and volcanic explosive fragments. The volcanoes erupted from the Pliocene to Pleistocene period. It is part of the Luzon Volcanic Arc. Magma was formed from subducting oceanic crust under compression about 25 km deep. The andesite rock contains some visible crystals of pyroxene or amphibole. The geochemistry of the rock shows it is enriched in potassium, strontium and rubidium and light rare earth elements. Chromium and nickel are depleted. The Chimei Volcanic Complex, near the Hsiukuluanchi River, has an age from 9 to 22.2 Ma. It is associated with copper porphyry mineralisation. It covers an area of 22 km^{2}.

Pleistocene basalt and tholeiite is found in the Penghu Islands. The lava erupted from fissures in a flood. The rock is enriched in titanium and poor in aluminium, rubidium and strontium. The alkaline basalt contains olivine and analcite. The tholeiite contains plagioclase and pyroxene. The magma originated in the upper mantle under tension conditions on the continental margin.

== Structures ==
- Hengchun Valley syncline under the Hengchun Valley
- Hengchun Fault on east side of Hengchun Valley. It extends along the Pintung Valley as the Chaochow fault and Laonungchi fault.
- Kenting Park anticline is overturned and folds Miocene rocks of the Changlo Formation, Lushan Formation to the north. Loshui Formation is on the sides of the anticline.

== Tectonics ==
The Philippine Sea Plate is converging with the continent at 7 cm per year in the west north west direction. It has compressed Cenozoic sediments by around 200 km in the last 4 Ma. The piled up sediment is rising into mountains at the rate of 5 mm per year. Accretion of the material is caused by convergence and subduction of the Luzon arc and the Eurasian Plate.

The major seismic faults in Taiwan correspond to the various suture zones between the various terranes. As a result, Taiwan has numerous mud volcanoes and hot springs. The suture zones involve arc to continent collision, making thrust melts and young mountain ranges. The mountain belt was formed roughly 6.5 Ma through oblique movement of the continental plate (Eurasian Plate) and the plate containing the volcanic arc (Luzon arc). The oblique movement allows for differing velocities of the subducting plate and deforms the crust at varying rates. Faults are produced through the release of tectonic stress by fracturing. Faults could form through compressional or tensional stresses. In the case of Tawian, faults are produced through compressional stresses and have brought about several major quakes throughout the history of the island, including the 1951 East Rift Valley earthquakes on the East Rift Valley (花東縱谷) and 1964 Baihe earthquake on the Chukou Fault. The 1946 Hsinhua earthquake ruptured the Hsinhua fault (新化斷層). The most lethal was 1935 Hsinchu-Taichung earthquake shifting on a fault at Emei Township, Hsinchu County. The second deadliest was a 7.3 quake that ruptured the Chelongpu Fault (車籠埔斷層) on 21 September 1999, known as the "921 earthquake". On 4 March 2010 at about 01:20 UTC, a magnitude 6.4 earthquake hit southern Taiwan. The seismic hazard map for Taiwan by the USGS shows 9/10 of the island as the highest rating (most hazardous).

== Offshore ==
The offshore features include the Kaoping Slope extending off the southwest coast of Taiwan into the South China Sea. This is emerging from the sea over time to extend the island.

The Hengchun Ridge extends south from the Hengchun Peninsula, and is the submarine part of the Central Range. The Southern Longitudinal Trough is the southern underwater extension of the Longitudinal Valley. The Huatang Ridge extends south off the coast from Taitung City. The Taitung Trough lies to the east behind the Luzon Arc. The Luzon Arc comes to the surface on the islands of Lüdao and Lanyu. A submarine canyon, the Taitung Canyon, cuts through the arc between the two islands linking the Taitung Trough to the Huatung Basin. The canyon cuts across the Huatung Basin bending to the north and reaching the Ryukyu Trench. A 5.5 magnitude earthquake struck at 08:00 GMT on 20 March 2011, near the canyon breaking segments C and D of the East Asia Crossing undersea cable. The Huatung Basin lies east of Taiwan south of the city of Hualien. It extends west till the Gagua Ridge about 110 km offshore.

The Taiwan Banks are a shallow part of the main continental shelf off mainland China lying to the south and south west of Penghu Islands. The Taixinan Basin (台西南盆地) is located between Taiwan Banks and the Central Mountains.

The Okinawa Trough, the back-arc basin behind the Ryukyu Islands, shows up on the coastline as a bay between Dome Point north to Sanshokiaku (easternmost point of Taiwan) (24.6° to 25°N).

== Geophysics ==
Taiwan has a very strong, positive Bouguer gravity anomaly in the Coastal Range, at over +4 × 10^{−4} m/s^{2}. A local low below -2 × 10^{−4} m/s^{2} is on the western side centered near Zhoulan. The gravity low is due to a mass deficit in the Taiwan Strait which is a flexural basin.

Positive magnetic variations are found in narrow strips, west-southwest oriented of the west coast, and east-northeast off the northern coast, and south-north offshore from the Coastal Range heading south. These are of the order of 200 nT.

The Crustal thickness is around 30 km, with over 2 km of thickening under the Central Range, and thinning off the east coast. Taiwan is on the edge of the continental shelf, so the thickness of the crust is constant through the Taiwan Strait to the mainland.

Heat flow is greatest to west of the Longitudinal Valley at rates exceeding 240 mWm^{−2}.

== Hydrology ==
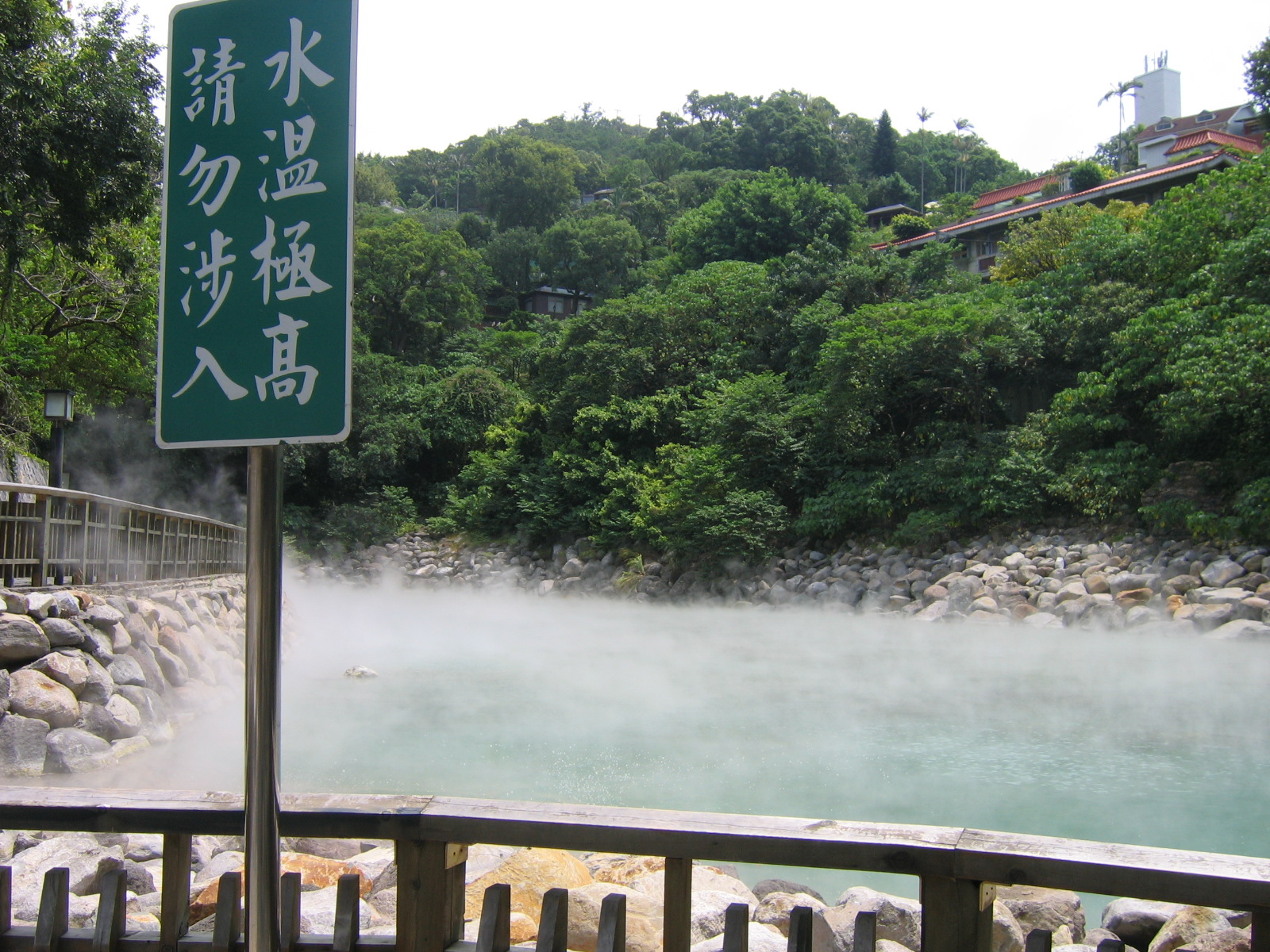
Beitou hot spring valley

Many of the rocks in Taiwan have low pore space and have little ground water.

There are several hot springs in Taiwan, with most around the northern volcanic region. The Chingshui geothermal region is named after the Cingshuei River 13 km south west of Yilan.

Rivers in Taiwan transport a large amount of sediment to the sea. The south end of the Longitudinal Valley (Huadong Valley) discharges the Peinan River with 88,000,000 tons of sediment per year. East-flowing rivers move 17, 15 31 and 22 megatons per year of sediment. The Cho Shiu shifts 54 MT per year. Rivers running south from the Central Range move over 100 MT of sediment per year.

== Study ==
=== Mapping ===
The first geological map of Taiwan was made in 1898 by Y. Ishii titled A Map of Geology and Mineral Resources of the Island of Taiwan. It was at a scale of 1:800,000 and showed six items in its legend. Japan needed oil and coal for the war against Russia in 1904, so study began on the coal fields in the north part of Taiwan, more detailed maps were made, and the next one was published in 1911 by Y. Deguchi and G. Hosoya at a scale of 1:300,000. A third map was produced in 1926 titled: Geological Map of Taiwan showing Mineral Distribution by Y. Ichikawa and H. Takahashi. It showed 19 rock units. A 1935 coloured map by Y. Ichikawa had a scale of 1:500,000. In 1953 the Geological Survey of Taiwan (台灣地質調查所) published a map compiled by L.S. Chang at a 1:300,000 scale. A 1974 map had two scales 1:250,000 and 1:500,000. A second edition was printed in 1986 along with notes.
