= Ilocos-Central Luzon Basin =

Ilocos-Central Luzon Basin is a sedimentary basin and stratigraphic formation in the Ilocos Region and Central Luzon Region, Philippines. It is one of the 16 major sedimentary basins in the country and stretches from the vicinity of the Manila metropolitan area in the south to Ilocos Norte in the north.

The basin is filled with sedimentary rocks that range in age from Late Oligocene to Pliocene. These rocks were deposited in a variety of environments, including deep marine, shallow marine, and non-marine settings. The basin is also home to a number of hydrocarbon reservoirs, which are currently being explored for oil and gas potential.

== Stratigraphic groupings ==
=== Ilocos ===
- Suyo Schist - greenschist, serpentinite, chert
- Ilocos Peridotite - serpentinized peridotite
- Bangui Formation - sandstone, conglomerate, mudstone; includes olistostrome
- Magabobbo Limestone - micritic limestone, calcarenites, minor argillites
- Bojeador Formation - conglomerate, graywacke, shale, limestone and associated volcanic flows and pyroclastics
- Pasaleng Quartz Diorite
- Dagot Limestone - reefal limestone, calcarenites, biosparites, minor calcareous volcanic conglomerate, particularly at the base and middle section
- Batac Formation - thinly bedded sandstone and shale; conglomerate
- Pasuquin Limestone - limestone with minor calcareous conglomerate, calcirudite, calcarenite
- Uplifted Coral Reefs

=== Luzon Central Valley ===
==== West side ====
- Aksitero Formation - Lower Bigbiga Limestone – micritic limestone with tuffaceous turbidites and minor chert; Upper Burgos Member – Limestone, tuffaceous sandstone, siltstone and mudstone. This is coequival with Bigbiga Limestone.
- Moriones Formation - interbedded sandstone, shale, conglomerate with minor limestone; identified members are Sansotero Limestone and Malo Pungatan Limestone
- Malinta Formation - Lower Pau Sandstone – sandstones with minor tuffaceous shale, conglomerates and lapilli tuff; Upper Aparri Gorge Sandstone – sandstones with shale stringers and conglomerate lenses
- Tarlac Formation - interbedded sandstone, shale, conglomerate
- Amlang Formation - turbiditic sandstones and shale with minor conglomerates
- Cataguintingan Formation - mainly tuffaceous sandstones, with interbeds of siltstones, shales and conglomerate and minor limestone lenses
- Bamban Formation - tuffaceous sandstone and lapilli tuff with basal conglomerate.
- Damortis Formation - sandstone, calcarenite, siltstone, limestone and marl

==== East side ====
- Barenas-Baito Formation
- Bayabas Formation
- Angat Formation
- Madlum Formation
- Makapilapil Formation
- Lambak Formation
- Tartaro Formation
- Guadalupe Formation

== See also ==
List of stratigraphic formations in the Philippines
