= Chilung Volcanic Group =

Group of extinct volcanoes in Taiwan

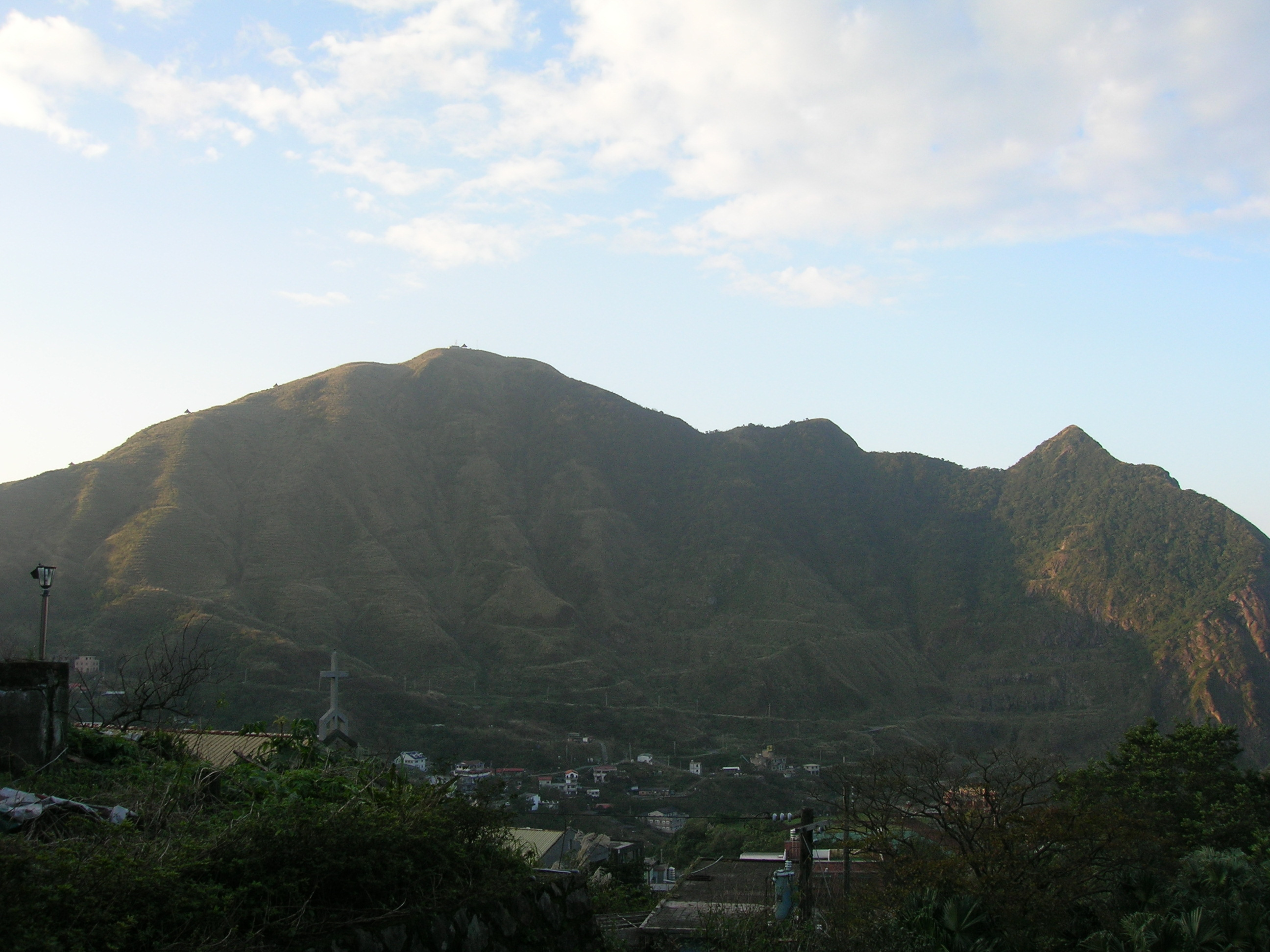
- Chilungshan (基隆山), one of the volcanoes, has a height of 588 m.

Highest point
- Coordinates: 25°07′18″N 121°50′54″E

Geography
- Location within Taiwan
- Location: Ruifang District, New Taipei City, Taiwan

Geology
- Volcanic arc: Ryukyu arc

The Chilung Volcanic Group or Keelung Volcanic Group (Chinese: 基隆火山群; pinyin: Jīlóng Huǒshān Qún) is a group of extinct volcanoes located in northern Taiwan, lying to the east of Taipei and Keelung (Chilung), and adjoining the northern coast of the island of Taiwan. Together with Mount Guanyin and the Tatun Volcanic Group, it belongs to the northern Taiwan volcanic province, constituting the western end of the island chains of the Ryukyu arc. Five separate bodies can be distinguished: Chilungshan (Mount Keelung), Penshan, Wutanshan, Tsaoshan and Chimuling.

The group is mainly composed of andesite, although there is some heterogeneity caused by the mixing between mantle-derived and continental material. Aging of andesite, biotite, and zircon samples have yielded age estimates between 0.8 and 1.7 Ma. It comprises the largest gold-copper deposits of Taiwan.

== See also ==
- Ruifang, Taipei
- Jiufen
