= Tectonics of the South China Sea =

The South China Sea Basin is one of the largest marginal basins in Asia. The South China Sea is located to the east of Vietnam, west of Philippines and the Luzon Strait, and north of Borneo. Tectonically, it is surrounded by the Indochina Block on the west, Philippine Sea Plate on the east, Yangtze Block to the north. A subduction boundary exists between the Philippine Sea Plate and the Asian Plate. The formation of the South China Sea Basin was closely related with the collision between the Indian Plate and Eurasian Plates. The collision thickened the continental crust and changed the elevation of the topography from the Himalayan orogenic zone to the South China Sea, especially around the Tibetan Plateau. The location of the South China Sea makes it a product of several tectonic events. All the plates around the South China Sea Basin underwent clockwise rotation, subduction and experienced an extrusion process from the early Cenozoic to the Late Miocene.

The geological history can be classified into five tectonic evolutionary stages. (1) rift system development (2) sea floor spreading, (3) subsidence of the South China Sea, (4) closure of the South China Sea Basin and (5) uplift of Taiwan.

== Rift system development ==
In the initial stage of the development of South China Sea, a basin was developed by extension to form two passive margins. The consensus is that the extension propagated from the northeast to the southwest, although some experts argue that the southwest basin is in fact older. The rifting and multiple grabens initiated around 55 Ma, based on seismic profiles across the southern China Shelf. The rifting intensified around 50 Ma due to the collision of the Indian and Eurasian plates.

Different and evolving models on how the extension occurred have been proposed, by for example, Tapponnier et al. (1982), Taylor & Hayes (1983), Wang (2009), and by Cullen (2010).

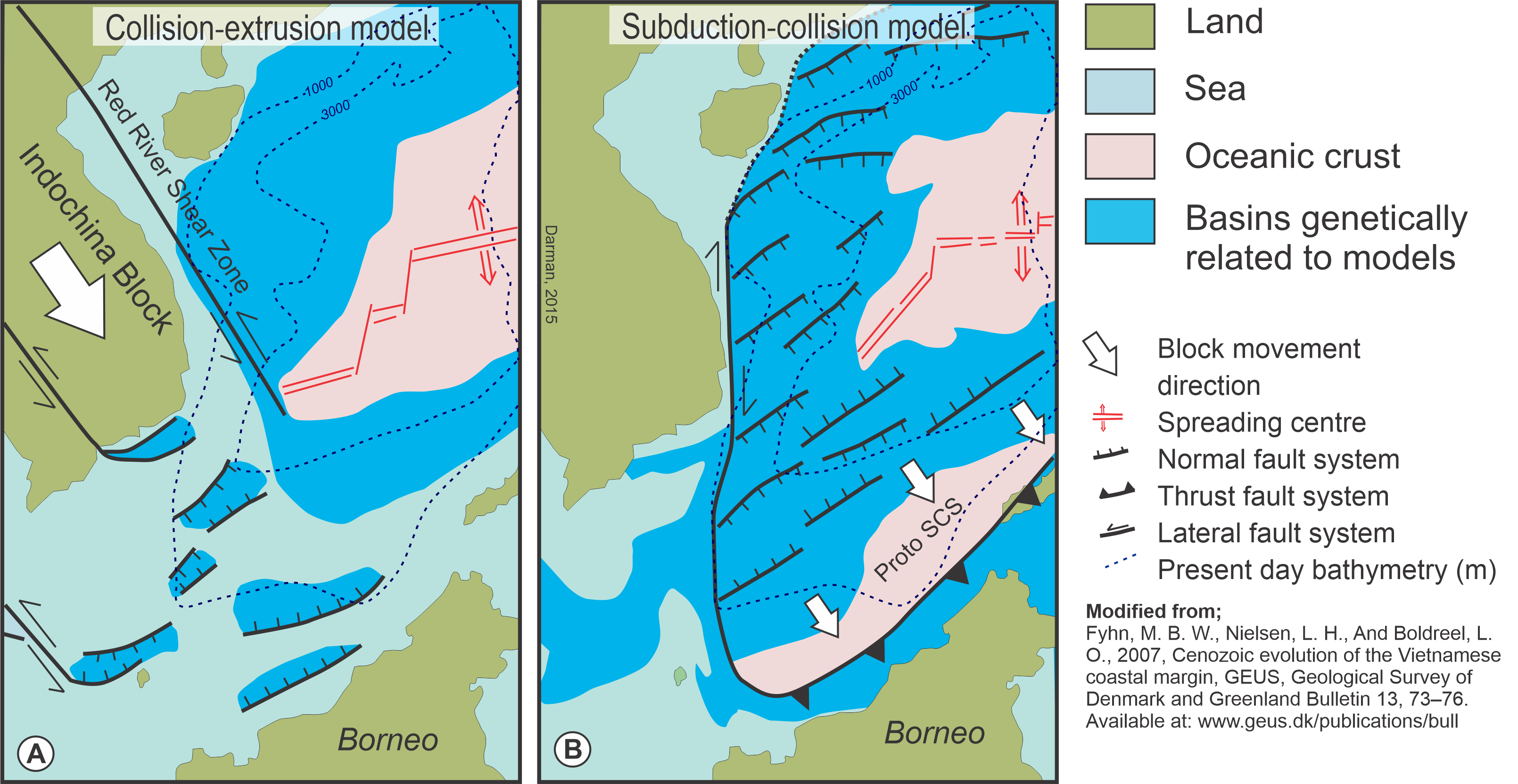
Conceptual models of two early theories proposed for the formation of the South China Sea.

Wang's model for South China Sea rifting proposes a different area of rift development. The north and northeastern parts of the South China Sea formed their rifts earlier in the Paleocene. The south and southwestern parts of the South China Sea showed a later rifting around the Eocene or later. The difference in rifting and time gap between the northeastern and southwestern regions indicate the South China Sea is not a geologically homogeneous area, and its lithosphere could be divided into two areas, southwest and northeast according to its tectonic evolution. The reasons behind these differences in its rifting stage could be various, such as impact from different plates and different distribution of plumes under the crust. The Red River Fault along the western boundary of the South China Sea was believed to influence the rifting in the south and southwestern regions. Strike-slip faults.

Cullen indicated that the South China Sea Basin's rifting could be traced back to the late Cretaceous and the extension concluded in two episodes during the Cenozoic. The first episode of extension occurred in the Early Paleocene and was widely distributed. The first rift system was located mainly in the Dangerous Ground (SE of South China Sea and in the Phu Khanh Basin, offshore central Vietnam. The slab pull between Philippines and South Asia is speculated to be the main force which drove the extension of the Dangerous Grounds and other parts of the South China Sea in that initial phase. The later episode of extension appeared from late Eocene to Early Miocene and propagated towards the southwest. During the second stage of extension the crust was thinned and finally experienced break-up.

== Sea floor spreading ==
Seafloor spreading can be discussed using the magnetic anomaly lineations and the distribution of two types of granite. Theoretically, seafloor spreading should follow the rift phase during basin opening. However, continental rifting and seafloor spreading overlap for around 5 m.y. during the Early Miocene. For example, when northeast area was in the seafloor spreading stage, rifting was ongoing in the southwestern part.

Reconstruction of the seafloor spreading following rifting comes from magnetic anomalies. There is no consensus on the precise time when the seafloor started to spread. Brais et al. (1993) proposed that the seafloor was spreading between 30 Ma and 16 Ma. However, new evidence which was found in the Luzon Strait area shows the spreading could be as old as 37 Ma. The whole process of seafloor spreading could be divided into two parts, spreading in the Northeast and spreading in the Southwest.

- During the seafloor spreading process, three episodes of spreading were classified based on the magnetic anomalies. The seafloor spreading center jumps three times, at 25.5 Ma, at 24.7 Ma and at 20.5 Ma. These jumps are regarded as the boundaries of the three sea floor spreading episodes that moved the extension to the south out of its original position in the Xisha Trough. Figure 4 shows the trajectory of the seafloor spreading center.
  - 37 Ma to 25.5 Ma. Older magnetic anomalies 14-16 appeared in the northeast of the South China Sea, in the Luzon Strait, while younger ones (anomalies 11–7) are located in the central and western part of the basin. This distribution indicates that during the first episode of seafloor spreading, the ridge migrated from east to west. At the end of the first stage, the ridge jumped 50 km from north to south, and a new center formed parallel to the old ridge (Fig. 4).
  - 25.5 Ma to 24.7. The second, bigger jump occurred at the end of this episode. The magnetic anomaly lineations range from 7 to 6B during this episode.
  - 24.7 Ma to 20.5 Ma. The third ridge jump moved further in the southwest direction. The geometry of the South China Sea Basin after 20.5 Ma is similar to the current shape. The ridge stopped jumping after this stage. After 20.5 Ma, the seafloor spreading moved into the southwestern area of the South China Sea where it finished around 16 to 17 Ma.
- In addition to the magnetic anomalies, the distribution of igneous rocks could also be potential evidence to determine the time of seafloor spreading.

Analysis of the petrology of several microblocks in the South China Sea were done by Yan. Two types of granites were classified. They are tonalitic granite and monzogranite. Tonalitic granite contains higher content of Ti, Al, Fe, Mg, Ca, Na and P, less Si and K, and could be derived from melting of the mantle and lower Precambrian crust. Monzogranite, however, was found to be derived by crustal melting. Therefore, the presence of monzogranite indicates an extension of South China Sea lithosphere. Changing ratios of these two categories of granites, together with their trace and major element compositions, as well as petrology also shows the changing character of seafloor spreading history in Cenozoic.

== Tectonic models of sea floor spreading ==
There are three main models that try to interpret how the opening and formation of the South China Sea happened over long periods of geological time. They are the collision-extrusion model, the subduction-collision model, and the hybrid model. These models were illustrated by Fyhn et al, 2009.

=== Collision-extrusion model ===
The collision-extrusion model argues that the opening of the South China Sea Basin is related to the collision of the Indian Plate and the Eurasian Plate. The Borneo and Indochina plate are still considered as a single block and attached to each other. When India collided with Eurasia, part of the continent was pushed towards the southeast. This is also called "continental escape" by some papers. This model argues that seafloor spreading was triggered by the push from the collision in the west. A strike-slip fault was formed as a result. A spreading ridge was initiated in the left lateral part of this strike-slip fault. The seafloor spreading ceased with the extrusion stopped. Because of the sea floor spreading, the Borneo block underwent rotation. Although this model explains the geometrical change of the South China Sea Basin during its tectonic evolution, it is still vague on some parts especially in relation to the rotation of Borneo. This model also proposes that no subduction occurred along the north side of Borneo, which is hard to explain given the existence of thrust faults in the SE South China Sea Basin.

=== Subduction–collision model ===
The subduction model indicates that the opening of the South China Sea was caused by the slab pull from the subduction of a proto-South China Sea oceanic plate south under Borneo. The existence of the Sabah orogeny supports this subduction. The subduction starts in the Paleocene and ended in the Early Miocene. The disadvantage of this model is that it could not explain changes in the seafloor spreading axes during the spreading of the South China Sea Basin or the rotation of Borneo.

=== Hybrid model ===
The hybrid model can be regarded as a mix of the collision-extrusion model and the subduction-collision model. Some of the elements are kept from the collision-extrusion model, such as the rotation of Borneo, however, subduction was also thought to accompany the extrusion. The subduction zone migrated towards the southeast of the South China Sea, which matches with the former convergent boundary along the northern edge of the Borneo Block. This model is used more widely than the other two.

== Start of closure of South China Seas ==
- The collision between the Australia and Asian plates caused the rotation of Borneo and the closure at the south boundary of the South China Sea.
- Five smaller collisions with crustal thickening occurred and played a significant role in blocking the sea way between Indonesia and the Pacific.
- The collision between the Luzon Arc and mainland Asia lead to the uplift of Taiwan. This collision has been migrating west since the Miocene. With the collision between plates, volcanoes became active. Wang et al. (2000) reported three volcanic ash layers concentrated around 10 Ma, 6 Ma and 2 Ma in the South China Sea, associated with collision and subduction events to the east that occurred after seafloor spreading.
- Luzon Strait opened with the uplift of Taiwan. The change of seawater depth in Luzon Strait caused more erosive and cold bottom currents from the western Pacific to dissolve the carbonate below Luzon Strait. The opening of Luzon Strait marked the start of South China Sea Basin as a semi-closed basin.

== Subsidence of the South China Sea ==
As rifting, seafloor-spreading and collision processed, subsidence also occurred in the South China Sea. Due to the unique location of the South China Sea during the Cenozoic, with a subduction zone on east side, the Red River shear zone on the west, and the jumping of the spreading ridge to the south, different but mostly extensional faults developed and caused subsidence forming a basin. Both rift-related subsidence and post-rift thermal subsidence are found in the South China Sea.

- In the eastern area, a fore-arc basin was formed with the subduction of the South China Sea under the Philippine Sea plate. Palawan and Taixinan Basins are typical examples of this type of subsidence.
- In the western area, several strike-slip faults and normal faults caused the subsidence caused by the Red River shear zone. Yinggehai basin which has the thickest sediment fill (14 km) developed in this area.
- In the southern area, normal faults formed due to the rifting. However, some basins in this area have two parts in their subsidence history, such as the Malay Basin and Penyu Basin. The stages are divided by regional inversion in the Miocene ~16 Ma. This inversion separated subsidence into syn-rift and post-rift stages instead of a continuous subsidence process.

There was also a subsidence rate change in the South China Sea at 25 Ma and 5 Ma. At 25 Ma, the spreading ridge jumped from the southwest and triggered thermal subsidence and marine transgression in the north South China Sea as thermal subsidence began. Change of rate at 5 Ma occurred with the subsidence in the eastern zone and the rate increased due to the collision of the Luzon Arc in the region of modern Taiwan. There is also renewed subsidence in the NW of the basin, in the Yinggehai Basin after 5 Ma caused by reversal of motion on the Red River Fault.

== Impacts of tectonic movements on petroleum resources ==
The north and northwest parts of the South China Sea are surrounded with rift basins on the passive continental margins. They are the Pearl River Mouth Basin, the Qiongdongnan Basin, the Yinggehai Basin and the Phu Khanh Basin. The development of these basins is closely related to the tectonic history of the South China Sea. Gong et al. (2011), based on extensive drilling results and multichannel seismic data, documented the impacts of these tectonic activities on the deposition of source, reservoir and seal rocks and on the formation of various types of trapping mechanism.

These basins show typical McKenzie-type (1978) two-stage extension, characterized by a differential subsidence stage (rifting) and followed by thermal regional subsidence stage (post-rifting). Each stage is capable to generate a separate petroleum system. The Pearl River Mouth Basin, for example, developed four rift basins in the Tertiary.

The Qiongdongnan Basin lies to the west of Pearl River Mouth Basin, both of which share a similar tectonic tectonostratigraphy. The former's subsidence history however has been influenced by an additional tectonic element, the wrenching movements along the Red River Fault System. The basin's post-rift sequence is separated by an early Miocene unconformity from the syn-rift sequence, from which gas has been produced exclusively.

Rift structure in the Yinggehai Basin, due to its thick Neogene overburden, has not yet been identified but is expected as the basin is surrounded by rift basins of similar ages. Clockwise rotation of the Indochina block along the Red River Fault System has been attributed to the transtensional stresses in the basin. Subsidence of the basin, however, predates the initial movements along the Red River Fault System. This suggests that the earlier extension in the Yinggehai Basin may have responded to the same tectonic regime as that experienced by the surrounding basins. Similar to the nearby Qiongdongnan basin, a basal Miocene unconformity separating the post-rift from the syn-rift sequences in this basin. This unconformity is, however, regionally diachronous, due to wrench movements. Natural gas has been found in the basin's post-rift sequence, but the hydrocarbon potential of the syn-rift sequence has yet to be proven.
