= Ryukyu Arc =

Island arc between Kyushu and Taiwan

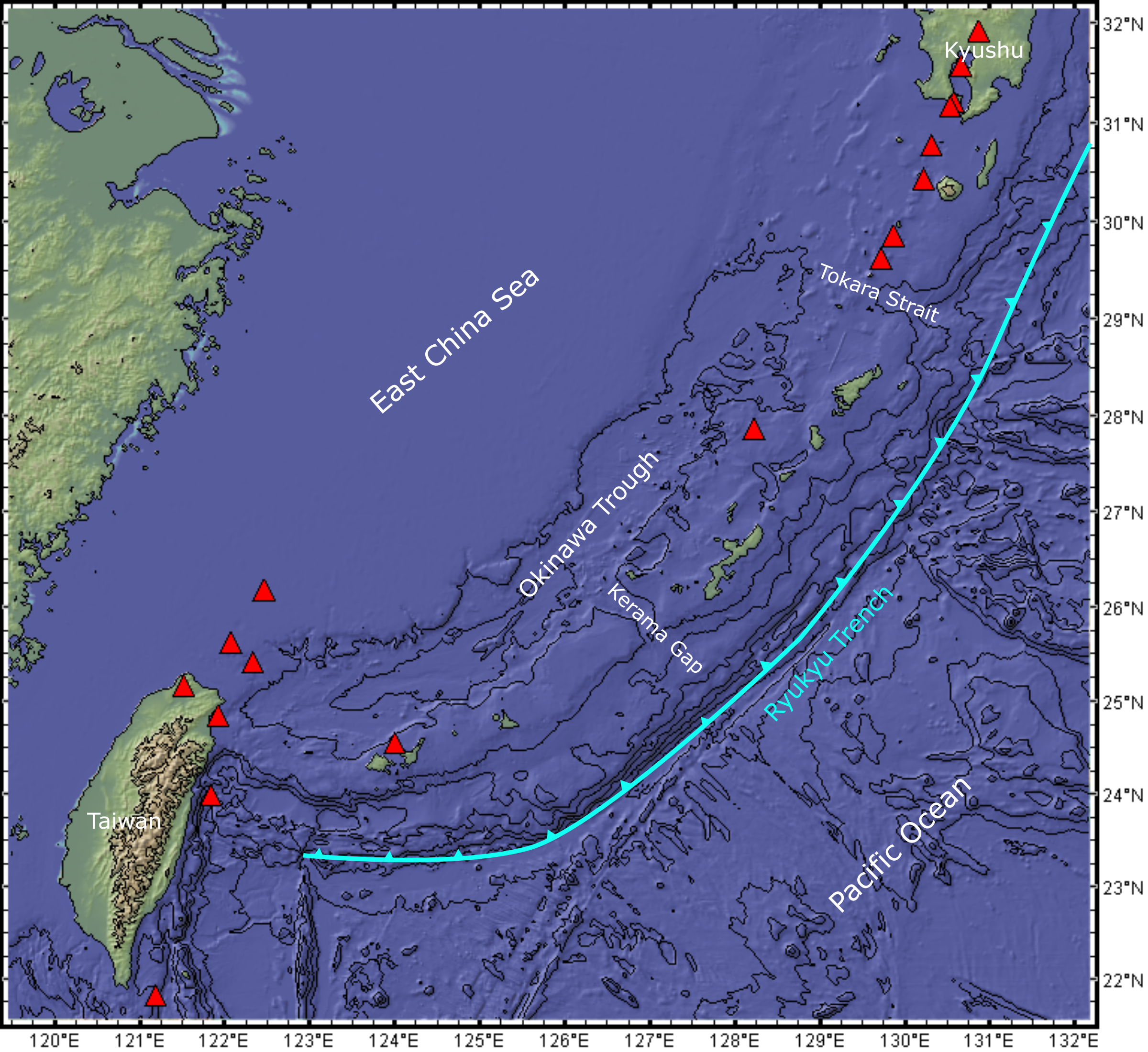
Map of the Ryukyu Arc. Red triangles represent volcanoes based on Aster Volcano Archive (NASA-METI) data. Contours in 1 km intervals. Figure made with GeoMapApp (www.geomapapp.org) / CC BY / CC BY (Ryan et al., 2009).

The Ryukyu Arc is an island arc which extends from the south of Kyushu along the Ryukyu Islands to the northeast of Taiwan, spanning about 1,200 kilometres (750 mi). It is located along a section of the convergent plate boundary where the Philippine Sea Plate is subducting northwestward beneath the Eurasian Plate along the Ryukyu Trench. The arc has an overall northeast to southwest trend and is located northwest of the Pacific Ocean and southeast of the East China Sea. It runs parallel to the Okinawa Trough, an active volcanic arc, and the Ryukyu Trench. The Ryukyu Arc, based on its geomorphology, can be segmented from north to south into Northern Ryukyu, Central Ryukyu, and Southern Ryukyu; the Tokara Strait separates Northern Ryukyu and Central Ryukyu at about 130˚E while the Kerama Gap separates Central Ryukyu and Southern Ryukyu at about 127 ˚E. The geological units of the arc include igneous, sedimentary, and metamorphic rocks, ranging from the Paleozoic to Cenozoic in age.

== Geological setting ==
A number of studies defined the extent of the Ryukyu Arc geographically and morphologically into three parts: Northern Ryukyu, which includes the Ōsumi Islands; Central Ryukyu, which includes Amami Islands and Okinawa Islands; Southern Ryukyu, which includes Miyako Islands and Yaeyama Islands. The northernmost and southernmost parts of the Ryukyu Arc terminate in Kyushu and Taiwan, respectively.

The geological and structural features of Southern Ryukyu are quite different from those of Northern and Central Ryukyu; Southern Ryukyu, and Northern and Central Ryukyu may have developed in disparate geological settings before the middle Miocene. Accretionary complexes in Northern and Central Ryukyu are considered as the extension of the Outer Zone of Southwest Japan, whereas metamorphic rocks in Southern Ryukyu are associated with the Inner Zone of Southwest Japan. The arc might be united into the present configuration in the Pliocene-Pleistocene due to different rates of southeastward migration as tectonics proceeded.

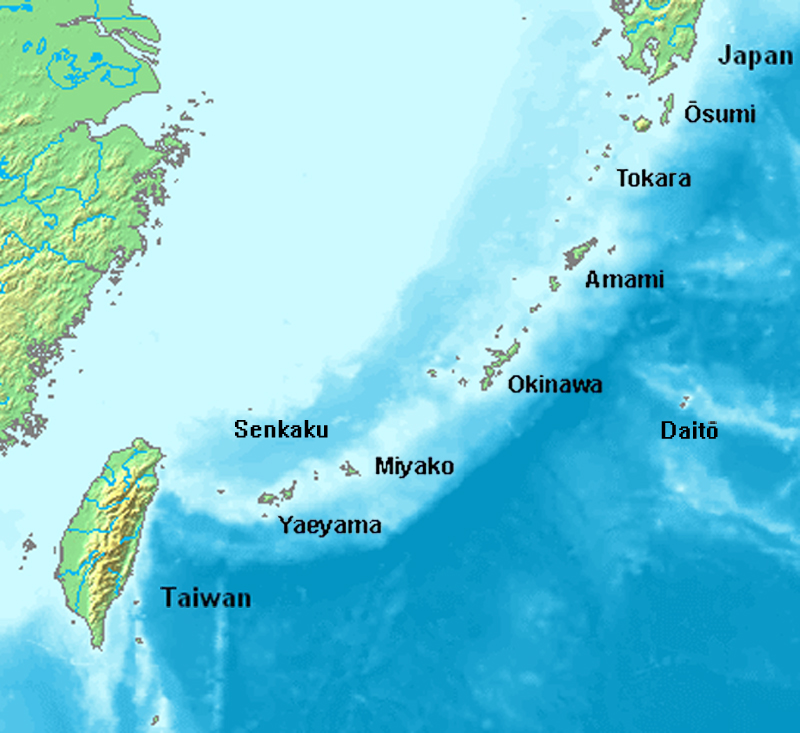
Location of the Ryukyu Islands

Geomorphological Division
Arc Segment	Geographical Location
Northern Ryukyu	Osumi Islands
Tokara Strait
Central Ryukyu	Amami Islands, Okinawa Islands
Kerama Gap
Southern Ryukyu	Miyako Island, Yaeyama Islands

=== Okinawa Trough ===
The Okinawa Trough is the back-arc basin of the Ryukyu Arc, and has been formed by lithospheric extension of the continental Eurasian Plate. Extensional grabens, about 10 km wide and about 50–100 km long, with en echelon alignment can be found in the middle to southern parts of Okinawa Trough. Of the whole Okinawa Trough, the southern part is the most evolved and active, in that, its maximum depth, which is greater than other parts, is about 2200 m. The Okinawa Trough accommodates terrigenous sediments from the continental shelf of Asia and the Ryukyu Arc at a high rate.

Schematic of island arc system.

=== Seismicity ===
The Ryukyu Arc is a site of active seismicity characterised by shallow earthquakes, given the ongoing convergence between the Philippine Sea Plate and Eurasian Plate. Seismic data of earthquakes have been used to detect seismic structures below the Ryukyu Arc. Low seismic velocity zones, which are possibly associated with the upwelling of magma, have been discovered beneath active volcanoes and the Okinawa Trough.

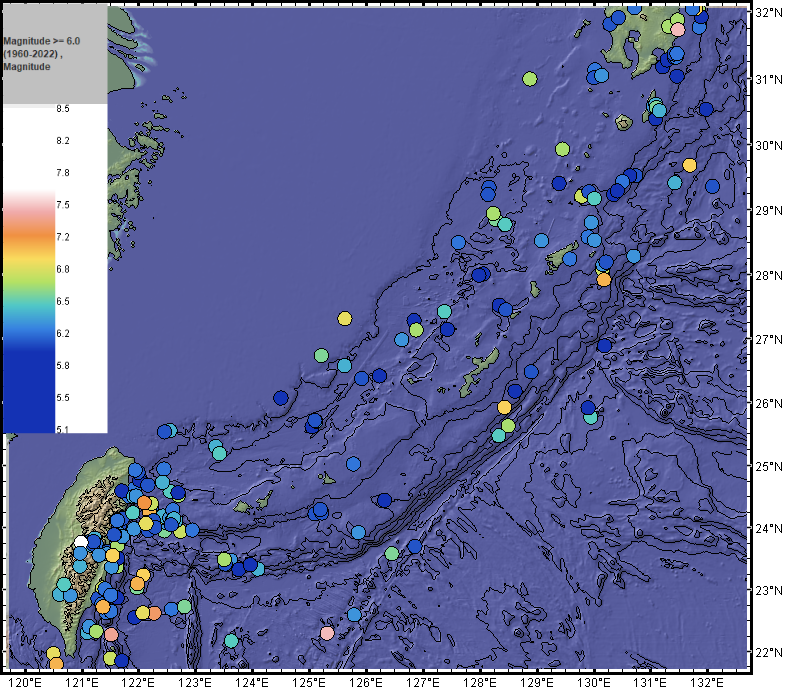
M≥6.0 (1960–2022) Earthquakes in the Ryukyu Arc. Earthquake data from USGS-ANSS Catalog. Contours in 1 km interval. Figure made with GeoMapApp (www.geomapapp.org) / CC BY / CC BY (Ryan et al., 2009).

=== Volcanoes ===
An active volcanic front lies 100 km above the Wadati-Benioff zone (a planar zone of seismicity at the interface between the subducting and overriding plates) in Northern Ryukyu and gradually fades off in Central and Southern Ryukyu.

== Geological units ==
Major, but not all, geological units of the Ryukyu Arc are herein summarised.

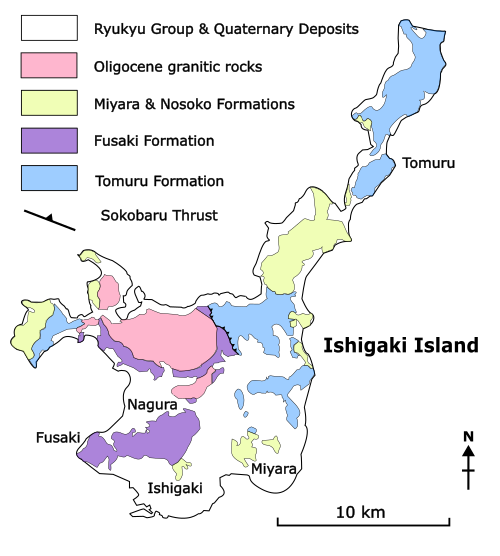
Simplified Geological Map of Ishigaki Island, after Nakae (2013) and Nishimura (1998)

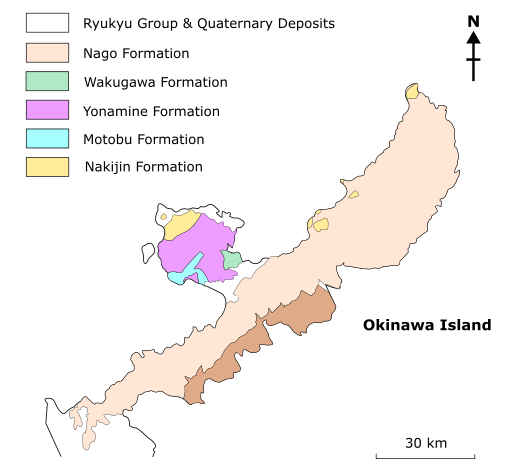
Simplified Geological Map of northern Okinawa Island, after Miyagi et al., (2013).

=== Motobu and Yonamine Formations ===
The Motobu and Yonamine Formations are Permian rocks that constitute the basement of the Motobu peninsula of Okinawa Island, Central Ryukyu. The Motobu Formation consists mainly of limestone interbedded with chert and phyllite. The limestone contains foraminifera fossils of Permian age. The Yonamine Formation, with strata of interbedded phyllite, slate, sandstone, limestone, greenstone, and chert, underlies the Motobu Formation and contains Permian corals.

=== Tomuru Formation ===
The Tomuru Formation is distributed in the Iriomote and Ishigaki Islands of the Yaeyama Islands, Southern Ryukyu. The formation has an age of 220–190 Ma (million years ago) (Late Triassic-Early Jurassic) and comprises ultramafic rocks and high pressure/temperature (P/T) metamorphic rocks, i.e., metagabbro and mafic, siliceous, and pelitic schists.

=== Fusaki Formation ===
The Fusaki Formation, located at the Ishigaki Island and Taketomi Island of the Yaeyama Islands in Southern Ryukyu, comprises weakly metamorphosed olistromal rocks: allochthonous blocks of chert, mudstone, sandstone, and limestone are embedded in a muddy matrix. The metamorphic age of this formation ranges from 145 to 130 Ma (Early Cretaceous) and was determined by K-Ar phengitic micas dating. Radiolaria data show that the formation accreted in the Toarcian in the Early Jurassic. This formation is part of an accretionary complex of a Middle Jurassic subduction zone. On Ishigaki Island, this formation is thrusted beneath the Tomuru Formation along the Sokobaru thrust and is intruded by Oligocene granitic rocks, named the Omoto Pluton.

=== Nakijin Formation ===
The Nakijin Formation is a 450–500m thick deposit of limestone, basalt, and a minor amount of calcareous siltstone, tuffaceous and calcareous mudstone. Fossil records of ammonites and halobiids in this formation suggest a Late Triassic age. The Nakijin Formation can be found in Central Ryukyu, i.e., Sesoko Island and the northwestern part of the Motobu peninsula of Okinawa Island. This formation overlies the Yonamine Formation along a reverse fault.

=== Shimanto Group ===
The Shimanto Group is a set of metamorphic rocks dated from Early Cretaceous to earliest Miocene which are associated with the Shimanto belt. The Shimanto belt is an accretionary complex in the Outer Zone of Southwest Japan which extends from Honshu, Shikoku, and Kyushu to Northern and Central Ryukyu. The group comprises sedimentary and metasedimentary rocks metamorphosed up to greenschist facies, including flysch-type sandstone and slate with mafic greenstones. Deformations such as northwest-dipping, isoclinal, overturned folds and SE-verging thrust faults can be found in the Shimanto Group of Central and Northern Ryukyu.

In Okinawa Island, Central Ryukyu, the Shimanto Group is separated into the Nago Formation and the Kayo Formation. The Nago Formation comprises pelitic and mafic schist, phyllite, and slate, with minor chert and limestone, and crops out most of northern Okinawa Island. Though only trace fossils have been found in the formation, it is thought to be Cretaceous to early Eocene in age by correlations with other formations in the island. The Kayo Formation features beds of turbidite containing mudstone, sandstone, and nummulite fossils that indicate middle Eocene age. ] It underlies the Nago Formation along a northwest-dipping thrust fault. Thrust-folding and metamorphism of the formation suggest a trench origin.

=== Miyara and Nosoko Formations ===
The Eocene Miyara and Nosoko Formations crop out the Yaeyama Islands, Southern Ryukyu. The Miyara Formation is a south-southwest-dipping succession of conglomerate, sandstone, shale, and limestone deposited along the coast of Ishigaki Island. A large variety of marine fossils—e.g., calcareous algae, foraminifera, corals, echinoderms, bryozoans, and gastropods— have been preserved in the limestones, and molluscs were also found in the conglomerate. Foraminifera and calcareous algae in the limestones suggest a late Eocene age.

The Nosoko Formation is a 300m thick sequence of tuff, volcanic sandstone and breccia, and lavas with dykes, sills, and other small intrusions. This formation is widely exposed at the Nosoko peninsula in northern Ishigaki Island. It also lies conformably above the Miyara Formation. Paleomagnetic data of the Nosoko Formation indicate a mean deflection of the magnetic direction at about 30˚ clockwise away from the expected pole. This data, coupled with radiometric ages, suggest that Southern Ryukyu might have rotated about 25˚ with respect to the Asian continent in the Miocene at 6–10 Ma.

=== Yaeyama Group ===
The Yaeyama Group is a set of sedimentary rocks comprising primarily sandstone with interbeds of conglomerate, limestone, mudstone, and coal seams, and cropping out the Yaeyama Islands, Southern Ryukyu. The age of the group is early Miocene, as suggested by paleontological data. Coal seams, cross laminae, and trace fossils reveal that the group is possibly derived from sediments in a continental shelf. The group shows less deformation such as tilting and folding than the Eocene formations of Southern Ryukyu, suggesting that Southern Ryukyu has been stable since the early Miocene.

=== Shimajiri Group ===
The Shimajiri Group consists of an upper and a lower member. The upper member (Shinzato) of late Miocene or Pliocene age consists of tuff and shale; the lower member (Yonabaru) of Miocene age contains shale interbedded with siltstone and sandstone. The Shimajiri Group is the first geological unit to be found across Northern, Central, and Southern Ryukyu. Northern, Central Ryukyu, and Southern Ryukyu may have had different basins and tectonic settings prior to the Late Miocene (the age of deposition of the group). Despite being widely distributed across the East China Sea, the Ryukyu Arc and its forearc, the group does not occur in the southern Okinawa Trough. Rifting of the southern Okinawa Trough preceded the deposition of the group.

=== Ryukyu Group ===
The Ryukyu Group is Pleistocene deposits formed after the development of the Shimajiri Group but before Holocene sediments had been deposited. It is distributed in Central and Southern Ryukyu and is marked by a distinct unconformity above the Shimajiri Group. The group comprises predominantly the Ryukyu Limestone and Terrace Deposits of sand and gravel. The Ryukyu Limestone is generally 40–60m thick and is characterised by post-depositional faulting, which resulted in the formation of terraces and the associated sediments (Terrace Deposits). Following the deposition of the Ryukyu Limestone, prevalent northwest–southeast faulting across the Ryukyu Arc resulted in an episode of dome-like uplifting of basement rocks in the Ryukyu Islands, named the 'Uruma Movement'.

== Tectonics ==
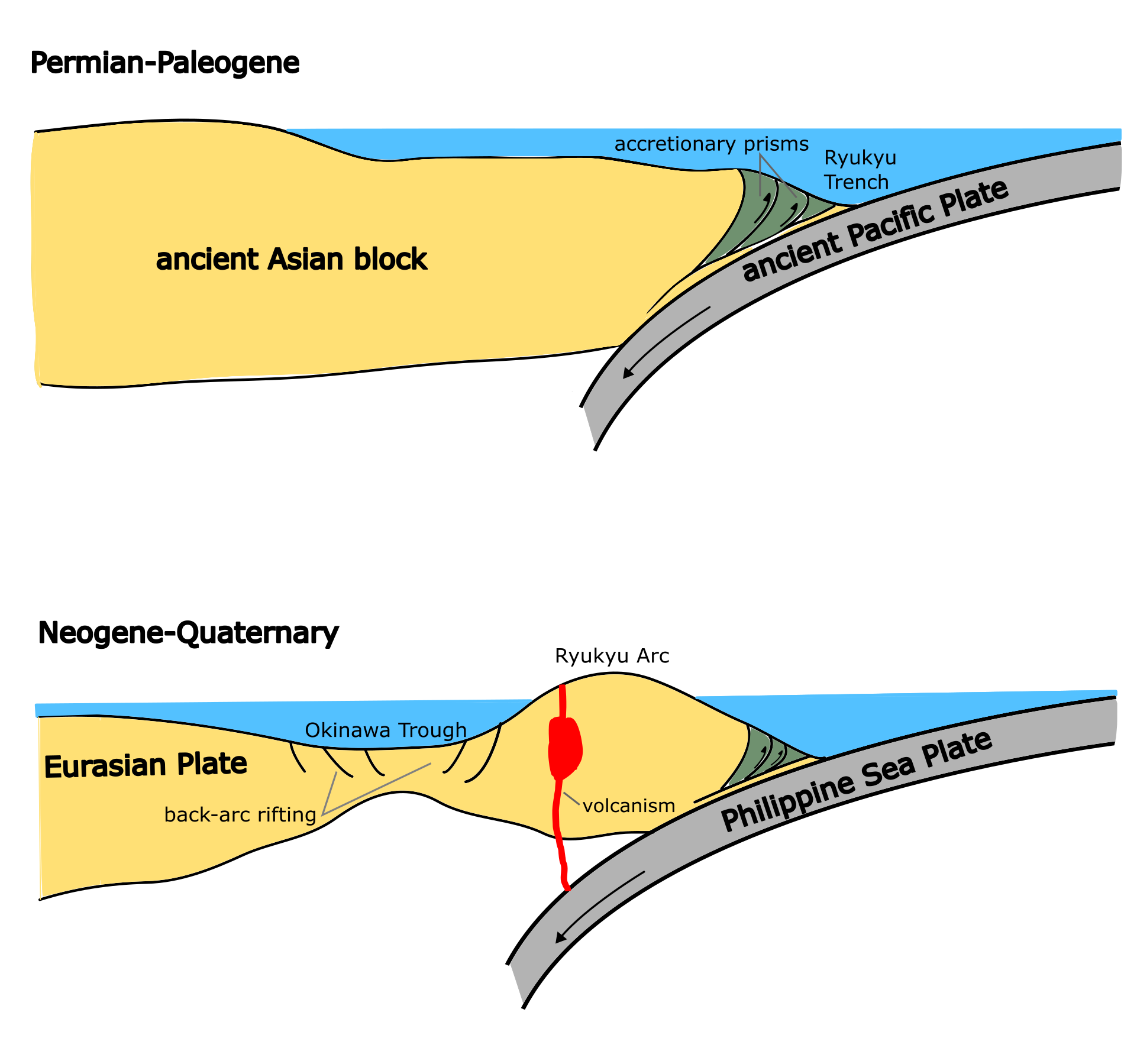
Evolution of the Ryukyu Arc. Modified from Ujiie (1994).

Along the Ryukyu Trench, the Philippine Sea Plate is subducting northwestward under the Eurasian Plate at an estimated velocity of 5–7 cm/year. The subduction angles become increasingly oblique to the arc toward south. Global Positioning System data show that southern Kyushu and the Ryukyu Arc migrate southeastward (toward the Ryukyu Trench) relative to Eurasia, as compared to the westward-northwestward migration of other arcs of Japan.

=== Permian-Paleogene ===
Permian-Jurassic accretionary prisms accumulated along the eastern side of Pangea, where the ancient Pacific Plate subducted under the ancient Asian continental block. Vast regions of the Japan Island Arc, including the Ryukyu Arc, developed from accretions pertinent to the subduction during the Jurassic. Fossil and paleomagnetic evidence from the Shimanto Group suggests that subduction of a young oceanic plate occurred in the Late Cretaceous (about 70 Ma) to the Paleogene. Subduction and accretion may have stopped in late Eocene prior to the deposition of the Neogene-Quaternary Shimajiri Group.

=== Neogene-Quaternary ===
Deposition of continental shelf sediments (the Yaeyama Group) took place in Southern Ryukyu, which at the time was stable and had no crustal movement, during early Miocene. After a cessation of subduction around 10–6 Ma, the Philippine Sea Plate resumed subducting since the late Miocene (about 6 Ma), leading to back-arc spreading of the Okinawa Trough. Initial rifting of the northern Okinawa Trough may have caused a counterclockwise rotation in Northern Ryukyu and southern Kyushu after 6 Ma. Meanwhile, paleomagnetic data record a clockwise rotation of Southern Ryukyu after 10 Ma. Seismic reflection surveys indicate initial rifting of the southern part of the Okinawa Trough in the early Pleistocene, which gave rise to distinct tectonic processes, i.e., sedimentation, crustal doming, erosion, and subsidence. The emergence of the Ryukyu Arc, together with the subsidence of the Okinawa Trough, may have occurred in the late Pleistocene (1.7–0.5 Ma) after the development of the Shimajiri Group and before that of the Ryukyu Group. The back-arc rifting and associated sedimentation in the southern Okinawa Trough have continued since 2 Ma.

A study following the 2018 Hualien earthquake sequence show that the Ryukyu Arc may be kinematically connected to the northern Central Range in Taiwan. Shallow earthquake data shows that the offset in the northern Central Range follows the strike of the Ryukyu Arc, not the Longitudinal Fault Valley which is the suture between the Philippine Sea Plate and the Eurasian Plate, east out into the sea. Additionally, GPS data shows that the northern Central Range follows the motion of the Ryukyu arc to the south-east as opposed to the west like the rest of the mountain range.

== See also ==
- Izu–Bonin–Mariana Arc
- Geology of Taiwan
