= North Palawan Block =

Microcontinental block in the western Philippines

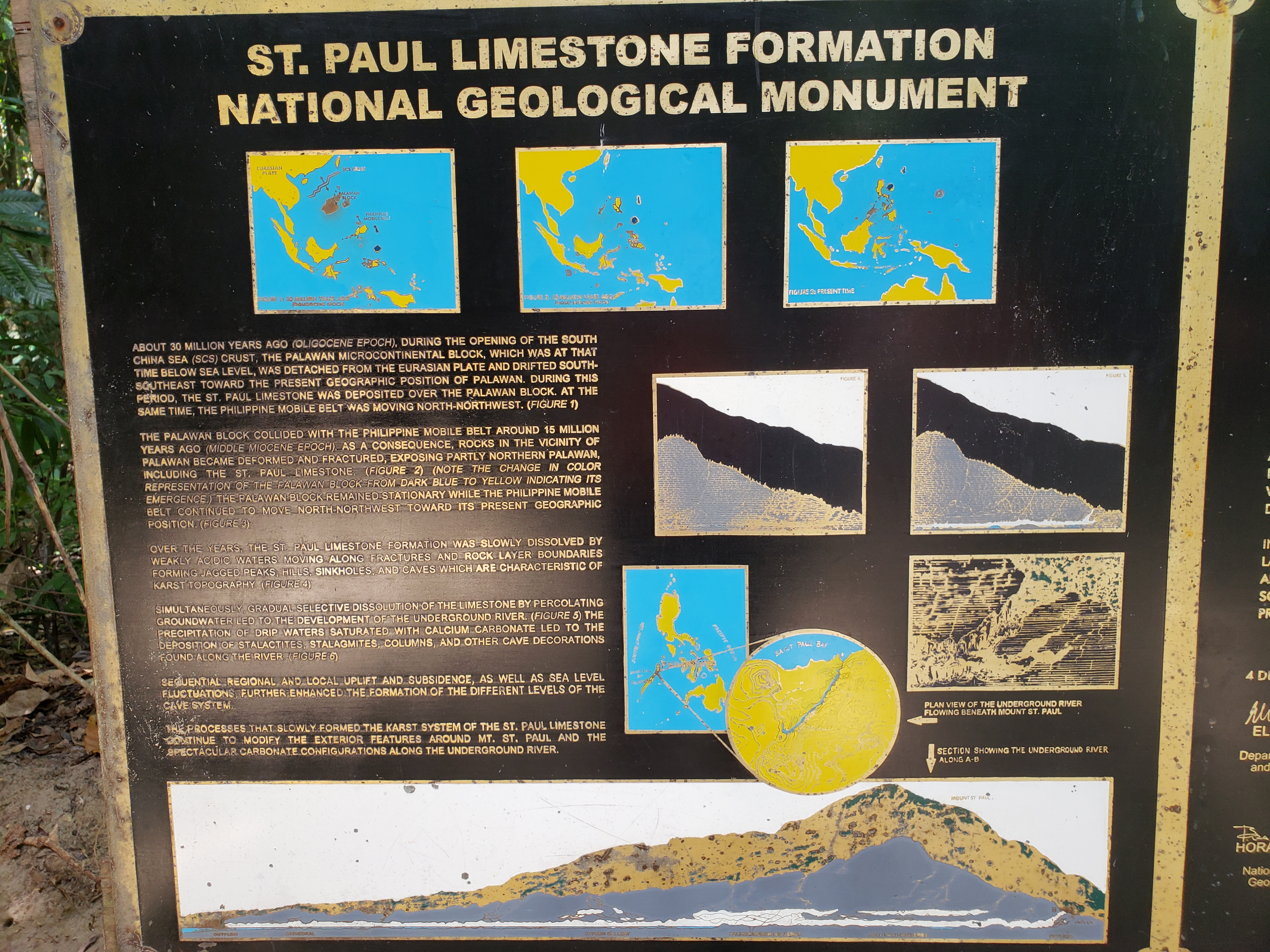
Puerto Princesa Subterranean River National Park marker describing the geologic history of Palawan

North Palawan Block is a microcontinental block situated in the western Philippines and the southern tip of the Manila Trench. The North Palawan block is considered to form the northeastern portion of a much larger area of block-faulted and foundered pre-Tertiary continental material which extends throughout the southern part of the South China Sea Basin and includes the Spratly Islands and the Dangerous Grounds area off Borneo (Hamilton, 1979). The evidence for the continental composition of the crust of this area is substantial and has been reviewed by Hamilton (1979) and Taylor & Hayes (1980) among others.

== Geology ==
The geology of the North Palawan Block includes terrane found on four islands: North Palawan, Romblon Island Group, Northeast Mindoro and Buruanga Peninsula. The stratigraphy found on Northern Palawan starts with the Middle Permian to Late Permian Bacuit Formation, a sequence of sandstone, altered tuff, calcareous sandstone, chert, and slate. It forms the base of the Malampaya Sound Group. Overlying is the Minilog Limestone, Liminangkong Formation, Late Triassic to Late Jurassic Coron Formation, which usually forms towering pinnacles, the Guinlo Formation, Paly Serpentinite, Caramay Schist, Conception Phyllite, Boayan Formation, Maytiguid Limestone, Late Oligocene-Early Miocene St. Paul Limestone, famous for the Underground River, the Kapoas Granite, Piedras Andesite, and then the Pliocene-Pleistocene Manguao Basalt.

The Romblon Island Group stratigraphic column starts with the Paleozoic Romblon Metamorphic Complex, overlain by the Carabao Sandstone, Pacul Limestone, Sibuyan Ophiolitic Complex, Tablas Volcanic Complex, Calatrava Quartz Diorite, Bailan Limestone, Binoog Formation, Anahao Formation, Banton Volcanic Complex, and the Late Pliocene Peliw Formation.

The Southwest Mindoro stratigraphic column starts with the Middle Jurassic-Early Jurassic Mansalay Formation, followed by the Agbahang Conglomerate, Caguray Formation, Bugtong Formation, Napisian Formation and Tangon Formation, Pocanil Formation, Punso Conglomerate, Famnoan Formation, Balanga Formation, and the Pleistocene Oreng Formation.

The Buruanga Peninsula stratigraphic column starts with the Late Paleozoic Buruanga Metamorphic Complex, Patria Quartz Diorite, Fragante Formation, and the Pliocene-Pleistocene Libertad Formation.

== See also ==
- Philippine Mobile Belt – Tectonic boundary
- List of stratigraphic formations in the Philippines
