= Lichi Formation =

Geologic formation in Taiwan

The Lichi Formation (Chinese: 利吉層; pinyin: Lìjí Céng) is a palaeontological formation located in Taiwan. It also called the "Liji Badlands" or the "Moon World of Liji".
