= Taixinan Basin =

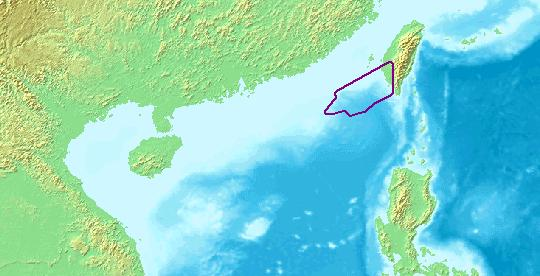
Map of the approximate location of the Taixinan Basin

The Taixinan Basin (Chinese: 台西南盆地; pinyin: Táixīnán Péndì), also called the Tainan Basin (Chinese: 台南盆地), and sometimes rendered literally as Southwest Taiwan Basin or Southwestern Taiwan Basin is a basin located in the southern Taiwan Strait and the northeastern South China Sea.

== Location ==
The Taixinan Basin is in the southern Taiwan Strait and the northeastern South China Sea. It is bordered by the Penghu Uplift (Chinese: 澎湖隆起) in the north, the Dongsha Uplift in the southwest, and the South China Sea basin in the south. It is separated from the Zhujiangkou Basin (Chinese: 珠江口盆地) by the Dongsha Uplift. In the northeast, it stretches inland onto the southwest Taiwan Island.

== Evolution ==
The Taixinan Basin is located on the continental shelf, on the margin of the continental crust. Its tectonic evolution can be divided in to three periods. The first period was from Paleocene to Oligocene. In the early Paleocene period, the Taixinan Basin experienced the effects of rifting which eventually caused the formation of the basin. The tensile stress field was in the NE-SW direction. Many normal faults developed during this period. The second period began at the end of Oligocene. During this period, the Taixinan Basin experienced the effects of compression. Part of the early normal faults underwent tectonic inversion leading to the development of reverse faults and related folds. The third period started during Miocene with thermal subsidence occurring. In the later Miocene, the South China Sea basin halted its expansion in a period where the sediment layers were horizontal and not controlled by the effects of faulting.

== Topography ==
The Taixinan Basin is in the direction of NE, with a length of about 400 km, average width of 150 km, and an area of more than 60000 km^{2}.

Within the Taixinan Basin, there are two depressions in the north and the south, separated by an uplift in the NE direction. The thickness of the Cenozoic sediments in the depressions can reach 8000 m, increasing from west to east. In the eastern part of the basin, the thickness of the sediments can reach 7000 m offshore Kaohsiung.

Onshore, on the southwest Taiwan Island, there is a distribution of normal faults of Paleogene.
