= Benham Rise =

Extinct volcanic ridge in the Philippine Sea

- Philippine Rise (Philippine official name); Talampas ng Pilipinas (Filipino); Kalipung-awan (Catanduanon)
- Location within Luzon Location within Philippines Location within North Pacific Location within Earth
- Location: Philippine Sea
- Nearest city: Ilagan, Philippines
- Coordinates: 16°30′N 124°45′E
- Area: 13,000,000 ha (50,000 sq mi)
- Designation: Protected food supply exclusive zone
- Designated: May 2017
- Governing body: Government of the Philippines (recognized by the United Nations since 2012)

The Benham Rise, formally designated as Philippine Rise (Filipino: Talampas ng Pilipinas) by the Philippine government, is an extinct volcanic ridge located in the Philippine Sea approximately 250 kilometers (160 mi) east of the northern coastline of Dinapigue, Isabela. The feature has long been known to the people of Catanduanes as Kalipung-awan, which literally means “loneliness from an isolated place”, since the precolonial era.

Under the Philippine Sea lie a number of basins including the West Philippine Basin, inside of which is located the Central Basin Fault (CBF). Philippine Rise is located in the CBF and its geologic basement is probably a micro-continent. Several scientific surveys have been made on the feature to study its nature and its impact on tectonic subduction, including one about its effects on the 1990 Luzon earthquake.

The Philippines claimed this feature as part of its continental shelf in a claim filed with the United Nations Commission on the Limits of the Continental Shelf on April 8, 2009, and which was approved under the United Nations Convention on the Law of the Sea (UNCLOS) in 2012. The rise is designated as a “protected food supply exclusive zone” by the Philippine government since May 2017. Mining and oil exploration are banned in the area as it is protected. The feature was renamed as "Philippine Rise" by Executive Order No. 25 on May 16, 2017 and by The Philippine Maritime Zones Act on November 8, 2024.

== History ==
=== Survey by Admiral Benham ===
The landform was presumably named after Admiral Andrew Ellicot Kennedy Benham (1832–1905) by American surveyors who probably studied the geological feature. He was a United States Navy officer, who served with both the South Atlantic and West Gulf Blockading Squadrons during the American Civil War.

=== Studies following the 1990 Luzon earthquake ===
There has been speculation in the scientific community about the nature of the landform. Following the major July 16, 1990 Luzon earthquake, scientists reconsidered their fault models and decided it likely that Philippine Plateau has similarly displaced the Philippine Fault System to the west. After analyzing older models such as that of Pinet and Stephan (1989), scientists reconsidered their fault models. They thought it highly likely that the Philippine Plateau is still displacing the Central Luzon and the Philippine Fault System to the west, which may have been a factor in such a catastrophic earthquake. The 20- to 50-second wave of the 1990 quake that developed a new east–west sub-fault was so strong that it terminated disastrously in the city of Baguio in Benguet, Cordillera. Several scientific surveys, conducted between 2004 and 2008, collected hydrographic data that determined the morphology of the seabed in the region.

=== United Nations recognition of the Philippine claim ===
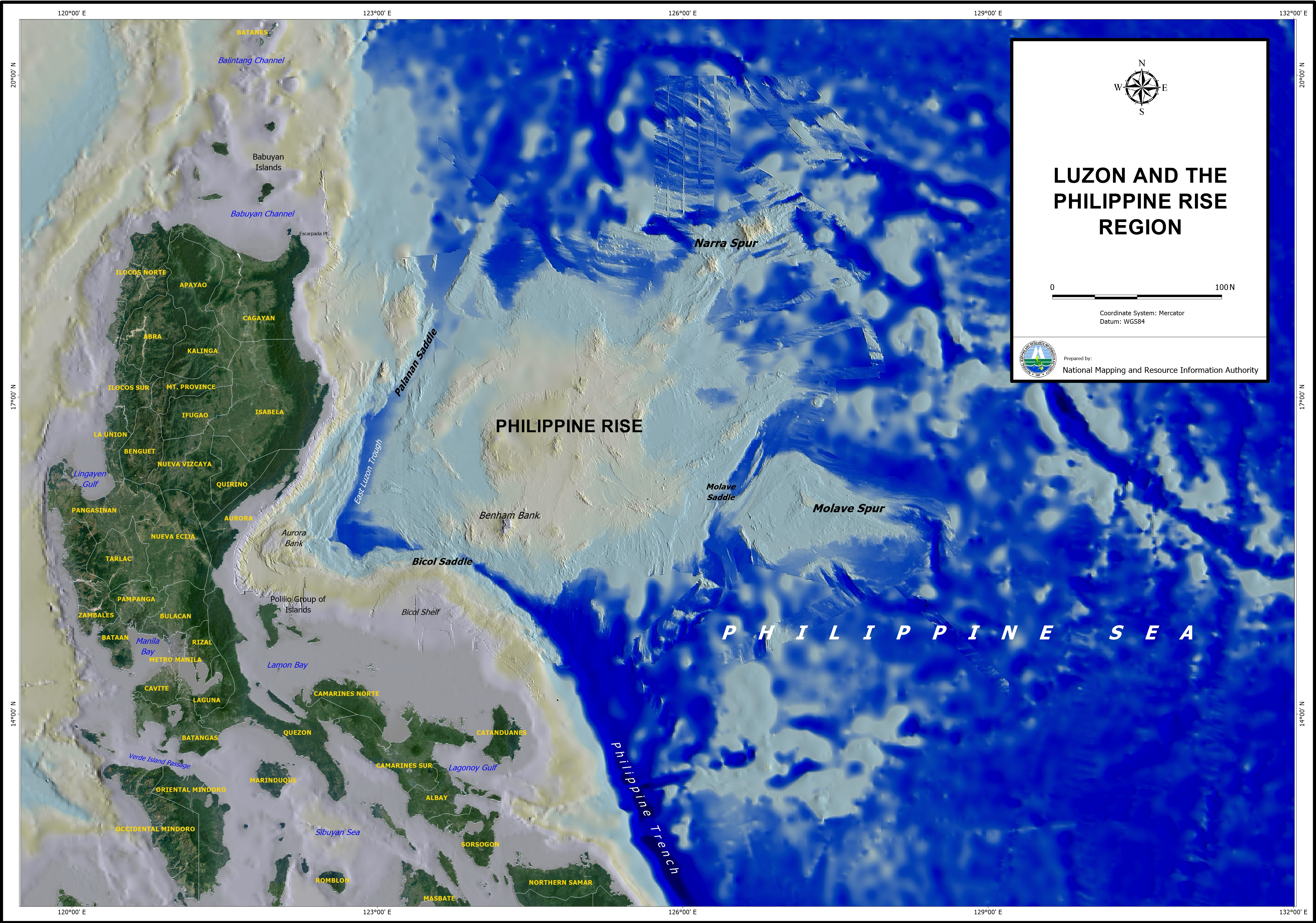
Map of Luzon and the Benham Rise (labelled under the Philippine official name, "Philippine Rise")

Despite its proximity to the archipelago, the portion of the undersea feature beyond the 200 nautical mile Exclusive Economic Zone was previously not included in charted territory of the country. On April 8, 2009, the Republic of the Philippines lodged a partial submission with the United Nations Commission on the Limits of the Continental Shelf to claim this portion as part of the country's extended continental shelf in relation to the continental shelf in the region of the Philippine Rise. It was submitted following the legislation of Republic Act No 9522 on March 10, 2009, which defined the country's archipelagic baselines.

Congress then enacted the bill of Senator Miriam Defensor Santiago, now known as Republic Act No. 9522, or the Archipelagic Baselines Law, as the basis of the claim. It asserted that, according to scientific data based on seismic, magnetic, other geological features, the Philippine Rise is an extension of the Philippines’ continental shelf.

The Philippines filed its claim for Benham Rise in 2008 in compliance with the requirements of the United Nations Convention on the Law of the Seas. The UN officially approved the claim in April 2012 under the administration of President Benigno Aquino III. It was the first claim of the Philippines approved by an international body since the colonial era.

After Chinese survey ships were spotted in the region in 2017, President Rodrigo Duterte suggested the plateau be renamed to emphasize Philippine sovereignty over the area. Soon after, the Department of Foreign Affairs announced plans for a new name, and in May 2017, the government officially adopted the name “Philippine Rise” for the feature designating the area as a “protected food supply exclusive zone” and banning mining and oil exploration. This angered China, which maintained the Philippines has no sovereign rights or sovereignty over the Philippine Rise, despite the UN-backed 2012 international ruling saying otherwise.

=== Chinese research and naming of features in 2018 ===
China-named features on the Philippine Rise
1 Jinghao Seamount
2 Tianbao Seamount
3 Cuiqiao Hill
4 Jujiu Seamount
5 Haidongqing Seamount

In January 2018, Philippine Congressman Gary Alejano revealed how the Department of Foreign Affairs had approved a scientific survey of the Rise by the Chinese Institute of Oceanology of the Chinese Academy of Sciences, together with the Marine Science Institute of the University of the Philippines.

In February, Duterte‘s Secretary of Agriculture Emmanuel Piñol told media the President had ordered the halting of all foreign research in the Philippine Rise; however, that conducted by the Chinese Academy of Sciences was already finished two days before the order.

On February 12, 2018, the International Hydrographic Organization approved the names proposed by China for five features in the Philippine Rise, after China had submitted its findings to the organization. The names given by China were all in Chinese, namely, Jinghao Seamount (some 70 nautical miles east of Cagayan), Tianbao Seamount (some 70 nautical miles east of Cagayan), Haidonquing Seamount (east at 190 nautical miles), Cuiqiao Hill, and Jujiu Seamount, the last two forming the central peaks of the Philippine Rise undersea geological province. The Chinese naming of the features was met public protests in the Philippines. Malacañang Palace announced its objection and non-recognition of the Chinese names, adding it will appeal for their deletion with the International Hydrographic Organization. The government also said the Philippine embassy in Beijing will coordinate with the Chinese government on the issue. The Palace announced the following day that government intended to give Philippine names to the features of the Philippine Rise. However, a few hours later, Presidential Spokesperson Harry Roque clarified that China’s renaming of sea features “was a scientific process and not a political one”, adding “Whoever made the discovery gets to decide what these are called.”

On February 16, the Philippine government announced they have sent military personnel into the Cagayan Valley to guard the Rise. Two days later, it was revealed that China intended to name a total of 142 features. On February 26, the Department of Foreign Affairs stated during a Senate investigation that China actually surveyed the Rise in 2017, without any Philippine-issued permit, citing the lack of capability to detect illegal entry.

=== Discovery of Apolaki Caldera ===
The world’s largest caldera, with a diameter of 150 kilometers was discovered by Jenny Anne Baretto, a Filipino marine geophysicist. It was named after Apolaki, a precolonial Tagalog solar and war deity.

== Geology ==
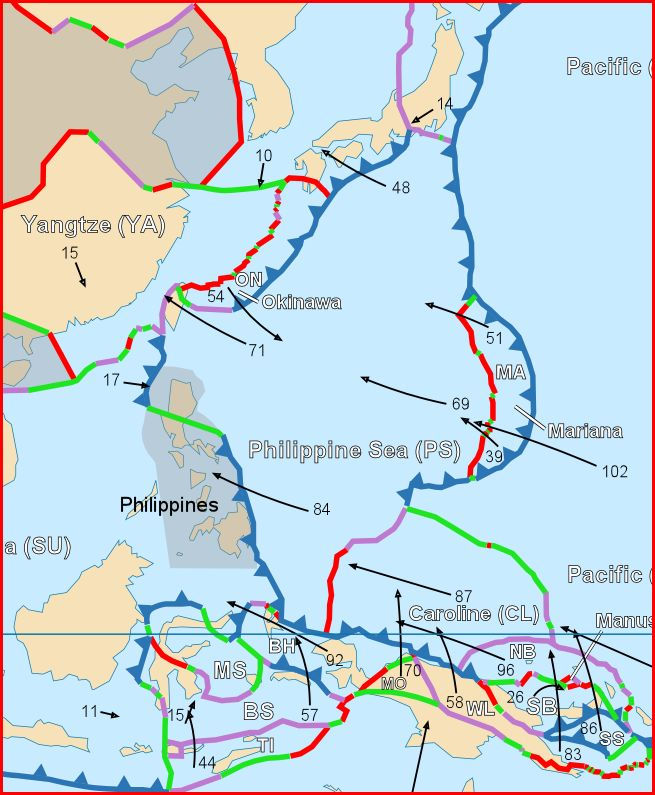
The map shows the features of the Philippine Sea Plate.

Philippine Rise is a submerged extinct volcanic ridge located at 16.5°N, 124.7°E off the coast of Luzon, with the size of about 250 km in diameter and rises over 2,000 meters (2 km.) above the sea floor, from below 5,000 meters (5 km.) below sea level to above 3,000 meters (3 km.) below sea level. Its area is close to the Philippine Seamount, located at 15.8°N, 124.2°E. The precise location is somewhere near the east of the Philippine Trench and near the south of the East Luzon Trench, both of which absorb the subducting force of the Philippine Sea Plate under the Philippine Mobile Belt, a collage of large blocks of that crust that amalgamated prior to the collision of the Philippine Sea Plate with the Eurasian Plate.

The origin of the landform, along with the nearby Urdaneta Plateau (a remnant of a mantle plume), is identified in one study as at least five sequences of propagating rifts, probably triggered by mantle flowing away from the mantle thermal anomaly. Its presence of the landform disrupts the continuity of this region (known as the Philippine-East Luzon Trench) by continuously colliding with the Sierra Madre mountain range of eastern portion of the island of Luzon. Though it is generally thought that the Philippine Sea Plate is being subducted under the Philippine Mobile Belt, under the rules of tectonic subduction, there appears to be a resistance to this because of the presence of the landform, and instead, the plate is being displaced into the northern portion of Luzon to the west.

The geophysical features of the plateau may have been the result of an early Miocene collision event between the Philippine Rise and the eastern margin of Luzon, which may have also allowed the inception of the NW striking strand of the Philippine fault. These forces may have impacted the shape of the island of Luzon because of the basaltic sea floor resisting the subduction that may have also cause the bending of the Philippine Fault. The active basins in Central Luzon, which trace an asymmetrical V shape, is the best place to observe recent tectonic evolution of the fault system.

The Benham Bank is the shallowest point of the Philippine Rise.

== Cultural and strategic significance ==
The Philippine Rise has long been part of Filipino culture, particularly of people native to Catanduanes who have explored and fished the area long before the colonial era. Called Kalipung-awan (roughly translated from the Bikol languages as “loneliness in an isolated place”) is celebrated in Catandunganons literature, and a large portion of fish caught in the region come from the waters covering the Philippine Rise. Its poetic name come from fisherfolk who spend days in the vast and lonely waters seldom visited by other ethnic groups. Its location east of Luzon, southeast of Taiwan, and west of the United States territory of Guam also makes gives it strategic geopolitical importance.

In May 2017, the feature was designated by the Philippines as a “protected food supply exclusive zone”, prohibiting mining and oil exploration. To commemorate the first anniversary of the Philippine government’s renaming of the feature, 500 square kilometers (190 sq mi) of the feature was declared a “Strict Protection Zone” reserved exclusively for scientific research, while about 3,000 square kilometers (1,200 sq mi) was designated a “Special Fisheries Management Area“.
