= AFT =

AFT or aft may refer to:

== Arts and entertainment ==
- AFT (album), 1978, by Joanne Brackeen
- American Film Theatre
- American Folklore Theatre or Northern Sky Theater, musical theatre company
- Aryan Fraternity of Texas, fictional organisation in the American television series Lethal Weapon

== Organisations ==
- American Farmland Trust
- American Federation of Teachers
- American Film Theatre
- Applied Food Technologies

== Science, technology, and mathematics ==
- Accelerated failure time model, in survival statistics
- Adiabatic flame temperature
- Amniotic fluid test, in medicine
- Applied Food Technologies
- Automatic fine tuning, in radio
- Autonomous flight termination, in rocketry
- Axial flux technology

== Other uses ==
- Afghanistan Time, time zone
- Afitti language, spoken in Sudan (ISO 639: aft)
- Afternoon
- Aft, nautical term meaning 'towards the stern (rear) of the ship'
- Afutara Airport in Malaita Province, Solomon Islands (IATA airport code AFT)
- American Flat Track
- American Freedom Train
- Ancestry Family Tree, genealogy software program

== See also ==
- Americans For Fair Taxation (AFFT)
