= Seafood mislabelling =

Intentional food mislabelling

Seafood species can be mislabelled in misleading ways. This article examines the history and types of mislabelling, and looks at the current state of the law in different locations.

== History in the United States ==
Proper species identification of seafood has been important to consumers since ancient times. The Jewish dietary laws, known as kashrut, require the Jews to identify certain types of fish to maintain a kosher diet. Kashrut does not require rabbis to "bless" fish to make it kosher, but rather to identify the features the fish must have to meet kosher requirements (among others) and confirm their existence.

In the 13th century, the King of England passed first law concerning proper labelling requirements, the Assize of Bread and Ale, regulating weight and quality of bread and ale. These laws were codified in the colonies, being a part of Britain, in some form. For instance, in 1758, the Georgia Legislature passed the Act for Regulating the Assize of Bread requiring bakers to make an identification mark on their bread to show a source of origin, among other rules. Fines were imposed by the statute for lacking this labeling requirement, even if the bread conformed in all other manners.

However, although the United States and each State had adopted the common law of Britain, the regulations on bread did not last long in the colonies. Because bakers in the colonies were subject to the free-market forces of supply and demand, unlike the bakers' monopolies of the Old World, the colonial bakers began to protest the burdens of these laws and they were eventually repealed once independence was declared. One prominent protest in Massachusetts laid out the economic differences of the colonies and the Old World as a plea to remove these requirements. While the gist of these protests focused on the pricing restrictions, some were directed toward the labeling requirement as well.

After just over a century as a nation, the United States began to recognize, once again, the need to regulate food packaging. In 1898, the Association of Official Agricultural Chemists established a Committee on Food Standards headed by Harvey W. Wiley and thereafter states began incorporating these standards into their food statutes. In the US, the Lacey Act of 1900 provided for criminal and civil penalties for transporting certain species of wildlife in commerce. While the Lacey Act was directed toward conservation efforts, the law also created a de facto labeling requirement for certain types of products, such as fish.

The first direct statutory regulation of food labeling did not take effect until 1 January 1907. The 59th Congress of the United States passed, and President Theodore Roosevelt signed into law, the nation's first act regulating food and safety, The Pure Food and Drug Act of 1906 (34 U.S. Stats. 768). The Pure Food and Drug Act, which was initially created to ensure products were labeled correctly, also prohibited interstate commerce of misbranded and adulterated foods. Under this statutory authority, one of the most famous cases was a federal misbranding suit against Coca-Cola, claiming that "Coca-Cola" was "misbranded" because the product no longer contained "coca" as an ingredient.

However, the 1906 Act had a number of problems. In 1938, the Federal Food, Drug, and Cosmetic Act (52 US Stat. 1040) was signed into law by Franklin D. Roosevelt replacing or updating most of the 1906 Act. The 1938 Act provides much of the statutory framework that exists today. In 20 chapters, this Act defines food, among other regulated areas, and proper food labeling. For instance, 21 USC § 403, Misbranded Food, states, "A food shall be deemed to be misbranded: (a) (1) If its labeling is false or misleading in any particular… (b) If it is offered for sale under the name of another food." Seafood is, thus, misbranded if the package claims to contain one species of fish but actually contains another species of fish that would mislead.

Although the 1938 Act provides the structural framework for labeling laws in the United States, statutory updates and additions have been made. For instance, in 1966, Fair Packaging and Labeling Act was passed requiring all consumer products in interstate commerce to be honestly and informatively labeled, with FDA enforcing provisions on foods. The Food Quality Protection Act (FQPA), or H.R.1627, was passed unanimously in 1996 by Congress and signed into law by President Bill Clinton, regulating the use of certain chemicals on commodity foods. All of these laws were enacted for the health, safety and welfare of the consumer.

Federal statutes are usually broad and require federal agencies or federal courts to define the scope, boundaries and definitions of the statutory language. In the case of seafood labeling, the FDA created the Guide to Acceptable Market Names for Seafood Sold in Interstate Commerce. The Guide provides guidance on which types of fish labels would be correct descriptions of certain fish species and which labels would be misleading. The market label for specific species of fish can be found on the FDA's Seafood List website. The FDA explains the history of how this list evolved:

Through the years, the Federal Government has worked to provide consistent and scientifically sound recommendations to industry and consumers about acceptable market names for seafood sold in interstate commerce. This advice was consolidated in 1988 when The Fish List was first published by FDA in cooperation with the National Marine Fisheries Service to provide a source of names that would facilitate consistency and order in the U.S. market place and reduce confusion among consumers. Although The Fish List had significant success in achieving its goal, its usefulness was limited because it did not include invertebrate species. In 1993, The Fish List was revised to include the acceptable market names for domestic and imported invertebrate species sold in interstate commerce, and renamed The Seafood List. The Seafood List provides information to assist manufacturers in properly labeling seafood and to reflect the acceptable market names of new species introduced into the U.S. marketplace.

The list allows multiple different species of certain fish to be marketed under the same market name. For instance, the FDA lists 14 species of fish that can be labeled as "tuna". The list does not allow, however, common substitutes to be listed as the fish they are commonly substituted as. For instance, escolar, the most common substitute for tuna in retail locations, is not one of the fish legally allowed to be labeled as "tuna". These market names were created both for the safety of the consumer and to prevent economic fraud.

== Species identification ==
Because filleted fish are often visually indistinguishable, having lost their skin, fins, and other identifying marks, molecular methods provide the only means of exact identification of fish. Visual taxonomic identification of specific animal species by those who are not expert taxonomists, even if they are identifying whole animals, is inaccurate and difficult. Three molecular targets to test for species identification exist: protein, DNA, and RNA. However, for forensic testing using DNA is considered to be more accurate (by increasing discriminating power).

DNA testing provides a reproducible means of differentiating one species from another. DNA testing was originally developed using microsatellite regions that vary within a species, but do not readily change from generation to generation. DNA and RNA tests were further developed using DNA barcoding to differentiate different species of organisms from each other, while ensuring each organism within a species is properly grouped. Thus, using the barcode method, a lab can identify any species of fish, even without their visual characteristics, as long as the fish has previously been sequenced.

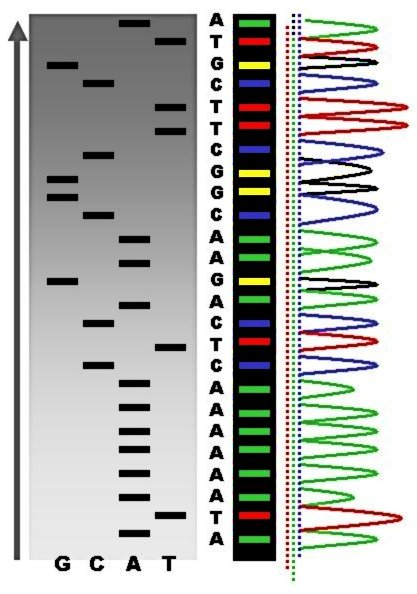
Results from an automated chain-termination DNA sequencing

=== Taxonomic validation ===
In the late 2000s, as DNA sequencing became more accessible, so did the error rate in public DNA databases. As late as 2010, the US General Accounting Office reported, "Public databases seldom use validated fish standards and thus are likely to contain incomplete and/or inaccurate DNA sequences." The authors of "What can biological barcoding do for marine biology?" explain the reason U.S. Government believes "validated fish standards" are important:

Linking DNA sequences to specimens in museum collections is therefore critical for the success of barcoding. The deposition of voucher specimens will ensure that all results entered into GenBank or a similar database can be checked and corrected. Voucher specimens are not a requirement by GenBank today, which is a known problem as errors are frequently discovered in the submissions without any possibility of checking the original material.

The FDA, agreeing with the need to insure a vouchered and taxonomically validated reference is used, maintains the requirement that only validly authenticated standards be used to make regulatory decisions. In order to help the industry comply with labeling requirements, FDA has worked with the international research effort The Fish Barcode of Life campaign "FISH-BOL" to catalog the world's fish and make the sequences publicly available. The FDA states, "Once completed, the FISH-BOL database will enable a fast, accurate, and cost-effective system for molecular identification of the world's icthyofauna." But, as of today, because FISH-BOL "is not currently searchable against only vouchered species with authoritative taxonomic identifications" this database cannot currently be used for regulatory compliance testing because "FDA will only make regulatory decisions based on identifications using adequately authenticated standards." The BOL project a great research tool, but BOL is not designed to be a regulatory database. "Anyone can put sequences in the BOL," says Jonathan Deeds, FDA research biologist and project head. "Most are good, but there are also a small number of guesses." Thus, because Genbank and Fish Barcode of Life databases do not exclusively include only taxonomically validated references, they cannot be relied on for regulatory compliance testing in the US.

== Seafood substitution ==
Seafood substitution occurs when "one species of fish, crustacean or shellfish is sold as another species". Aside from the numerous health risks that are associated with mislabeled fish, seafood substitution is also a form of economic fraud. Economic fraud occurs when a lower-priced fish is labeled as a higher priced fish in order to sell the lower-priced fish for a higher price. Once someone within the supply chain sells mislabeled seafood, every company or consumer that purchases the mislabeled seafood is a victim of this economic fraud. In certain species, mislabeling can be quite substantial, such as in a 2007 study of red snapper in sushi restaurants in Chicago, where none of the 14 samples of "red snapper" tested were, in fact, red snapper. In 2008, two high school students did a study and found that one-fourth of the fish samples with identifiable DNA were mislabeled. In a 2011 two-part study, the Boston Globe tested 183 samples from retailers across the Boston area and found 87 were sold with the wrong species name (48 percent), including 24 of the 26 red snapper samples, mentioning many retailers by name. Less than a week after the Boston Globe report, international consumer advocate group Consumer Reports magazine released the results of a study they planned to release in their December 2011, issue which further discussed the extensive amount of mislabeling seen at retail.

In 2013, the international organization Oceana published an alarming report on a two-year investigation on seafood fraud within the U.S. Over one-third of the collected and analyzed seafood samples were mislabeled. Particularly snapper and tuna were the fish species with the highest mislabeling rate. With 74 percent, sushi restaurants had the worst level of mislabeled fish.

Mislabeling is not just occurring in the US. In Canada, a study found 34 of 153 fish samples from grocery stores were mislabeled. In Ireland, scientists found that 28% of cod products in Ireland are mislabeled and 7% are mislabeled in Britain. In a study conducted by the Australian government, 32 of 138 (23%) fish samples were incorrectly labeled. Australia found that food service companies (e.g. restaurants) had the highest level of mislabeling with 24 out of 67 (35.8%) samples mislabeled, 5 out of 44 (11.3%) samples from retailers (e.g. fishmongers, supermarkets) mislabeled and 1 out of 24 (4%) samples from wholesalers were mislabeled. The Australian study makes sense because certain amounts of mislabeling can occur at each step in the distribution process.

Mislabeling was also found in tuna cans in a large European study funded by Greenpeace. In this study, they found 30.3% of the tuna cans displayed a different species in the can than on the label or a mixed species of fish within the cans. However, the Greenpeace study was conducted based on EU labeling rules and would likely have produced a lower mislabeling rate under US law. For instance, Greenpeace considered mixing of two species within a single can to be mislabeling, which may be a violation of EU law. However, in the U.S. while 'albacore' must be a specific species of fish, 'light tuna' can refer to a few other tuna species that are not albacore. There are numerous differences between European and U.S. law that require knowledge of these laws to ensure proper labeling in both countries.

In 2019, a meta-analysis was published in the journal Biological Conservation that characterized seafood mislabeling globally. By analyzing over 140 studies, the authors demonstrated that efforts to document mislabeling are highly skewed toward certain taxa and geographies, and sampling practices are often problematic for estimating mislabeling rates. Using statistical modeling, they produced mislabeling estimates for seafood products, supply chain locations, product forms, and countries, along with the uncertainty of estimates, which is often significant. The majority of products, for which there is sufficient data, had mislabeling estimates lower than commonly reported. The most credible average mislabeling rate at the product-level was 8% (95% HDI: 4–14%). The authors make the important point that low mislabeling rates do not necessarily translate to no impacts; rather, mislabeling rates must combined with other data in order to understand the extent and potential consequences of mislabeling. The results of the meta-analysis are available to the public at the website Seafood Ethics, which is dedicated to providing evidence-based and transparent information on seafood mislabeling and fraud to promote ocean and food sustainability.

Mislabeling is often assumed to be driven by an incentive for economic gain: the desire to label a lesser value product as a higher value one. However, evidence for the causes of mislabeling are largely limited to anecdotes and untested hypotheses. Another meta-analysis was published in 2019 evaluating the evidence for an overall mislabeling for profit driver for seafood fraud. Using price data from mislabeling studies, the authors estimated Δmislabel (i.e., the difference between the price of a labeled seafood product and its substitute when it was not mislabeled). They failed to find any strong evidence for a widespread mislabeling for profit driver for seafood; rather, Δmislabel was highly variable. Some species, such a sturgeon caviar, Atlantic Salmon, and Yellowfin Tuna had a positive Δmislabel, and may have the sufficient characteristics to motivate mislabeling for profit. Atlantic Bluefin Tuna and Patagonian Toothfish had a negative Δmislabel, which could represent an incentive to mislabel in order to facilitate market access for illegally-landed seafood. Most species had price differentials close to zero—suggesting other incentives are likely influencing seafood mislabeling. This potential list is long: the need for the appearance of constant supply, confusing naming practices and policies, informal supply chains, and mixed fisheries.

For instance, a recent US Government study estimated that US fishing activities had an estimated 17% bycatch, which is the discarded catch from fishing activities, such as protected species, non-marketable species, etc. A species that may be discarded in the US may be a marketable fish in another nation. Thus, commonly included substitutes may sometimes be species of fish that are caught in the same areas and are legally co-marketed in the country of origin.

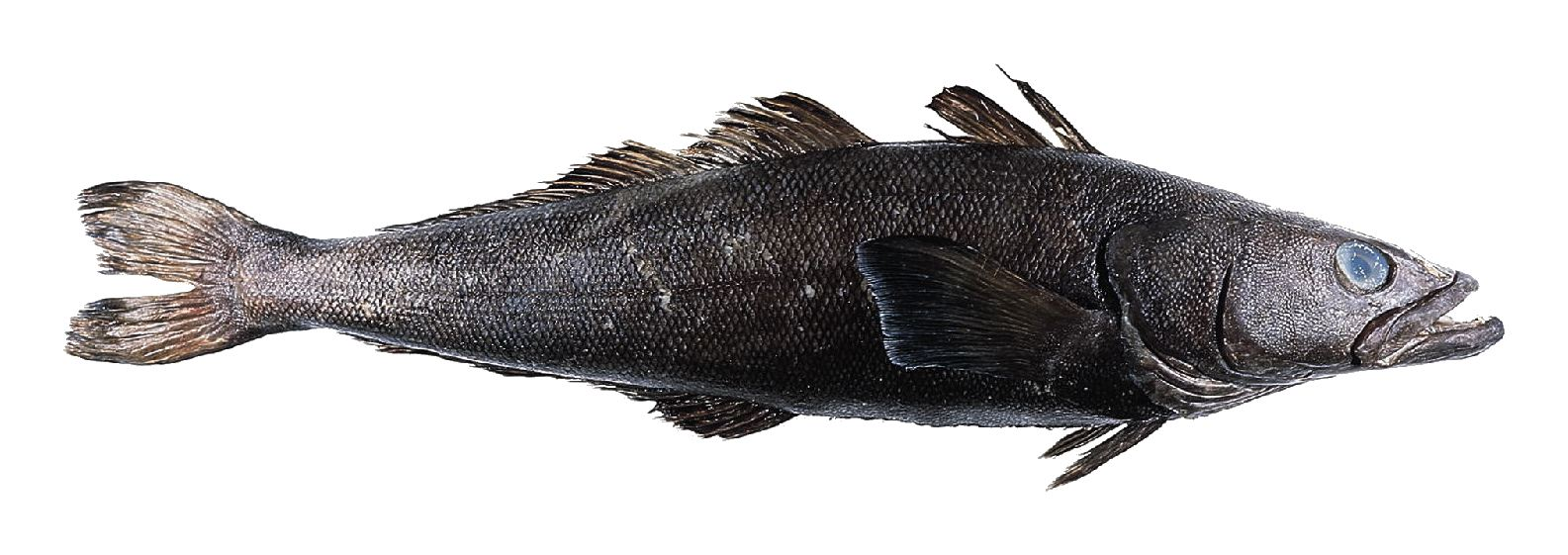
The Patagonian toothfish is marketed in the US under the name "Chilean sea bass" to make it attractive to the American market.

The market name for species varies widely from nation to nation as well. The FDA details what types of product descriptions are acceptable in the U.S. and provides a list of what species of fish can be sold under certain market names in the US. However, the same fish can be sold under any number of names around the world. For instance, Patagonian toothfish (Dissostichus eleginoides), also known in the U.S. as Chilean sea bass, may be labeled as Merluza negra in Argentina and Uruguay, Bacalao in Chile, Mero in Japan, Légine australe in France, Marlonga-negra in Portugal, and Tandnoting in Sweden. The Chileans were the first to market toothfish commercially in the United States, earning it the name Chilean sea bass, although it is really not a bass and it is not always caught in Chilean waters. Chilean sea bass is a different species type than the sea bass caught in U.S. waters and is not allowed to be labeled as such. Thus, sometimes what might be a proper name in one country is not proper in the US. However, this would still likely be considered economic fraud under US law, even if unintentional, because the US consumer is confused as to the product being sold.

The largest Federal investigation related to economic fraud resulting from seafood mislabeling came after import alert 16-128 was issued. The U.S. Food and Drug Administration held up every Chinese catfish load when it arrived to verify that they were genuine channel catfish (Ictalurus punctatus), rather than other Asian species, such as basa, tra, panga, swai and sutchi. The FDA hired Applied Food Technologies to analyze the DNA of all detained catfish from China.

The species of seafood being sold is not the only form of economic fraud. The label of "wild-caught" fish to describe fish grown in aquaculture would be mislabeling of the fish, even if they were of the same species, because this misleads the consumer.

== Overstating quantities ==
Section 402(b) of the Federal Food Drug and Cosmetic Act (FD&C Act) prohibits the adulteration of food by adding any substance (such as ice glaze) to increase its bulk or weight. Section 403(e)(2) of the FD&C Act and section 4(a)(2) of the Fair Packaging and Labeling Act require food to bear an accurate statement of the net quantity of contents. Overstating the net quantity of contents (such as including the weight of ice glaze) misbrands the products under these sections. Violations of this kind could be criminally prosecuted under the FD&C Act as felonies since they are committed with the intent to defraud or mislead.

== Legal consequences of mislabeling ==
Mislabeling, also known as misbranding under US law, is enforced under several different Federal statutes as well as some state statutes. The Federal statutes include: Federal Food, Drug, and Cosmetic Act (FD&C Act), Sec. 403. [21 USC §343] Misbranded Food, Food Allergen Labeling and Consumer Protection Act of 2004 (Public Law 108-282, Title II), Lacey Act, Fair Packaging and Labeling Act, Public Health Security and Bioterrorism Preparedness and Response Act of 2002, and the Tariff Act of 1930 (19 U.S.C. § 1592), Section 592. A number of U.S. states enforce their own mislabeling laws. Mislabeling is also illegal in the European Union, Australia, and Canada, among others.

Testing to identify the species of fish sold in commerce in the US does not appear to be mandatory under US law, but rather facilitates compliance with the law by ensuring the proper species are being sold through a company's supply chain. For these reasons, some companies have decided to implement voluntary testing programs. For instance, Sysco maintains a "one strike and you're out" policy that ends contracts with fish suppliers that sell wrongly labeled grouper, and US Food Service's Jorge Hernandez said in an interview, "food testing ensures that the product they're selling is the product they say they're selling".

The FDA announced on 3 November 2011, that they had begun using DNA methods for testing seafood for species mislabeling.

== Risks to the consumer ==
Mislabeled seafood can create serious health risks, including conditions which may even be fatal. Three common health risks include substituting escolar for tuna, ciguatera and scombroid food poisoning. Mislabeled seafood may also harm pregnant women who are told to avoid certain species of fish during pregnancy. However, according to a recent Congressional Research Service report, seafood mislabeling is widespread. A recent report by the consumer advocacy group Oceana reported that mislabeling can be as high as 70% in certain species of fish, although certain species are more commonly misidentified than others. Health and safety risks occur because consumers are unable to purchase certain seafood products to protect themselves against these risks based on the product label.

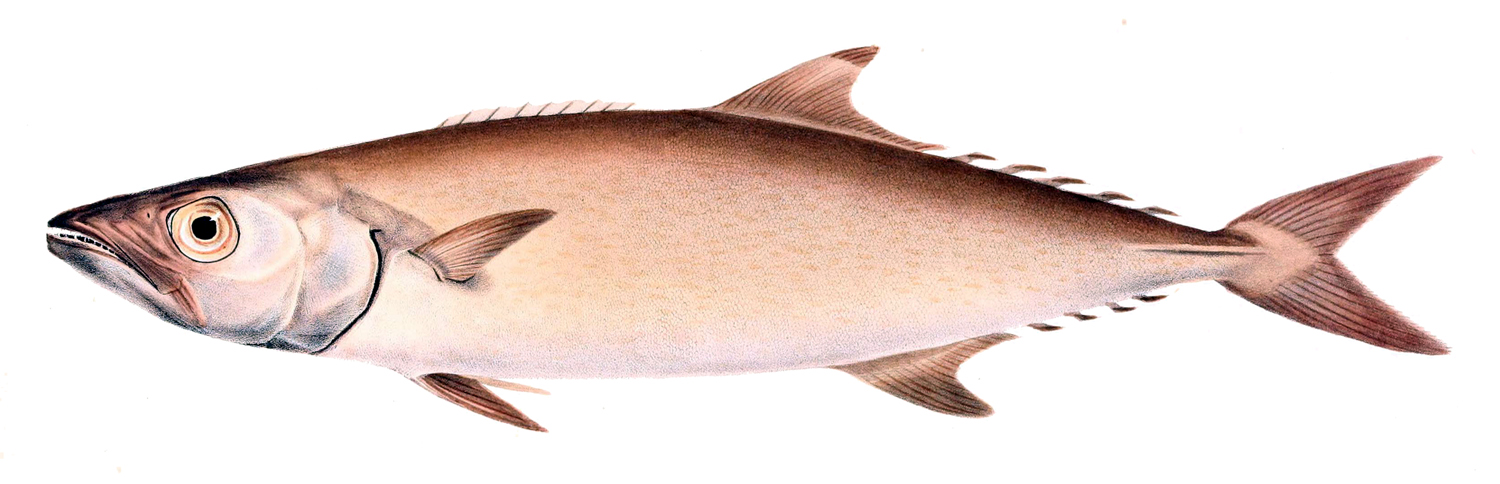
Escolar has the potential for toxic side effects and Italy and Japan have banned it from sale. However, in the US restaurants have been found marketing escolar as "white tuna".

=== Substituting escolar for tuna ===
Escolar is commonly substituted for tuna in sushi restaurants. Escolar, which is much less expensive than tuna, is a fish with a diet high in wax esters. Since these wax esters are not digestible, they have a laxative effect in humans. The laxative effect is not merely an inconvenience, but can be very serious. Although not affecting all people, the wax esters are indigestible in humans and to those susceptible can cause constipation, followed by severe oily diarrhea (keriorrhea), rapid loose bowel movements, with onset 30 minutes to 36 hours after consumption. In fact, the FDA recommends, "Escolar should not be marketed in interstate commerce" and the Hawaiian Legislature is considering legislation to ban escolar for the same reasons. However, multiple studies have shown that a sushi restaurant advertising a "white tuna" is more likely to be selling escolar than any fish allowed to be labeled as "tuna" according to the FDA. In the US, 'white tuna' is identified as albacore tuna (Thunnus alalunga) by the US Food and Drug Administration.

=== Ciguatera ===
A very common foodborne illness in fish is ciguatera, which is caused by eating certain reef fishes whose flesh is contaminated with toxins. The CDC states the following about Ciguatera:

Ciguatera fish poisoning (or ciguatera) is an illness caused by eating fish that contain toxins produced by a marine microalgae called Gambierdiscus toxicus. People who have ciguatera may experience nausea, vomiting, and neurologic symptoms such as tingling fingers or toes. They also may find that cold things feel hot and hot things feel cold. Ciguatera has no cure. Symptoms usually go away in days or weeks but can last for years.

Because the toxins are very heat-resistant, consumers cannot protect themselves by cooking these contaminated fish. When fish are collected from certain areas known to contain these toxins and are mislabeled, consumers may be seriously injured. Although there is a treatment for the disease, the disease is not often properly diagnosed and the treatment is most effective if administered within 72 hours of exposure. Avoiding the species of fish known to contain the disease or avoiding eating fish from locations known to have the disease are the only preventative measures.

=== Scombroid ===
Scombroid food poisoning is syndrome resembling an allergic reaction that occurs within a few hours of eating fish contaminated with scombrotoxin. Scombroid poisoning derives its name from the family of fish most commonly associated with the disease, the family Scombridae (tuna, mackerel, skipjack and bonito). Fish outside Scombridae have been found to cause scombroid fish poisoning, including mahi mahi, bluefish, marlin, and escolar. When these fish are not refrigerated properly, bacteria can metabolize naturally occurring histamines in these fish to produce scombrotoxin. To prevent illness in these species of fish, ensuring the proper storage conditions of the fish from water to plate is of utmost importance. Freezing, cooking, smoking, curing and/or canning do not destroy Scombroid toxins. Thus, lack of proper species knowledge can make it difficult to ensure proper storage conditions both for suppliers and consumers of fish.

=== Mercury ===
Pregnant women are warned against eating certain fish during pregnancy. Most notably, the fish not recommended for consumption during pregnancy are shark, tilefish, swordfish, and king mackerel. When people eat the types of fish that are high in methylmercury, it can accumulate in the blood stream over time and may take over a year for the levels to drop significantly. Thus, it may be present in a woman even before she becomes pregnant. Thus, women who are trying to become pregnant should also avoid eating certain types of fish well before they become pregnant. Because these fish can be substituted for other fish, however, consumers may have a difficult time avoiding these species of fish.

=== Anaphylaxis ===
Food allergies to fish, unlike most allergies, often begin in adulthood. The greatest risk from fish allergies is anaphylaxis, which can cause life-threatening breathing, cardiac, and gastrointestinal symptoms. Pollock, salmon, cod, tuna, snapper, eel, and tilapia are among the fish that commonly elicit fish allergies. People often determine which fish to which they have allergies and avoid those types of fish. However, with common substitution of certain fish, avoiding certain species of fish can be difficult.

== Antimicrobials in aquaculture ==
The cells of bacteria (prokaryotes), such as salmonella, differ from those of higher-level organisms (eukaryotes), such as fish. Antibiotics are chemicals designed to either kill or inhibit the growth of pathogenic bacteria while exploiting the differences between prokaryotes and eukaryotes in order to make them relatively harmless in higher-level organisms. Antibiotics are constructed to act in one of three ways: by disrupting cell membranes of bacteria (rendering them unable to regulate themselves), by impeding DNA or protein synthesis, or by hampering the activity of certain enzymes unique to bacteria.

Antibiotics are used in aquaculture to treat diseases caused by bacteria. Sometimes the antibiotics are used to treat diseases, but more commonly antibiotics are used to prevent diseases by treating the water or fish before disease occurs. While this prophylactic method of preventing disease is profitable because it prevents loss and allows fish to grow more quickly, there are several downsides.

The overuse of antibiotics can create antibiotic-resistant bacteria. Antibiotic-resistant bacteria can spontaneously arise when selective pressure to survive results in changes to the DNA sequence of bacteria allowing that bacteria to survive antibiotic treatments. Because some of the same antibiotics are used to treat fish that are used to treat human disease, pathogenic bacteria causing human disease can also become resistant to antibiotics as a result of treatment of fish with antibiotics. For this reason, the overuse of antibiotics in treatment of fish aquaculture (among other agricultural uses) could create public health issues.

The issue has two sides. In some foreign countries, clean water supplies for aquaculture are extremely limited. Untreated animal manure and human waste are used as feed in shrimp farms and tilapia farms in China and Thailand, in addition to the collection of waste products accumulating from inadequate sewage treatment. In order to prevent the spread of bacteria and disease in contaminated water, some foreign fish farms put U.S.-banned antibiotics into their fishmeal. However, because the more stringent growing regulations in the US increase the price of food, imports from nations without these regulations are increasing based on price and profit.

Between 1995 and 2005, the first ten years of the NAFTA-WTO era in the US, seafood imports increased 65 percent and shrimp imports increased 95 percent. Today, 80 percent of American seafood is imported, about half coming from aquaculture. China, Thailand and Vietnam together account for 44 percent of seafood imports into the United States.

The FDA has been testing for chemicals in aquaculture products for over two decades. In November 2005, the testing program for aquaculture drugs was revised to include antibiotics such as chloramphenicol, fluoroquinolones, nitrofurans, and quinolones, as well as antimicrobial compounds like malachite green that are not approved for use in aquaculture fish. From 1 October 2006, through 31 May 2007, FDA tested samples of catfish, basa, shrimp, dace, and eel from China, finding twenty-five percent of the samples to contain drug residues. FDA has approved five different drugs for use in aquaculture as long as the seafood contains less than a mandated maximum residue limit: florfenicol, sulfamerazine, chorionic gonadotropin, oxytetracycline dihydrate, oxytetracycline hydrochloride, as well as a drug combination of sulfadimethoxine and ormetoprim. FDA has approved two drugs—formalin and hydrogen peroxide—for which it has not set a tolerance.

The FDA now enforces regulations in the US requiring testing of certain imported products for antimicrobial agents under Import Alert 16-131. The Import Alert provides that the use of antimicrobials during the various stages of aquaculture, including malachite green, nitrofurans, fluoroquinolones, and gentian violet, may contribute to an increase of antimicrobial resistance in human pathogens and that prolonged exposure to nitrofurans, malachite green, and gentian violet has been shown to have a carcinogenic affect. In a consumer brochure, the FDA describes the reasoning for enforcement under the import alert:

After FDA repeatedly found that farm-raised seafood from China was contaminated, the agency announced on June 28, 2007, a broader import control of all farm-raised catfish, basa, shrimp, dace(related to carp), and eel from China. During targeted sampling, from October 2006 through May 2007, FDA repeatedly found that farm-raised seafood from China was contaminated with antimicrobial agents that are not approved for use in the United States. More specifically, the antimicrobials nitrofuran, malachite green, gentian violet, and fluoroquinolones, were detected.

Due to limitations on funding and resources, U.S. Government Accountability Office states that only 1% of seafood, compared with 2% of all imports, is inspected and only 0.1% of all seafood is tested for antibiotic residue.

=== Malachite green ===
In 1983, the FDA banned the use of malachite green in aquaculture. Toxicity studies have shown that this chemical can have serious toxic side effects. Malachite green is not actually an antibiotic, but has antibiotic properties. Malachite green is somewhat stable within the environment and, therefore, is detectable in fish that were treated with the chemical at some point even after treatment has discontinued. After more stringent testing and inspection by the governments of Western Countries, the use of malachite green began to wane and other drugs began to become more prevalent.

=== Chloramphenicol ===
While the U.S. has tested farm-raised shrimp for chloramphenicol since 1994, over the last decade the FDA developed a more sensitive testing methodology and changed the levels of detection for chloramphenicol in response to increasing discovery of traces of chloramphenicol in imports. In response to the US discovery of chloramphenicol in imported shrimp and subsequent increased testing sensitivity, the use of this compound in aquaculture began to decrease.

=== Gentian violet ===
Gentian violet, also known as crystal violet has antibacterial, antifungal, and antiparasitic properties. This compound was used during the World War I era as a topical antiseptic, but has been replaced in modern times with more modern treatments. The FDA prohibits the use of gentian violet in aquaculture because of numerous studies showing increased risk of certain cancers related to the compound and a showing that the chemical is bioavailable in fish when used in aquaculture.

=== Nitrofurans ===
Nitrofurans are broad spectrum antibiotics, being effective against Gram-positive and Gram-negative bacteria. In 1991, the FDA withdrew several approved food animal nitrofuran products as a result of research showing nitrofurazone, one of the nitrofurans, can produce mammary tumors in rats and ovarian tumors in mice. The FDA also concluded that some people may be hypersensitive to this product. The FDA states, "Absolutely, no extra-label use of the nitrofurans is permitted in any food animals, including seafood." The FDA currently detains certain seafood imports without physical examination due to nitrofuran use by the producer.

=== Fluoroquinolones ===
Fluoroquinolones have been prohibited from extra-label use in the U.S. and many other parts of the world in aquaculture because of public health concern about the development of such antimicrobial resistance. Chinese authorities have acknowledged permitting the use of fluoroquinolones in aquaculture, even though the use of fluoroquinolones in food animals may increase antibiotic resistance in human pathogens compromising the effectiveness of the use of this critically important class of antibiotics in human medicine. The Chinese government has established a higher maximum residue limit than the US and research in China has shown that the Chinese are effectively meeting the Chinese limits. Because of concerns about the presence of fluoroquinolones in the food supply, not only in aquaculture, but also in foods like honey, the U.S. is continuing to develop methods and strategies to detect illegal residues and prevent their introduction into the U.S. food supply.

== See also ==
- Applied Food Technologies
