= Sibuyan Sea Fault =

Major geological fault in the Philippines

The Sibuyan Sea Fault is a part of the Philippine Fault System, a major inter-related system of geological faults throughout the whole of the Philippine Archipelago. This fault system is primarily caused by tectonic forces compressing the Philippines into what geophysicists call the Philippine Mobile Belt.

The Sibuyan Sea Fault is located offshore north of Masbate. It is relayed with the Verde Passage Fault, both left-lateral faults, by an aborted spreading center. This fault is almost entirely offshore or is covered by Quaternary or Recent volcanic rocks. It leaves the known Philippine fault northeast of Masbate Island, passes along the northeast edge of the Sibuyan Sea southwest of the Bondoc Peninsula, passes northeast of Marinduque Island, apparently passes through the Taal Volcano, and then offshore west of the Batangas Peninsula. The Sibuyan Sea branch is 350 km long and is presently active.

Focal mechanism solutions of earthquakes in the Sibuyan Sea area indicate a north-west striking left-lateral fault with a significant normal component to the north-east. The latest earthquake in this area occurred in June 2004. The Philippine and Sibuyan Sea faults are “forearc sliver” faults that accommodate oblique convergence between the Philippine Sea and Sunda plates.
