= Philippine fault system =

Philippine geological feature

The Philippine fault system is a major inter-related system of geological faults throughout the whole of the Philippine Archipelago, primarily caused by tectonic forces compressing the Philippines into what geophysicists call the Philippine Mobile Belt. Some notable Philippine faults include the Guinayangan, Masbate and Leyte faults.

== Philippine Mobile Belt ==
The Philippine Mobile Belt is composed of a large number of accretionary blocks and terranes. These terranes are long and narrow like the Zambales ophiolites which is at least 400 km long and 50 km wide. The strips generally run north–south and the zones of convergence are usually demarcated by fault lines. The Philippine Mobile Belt is compressed on the west by the Eurasian plate and two arms of the Sunda plate, and on the east by the Philippine Sea plate. These tectonic plates have compressed and lifted parts of the Philippines causing extensive faulting, primarily on a north–south axis. All faults in the Philippines are inter-related by the tectonic forces of the Philippine Mobile Belt, or its tectonic induced volcanism. A more complete understanding can be gained by viewing the faults in the Philippines as an inter-related Philippine fault system.

== Philippine Fault Zone ==
The Philippine Fault Zone (PFZ) extends 1200 km across the Philippine archipelago behind the convergent boundary of the Philippine Trench and the subduction of the Philippine Sea plate. This left-lateral strike-slip fault extends NW-SE (N30 – 40 W) accommodating the lateral oblique motion of the subducting Philippine Sea plate with respect to the Philippine Trench. It extends from Davao Gulf in the south, bisects the Caraga region at the Agusan River basin, crosses to Leyte and Masbate islands, and traverses Quezon province in eastern Luzon before passing through Nueva Ecija up to the Ilocos region in northwest Luzon. The northern and southern extensions of the PFZ are characterized by branching faults due to brittle terminations. These horsetail faults are indicative of the lateral propagation and further development of the PFZ. The fault's current activity can be observed in Holocene sandstone outcrops on the Mati and Davao Oriental islands. The fault experiences a slip rate of approximately 2-2.5 cm/year.

== Formation ==
It is proposed that the Philippine Trench and PFZ represent a 'shear partitioning' mechanism, where the oblique physical motions of subduction at the convergent zone resulted in the development of the major strike-slip fault. In the Philippine Sea, the oblique motion of the subducting Philippine Sea plate resulted in the formation of the Philippine trench and the PFZ back arc fault system. The oblique motion is accommodated by two vector components; one vector perpendicular to the converging Philippine Trench and one vector parallel to the PFZ. Approximately 30% of the oblique motion is accommodated by the PFZ while the remaining proportions are displaced along other regional tectonic features as the Philippine Sea plate currently subducts below the Philippine archipelago at a rate of 6–8 cm/year. These two tectonic features thus correlate to a similar time of development. The formation of the PFZ was a result of two stages. The first stage began at ~10 Ma, when the northern segments of the PFZ developed due to the convergence of the China Sea Crust underneath the nearby Manila Trench. The lack of accretionary prism at the Philippine Trench is suggestive of young origin correlating to an early second stage of development (2–4 Ma) with the central PFZ proposed to have developed between 2.7 and 3.8 Ma.

== Earthquakes ==
The central Philippine Fault Zone consisting of the Guinayangan, Masbate, and Central Leyte faults are the most seismically active regions transecting the islands of Bondoc to Leyte. The northern and southern extensions of the Philippine Fault Zone experience infrequent earthquakes and often described as locked segments which are capable of larger magnitude earthquakes. The largest (M7.0) and most destructive earthquakes are generated along the Guinayangan fault every 30–100 years with slip rates of 20–33 mm/year as determined by GPS and historical records. Moderate earthquakes (M3.0–5.0) are observed along the Masbate fault with frequent aftershocks indicative of continued displacement and regional slip of 5–35 mm/year. The northern and southern segments of the Central Leyte fault experiences different seismic activity dependent on regional geology. While the Southern Central Leyte fault experiences moderate seismic events, the Northern Central Leyte fault creeps at approximately 25 mm/year. Historical data on the PFZ is limited due to the faults geographical location predominantly offshore, lack of complete paleoseismic data and lack of permanent Global Positioning System (GPS) that can trace movements over long periods of time.

== Other active fault systems ==
- Marikina Valley Fault System – A major active fault system in the Philippines that runs through parts of Metro Manila and nearby provinces. It consists of two main segments: West Valley Fault which active and potential generate of strong magnitude earthquake and East Valley Fault which shorter segment located from the east side.
- Lubang-Verde Passage fault system – located offshore between Batangas peninsula and Mindoro Island, following the northwest–southeast alignment of Verde and Lubang islands (thus the name) and essentially strike-slip (left-lateral) fault.
- Mindoro/Aglubang Fault – break in slope between mountainous western Mindoro and the flat lands of eastern.
- Sibuyan Sea Fault – located offshore north of Masbate; using bathymetric and paleomagnetic data gathered in the northern section of the Sibuyan Sea, Sarewitz and Lewis (1991) were led to conclude that the Sibuyan Sea Fault is relayed with the Verde Passage Fault, both left-lateral faults, by an aborted spreading center under a transtensional tectonic regime.
- Legaspi Lineament – long SE-trending linear feature emanating from Pasacao in the Ragay Gulf area, passing through Lake Bato then to Legaspi City and considering its morphological prominence and seismic activity, it deserves to be elevated in category from a less significant lineament to a fault.
- Tablas Lineament – tectonic boundary between the North Palawan microcontinental block and the western edge of the Philippine Mobile Belt. It trends northerly as it separates Buruanga peninsula from the Antique Range in Panay Island, and passes offshore northwards east of Tablas Island. The present geodynamic setting of the Philippines obliges the Tablas Lineament to operate as a right-lateral strike-slip fault. Its structure appears to connect with the Negros Trench southwards.
- Mindanao Fault – a prominent NW-trending linear fracture zone on the western third of Mindanao Island and has 2 distinct segments, including that which separates the Daguma Range from the Cotabato Basin corresponding to the Cotabato Fault segment. This segment is highly linear and has features suggestive of normal faulting although it may have been a left lateral strike slip fault during its early history. The Quaternary Mt. Parker volcano is located at the western end of this fault and, on radar images, seems to be cut by the fault and terraces formed by Quaternary limestone mark the Daguma Range. These, together with the young morphology of incised river valleys, suggests a young age for the fault along which the Daguma Range was uplifted. Although Quaternary in age, it still has to be ascertained whether the fault is active or not. The Sindangan Fault segment represents the northern continuation of the fault towards northern Zamboanga. Focal mechanism solutions of earthquakes offshore and narrow shear zones transecting recent gravel deposits suggest active left-lateral faulting.

== Gallery ==
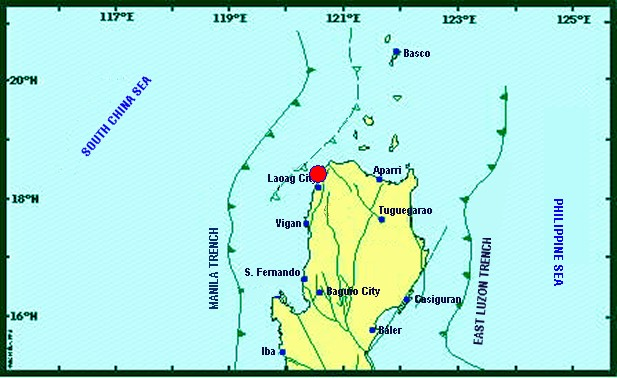
Tectonic Map of Far Northern Philippines including the Philippine Fault System

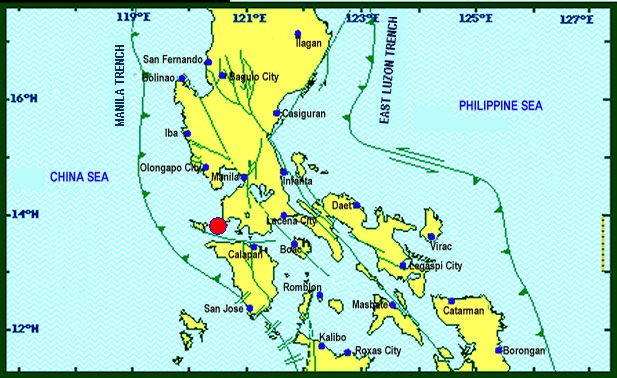
Tectonic Map of Northern Central Philippines including the Philippine Fault System

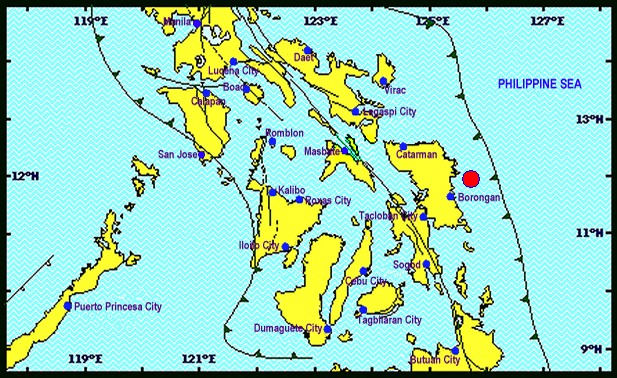
Tectonic Map of Central Philippines including the Philippine Fault System

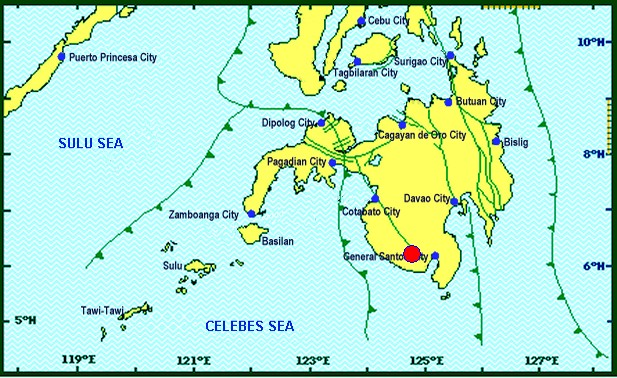
Tectonic Map of Southern Philippines including the Philippine Fault System

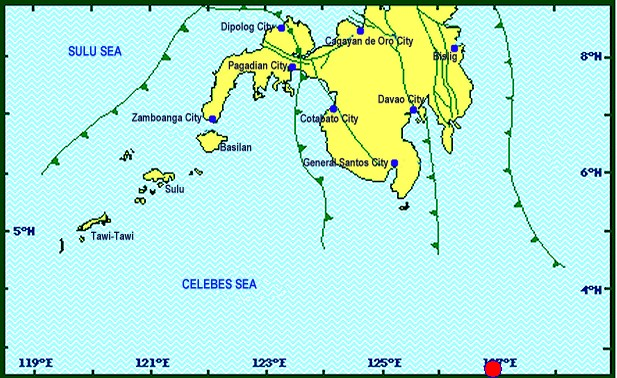
Tectonic Map of Far Southern Philippines including the Philippine Fault System

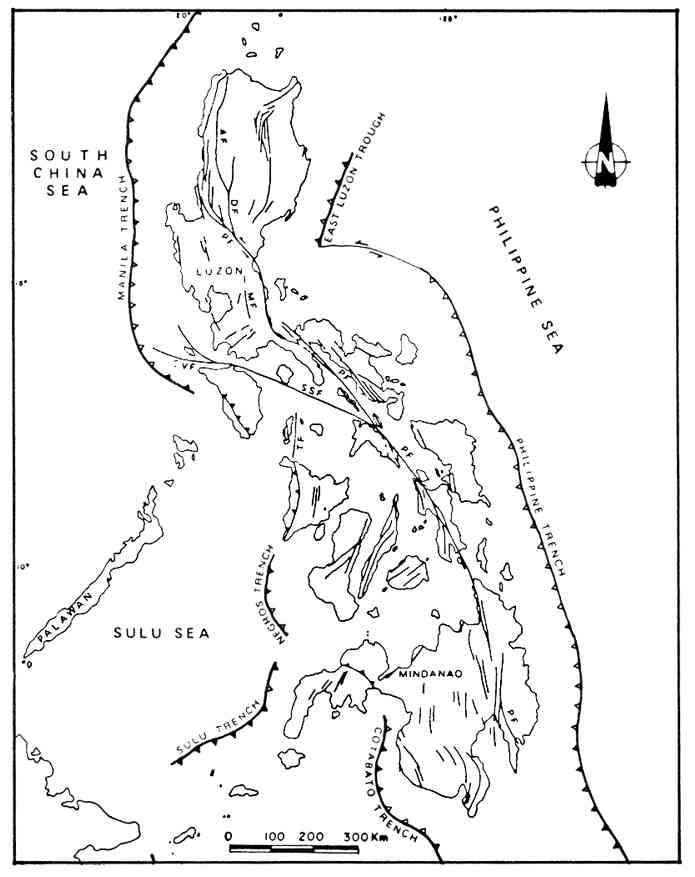
Tectonic diagram showing Philippine Fault System

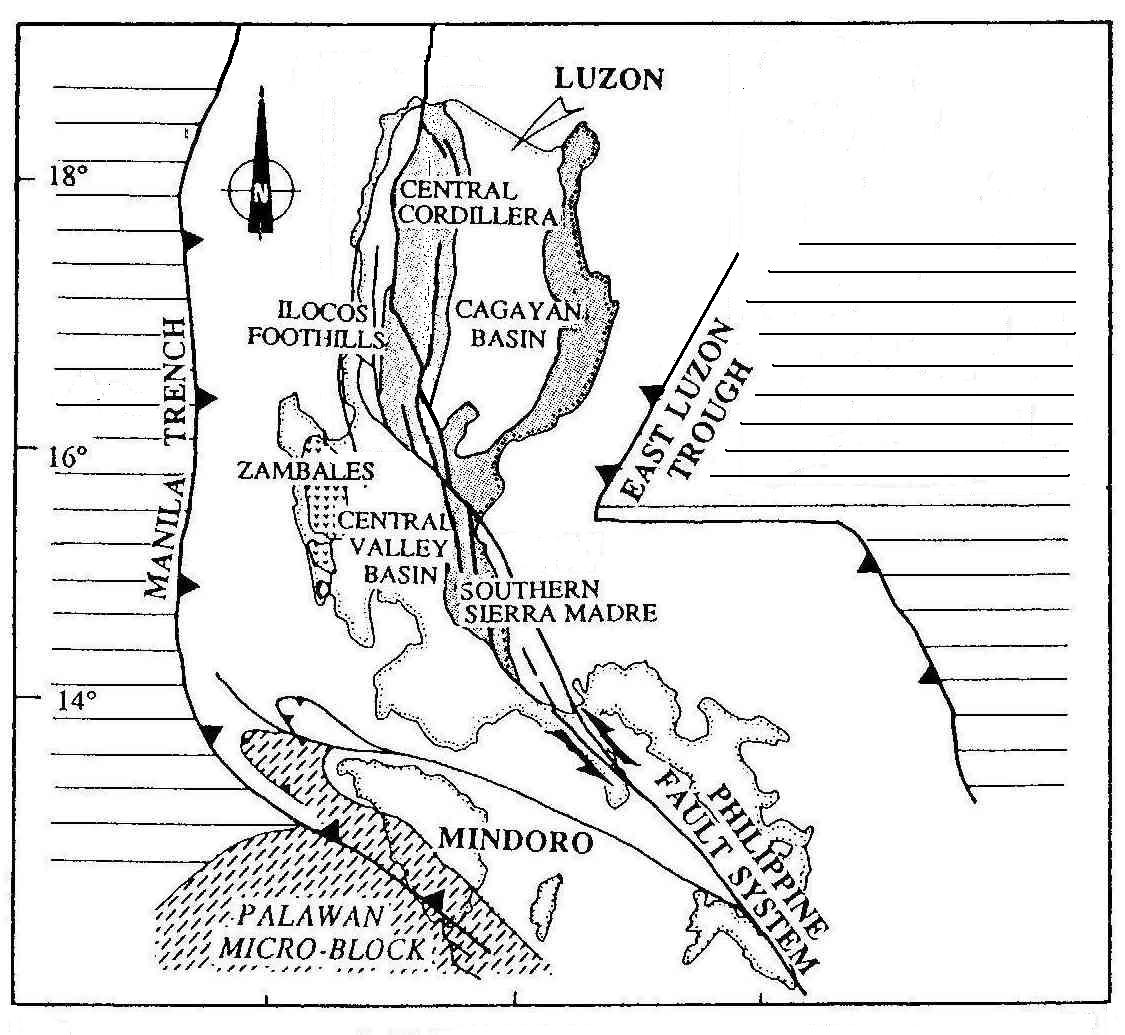
Diagram of Northern and central sections of the Philippine Fault System

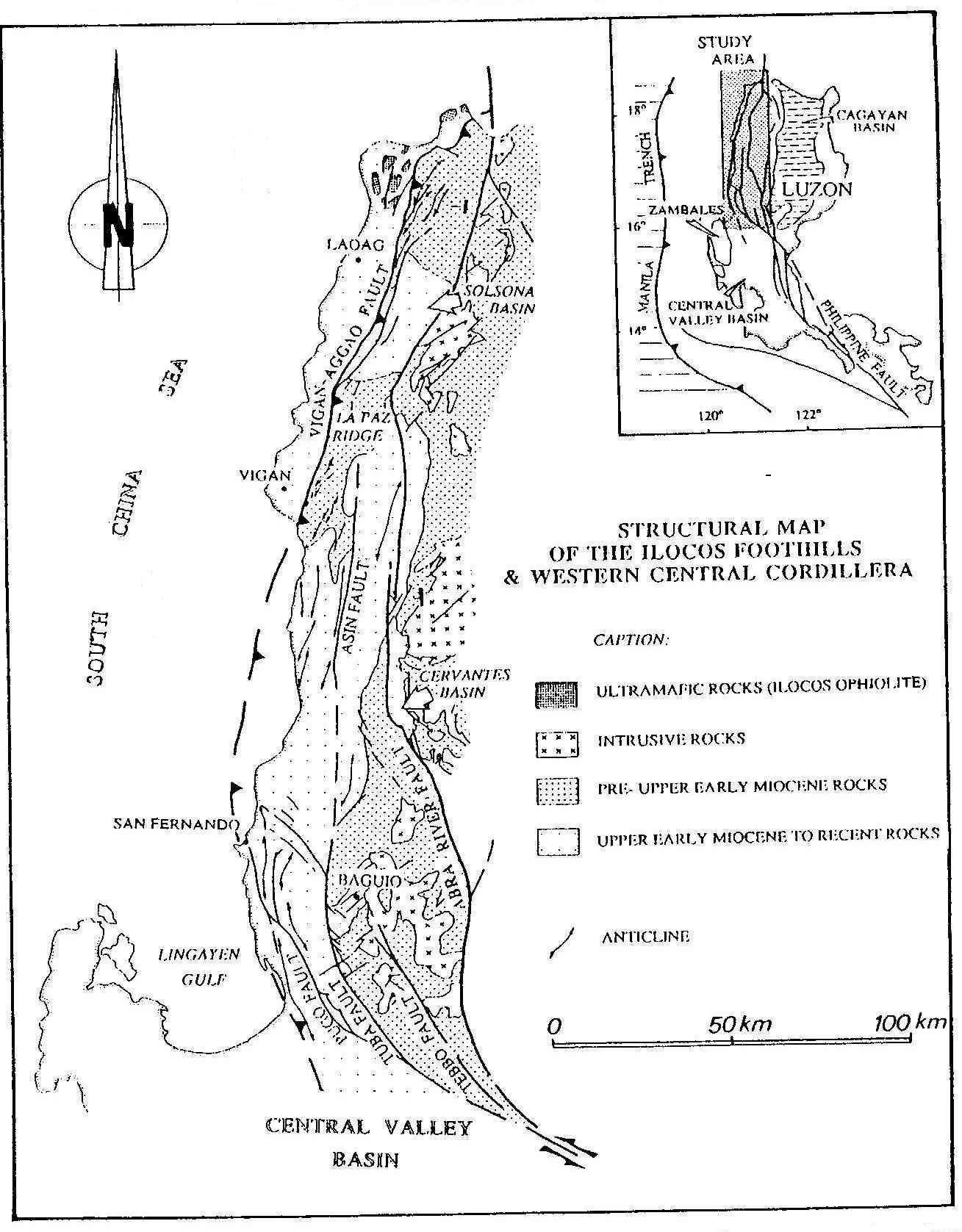
Diagram of Northwest Luzon section of Philippine Fault System

== See also ==
- Molucca Sea Collision Zone
- Marikina Valley fault system
