= West Philippine Basin =

The West Philippine Basin, is the oceanic crust located underneath the western part of the Philippine Sea. It was formed during the early Oligocene epoch. To its southwest is the Philippine Trench, and to its east is the Kyushu–Palau Ridge. The West Philippine Basin is deeper and older than the eastern basins and has crustal heat-flow values approaching that of old oceanic crust. It is roughly bisected by the Central Basin Fault zone which comprises a band of high relief running from the northwest corner to the Kyushu–Palau Ridge near 14°N. Characterized by the presence of several submarine plateaus (Benham Rise and Anami and Oki-Daito Ridges).

== Genesis ==
In terms of origin, two models distinguished:

=== Trapped oceanic basin ===
Trapped basin occurs in two stages: Emplacement of an oceanic basin and Individualization/isolation of the oceanic crust from the rest of the basin. It was invoked by Uyeda and Ben-Avraham (1972); Hilde and others (1977) and Hilde and Lee (1984) and suggests West Philippine Basin as a trapped piece of the Pacific plate. Envisioned a N–S trending transform fault (connecting two ridges, the Kula Pacific Ridge and the Philippine Ridge/Central Basin Fault as turning into a subduction (the proto-Mariana Trench) zone following a change in the Pacific plate's motion from NNW to WNW during the Eocene. In this model, the basin is originally a part of the Pacific plate which was isolated during the kinematic reorganization 43 Ma.

=== Back-arc basin evolution ===
Formed behind a subduction zone and involves process that creates an extensional regime oriented perpendicular to the subduction zone. First proposed by Karig (1971), shows the WPB as forming by back-arc spreading behind the Oki-Daito Ridge starting the Eocene. Crustal extension within the plate took place successively in the eastern portion of the plate to form the other inter-arc basins. Supporters include: Lewis et al. (1982); Seno and Maruyama (1984), Rangin et al. (1990); Hall et al. (1995); Lee and Lawyer (1995), and Deschamps (2002); Honza and Fujioka (2004); Queano et al. (2006).

== See also ==
- Philippine Sea plate
