= Oceana (conservation organization) =

Nonprofit ocean conservation organization

- Established: October 2001; 24 years ago
- Type: Social welfare organization
- Legal status: 501(c)(3) non-profit group
- Headquarters: Washington, D.C., U.S.
- Methods: Lobbying, litigation, and research
- CEO: James Simon
- Revenue: $43,967,787 (2022)
- Staff: 285 (2022)
- Volunteers: 18,406 (2022)
- Website: Oceana.org

Oceana, Inc. is a 501(c)(3) nonprofit ocean conservation organization focused on influencing specific policy decisions on the national level to preserve and restore the world's oceans. It is headquartered in Washington, D.C., with offices in Juneau, Monterey, Fort Lauderdale, New York, Portland, Toronto, Mexico City, Madrid, Brussels, Copenhagen, Geneva, London, Manila, Belmopan, Brasília, Santiago, and Lima, and it is the largest international advocacy group dedicated entirely to ocean conservation.

Currently, Oceana has a staff of about 200 and 6,000 volunteers, and it has almost 50 million dollars of revenue (as of 2017). Oceana takes a multi-faceted approach to ocean conservation; It conducts its own scientific research in addition to making policy recommendations, lobbying for specific legislation, and filing and litigating lawsuits.

== History ==
Oceana was established in 2001 by an international group of leading foundations including the Rockefeller Brothers Fund, Sandler Foundation, and The Pew Charitable Trusts. This followed a 1999 study they commissioned, which found that less than 0.5% of all resources spent by U.S. environmental nonprofit groups were used for ocean conservation.

In 2001, Oceana absorbed The Ocean Law Project, which was also created by The Pew Charitable Trusts, for Oceana's legal branch. In 2002, American Oceans Campaign, founded by actor and environmentalist Ted Danson, merged with Oceana to further their common goals of ocean conservation.

On April 19, 2024, Oceana, Inc. announced the appointment of James Simon as the new chief executive officer. Simon, previously the President of Oceana, succeeded Andrew Sharpless following an eight-month international search.

== Oceana Canada ==
In 2015, Oceana Canada was established as a legally distinct non-profit organization. It works in collaboration with Oceana, inc. and is considered part of the larger charity. Except under very specific circumstances, Canadian charity law does not grant either legal charity status or the ability to issue tax exempt receipts to Canadian offices of non-Canadian nonprofits, making it beneficial to create an independent, Canadian charity.

== Current campaigns ==
=== Responsible fishing ===
Concerned about declining fish catches since 1980, Oceana is committed to combating overfishing and restoring the world's fisheries. It mainly focuses on legislation for scientific based catch limits, which have led to dramatic recoveries of depleted fisheries in the recent past. It also opposes fishing subsidies, which it argues are (in their current form) contributing to overfishing. Oceana also focuses on reducing bycatch, especially of protected or endangered species.

Oceana's main focus with sustainable fishing is providing clean, plentiful food. They often cite the lack of emissions or resources, like land or fresh water, that wild fish require, and that this lack of pollution or resources would be necessary to feed the world's growing population. This campaign is called "Save the Oceans, Feed the World".

=== Plastics ===
Oceana focuses on curbing or eliminating the use of plastics, especially single use plastics due to their harmful impact on marine ecosystem and on human consumers. The organization generally opposes focusing on recycling or cleanup, and it says this is due to inefficiencies of recycling the large amounts of plastics in the ocean.

=== Seafood fraud ===
Oceana has put a major focus on exposing and advocating against seafood fraud. Its opposition comes from the widespread nature of this problem, the negative health impact mislabeled fish can have (especially to people with certain seafood allergies) and their impact on overfishing by obscuring its impact.

Various environmental news outlets have published op-eds criticizing Oceana's reports on seafood fraud, and similar criticism was included in a New York Times article. Criticism focuses on Oceana's assumption that all mislabeled seafood is intentionally fraudulent, even for species that are easily confused or have different names in different countries. The methodology of Oceana's studies has also been questioned, mainly due to its selection of historically mislabeled fish for testing instead of a more representative sample. Additionally, they criticized policy recommendations that Oceana recommended in their reports for being infeasible and bureaucratic.

=== Climate and energy ===
Oceana is dedicated to combating the numerous threats to the world's oceans that climate change imposes. Its main focus has been the acidification of the ocean, which threatens marine life, especially shellfish and coral that are necessary to many marine ecosystems, and, consequently, sources of seafood. They also focus on promoting offshore wind farms and combating the use of offshore drilling and seismic airgun blasting.

== Expeditions ==
Oceana launches expeditions to gather scientific data, which is used by Oceana, other nonprofit groups, local communities, and governmental agencies to create or influence policy.

Recent examples of these expeditions' success can be seen in Malta, where an expedition led to the Maltese government expanding marine protected areas, or in the Philippines, where an expedition led to the government creating a new marine protected area in the Benham Bank.

== Successful efforts ==
Oceana focuses on influencing specific legislation, lawsuits, or other policies, which fit under its broader goals. It calls these "victories" when successful. Recent successes have included protecting dusky sharks, banning industrial activity in Canada's marine protected areas, increasing transparency through digital tracking in Chile's fishing industry, and creating the second-largest marine national park in Spain's Mediterranean coast.

In 2017 Oceana denounced on the irregular disposal of tailings from Planta de Pellets into the sea near Huasco in northern Chile. This resulted in the Planta de Pellets committing in 2019 to cease using this disposal method by late 2023.

Over the course of its existence, Oceana has protected 4.5 million square miles of the ocean by influencing legislation and policy related to banning bottom trawling, restricting fishing, and establishing Marine Protected Areas. Oceana considers an area "protected" once it has achieved a policy victory related to protecting it.

== Books ==
=== The Perfect Protein ===
Andy Sharpless, the CEO of Oceana, and author Suzannah Evans wrote The Perfect Protein in 2013. While it mentions some of Oceana's achievements, it focuses on its main goal: to make fishing a sustainable and abundant food supply. The main recommendations and goals of the book are science based catch limits, eating fish lower on the food chain (like sardines), focusing less on more glamorous sea creatures (like whales and dolphins), protecting habitats, and reducing bycatch.

=== Oceana: Our Endangered Oceans and What We Can Do to Save Them ===
Actor and Oceana Vice Chair Ted Danson, along with Michael D'Orso, wrote the book Oceana: Our Endangered Oceans and What We Can Do to Save Them in 2011. It describes Danson's early involvement with the environmental movement while also explaining the problems that face our oceans today, such as offshore drilling, pollution, ocean acidification, and overfishing. The book is scientifically grounded and was called engaging by the Los Angeles Times because it is filled with asides, charts, and photographs.

== Criticism ==
=== Responsible fishing ===
The California Wetfish Producers Association (CWPA), a small nonprofit organization dedicated to preserving California's wetfish industry, has repeatedly criticized Oceana's attempts to temporarily halt the Pacific sardine fishery. CWPA criticized Oceana's citation of a National Oceanic and Atmospheric Administration (NOAA) study that reported 95% of the sardine stock had been depleted since 2006 (and the study itself). CWPA claims that these numbers are inflated and that the actual (smaller) decline in fish stock has not been caused by overfishing, but rather by environmental factors. The CWPA has specifically called Oceana's claims about overfishing "fake news." Although the NOAA has not fully responded to the CWPA's calls for a new study, it has not declared sardines overfished, but it has also banned commercial fishing of sardines.

In 2021, a Netflix documentary Seaspiracy criticized Oceana for appearing to be unable to provide a definition for "sustainable fishing". Oceana responded by saying it was misrepresented in the film, and argued that abstaining from eating fish as the film recommends is not a realistic choice for people who depend on coastal fisheries.

== See also ==
- Biodiversity
- Conservation movement
- Sustainability
