= Benham Bank =

Ocean bank in the Philippine Sea

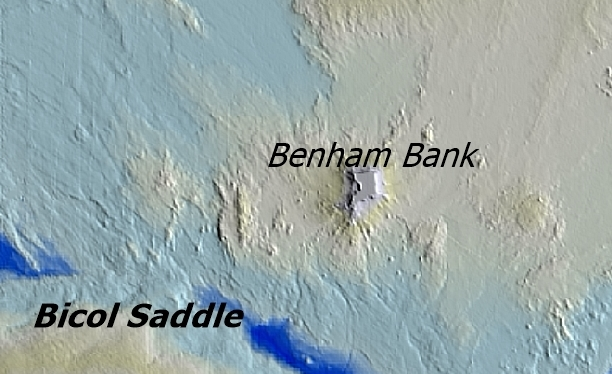
- Summit depth: 48 m (157 ft)
- Height: 2,847 meters (9,341 ft)
- Summit area: 52 km^{2} (20 sq mi)

Location
- Location: Philippine Sea
- Group: Benham Rise
- Coordinates: 15°48′26.8″N 124°16′58.2″E
- Country: Philippines

Geology
- Type: Ocean bank

Benham Bank is an ocean bank in the Philippine Sea. It is the shallowest point of Benham Rise, which is wholly part of the territory of the Philippines.

== Geology ==
With an area of around 170 square kilometers (66 sq mi), the Benham Bank only forms 1 percent of the Benham Rise. It is the shallowest point of the larger underwater plateau at 48 to 100 meters (157 to 328 ft) below sea level. It has a diameter of 30 kilometers (19 mi) from its base.

The summit area has a surface area of 52 square kilometers (20 sq mi) and has a general length and width of 8 and 6.5 kilometers (5.0 and 4.0 mi).

It has a basal elevation of −2,895 meters (−9,498 ft) while the height from its base to its summit is 2,847 meters (9,341 ft).

== Flora and fauna ==
Benham Bank hosts at least 200 species of fish, including commercially important fish such as the blue fin tuna. At the mesophotic zone or around 150 meters (490 ft) of the ocean bank, sponges and algae such as Halimeda green macroalgae have been observed. Expeditions in 2014 and 2016 revealed a mesophotic coral reef with 100% live coral cover.

== Research ==
Marine scientists from the Bureau of Fisheries and Aquatic Resources (BFAR) and the University of the Philippines (UP) conducted research in the Benham Bank in 2016. They boarded the government ship MV DA-BFAR for their research. Their remotely operated vehicle as well as technical diver-videographers were provided by Oceana Philippines. BFAR and UP also conducted research in 2014.

== Conservation ==
Local environmental groups have urged the Department of Environment and Natural Resources to declare the Benham Bank as a "no-take" zone to legally protect the feature's biodiversity by limiting "human activity".
