= Central Basin Spreading Center =

Seafloor spreading center of the West Philippine Sea Basin

Central Basin Spreading Center (CBSC), formerly Central Basin Fault, is a seafloor spreading center of the West Philippine Basin. It is a long, NW-SE-trending structure that is considered to have been the spreading center of the West Philippine Basin (WPB) from the Eocene to the middle Oligocene. It is a remnant spreading center, meaning that it is no longer active. However, it still displays many of the features that are characteristic of spreading centers, such as a rift valley, axial ridges, and abyssal hills. The CBSC is divided into two segments: the eastern segment and the western segment. The eastern segment is characterized by slow-spreading features, such as a deep rift valley and nodal basins. The western segment is characterized by fast-spreading features, such as overlapping spreading centers and volcanic axial ridges.

The CBSC is also associated with a number of other features, including oceanic plateaus and seamount chains. These features suggest that the CBSC formed in a complex tectonic environment, possibly involving a mantle plume. The study of the CBSC provides important insights into the formation and evolution of marginal basins. Marginal basins are small ocean basins that are formed on the margins of continents or island arcs. The CBSC is a good example of a marginal basin that formed through seafloor spreading.
