= Applied Food Technologies =

Seafood company

Applied Food Technologies, Inc. (AFT) is a privately held corporation in Alachua, Florida that develops diagnostics needed in the seafood industry and runs fee-for-service species identification and verification programs.

== Overview ==
Applied Food Technologies is primarily a research and development company focusing on fish species identification using DNA and environmental contaminant detection using gene expression in sentinel organisms. AFT also offers a fee-for-service business for seafood species identification.

== Technology ==
The DNA-based species identification diagnostics developed by AFT are used in-house and are also packaged in a kit format and sold to federal, state and private laboratories in the US, Europe and Asia. AFT has established an extensive library of taxonomically verified fish species and has developed DNA standards for these fish.

== Criticism ==
AFT has been criticized as being "in industry's pocket" because AFT has been a loud voice in support of industry against media reports of mislabeling. AFT claims their internal testing has shown a much lower mislabeling rate than media reports. Although Applied Food Technologies has been included in numerous media reports concerning seafood species mislabeling and has been contacted to conduct testing for the media many times, AFT does not perform species identification testing for the media, which may be the cause of some criticism. AFT's mission statement includes offering a testing service to the seafood industry utilizing the "best available science" for the purpose of improving the industry to better serve the consumer. Typically the media outlets are unable to meet the chain of custody requirements within the "best available science" component, which is one of the principal reasons AFT does not offer testing to the media.

Applied Food Technologies offers fee-for-service business in several areas including fish species identification (also known as Fish ID), seafood net weight, and antibiotic residue testing, which are described in detail below.

== Purpose ==
Even with the plethora of laws and regulations protecting consumers from mislabeling of seafood, enforcing compliance has been challenging because of the unique nature of seafood itself. Unlike cattle, poultry, pork, crops, or other land-based food sources, the "farms" on which wild seafood is grown cannot easily be inspected. LeeAnn Applewhite realized in 2000 that modern technology could be used to solve this problem, was awarded several USDA SBIR research awards to develop the tools, and founded AFT to create a solution.

Applied Food Technologies maintains an internal DNA database generated from a collection of economically important seafood specimens, which were taxonomically identified by third-party institutions, such as the Smithsonian and the Florida Museum. These taxonomically validated specimens were sequenced in multiple regions to create a database of unique sequences capable of correctly identifying and distinguishing different seafood species." Because only species identification testing that compares the sequence to a validated reference meets the current FDA guidelines for species identification, any lab not using a validated reference does not meet the FDA requirement. AFT's Applewhite says, "Using a public database to determine a fish species is not very useful because the data is only as accurate as the least careful person submitting sequences, thus, the DNA sequences for common substitutes can also appear in the database under the wrong name." FDA’s Stephanie Yao agrees, "Most other labs are pulling publicly available sequences off of the Internet to make their identifications, a practice FDA does not recommend for regulatory decisions." FDA's Yao continued, AFT "often runs samples for importers whose shipments are being held by the FDA and the FDA has released some of those shipments based on AFT’s results."

== History ==
Applied Food Technologies CEO, LeeAnn Applewhite, incorporated APL Sciences in 1997 after inventing a seafood test kit and licensing the technology to Neogen Corporation. APL Sciences received five USDA Small Business Innovation Research (SBIR) Awards totaling approximately $1,000,000.00. AFT was formed in 2003 in Blacksburg, Virginia, by LeeAnn Applewhite and Maureen Dolan to be the fee-for-service testing laboratory and manufacturing and marketing arms for APL Science, Inc. Robert Mino later joined as a co-owner until the company’s sale in 2015. AFT has also been awarded several SBIR grants and industry research contracts including most recently a grant to develop a method for species identification for the U.S. shrimp industry.

Applied Food Technologies was showcased on a national broadcast of The Early Show on CBS on June 8, 2011 to discuss seafood mislabeling after release of a national publication on the issue by consumer advocate group Oceana and a subsequent New York Times publication on the subject. Although in business for several years, Applied Food Technologies came to the national attention after becoming the first company with DNA-based fish species identification methods recognized by the FDA to test all catfish imported from China in the late 2000s. Applied Food Technologies was subsequently interviewed in May, 2010, by ABC affiliate WCJB-TV. Applied Food Technologies was showcased in University of Florida’s Explore magazine Fall 2011, issue.

=== Milestones ===
- 2000 – Started development of DNA-based diagnostics for seafood species identification through USDA SBIR research grant targeted toward the growing national issue of seafood mislabeling.

Collaborated with the Seafood Industry to collect fish and shellfish species for taxonomical verification at museums across the country to establish a validated database of reference specimens.

- 2002 – Developed and launched the PCR multiplex Authenti-kit(SM) for Crab diagnostic kit for crab species identification.
- 2004 – Developed and launched the PCR multiplex Authenti-kit(SM) for Catfish diagnostic kit for catfish species identification.
- 2005 – Began partnering with US Foods after US Foods approached AFT to start a grouper authentication program, following recommendation by NOAA NMFS.

– Worked with US Foods, FDA, and other Seafood Industry stakeholders to develop an acceptable sampling plan for species identification testing.
- AFT began using protein fingerprinting techniques to perform species identification on a larger number of species.

- 2006 – Collaborated extensively with FDA to create regulatory standards and protocols currently recommended for molecular regulatory compliance testing for species identification.

– Authenti-kit(SM) for Catfish becomes the first DNA method accepted for regulatory compliance testing by FDA after FDA approves Authenti-kit(SM) for Catfish for use in regulatory compliance testing under Import Alert 16-128.

- 2007 – AFT’s regulatory testing program expanded to collaborations with multiple state agencies to create state standards and testing programs for species identification testing using Authenti-kit(SM) for Catfish.

– Collaborated with FDA to develop the extraction protocol for DNA-barcoding for fish species identification which later became FDA LIB-4420.
– Greatly expanded industry and regulatory testing programs using DNA-barcoding for most fish species outside the Authenti-kit(SM) product line.
- AFT began to use DNA techniques exclusively to identify seafood species.

- 2008 – Teamed with FDA to develop the requirements for private laboratory data reports (ORA Laboratory Manual, Section 7) for DNA-barcoding for Import Alert 16-128.

– Began analyzing DNA sequence discrepancies in commonly used databases, such as Genbank and Fish Barcode of Life, to develop definitive secondary tests to differentiate between
closely related species of commercially important seafood that cannot be distinguished using data from the public databases alone.

- 2009 – Initiated substantial research and development program to create DNA mini-barcoding and real-time PCR methods to discriminate closely related species, allowing AFT to distinguish between

closely related species that are indistinguishable using current DNA-barcoding or public database-related protocols.

- 2010 - AFT moved operations from Virginia to Alachua, Florida and reincorporated in Florida.
- 2011 - AFT purchased the assets of EcoArray, Inc., bringing AFT into the environmental arena. AFT currently resides in the Sid Martin Biotechnology Incubator. After the acquisition of EcoArray assets, AFT entered into the environmental water testing market. Information gathered from Applied Food Technologies website. (Last visited October 1, 2011).
- 2012 - AFT becomes first testing laboratory to develop a validated test for identifying species of canned tuna.
- 2014 - AFT becomes an ISO Accredited laboratory.
- 2015 - AFT acquired, becoming the largest seafood identity testing lab in the United States.
