= Lubang-Verde Passage fault system =

Geological structure between Luzon and Mindoro Island in the Philippines

The Lubang-Verde Passage fault system is a major strike-slip fault system located offshore between the Batangas and Mindoro Island in the Philippines.

== Background ==
The fault follows the northwest-southeast alignment of Verde and Lubang islands and is primarily considered a left-lateral fault, meaning the two sides of the fault move horizontally past each other in opposite directions. This geological feature is associated with seismic activity, giving rise to earthquakes of varying magnitudes. Notably, on July 24, 2021, the fault was responsible for the Calatagan earthquake, which registered a magnitude of 6.6. The region's tectonic dynamics, marked by the lateral motion along this fault, contributes to the occurrence of significant seismic events such as the mentioned earthquake.
